= List of endemic birds of Australia =

This article is one of a series providing information about endemism among birds in the world's various zoogeographic zones. For an overview of this subject see Endemism in birds.

== Patterns of endemism ==
Family-level endemism is prominent in Australia. The Australasian biogeographic region has the highest number of endemic families of any zoogeographic region except the Neotropics, and many of these families are endemic to Australia itself — the country therefore stakes a strong claim to be the world's greatest hotspot of bird endemism.

=== Australian endemic and near-endemic families ===
The Australian endemic families are:

- Emu (Dromaiidae), a well-known monotypic family; the emu is found in rural areas throughout the continent
- Plains-wanderer (Pedionomidae), a monotypic family; plains-wanderer is restricted to arid inland areas in the southeast of Australia
- Lyrebirds (Menuridae), two forest-dwelling species of southeast Australia
- Scrub-birds (Atrichornithidae), two forest-dwelling species, one found in southeastern Australia, the other in southwest Australia
- Australian mudnesters (Struthideidae), two species found in open forest and woodland environments in eastern Australia
- Bristlebirds (Dasyornithidae), three species: eastern, western and rufous bristlebirds.
- Pardalotes (Pardalotidae), four species: spotted, forty-spotted, red-browed and striated pardalote

In addition to the families listed above, the following families are endemic to the Australasian region, with some of their species also found in New Guinea:

- Magpie goose (Anseranatidae), a monotypic family with a portion of the population living on New Guinea
- Australian treecreepers (Climacteridae), seven species, six endemic to Australia and one, the Papuan treecreeper, endemic to New Guinea.
- Bowerbirds (Ptilonorhynchidae), twenty species, ten found in Australia, eight in New Guinea, and two in both.
- Fairy-wrens, emu-wrens, and grasswrens (Maluridae), twenty-nine species, twenty-three endemic to Australia and six to New Guinea
- Australasian babblers (Pomatostomidae), four of the five species are endemic to Australia
- Logrunners (Orthonychidae), three species, two endemic to Australia and one to New Guinea
- Jewel-babblers and quail-thrushes (Cinclosomatidae), nine species, five Australian, four from New Guinea, sometimes broadened to Phosphodidae to include whipbirds and wedgebills (six species, five from Australia and one from New Guinea).
- Sittellas (Neosittidae), two species, the varied sittella of Australia and the black sittella of New Guinea
- Boatbills (Machaerirhynchidae), two species, Australia's yellow-breasted boatbill and New Guinea's black-breasted boatbill.

A further group of families endemic to the Australasian region, but where the species are predominantly New Guinea endemics are listed in the article on endemic birds of New Guinea.

== Endemic Bird Areas ==
BirdLife International has defined the following Endemic Bird Areas (EBAs) in Australia:

181	Cape York
182	Queensland wet tropics
183	Eastern Australia
184	South-east Australia
185	Tasmania
186	Southwest Australia
187	North West Australia

Christmas Island, an Australian territory, is also an EBA.

In addition the following are classified as secondary areas (areas with at least one restricted-range bird species, but not meeting the criteria to qualify as EBAs):

s115	Clarke Range
s116	East Australian mangroves
s117	Bulloo and Diamantina rivers
s118	Simpson and Strzelecki deserts
s119	South Australian desert
s120	West Australian mangroves
s121	Gulf of Carpentaria

== List of species ==
The following is a list of bird species endemic to Australia:

=== Species endemic to coastal eastern Australia ===
==== Species endemic to the Cape York peninsula ====
- Buff-breasted buttonquail
- Golden-shouldered parrot
- White-streaked honeyeater

==== Species endemic to the Queensland wet tropics ====
- Chowchilla
- Fernwren
- Atherton scrubwren
- Mountain thornbill
- Grey-headed robin
- Pied monarch
- Bower's shrike-thrush
- Bridled honeyeater
- Macleay's honeyeater
- Tooth-billed catbird
- Golden bowerbird
- Victoria's riflebird

==== Species endemic to eastern Australia ====
- Black-breasted buttonquail
- Albert's lyrebird
- Rufous scrub-bird
- Eastern bristlebird
- Pilotbird
- Rockwarbler
- Green catbird
- Regent bowerbird
- Paradise riflebird

==== Species found in more than one of the above areas, but not elsewhere ====
- Australian brushturkey
- Lovely fairywren (Cape York, Queensland wet tropics)
- Yellow-spotted honeyeater (Cape York, Queensland wet tropics)
- Pale-yellow robin (Queensland wet tropics, eastern Australia)

=== Species endemic to south-eastern Australia ===
Many, but some include;

- Kangaroo Island emu (extinct)
- Powerful owl
- Gang-gang cockatoo
- Long-billed corella
- Turquoise parrot
- Superb lyrebird
- Pilotbird
- Musk lorikeet
- Rose robin

=== Species endemic to Tasmania ===
- King Island emu (extinct)
- Tasmanian nativehen
- Green rosella
- Orange-bellied parrot (endemic as a breeding species, winters in south-east mainland Australia)
- Swift parrot (endemic as a breeding species, winters in eastern and south-east mainland Australia)
- Brown scrubwren
- Scrubtit
- Tasmanian thornbill
- Dusky robin
- Forty-spotted pardalote
- Yellow-throated honeyeater
- Black-headed honeyeater
- Strong-billed honeyeater
- Yellow wattlebird
- Black currawong

=== Species endemic to south-west Australia ===
- Baudin's cockatoo
- Noisy scrub-bird
- Red-capped parrot
- Red-eared firetail
- Red-winged fairywren
- Carnaby's cockatoo
- Western bristlebird
- Western corella
- Western ground parrot
- Western rosella
- Western shrike-tit (often regarded as a subspecies of the crested shrike-tit)
- Western spinebill
- Western thornbill
- Western wattlebird
- White-breasted robin

=== Species endemic to north-west Australia ===
- Black-banded fruit dove
- Black grasswren
- Red-lored whistler
- Hooded parrot
- Chestnut-backed buttonquail
- Chestnut-quilled rock pigeon
- Partridge pigeon
- Rainbow pitta
- Kimberley honeyeater
- White-lined honeyeater
- White-quilled rock pigeon
- White-throated grasswren
- Yellow-rumped munia

The chestnut rail is near-endemic to this region of Australia, elsewhere only being found on the Aru Islands.

=== Other endemics ===
- Emu
- Malleefowl
- Stubble quail
- Chestnut teal
- Musk duck
- Cape Barren goose
- Maned duck
- Black swan
- Plumed whistling duck
- Pink-eared duck
- Blue-billed duck
- Australian shelduck
- Freckled duck
- Royal penguin (Macquarie Island endemic)
- Christmas Island frigatebird (Christmas Island endemic)
- Abbott's booby (Christmas Island endemic)
- Short-tailed shearwater (breeding endemic)
- Hoary-headed grebe (vagrant to New Zealand, has bred there)
- Yellow-billed spoonbill
- Black-faced cormorant
- Macquarie shag (Macquarie Island endemic)
- Heard Island shag (Heard Island endemic; sometimes considered a subspecies of the imperial shag)
- Nankeen kestrel (breeding endemic)
- Grey falcon
- Black falcon
- Black-shouldered kite
- Little eagle
- Red goshawk
- Black-breasted buzzard
- Square-tailed kite
- Black-tailed nativehen
- Lord Howe woodhen (Lord Howe Island endemic)
- Lord Howe swamphen (extinct—formerly endemic to Lord Howe Island)
- Australian crake
- Red-chested buttonquail
- Little buttonquail
- Red-necked avocet
- Banded stilt
- Sooty oystercatcher
- Banded lapwing
- Red-capped plover (formerly bred in New Zealand)
- Red-kneed dotterel
- Inland dotterel
- Hooded dotterel
- Plains wanderer
- Australian painted snipe
- Australian pratincole (breeding endemic)
- Pacific gull
- White-headed pigeon
- Brown cuckoo-dove (sometimes lumped with slender-billed cuckoo-dove)
- Common bronzewing
- Flock bronzewing
- Brush bronzewing
- Crested pigeon
- Spinifex pigeon
- Squatter pigeon
- Wonga pigeon
- Diamond dove
- Black-banded fruit-dove (until recently considered a subspecies of banded fruit-dove)
- Christmas imperial pigeon (Christmas Island endemic)
- Topknot pigeon
- Norfolk pigeon (extinct, formerly endemic to Norfolk Island)
- Horsfield's bronze cuckoo (breeding endemic)
- Black-eared cuckoo (breeding endemic)
- Pallid cuckoo (breeding endemic)
- Christmas boobook (Christmas Island endemic)
- Tawny frogmouth
- Spotted nightjar (breeding endemic)
- Australian swiftlet
- Laughing kookaburra
- Red-backed kingfisher
- Norfolk kaka (extinct, formerly endemic to Norfolk Island)
- Yellow-tailed black cockatoo
- Glossy black cockatoo
- Red-tailed black cockatoo
- Galah
- Major Mitchell's cockatoo
- Cockatiel
- Superb parrot
- Regent parrot
- Princess parrot
- Australian king parrot
- Eastern ground parrot
- Night parrot
- Bourke's parrot
- Blue-winged parrot
- Elegant parrot
- Rock parrot
- Scarlet-chested parrot
- Norfolk parakeet (Norfolk Island endemic)
- Macquarie parakeet (Extinct; formerly endemic to Macquarie Island)
- Lord Howe parakeet (Extinct; formerly endemic to Lord Howe Island)
- Australian ringneck (formerly split into mallee ringneck and Port Lincoln parrot; both subspecies are endemic)
- Crimson rosella
- Eastern rosella
- Northern rosella
- Pale-headed rosella
- Naretha bluebonnet (previously considered a subspecies of eastern bluebonnet)
- Red-rumped parrot
- Mulga parrot
- Paradise parrot (extinct)
- Musk lorikeet
- Little lorikeet
- Purple-crowned lorikeet
- Varied lorikeet
- Scaly-breasted lorikeet
- Budgerigar
- Spotted catbird
- Satin bowerbird
- Western bowerbird
- Spotted bowerbird
- Great bowerbird
- White-throated treecreeper
- White-browed treecreeper
- Red-browed treecreeper
- Brown treecreeper
- Rufous treecreeper
- Black-tailed treecreeper
- Grey grasswren
- Carpentarian grasswren
- Striated grasswren
- Short-tailed grasswren
- Eyrean grasswren
- Kalkadoon grasswren
- Dusky grasswren
- Thick-billed grasswren
- Western grasswren
- Southern emu-wren
- Mallee emu-wren
- Rufous-crowned emu-wren
- Splendid fairywren
- White-winged fairywren
- Red-backed fairywren
- Purple-crowned fairywren
- Superb fairywren
- Variegated fairywren
- Blue-breasted fairywren
- Eastern spinebill
- Pied honeyeater
- Lewin's honeyeater
- Graceful honeyeater
- Yellow honeyeater
- White-gaped honeyeater
- White-fronted honeyeater
- Yellow-faced honeyeater
- Yellow-tufted honeyeater
- Purple-gaped honeyeater
- Yellow-throated miner
- Black-eared miner
- Noisy miner
- Bell miner
- Eungella honeyeater
- Spiny-cheeked honeyeater
- Regent honeyeater
- Little wattlebird
- Red wattlebird
- Singing honeyeater
- Mangrove honeyeater
- Yellow-plumed honeyeater
- White-plumed honeyeater
- Fuscous honeyeater
- Grey-headed honeyeater
- Grey-fronted honeyeater
- Bar-breasted honeyeater
- Rufous-throated honeyeater
- Grey honeyeater
- Gibberbird
- Yellow chat
- Crimson chat
- Orange chat
- White-fronted chat
- Black honeyeater
- Scarlet myzomela
- Tawny-crowned honeyeater
- Banded honeyeater
- Crescent honeyeater
- New Holland honeyeater
- White-cheeked honeyeater
- White-eared honeyeater
- Gilbert's honeyeater
- White-naped honeyeater
- Brown-headed honeyeater
- Black-chinned honeyeater
- Macleay's honeyeater
- Striped honeyeater
- Painted honeyeater
- Silver-crowned friarbird
- Rufous bristlebird
- Spotted pardalote
- Striated pardalote
- Red-browed pardalote
- Rockwarbler
- Yellow-throated scrubwren
- White-browed scrubwren
- Large-billed scrubwren
- Redthroat
- Speckled warbler
- Rufous fieldwren
- Striated fieldwren
- Chestnut-rumped heathwren
- Shy heathwren
- Buff-rumped thornbill
- Slender-billed thornbill
- Brown thornbill
- Inland thornbill
- Yellow-rumped thornbill
- Chestnut-rumped thornbill
- Slaty-backed thornbill
- Yellow thornbill
- Striated thornbill
- Weebill
- Dusky gerygone
- Brown gerygone
- Western gerygone
- Norfolk gerygone (Norfolk Island endemic)
- Lord Howe gerygone (extinct; formerly endemic to Lord Howe Island)
- Southern whiteface
- Chestnut-breasted whiteface
- Banded whiteface
- White-browed babbler
- Hall's babbler
- Chestnut-crowned babbler
- Australian logrunner
- Eastern whipbird
- Western whipbird
- Chiming wedgebill
- Chirruping wedgebill
- Copperback quail-thrush
- Chestnut-breasted quail-thrush
- Western quail-thrush
- Cinnamon quail-thrush
- Nullarbor quail-thrush
- Yellow-breasted boatbill
- Masked woodswallow
- White-browed woodswallow
- Dusky woodswallow
- Little woodswallow
- Grey butcherbird
- Silver-backed butcherbird
- Pied butcherbird
- Pied currawong
- Grey currawong
- Ground cuckooshrike
- Crested shriketit (often split into northern shriketit, eastern shriketit, and western shriketit—all are endemic)
- Sandstone shrikethrush
- Bower's shrikethrush
- Olive whistler
- Gilbert's whistler
- White-breasted whistler
- Crested bellbird
- White-eared monarch
- Frill-necked monarch
- Restless flycatcher
- Little crow
- Australian raven
- Little raven
- Forest raven
- White-winged chough
- Apostlebird
- Scarlet robin
- Red-capped robin
- Flame robin
- Pink robin
- Hooded robin
- Eastern yellow robin
- Western yellow robin
- White-browed robin
- Buff-sided robin
- Northern scrub robin
- Southern scrub robin
- Fairy martin (breeding endemic)
- White-backed swallow
- Spinifexbird
- Brown songlark
- Rufous songlark
- Christmas white-eye (Christmas Island endemic)
- Canary white-eye
- Lord Howe silvereye (sometimes considered a subspecies of silvereye)
- Robust white-eye (extinct; formerly endemic to Lord Howe Island)
- Slender-billed white-eye (Norfolk Island endemic)
- White-chested white-eye (Norfolk Island endemic; likely extinct)
- Bassian thrush
- Tasman starling (extinct; formerly endemic to Norfolk Island and Lord Howe Island. Some consider the Lord Howe starling and Norfolk starling separate species.)
- Painted firetail
- Beautiful firetail
- Diamond firetail
- Red-browed firetail
- Star finch
- Plum-headed finch
- Double-barred finch
- Masked finch
- Long-tailed finch
- Black-throated finch
- Gouldian finch
- Yellow-rumped mannikin
- Pictorella mannikin
