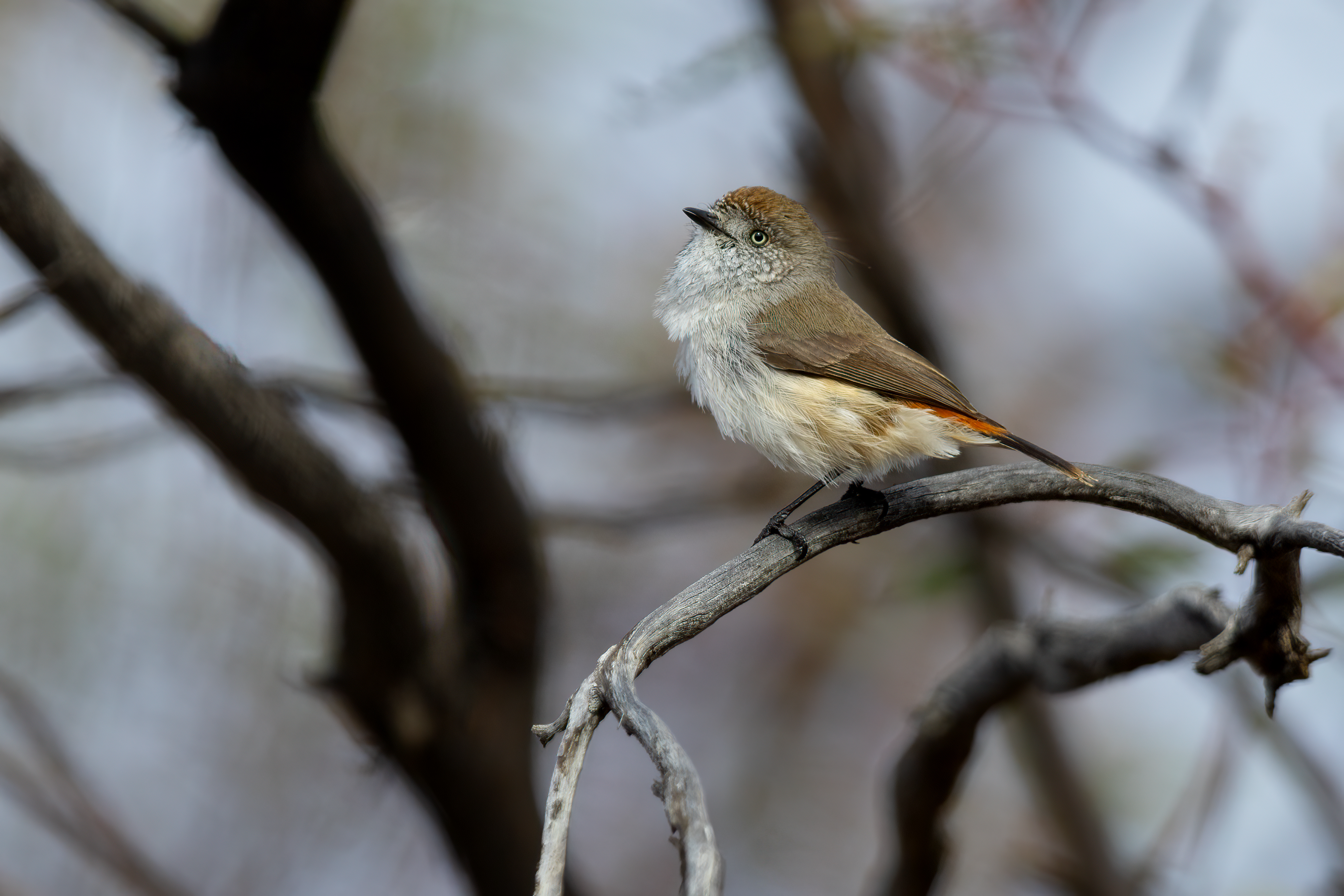
- At Gluepot Reserve, SA

Conservation status
- Least Concern (IUCN 3.1)

Scientific classification
- Kingdom: Animalia
- Phylum: Chordata
- Class: Aves
- Order: Passeriformes
- Family: Acanthizidae
- Genus: Acanthiza
- Species: A. uropygialis

Binomial name
- Acanthiza uropygialis Gould, 1838
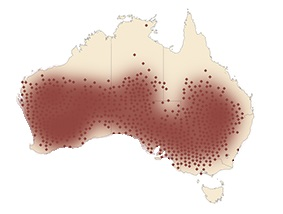
- Distribution of chestnut-rumped thornbill

= Chestnut-rumped thornbill =

Species of bird

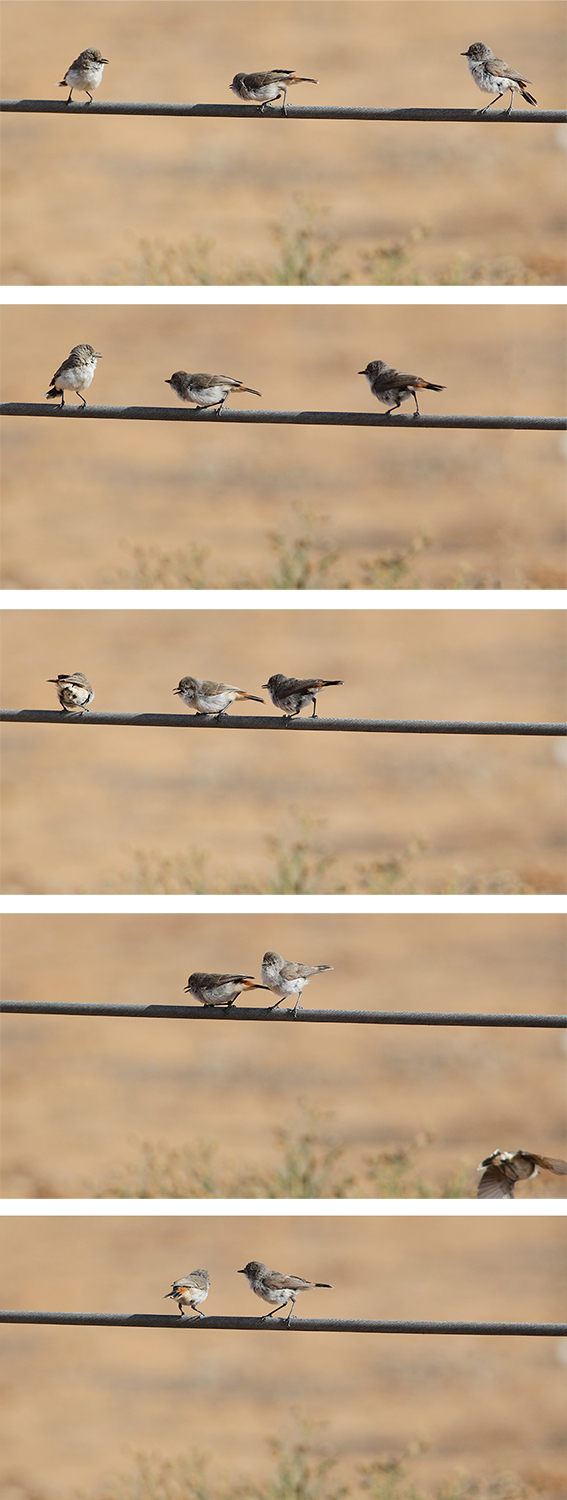
Chestnut-rumped thornbills posturing, (sequence of 5 photos in less than 2 seconds, Sturt Desert, NSW).

The chestnut-rumped thornbill (Acanthiza uropygialis) is a small passerine bird in the family Acanthizidae, endemic to Australia.

Specially named for its pale-chestnut rump from mediaeval Latin uropygium, the rump. Its other names include chestnut-tailed or chestnut-backed thornbill, tit or tit-warbler, chestnut-rumped tit or tit-warbler. A plain, pale thornbill, with pale eyes, it is widespread throughout inland Australia, west of the Great Dividing Range to the West Australian coast but is absent in the far north and humid southwest Western Australia. It is a cooperative breeder like some of the other thornbills

== Taxonomy and naming ==
Described and classified by John Gould in 1838 in Synopsis of Birds of Australia, from a specimen collected in Liverpool Plains NSW.

Type, male, No17602 (525) is in the Academy of Natural Sciences, Philadelphia, United States. A specimen from the Gould collection is in the British Museum.

Mathews (1912) recognised a number of different subspecies of Acanthiza Uropygialis: A.u.ruthergleni, mellori, augusta, nea, murchisoni and condora, with A.u.kycheringi added in 1922. Campbell (1925) added subspecies Geobasilus uropygialis moora and G.u. erema. Where the genus Geobasileus, referred to ground feeding thornbills.

However, Mack (1936) and Mayr & Serventy (1938) reorganised the species into two subspecies, A.u. uropygialis and A.u. augusta. Recent studies do not recognise subspecies but indicate that variations in plumage colouration are clinal.

Acanthiza had been previously placed in the family Pardalotidae, but are now part of the Acanthizidae.

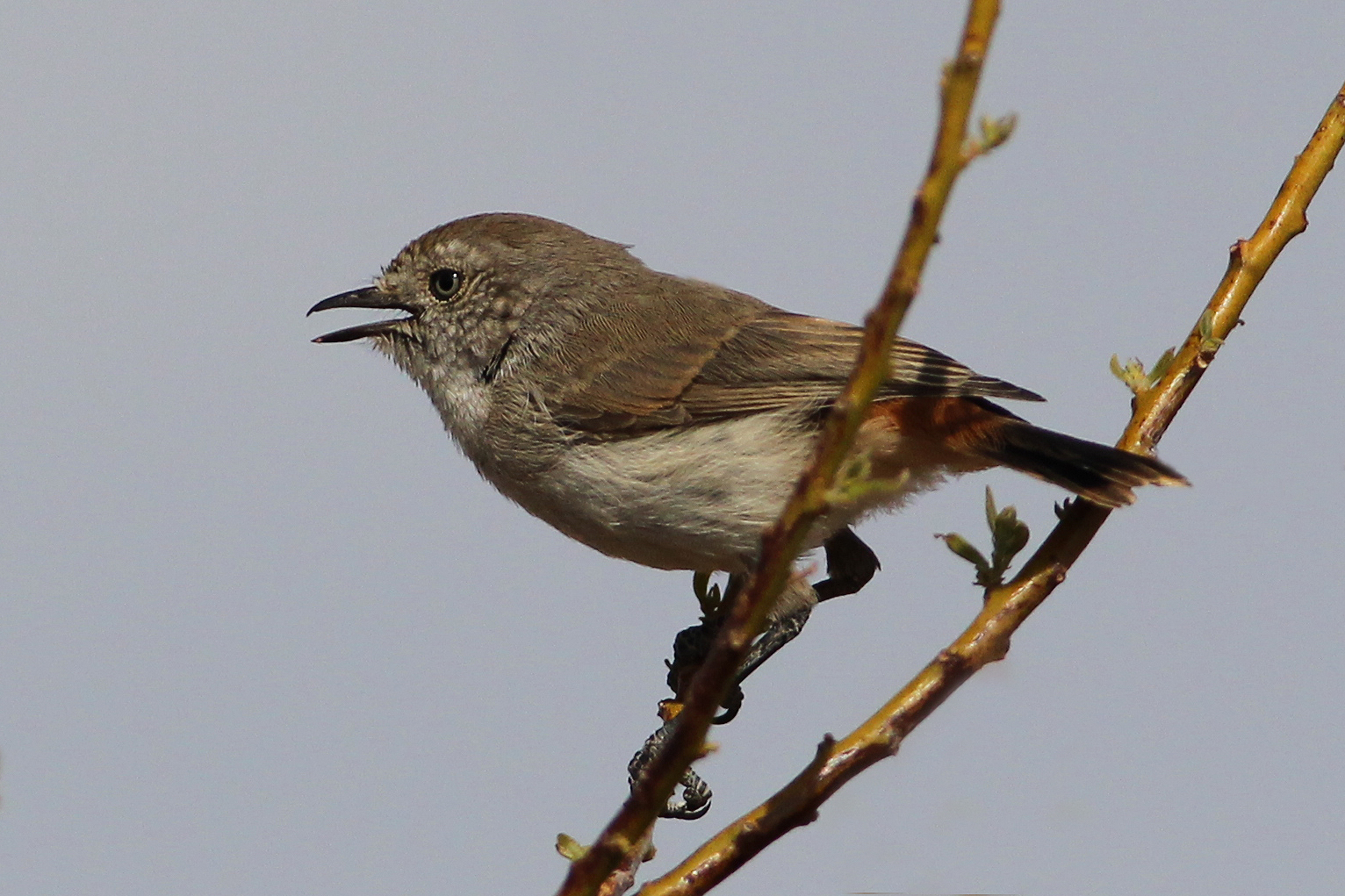
Chestnut-rumped thornbill (Sturt Desert, NSW).

== Description ==
Length: 9.8 cm (9-11); wing span 15.5 cm (14-16.5); weight: 6 g.

Mid-sized thornbill similar in size and shape to inland thornbill (A. apicalis) and slaty-backed thornbill (A. robustirostris). Pale and plain with pale iris similar to buff-rumped (Acanthiza reguloides), western (A.inornata), slender-billed (A. iredalei) and yellow-rumped thornbills (A. chrysorrhoa).

Pale grey-brown upper, rich chestnut rump and mostly black tail with pale tips, pale mottled ear-coverts and rufous suffusion on forehead and crown. Plain whitish underbody. The sexes are alike, with no seasonal variation.

Slight geographic variations, birds of the more arid inland are paler and greyer above, with a slightly paler rump patch and cleaner white below than those in coastal and subcoastal regions. May be confused with other thornbills having a rufous-brown rump patch such as brown thornbill (A. pusilla), inland thornbill (A. apicalis) and slaty-backed thornbills (A. robustirostris).

The chestnut-rumped thornbill is gregarious, usually in small flocks, twos or threes and sometimes with other thornbills and small passerines. Active and restless, the chestnut-rumped thornbill forages in shrubs and trees, searching briskly, flitting and hopping in foliage and low branches, probing into crevices and bark. It also hops on the ground searching among fallen debris.

Flight similar to other thornbills, cover to cover in low undulating dashes.

Voice is penetrating, with a far-carrying song of similar phrases. It also mimics other birds.

Juveniles are similar to adults, but plainer with duller head pattern, and pale buff tail tips, not white. Iris is slightly duller, cream or greyish white. Nearly fledged juveniles have pale yellow gape.

== Distribution and population ==
Endemic to mainland Australia.

Qld: Widespread in S, to W of Great Divide, in South Western, South Central and W. South-Eastern Regions. Generally S of 23° S.

NSW & ACT: Widespread W of Great Divide, including w. slopes of Northern Tablelands and southern Tablelands, Canberra.

Vic: Widespread in Mallee, Wimmera and North Districts N of 37°S.

SA: Widespread in many regions, but generally absent from SE (though a few records exist).

WA: Generally absent from Nullarbor Plain. Farther west largely absent from south coast, widespread in areas W of 123°E from 32°S North to 22°S in Pilbara region. Widespread in Gibson Desert, and scattered sites in Great Victoria Desert.

=== Movements ===
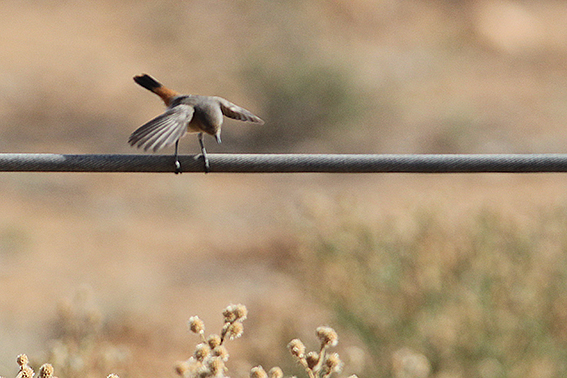
Chestnut-rumped thornbill, about to fly off (Sturt Desert, NSW).

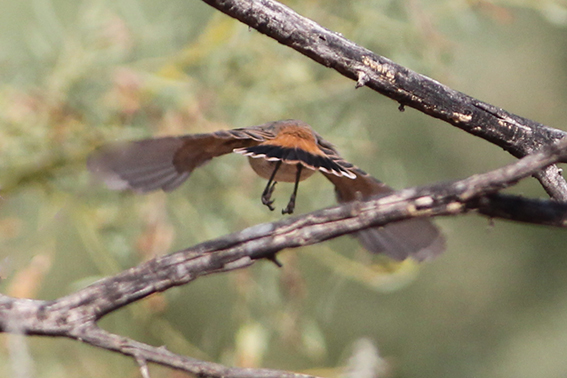
Chestnut-rumped thornbill, rear flight view (Sturt Desert, NSW).

Chestnut-rumped thornbills are resident or sedentary, but some movement occurs. No large-scale movements are known, though some individuals occasionally move long distances. Non-breeding flocks disperse before breeding.

=== Habitat ===
They are found in dry woodlands and shrublands, mainly of mulga and malleeeucalypts. Also in thickets, saltbush, bluebush, lignum, open pastoral country, among dead trees and stumps. They occur in arid and semi-arid zones extending to temperate and subtropical zones, in a wide variety of land forms including sand dunes, flood plains, rocky hillsides, plateaux and gorges.

== Behaviour ==
=== Feeding ===
Chestnut-rumped thornbills are mainly insectivores but occasionally eat seeds. Studies on stomach contents show spiders, insects, plants, seeds and buds.

They mostly forage in foliage and from branches of shrubs and low trees but also regularly on the ground, by gleaning 81.8% (leaves, twigs, branches, ground), sallying 4.4% and 13.9% by probing into bark. The young are fed tiny insects and small white grubs.

They are gregarious and rarely seen singly. Feeding flocks are usually small parties of up to ten, and less often up to 20 birds, associating with brown thornbill (A. pusilla), yellow-rumped thornbill (A. chrysorrhoa), southern whiteface (Aphelocephala leucopsis), white-browed scrubwrens (Sericornis frontalis) or redthroats (Pyrrholaemus brunneus), and occasionally joined by silvereyes (Zosterops lateralis).

In South Australia during winter, they may congregate in mixed feeding groups with yellow (A. nana), yellow-rumped (A. chrysorrhoa) and buff-rumped thornbills (A. reguloides), with up to 100 or more birds in groups.

=== Breeding ===
Most records of chestnut-rumped thornbills breeding involve pairs; however, they appear occasionally to breed co-operatively. Both adults are involved with building nests, which are small, neat and domed usually ovoid, with a rounded entrance at the side or near the top. If inside a hollow, the entrance is often flush with the opening of the hollow. Materials used are dried grass, bark strips, plant stems, moss, lichen and spider web, with a lining of feathers, wool or fur.

Nest sites are usually in hollows, often vertical, in live and dead trees, with the entrance at the end of a spout, crevice or knothole, in the side of a branch or trunk. They also nest in stumps, logs or branches lying on the ground and in fence-posts.

The breeding season is June to December, and two broods, possibly three can be raised per season. The ovoid eggs are laid at two-day intervals. They are very fine, slightly glossy, flesh-white and minutely freckled all over with reddish brown and purplish brown, particularly at the large-end.

The chicks are altricial and nidicolous, with both adults feeding the nestlings and fledglings. The fledging period is around 18–20 days.

Chestnut-rumped thornbills are known to be parasitised by Horsfield's bronze cuckoos (Chalcites basalis).

== Conservation ==
Range: The chestnut-rumped thornbill has an extremely large range, and therefore does not approach the thresholds for Vulnerable under the range size criterion (Extent of Occurrence <20,000 km2 combined with a declining or fluctuating range size, habitat extent/quality, or population size and a small number of locations or severe fragmentation).

Population trend: Though the population trend appears to be decreasing, the decline is not believed to be sufficiently rapid to approach the thresholds for Vulnerable under the population trend criterion (>30% decline over ten years or three generations).

Population size: This has not been quantified, but it is not believed to approach the thresholds for Vulnerable under the population size criterion (<10,000 mature individuals with a continuing decline estimated to be >10% in ten years or three generations, or with a specified population structure).

For these reasons the species is evaluated as least concern.

However, the chestnut-rumped thornbill is on a list of declining woodland birds, characterized mostly by being ground or low-shrub feeders and dwellers as well as being predominantly insectivores. The clearing of woodlands on fertile soils and overgrazing of remaining native vegetation, has resulted in fewer ground-dwelling invertebrate prey, causing chestnut-rumped thornbill's range to be possibly contracting towards the inland.

== Gallery ==
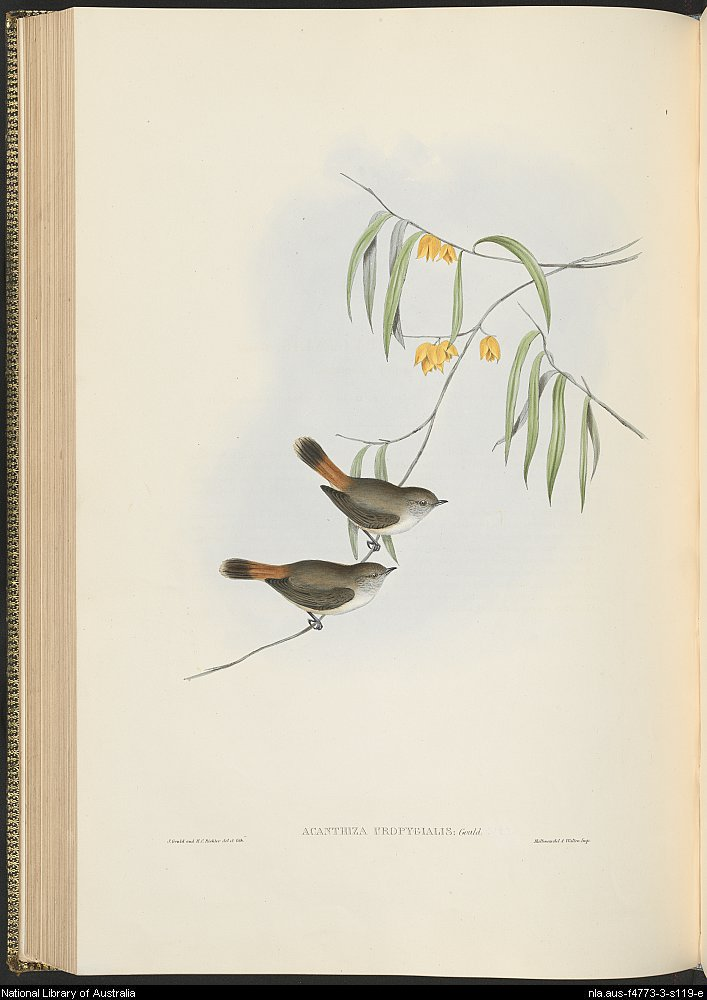
Acanthiza uropygialis, Gould (1848), Birds of Australia.

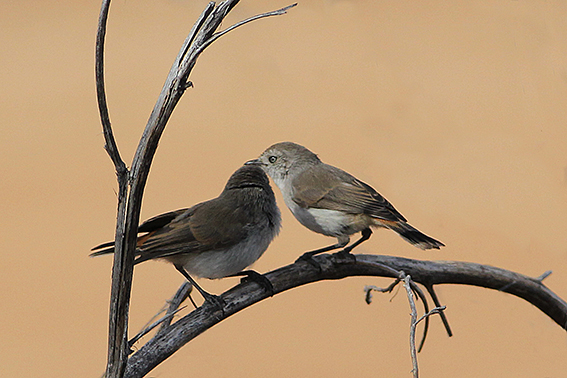
Pair of chestnut-rumped thornbills (Sturt Desert, NSW).

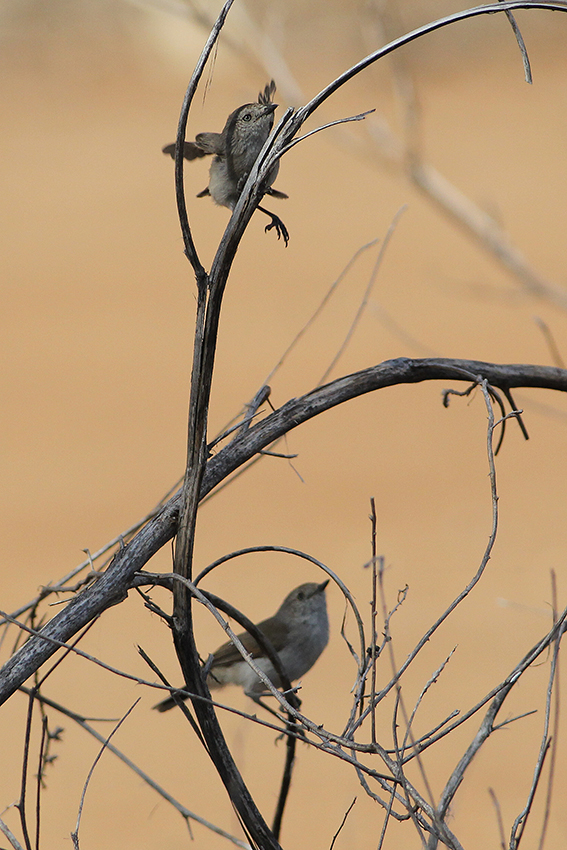
Chestnut-rumped thornbills (Sturt Desert, NSW).

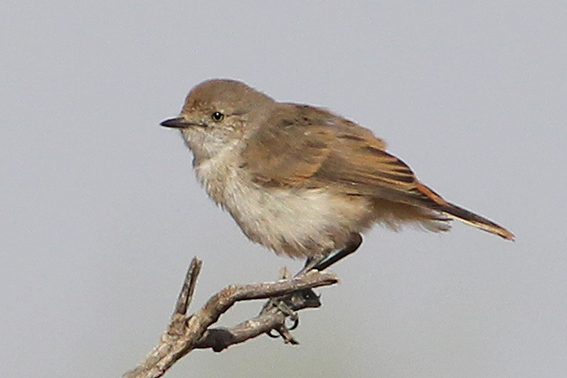
Chestnut-rumped thornbill (Sturt Desert, NSW).
