= List of birds of King Island (Tasmania) =

This is a list of bird species and subspecies that have been recorded on King Island, Tasmania, Australia.

== List of birds ==
Order	Genus	Species		Notes	Ref.	
Order	Genus	Common name	Binomial	Notes	Ref.	
Casuariiformes	Casuariidae	Common name	Binomial	Emu	Dromaius novaehollandiae	Introduced
Casuariiformes	Casuariidae	King Island emu (†)	Dromaius novaehollandiae minor or Dromaius minor	Endemic species/subspecies (extinct)		
Galliformes	Phasianidae	Wild turkey	Meleagris gallopavo	Introduced		
Galliformes	Phasianidae	Common pheasant	Phasianus colchicus	Introduced		
Galliformes	Phasianidae	Indian peafowl	Pavo cristatus	Introduced		
Galliformes	Odontophoridae	California quail	Callipepla californica	Introduced		
Anseriformes	Anatidae	Blue-billed duck	Oxyura australis			
Anseriformes	Anatidae	Cape Barren goose	Cereopsis novaehollandiae			
Anseriformes	Anatidae	Feral goose	Anser anser domesticus	Introduced		
Anseriformes	Anatidae	Musk duck	Biziura lobata			
Anseriformes	Anatidae	Black swan	Cygnus atratus			
Anseriformes	Anatidae	Australian wood duck	Chenonetta jubata			
Anseriformes	Anatidae	Australian shelduck	Tadorna tadornoides			
Anseriformes	Anatidae	Pacific black duck	Anas superciliosa			
Anseriformes	Anatidae	Australian shoveler	Anas rhynchotis			
Anseriformes	Anatidae	Gray teal	Anas gracilis			
Anseriformes	Anatidae	Chestnut teal	Anas castanea			
Anseriformes	Anatidae	Domestic duck	Anas platyrhynchos domesticus	Introduced		
Apodiformes	Apodidae	White-throated needletail	Hirundapus caudacutus			
Cuculiformes	Cuculidae	Pallid cuckoo	Cacomantis pallidus			
Cuculiformes	Cuculidae	Fan-tailed cuckoo	Cacomantis flabelliformis			
Cuculiformes	Cuculidae	Horsfield's bronze cuckoo	Chrysococcyx basalis			
Cuculiformes	Cuculidae	Shining bronze cuckoo	Chrysococcyx lucidus			
Columbiformes	Columbidae	Spotted dove	Spilopelia chinensis	Introduced		
Columbiformes	Columbidae	Brush bronzewing	Phaps elegans			
Gruiformes	Rallidae	Lewin's rail	Lewinia pectoralis			
Gruiformes	Rallidae	Buff-banded rail	Gallirallus philippensis			
Gruiformes	Rallidae	Spotless crake	Porzana tabuensis			
Gruiformes	Rallidae	Purple swamphen	Porphyrio porphyrio			
Gruiformes	Rallidae	Dusky moorhen	Gallinula tenebrosa			
Gruiformes	Rallidae	Eurasian coot	Fulica atra			
Podicipediformes	Podicipedidae	Hoary-headed grebe	Poliocephalus poliocephalus			
Charadriiformes	Scolopacidae	Latham's snipe	Gallinago hardwickii			
Charadriiformes	Scolopacidae	Bar-tailed godwit	Limosa lapponica			
Charadriiformes	Scolopacidae	Far Eastern curlew	Numenius madagascariensis			
Charadriiformes	Scolopacidae	Common greenshank	Tringa nebularia			
Charadriiformes	Scolopacidae	Grey-tailed tattler	Tringa brevipes			
Charadriiformes	Scolopacidae	Common sandpiper	Actitis hypoleucos			
Charadriiformes	Scolopacidae	Ruddy turnstone	Arenaria interpres			
Charadriiformes	Scolopacidae	Red-necked stint	Calidris ruficollis			
Charadriiformes	Scolopacidae	Sanderling	Calidris alba			
Charadriiformes	Haematopodidae	Pied oystercatcher	Haematopus longirostris			
Charadriiformes	Haematopodidae	Sooty oystercatcher	Haematopus fuliginosus			
Charadriiformes	Charadriidae	Red-capped plover	Charadrius ruficapillus			
Charadriiformes	Charadriidae	Double-banded plover	Charadrius bicinctus			
Charadriiformes	Charadriidae	Hooded dotterel	Thinornis rubricollis			
Charadriiformes	Charadriidae	Pacific golden plover	Pluvialis fulva			
Charadriiformes	Charadriidae	Banded lapwing	Vanellus tricolor			
Charadriiformes	Charadriidae	Masked lapwing	Vanellus miles			
Charadriiformes	Laridae	Pacific gull	Larus pacificus			
Charadriiformes	Laridae	Silver gull	Chroicocephalus novaehollandiae			
Charadriiformes	Sternidae	Caspian tern	Hydroprogne caspia			
Charadriiformes	Sternidae	Greater crested tern	Thalasseus bergii			
Charadriiformes	Sternidae	Fairy tern	Sterna nereis			
Sphenisciformes	Spheniscidae	Little penguin	Eudyptula minor			
Procellariiformes	Procellariidae	Short-tailed shearwater	Puffinus tenuirostris			
Procellariiformes	Diomedeidae	Black-browed albatross	Thalassarche melanophrys			
Procellariiformes	Diomedeidae	Shy albatross	Thalassarche cauta			
Procellariiformes	Diomedeidae	Atlantic yellow-nosed albatross	Thalassarche chlororhynchos			
Suliformes	Sulidae	Australasian gannet	Morus serrator			
Suliformes	Phalacrocoracidae	Little pied cormorant	Microcarbo melanoleucos			
Suliformes	Phalacrocoracidae	Black-faced cormorant	Phalacrocorax fuscescens			
Pelecaniformes	Ardeidae	White-faced heron	Egretta novaehollandiae			
Pelecaniformes	Ardeidae	Cattle egret	Bubulcus ibis			
Pelecaniformes	Ardeidae	Great egret	Ardea alba			
Pelecaniformes	Ardeidae	Australasian bittern	Botaurus poiciloptilus			
Pelecaniformes	Ardeidae	Nankeen night heron	Nycticorax caledonicus			
Accipitriformes	Accipitridae	White-bellied sea eagle	Haliaeetus leucogaster			
Accipitriformes	Accipitridae	Brown goshawk	Accipiter fasciatus			
Accipitriformes	Accipitridae	Swamp harrier	Circus approximans			
Strigiformes	Strigidae	Australian boobook	Ninox boobook			
Falconiformes	Falconidae	Brown falcon	Falco berigora			
Falconiformes	Falconidae	Australian hobby	Falco longipennis			
Falconiformes	Falconidae	Nankeen kestrel	Falco chenchroides			
Psittaciformes	Cacatuidae	Yellow-tailed black cockatoo	Calpytorhynchus funereus			
Psittaciformes	Cacatuidae	Sulphur-crested cockatoo	Cacatua galerita			
Psittaciformes	Psittacidae	Rainbow lorikeet	Trichoglossus haematodus			
Psittaciformes	Psittacidae	Orange-bellied parrot	Neophema chrysogaster			
Psittaciformes	Psittacidae	Blue-winged parrot	Neophema chrysostoma			
Psittaciformes	Psittacidae	Green rosella	Platycercus caledonicus	Endemic (to Tas.)		
Psittaciformes	Psittacidae	King Island green rosella	Platycercus caledonicus brownii	Endemic (to King Is.)		
Passeriformes	Maluridae	Superb fairywren	Malurus cyaneus			
Passeriformes	Pardalotidae	Spotted pardalote	Pardalotus punctatus			
Passeriformes	Pardalotidae	Striated pardalote	Pardalotus striatus			
Passeriformes	Acanthizidae	Tasmanian scrubwren	Sericornis humilis	Endemic (Tas.)		
Passeriformes	Acanthizidae	Scrubtit	Acanthornis magna	Endemic (Tas.)		
Passeriformes	Acanthizidae	King Island scrubtit (Greene's scrubtit)	Acanthornis magnus greeniana	Endemic (King Is.)		
Passeriformes	Acanthizidae	Brown thornbill	Acanthiza pusilla			
Passeriformes	Acanthizidae	King Island brown thornbill (Archibald's thornbill)	Acanthiza pusilla archibaldi	Endemic (King Is.)		
Passeriformes	Acanthizidae	Tasmanian thornbill	Acanthiza ewingii	Endemic (Tas.)		
