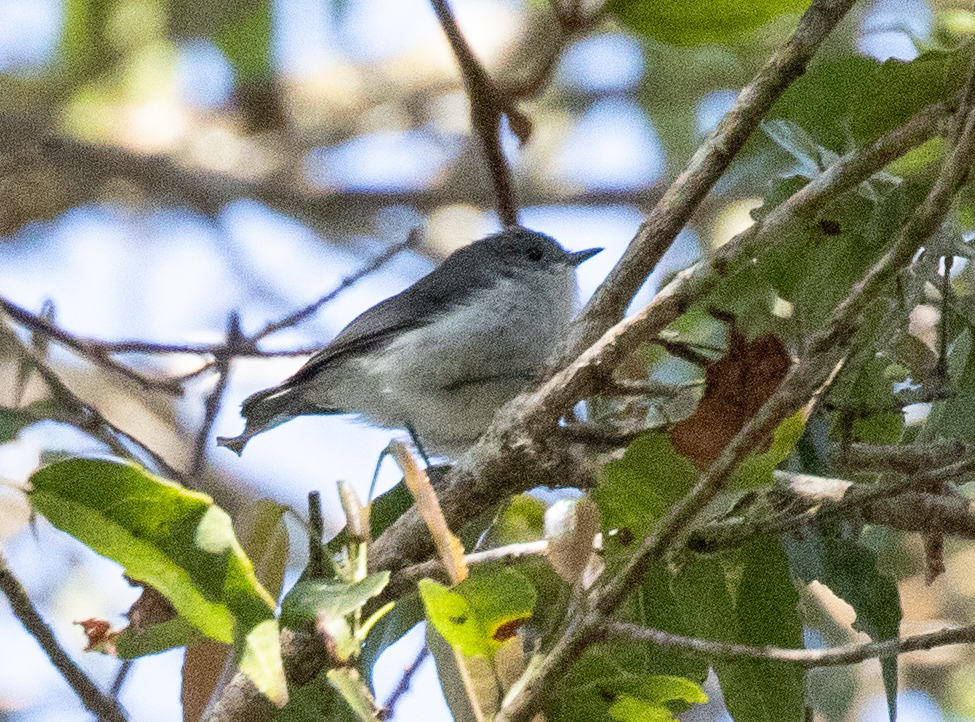

Conservation status
- Least Concern (IUCN 3.1)

Scientific classification
- Kingdom: Animalia
- Phylum: Chordata
- Class: Aves
- Order: Passeriformes
- Family: Acanthizidae
- Genus: Acanthiza
- Species: A. cinerea

Binomial name
- Acanthiza cinerea (Salvadori, 1876)

Synonyms
- Gerygone cinerea Salvadori, 1876

= Grey thornbill =

Species of bird

The grey thornbill, ashy gerygone or mountain gerygone (Acanthiza cinerea) is a species of bird in the family Acanthizidae. It is found in the New Guinea Highlands. Its habitat includes subtropical and tropical moist montane forests.
