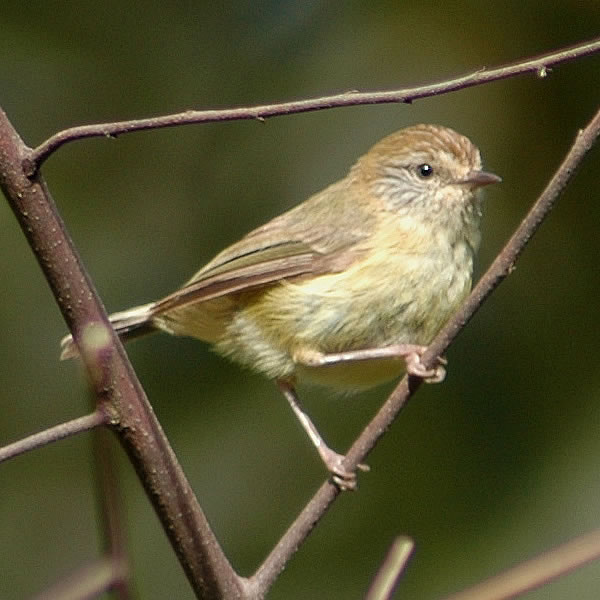
- Striated Thornbill (Acanthiza lineata)

Scientific classification
- Kingdom: Animalia
- Phylum: Chordata
- Class: Aves
- Order: Passeriformes
- Family: Acanthizidae
- Genus: Acanthiza; Vigors & Horsfield, 1827

Type species
- Motacilla pusilla Shaw, 1790

Species
- 14, see text.

= Acanthiza =

Genus of birds

Acanthiza is a genus of passeriform birds, most endemic to Australia, but with two species (A. murina and A. cinerea) restricted to New Guinea. These birds are commonly known as thornbills. They are not closely related to species in the hummingbird genera Chalcostigma and Ramphomicron, which are also called thornbills.

== Taxonomy ==
The genus Acanthiza was introduced in 1827 by the naturalists Nicholas Vigors and Thomas Horsfield with Motacilla pusilla Shaw, the brown thornbill as the type species. The genus name combines the Ancient Greek ακανθα/akantha meaning "thorn" with ζαω/zaō "to inhabit" or "to live".

They are found primarily in Australia and have a thin long beak. Colloquially the thornbill is sometimes referred to as a "tit" by locals, but in reality the Australian continent lacks any true tits, albeit Acanthiza species do show some similarities with tits in their behavior. They have a similar role as small insect-eating birds with titmice and kinglets. Like tits, Thornbills live in small groups foraging amidst trees and shrubs, and feed in a similar manner. Cooperative breeding is recorded from most species except the brown and Tasmanian thornbills.

The habitat preferences of the group vary from dense forest to open saltbush and bluebush plains.

Acanthiza follow a very characteristic undulating path when flying. Their diet is formed essentially of little insects and plant lice that these birds glean from foliage. They are also exceptional acrobats that are easily able to stay head downward like tits do.

The nest of the Acanthiza is a large dome-shaped construction, completely enclosed except for a side hole, just like that of the long-tailed tit; however Acanthiza adds to it an additional room whose function is unknown. It is somewhat similar to the Aegithalidae in combining long incubation periods with highly synchronous hatching. This combination, normally impossible due to intense competition for food, occurs because parents and (usually) helpers can organise food supply in such a manner that sibling competition for food is virtually absent.

The number of eggs usually ranges from two to four, and the incubation period is around twenty days with laying intervals of two days. The length of an adult bird is 8 to 10 centimetres (3.1 to 3.9 in).

== Species ==
The genus contains 14 species:

Image	Common name	Scientific name	Distribution
	Mountain thornbill	Acanthiza katherina	north-east Queensland, Australia
	Brown thornbill	Acanthiza pusilla	south-eastern Australia, Tasmania
	Inland thornbill	Acanthiza apicalis	Australia, New Guinea
	Tasmanian thornbill	Acanthiza ewingii	Tasmania and the Bass Strait Islands.
	New Guinea thornbill	Acanthiza murina	New Guinea
	Chestnut-rumped thornbill	Acanthiza uropygialis	Australia.
	Buff-rumped thornbill	Acanthiza reguloides	Eastern Australia.
	Western thornbill	Acanthiza inornata	southwestern Australia.
	Slender-billed thornbill	Acanthiza iredalei	Australia.
	Yellow-rumped thornbill	Acanthiza chrysorrhoa	southern and eastern Australia as well as Tasmania
	Yellow thornbill	Acanthiza nana	eastern coast of Australia.
	Grey thornbill	Acanthiza cinerea	New Guinea
	Striated thornbill	Acanthiza lineata	Australia
	Slaty-backed thornbill	Acanthiza robustirostris	Australia.
