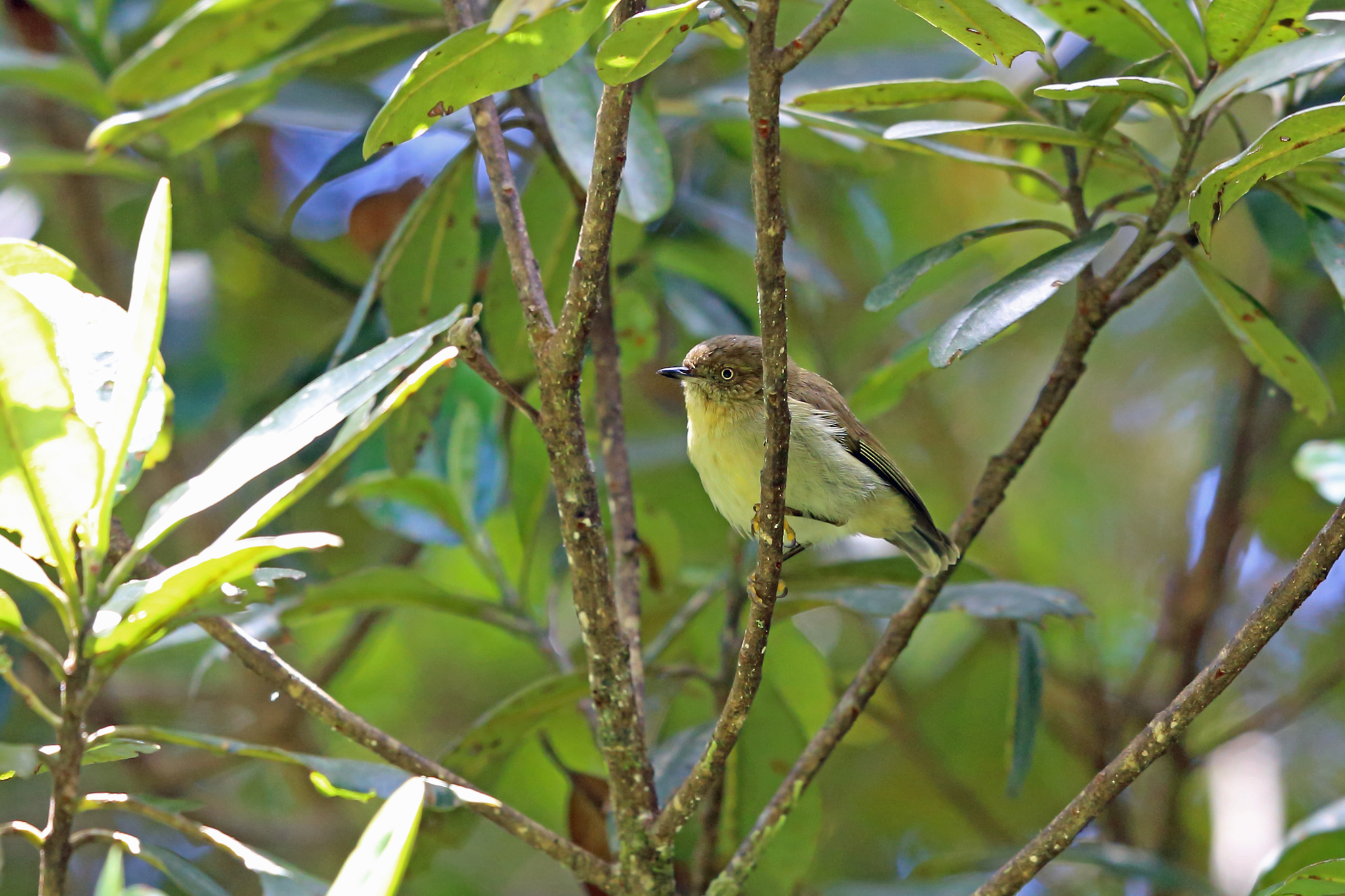

Conservation status
- Least Concern (IUCN 3.1)

Scientific classification
- Kingdom: Animalia
- Phylum: Chordata
- Class: Aves
- Order: Passeriformes
- Family: Acanthizidae
- Genus: Acanthiza
- Species: A. murina

Binomial name
- Acanthiza murina (De Vis, 1897)

= New Guinea thornbill =

Species of bird

The New Guinea thornbill or Papuan thornbill (Acanthiza murina) is a species of bird in the family Acanthizidae. It is found in the New Guinea Highlands.

Its natural habitat is subtropical or tropical moist montane forests.
