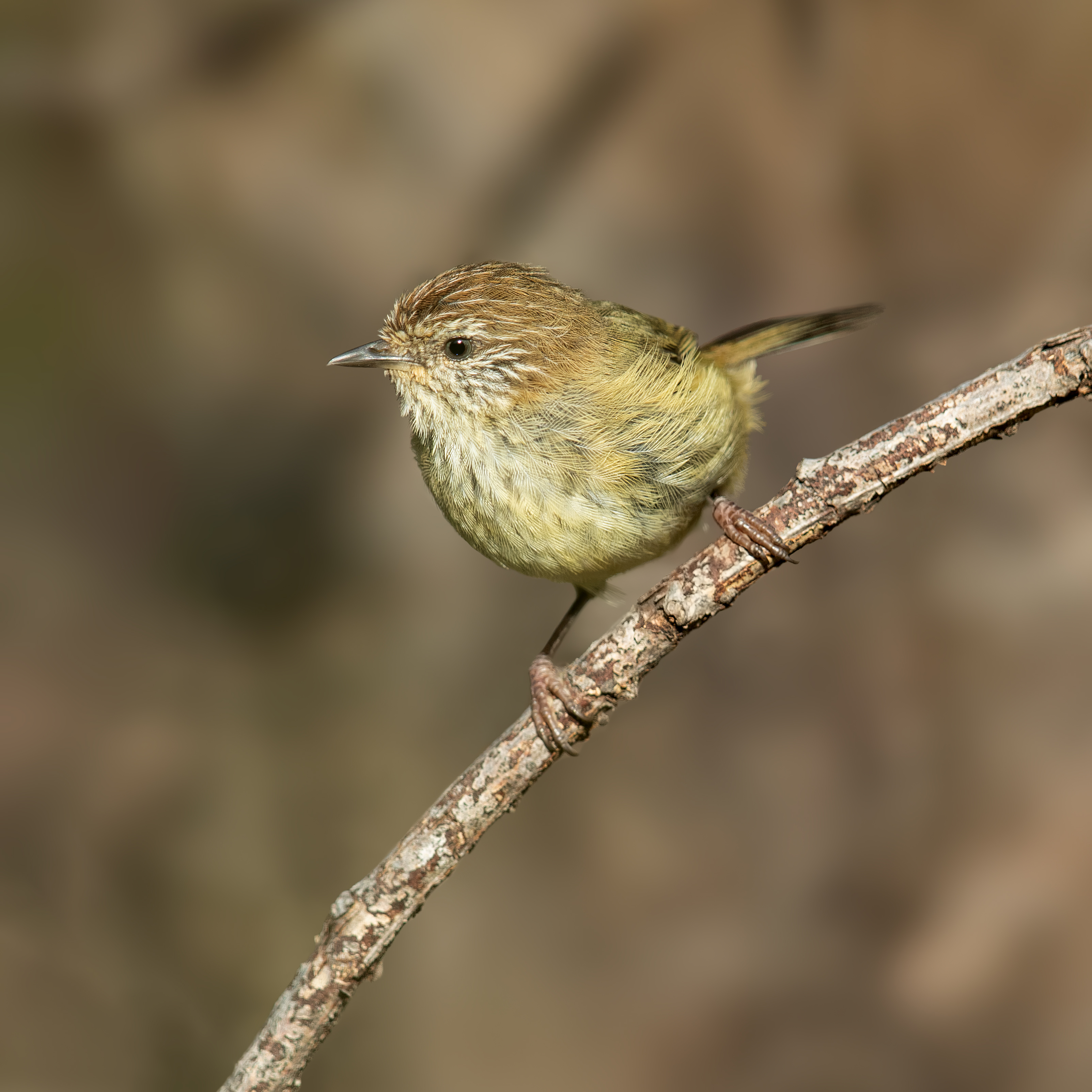

Conservation status
- Least Concern (IUCN 3.1)

Scientific classification
- Kingdom: Animalia
- Phylum: Chordata
- Class: Aves
- Order: Passeriformes
- Family: Acanthizidae
- Genus: Acanthiza
- Species: A. lineata

Binomial name
- Acanthiza lineata Gould, 1838

Subspecies
- Acanthiza lineata alberti Mathews, 1920; Acanthiza lineata clelandi Mathews, 1912; Acanthiza lineata lineata Gould, 1838; Acanthiza lineata whitei Mathews, 1912
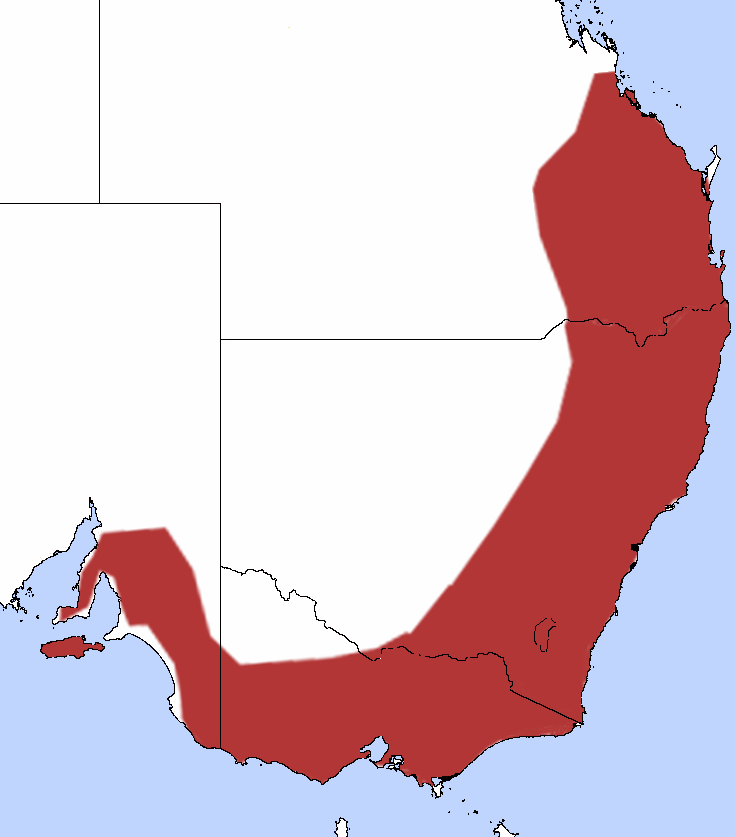
- Distribution in southeast Australia

Audio

= Striated thornbill =

Species of bird

The striated thornbill (Acanthiza lineata) is a species of bird in the family Acanthizidae. It is endemic to Australia, where its natural habitat is subtropical or tropical dry forests.

== Taxonomy ==
John Gould described the striated thornbill in 1838, giving it the common name of striated acanthiza. Alternative common names include striped-crowned thornbill or tit-warbler, striated tit-warbler or tit, and green thornbill.

The striated thornbill still bears its original name.

A 2017 genetic study using both mitochondrial and nuclear DNA found that the ancestor of the striated thornbill diverged from that of the yellow thornbill around 6 million years ago.

Four subspecies are recognised.

- Acanthiza lineata alberti is found in southeast Queensland and is paler and more yellowish overall than the nominate subspecies. It has a bright orange-brown cap with prominent white streaks, and a yellow-olive back. There is a broad zone of intermediate birds stretching from Tenterfield south to Port Macquarie on the coast and Tamworth inland.
- Acanthiza lineata lineata is found across New South Wales and Victoria, with a zone between the Grampians and Warrnambool, and the South Australian border where intermediate forms between this and clelandii are found.
- Acanthiza lineata clelandii is smaller and paler than the nominate subspecies, though has a more greyish back. It is found in southeastern South Australia to Adelaide.
- Acanthiza lineata whitei is smaller and darker than the nominate subspecies, with an overall greyish cast. It is found on Kangaroo Island.

== Description ==
The adult striated thornbill is 9–10 centimetres (3.5–3.9 in) long and weighs around 7 grams (0.25 oz). It has a russet- or orange-brown crown with cream streaks, dull yellow-olive upperparts, olive-grey flanks, and cream underparts heavily streaked with black.

The brown thornbill (A. pusilla) is similar but lacks the white-streaked orange-brown cap and lives in shrubs.

== Feeding ==
The striated thornbill is predominantly insectivorous, generally forages in the canopy of eucalypt trees, gleaning leaves for prey. It often hangs upside-down while foraging. The striated thornbill also visits and feeds on extra-floral nectaries on the leaves of sunshine wattle (Acacia terminalis), helping pollinate the plant as it brushes against flower heads while feeding.

== Breeding ==
Striated thornbills form flocks of 7–20 birds outside of breeding season from late summer to winter, before breaking up into groups of 2–4, composed of a breeding pair plus helper birds.
