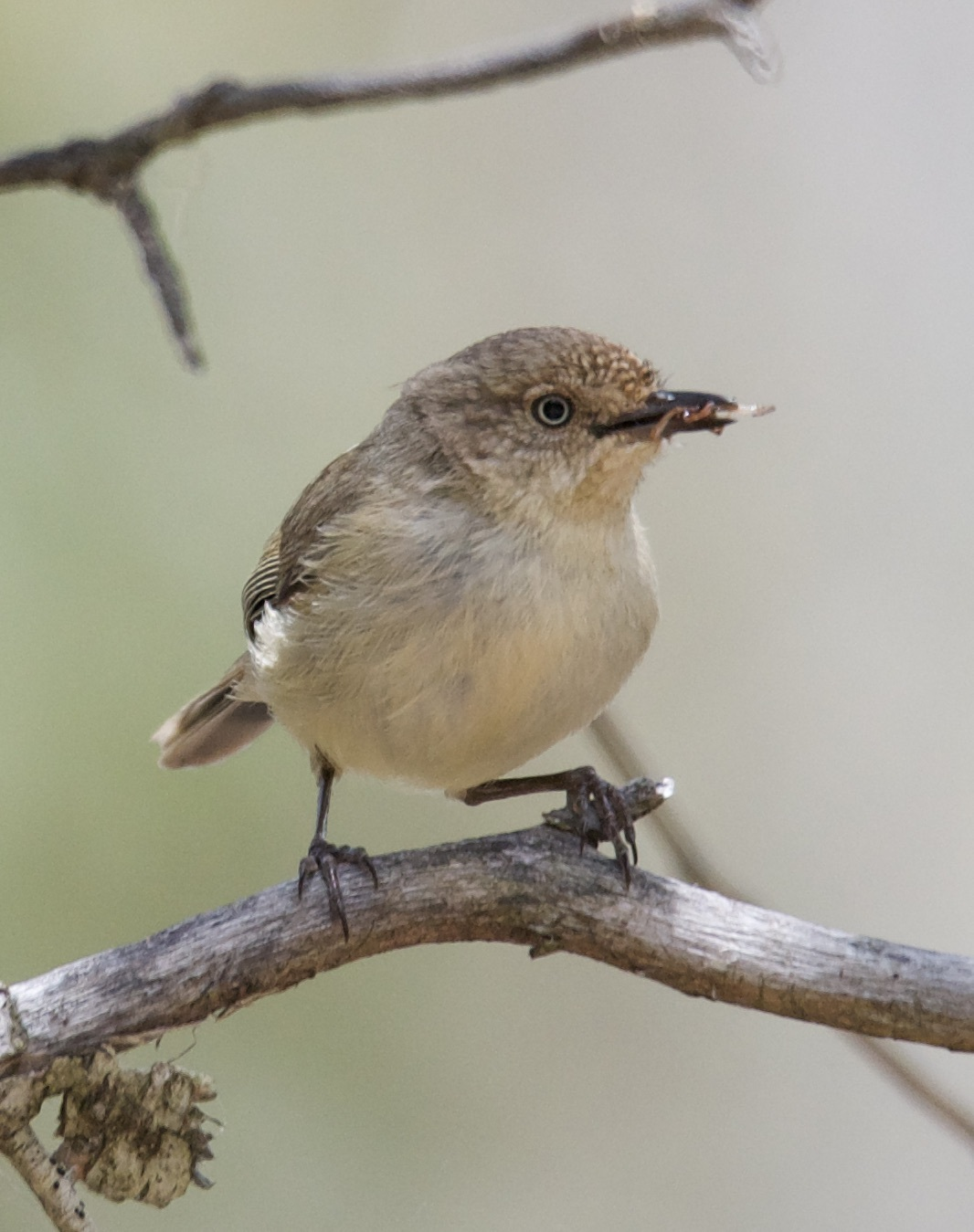

Conservation status
- Least Concern (IUCN 3.1)

Scientific classification
- Kingdom: Animalia
- Phylum: Chordata
- Class: Aves
- Order: Passeriformes
- Family: Acanthizidae
- Genus: Acanthiza
- Species: A. inornata

Binomial name
- Acanthiza inornata Gould, 1841

= Western thornbill =

Species of bird

The western thornbill (Acanthiza inornata) is a species of bird in the family Acanthizidae. They are classified as monotypic, with no recognized subspecies. It is endemic to Southwestern Australia.

== Description ==
The western thornbill measures around 8–10 centimetres (3.1–3.9 in) in length, with a weight of 6–8 grams (0.21–0.28 oz). It has a grayish-brown cap and back, and a creamy-white pale underbelly with a generally more brownish tint compared to other similar thornbills. It is most similar in appearance to the buff-rumped thornbill of Eastern Australia, but lacks the buff rump.

== Habitat and range ==
The western thornbill's preferred habitat is open woodlands, such as karri and jarrah forests, gardens, and coastal scrub, although it can also occasionally be found in paperbark swamps and banksia woodlands. The population is concentrated towards the south-west corner of Western Australia in and around Perth and further inland. Their range overlaps with several other thornbill species, including the slender-billed and inland thornbills. It is quite common throughout most of its range.

== Nesting ==
Dome-shaped nests are made from grass and bark, hidden down behind loose bark or under the skirts of grass trees. They lay a clutch of two to three freckled white eggs measuring 16 x 12 mm, with dots and blotches of reddish-brown.

== Breeding ==
Breeding takes place in the spring and summer between August and February.

== Diet ==
The western thornbill forages in trees, on the ground, and in low shrub foliage for insects. They occasionally join mixed-species flocks for feeding.

== Behaviour ==
They are normally found in pairs or in small flocks of 3-5 birds, and occasionally larger groups, although they can also be observed individually.
