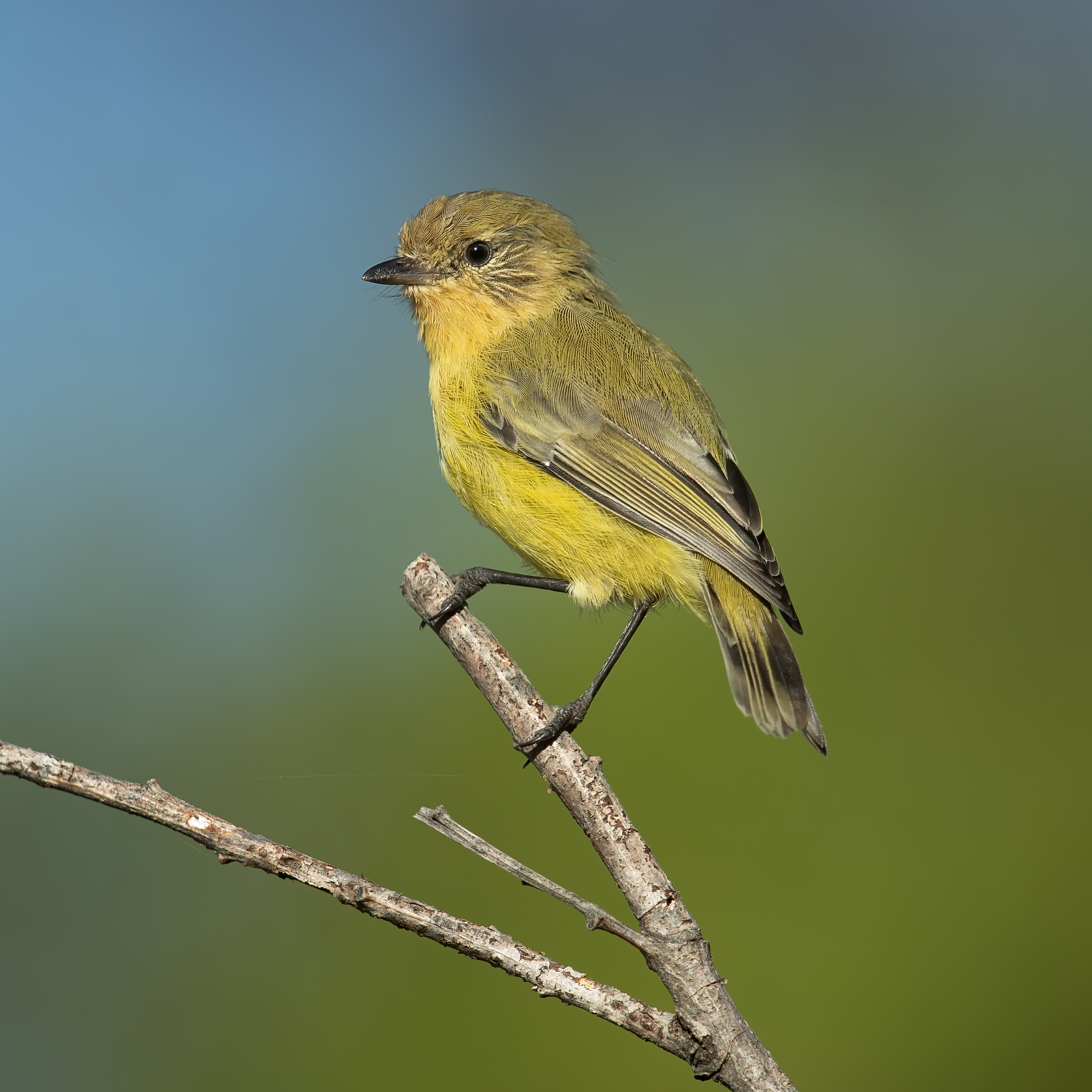

Conservation status
- Least Concern (IUCN 3.1)

Scientific classification
- Kingdom: Animalia
- Phylum: Chordata
- Class: Aves
- Order: Passeriformes
- Family: Acanthizidae
- Genus: Acanthiza
- Species: A. nana

Binomial name
- Acanthiza nana Vigors & Horsfield, 1827

Subspecies
- A. n. flava - White, HL, 1922; A. n. modesta - De Vis, 1905; A. n. nana - Vigors & Horsfield, 1827
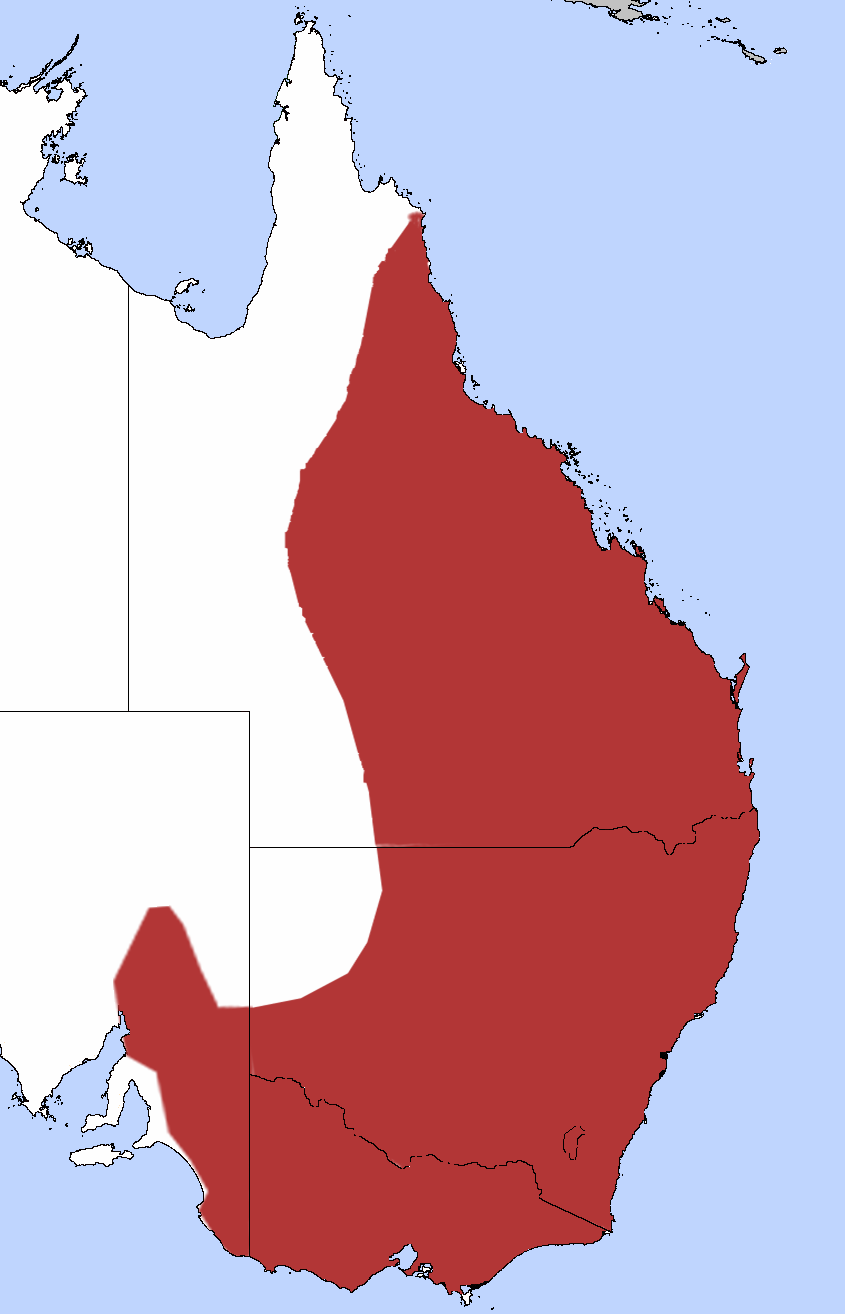
- Distribution of the yellow thornbill

= Yellow thornbill =

Species of bird

The yellow thornbill (Acanthiza nana), formerly known as the little thornbill, is a tiny passerine bird endemic to the eastern coast of Australia. While currently listed as Least Concern by the IUCN, the general consensus is that the population is decreasing.

== Taxonomy ==
Acanthiza nana was named by Irish zoologist N. A. Vigors and American naturalist Dr Thomas Horsfield in 1827, with the bird noted in the Sydney Cove area. However, the earliest field notes with type description record the yellow thornbill in 1803, with records sent at the time to the Linnean Society of London. The generic name Acanthiza derives from Ancient Greek akantheōn 'thorn-brake' and zaō 'live, inhabit'. The specific epithet nana is Latin for a 'female dwarf'. The yellow thornbill is one of 13 currently recognised species of thornbill within the genus Acanthiza. There are five species groups recognised within this genus, with the yellow thornbill (Acanthiza nana) most closely related to the striated thornbill (Acanthiza lineata). The only Acanthiza species which occurs outside Australia, the New Guinea thornbill (Acanthiza murina), also bears close molecular similarities to both the yellow and striated thornbills.

== Description ==
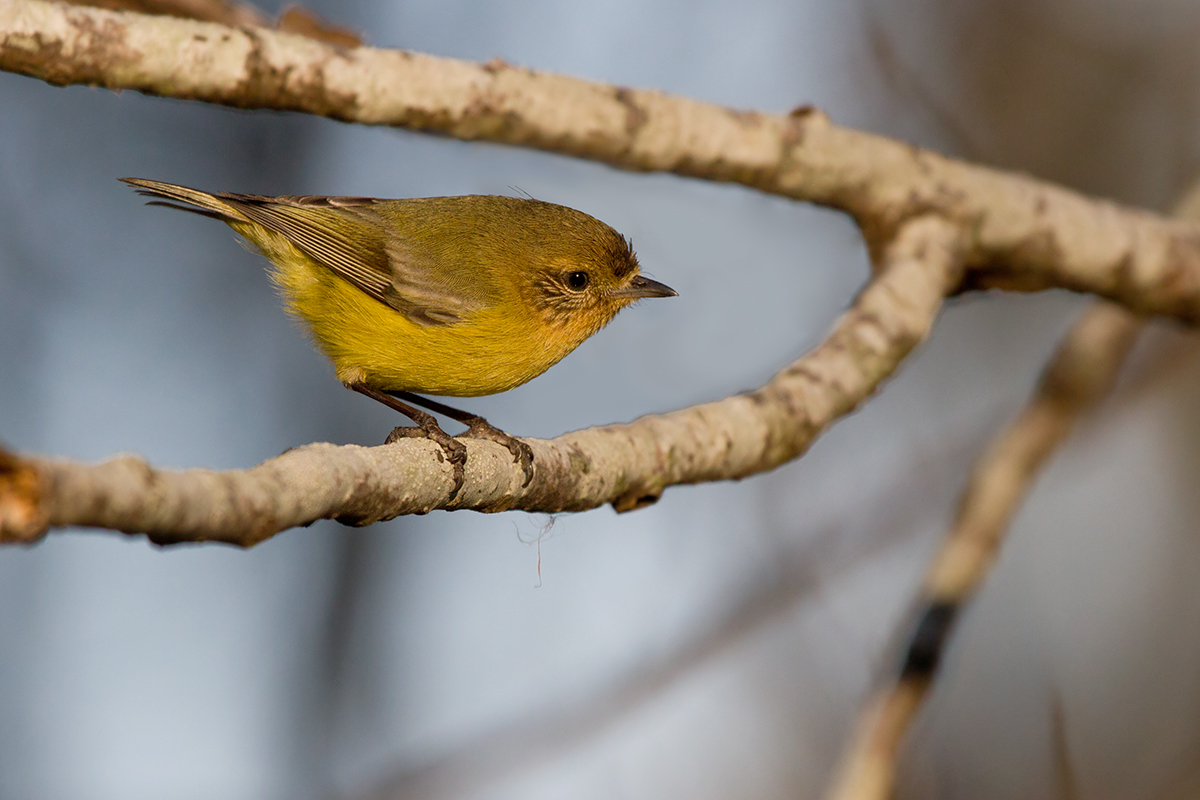
Adult yellow thornbill (Acanthiza nana).

Although similar to the striated thornbill and brown thornbill in both size and shape, the yellow colour of the yellow thornbill is more prominent. There is no sexual dimorphism, so that males and females look alike. They are around 9 cm (3.5 in) in length, with an average wing span of 14 cm (5.5 in), and weighing between 6–7 g (0.21–0.25 oz).

=== Adults ===
The back feathers are greenish, the primary and secondary wing coverts are olive-brown with a paler edge on the primaries that contrast with the alula. Upper- and under-tail are more dull than the rest of the body, and the same colour as the wings except for a dark brown-black subterminal band. Their throat and chin is a pale buff-orange that blends into the soft, creamy-yellow of the breast. Legs, toes, and bill are all black. Their eyes are dark brown with a grey outer-ring, although in some individuals the outer ring of the iris is almost white or pale brown. The eye-ring is narrow and cream in colour. The lores are also cream, with a slight grey tone. Belly

=== Juveniles ===
Juveniles appear similar to adults, though feathers are "softer" looking and duller by comparison . When recently fledged, their gape is still yellow. The yellow feathers on their belly are more subdued, and back and head feathers are more brown than olive.

== Behaviour ==
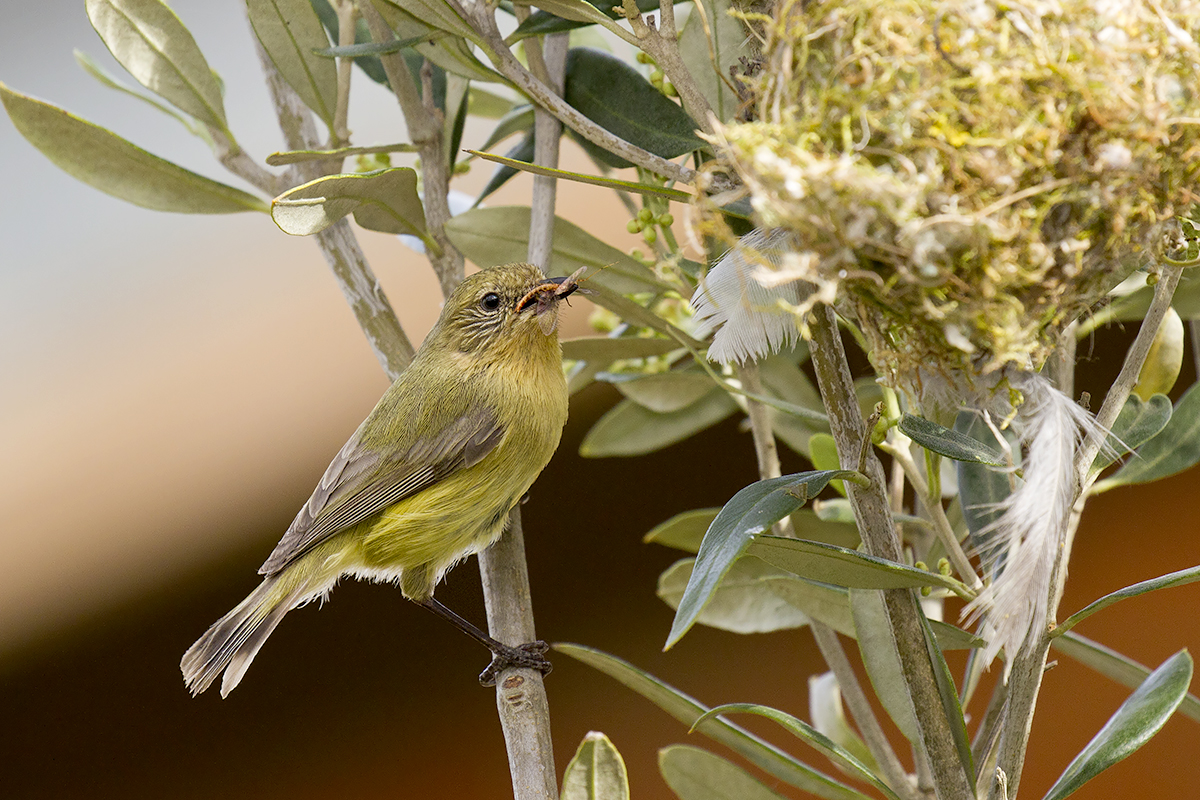
Yellow thornbill (Acanthiza nana) feeding young in the nest.

=== Breeding ===
The yellow thornbill likely breed in solitary pairs, but in some areas, evidence of co-operative breeding has been found. Yellow thornbill nests are rounded and domed, with a small entrance near the top. Nests are usually made of bark-fibre and grasses matted together with spider-web, located in the upper foliage of shrubs and small trees. Clutches of two to four eggs are laid soon after the nest has been completed, and are incubated for 16–17 days.

=== Vocalisation ===
The yellow thornbill has a loud, two-note tzid-id call, notably different from calls of the closely related striated thornbill by its harsher, less insect-like sound. The call is repeated at various intervals throughout the day and is associated with contact between birds while foraging, as defence, or as a territorial advertisement.

=== Feeding and diet ===
Occasionally, yellow thornbills have been observed in feeding flocks of up to 35 individuals, as well as mixed-species feeding flocks. More commonly, however, they are found in smaller groups or pairs. They prefer the upper and middle levels of forest canopy, and can be found moving rapidly through the outer foliage searching for food, or looking under bark. Their diet consists mostly of insects, but they will sometimes eat seeds. They will also catch insects mid-flight.

== Habitat and distribution ==
Yellow thornbills are found mainly within temperate and semi-arid areas, with their range just extending into the subtropical zone. Within these zones, yellow thornbills are found in a variety of habitats including shrublands, forests and thickets, preferring vegetation dominated by casuarinas or eucalypts, particularly in areas with a drier climate. Their range extends from northern and central west Queensland, south along the eastern coast of Australia through much of New South Wales, throughout Victoria and the Australian Capital Territory, and into the southeastern corner of South Australia.

== Conservation ==
Their current status according to the IUCN Red List is Least Concern, but with a decreasing population. In developed areas such as towns or industrial sectors, the yellow thornbill has only been recorded in older development areas and not at all in more recently developed areas. This correlates with observations of general bird populations in residential zones, with native birds decreasing when the native vegetation is removed. Fire also affects population numbers, with only the oldest age-class present after fires. In farmland which undergoes regular harvesting, yellow thornbills have not been recorded. Fire, land development, agricultural insecticides and climate change have also led to a decrease in insect populations, which for a largely-insectivorous bird could potentially hold severe complications in the future.
