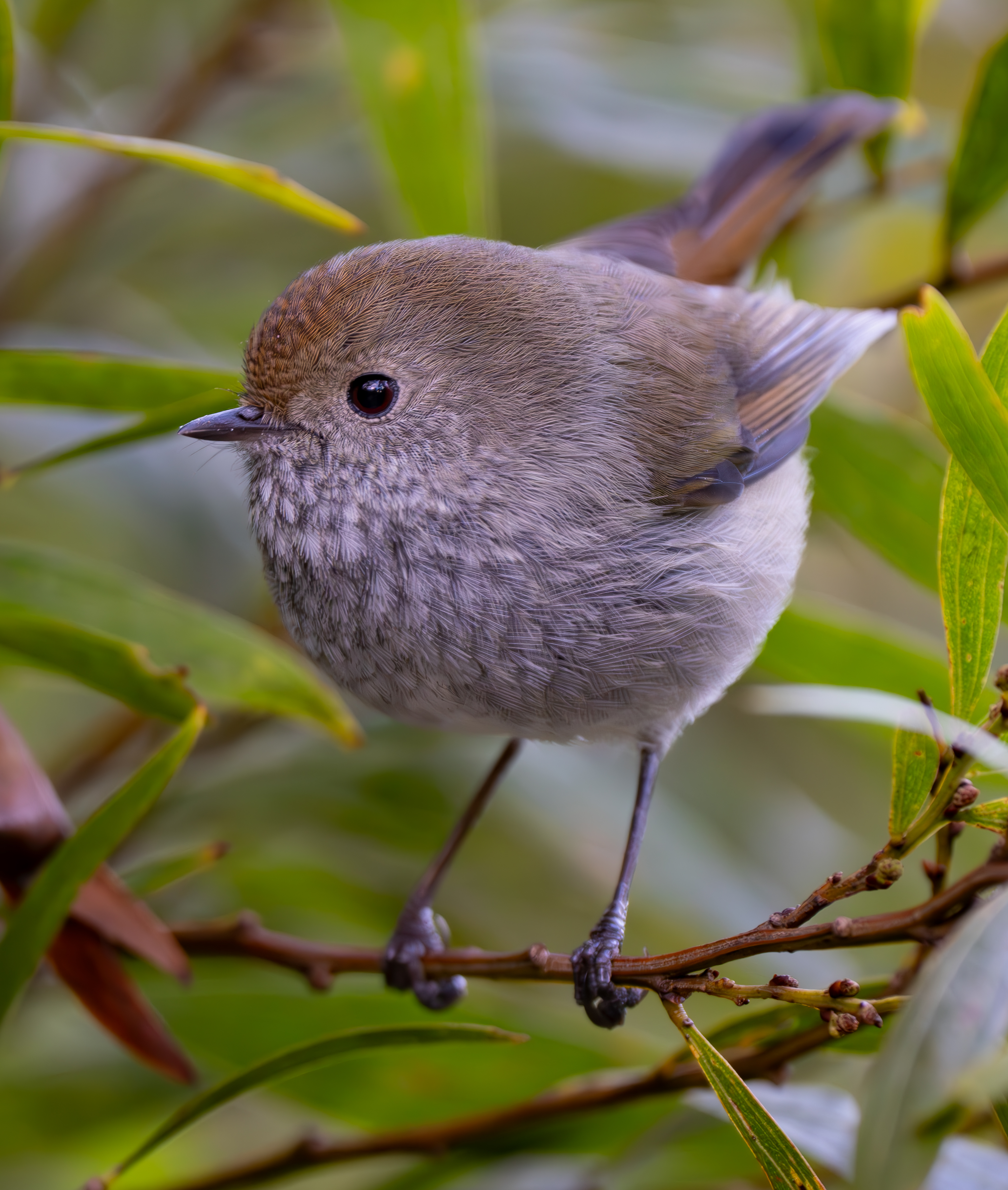

Conservation status
- Least Concern (IUCN 3.1)

Scientific classification
- Kingdom: Animalia
- Phylum: Chordata
- Class: Aves
- Order: Passeriformes
- Family: Acanthizidae
- Genus: Acanthiza
- Species: A. ewingii

Binomial name
- Acanthiza ewingii Gould, 1844

Subspecies
- A. e. ewingii - Gould, 1844; A. e. rufifrons - Campbell, AJ, 1903
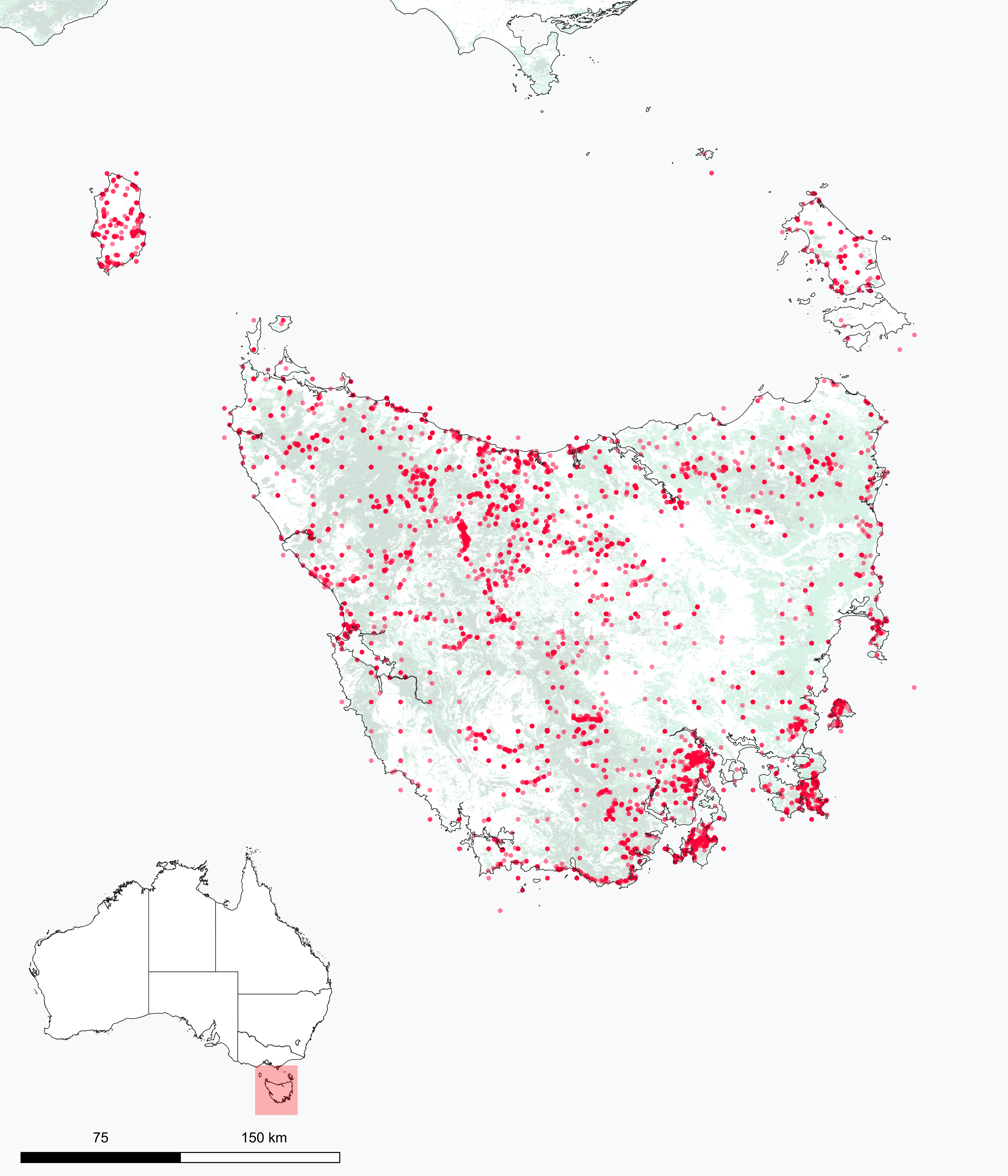
- Species distribution

= Tasmanian thornbill =

Species of bird

The Tasmanian Thornbill (Acanthiza ewingii) is a small bushland member of the Acanthizidae (Australian warbler) family, endemic to Tasmania and the Bass Strait Islands. It is a common bird in these regions and is often found occupying the colder, wetter portions of them. The brown thornbill (Acanthiza pusilla) will typically occupy the correspondingly drier portions of habitat.

== Description ==
The Tasmanian Thornbill is olive-brown above, darkening toward the back and tail, and can exhibit a patch of reddish-brown colouration on the forehead. The wings are dark grey with olive-brown edge lining. Grey on light grey scalloping is present from the chin to breast, with similar scalloping occurring on the sides of the head. The bill, feet, and legs are all dark grey and the eyes are distinctly large and dark, with red irises.

It's long, thin, thorn-shaped beak is a distinguishing characteristic of the Acanthiza (thornbill) family.

Visibly fluffy, white under-tail coverts are a distinguishing feature of the species.

The Tasmanian Thornbill averages in size at around 10 cm and shows no significant coloration or size differentiation between sexes.

=== Differentiating from Brown Thornbill ===
The Tasmanian and Brown Thornbills both occupy similar habitat, and are strikingly similar in appearance and behaviour, hence they are often easily confused.

There are five principal, physical, differences to distinguish between the two species:

1. The under-tail coverts of the Tasmanian Thornbill are clear white, while those of the brown thornbill are a duller greyish brown, hence the adage that the Tasmanian Thornbill "wears white underpants".
2. The edges of the primary feathers in the wing of the Tasmanian Thornbill contrast the wings at the edges much more than those of the brown thornbill.
3. The Tasmanian Thornbill has a longer tail.
4. The chin, throat, and breast of the Tasmanian Thornbill are greyer.
5. The forehead of the Tasmanian Thornbill shows little of the scalloping evident in that of the brown thornbill.

== Habitat and distribution ==
The Tasmanian thornbill is endemic to Tasmania and the Bass Strait Islands and is a common resident of rainforests, wet forests, and scrublands. It shares much of its range with the brown thornbill, but tends to occupy the wetter areas of the habitat, often choosing to live in dense scrub around wet gullies rather than the drier, more open slopes.

Temperate rainforest has been established to be the preferred habitat of the Tasmanian Thornbill, but its range of suitable habitats also include Mediterranean-style shrubby vegetation, bogs, marshes, fens, swamps, peatlands, and shrub-dominated wetlands.

The subspecies A. e. rufifrons (King Island Tasmanian Thornbill) occupies similar habitat but on King Island and is endemic there.

== Behaviour ==
=== Feeding ===
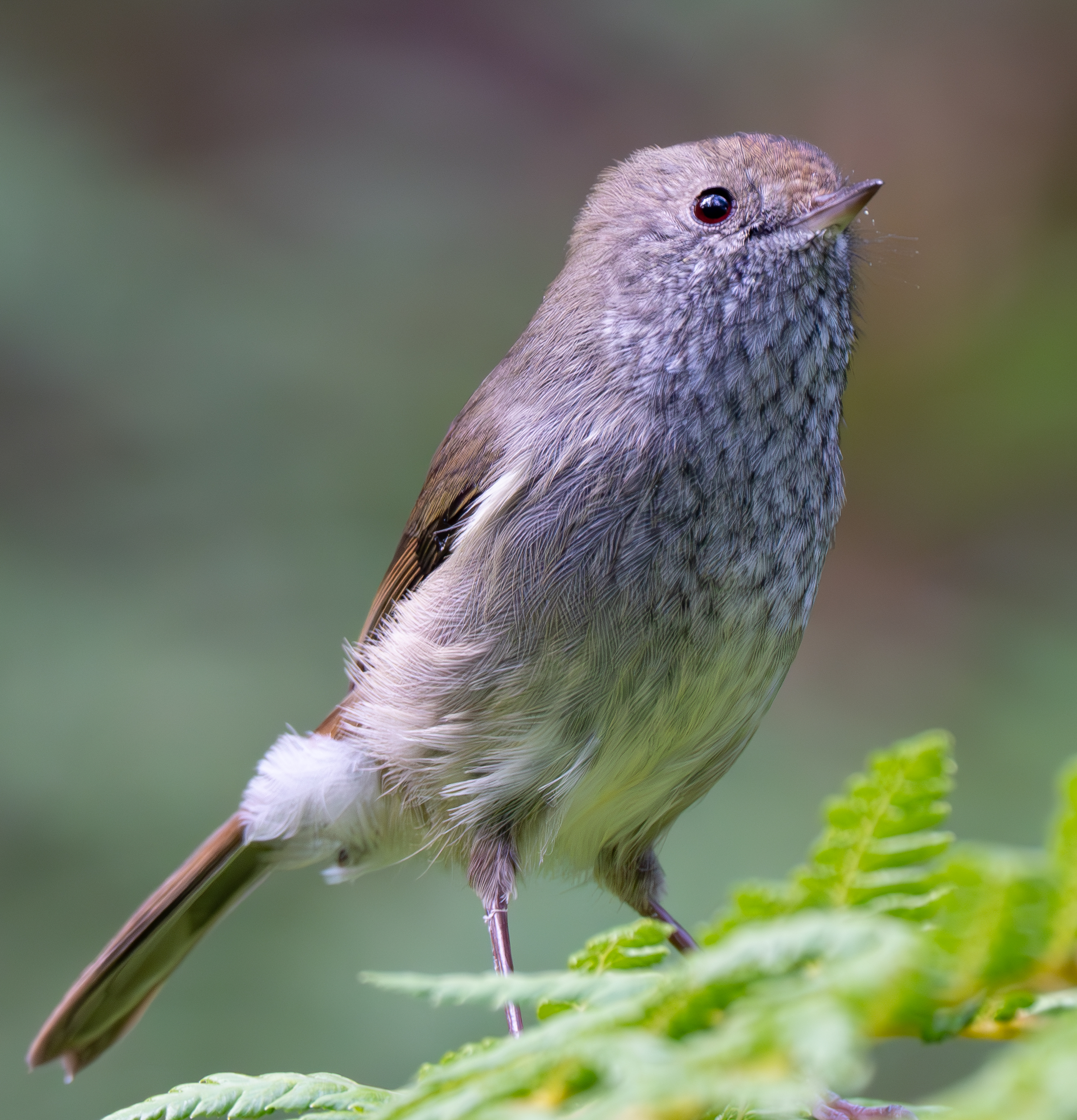
Tasmanian Thornbill. Fern Tree, Tasmania.

The Tasmanian thornbill is primarily insectivorous, but will sometimes include seeds and fruits into its diet. It is typically arboreal, and will forage at all levels of the forest including the ground, leaves, and the bark of trunks, branches, and twigs.

=== Breeding ===
Tasmanian Thornbills typically breed from September to January, and will build a small, neatly rounded, domed nest in low, dense vegetation. The nest itself is constructed of grass, green mosses, and fine strips of bark, and is enclosed at the entrance by a hinged flap. Within the nest, the thornbill will lay 3 or 4 eggs; however, neither the exact period of incubation of these eggs, nor the period from hatching to independence are known. The eggs themselves can range from off-white, with large brown freckles – concentrated toward the base of the egg, to a brown/bronze colour with smaller dotted dark brown/black freckles – again concentrated towards the base.

=== Vocalisation ===
The Tasmanian Thornbill has the warbling style of call that is characteristically attributed to the Acanthizidae (Australian warbler) family, and its main call has been described phonetically as a zit zit zit sound.

== Conservation ==
The Tasmanian Thornbill is common and widespread throughout Tasmania and the Bass Strait Islands, and has been classified by Birdlife International as a secure species of least concern on the ICUN Red List of Threatened Species.

However, due to ongoing habitat destruction and heavy pesticide use, its population is suspected to be in decline.
