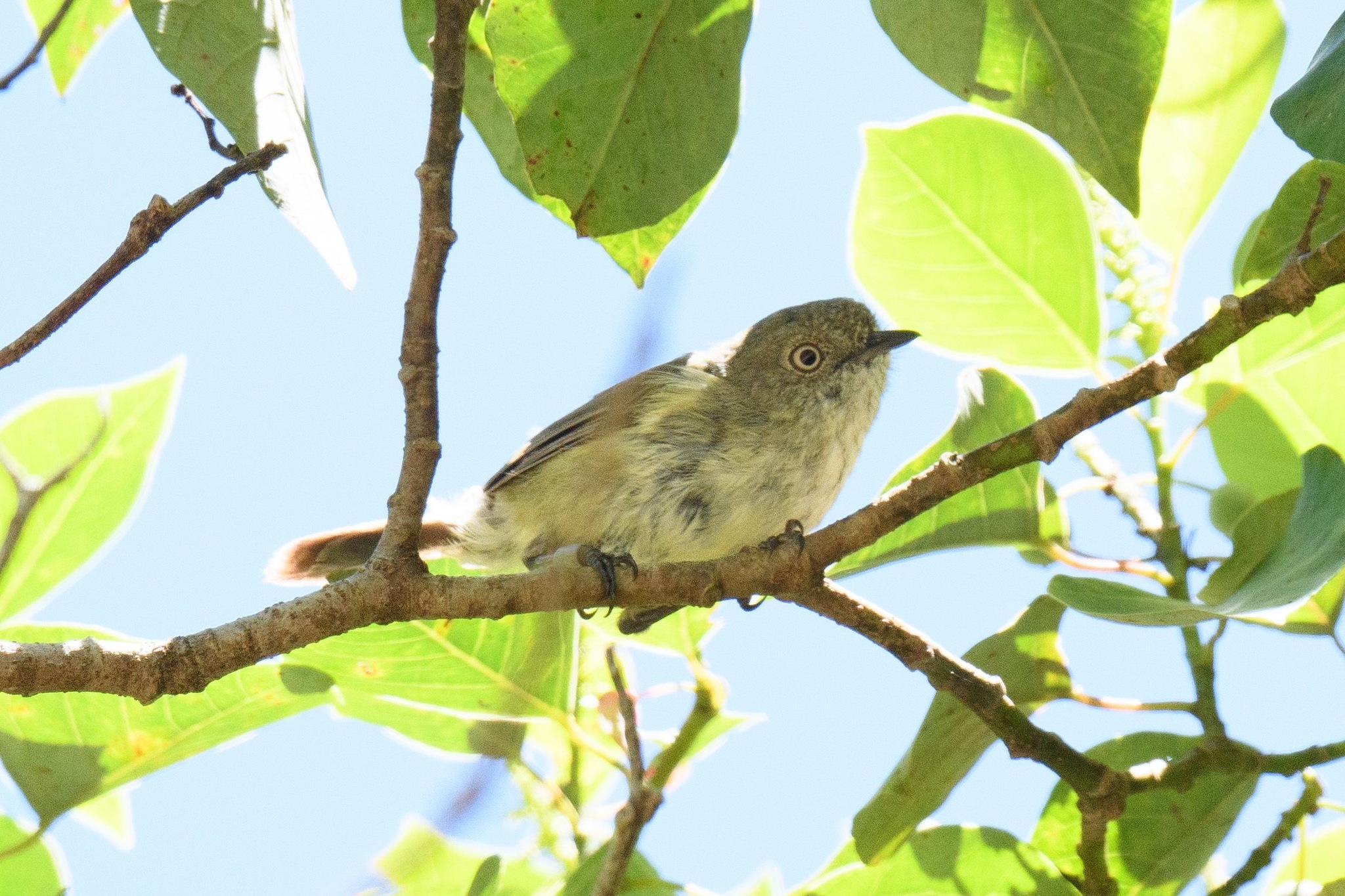
- Mountain thornbill on Mount Lewis, QLD

Conservation status
- Vulnerable (IUCN 3.1)

Scientific classification
- Kingdom: Animalia
- Phylum: Chordata
- Class: Aves
- Order: Passeriformes
- Family: Acanthizidae
- Genus: Acanthiza
- Species: A. katherina

Binomial name
- Acanthiza katherina De Vis, 1905
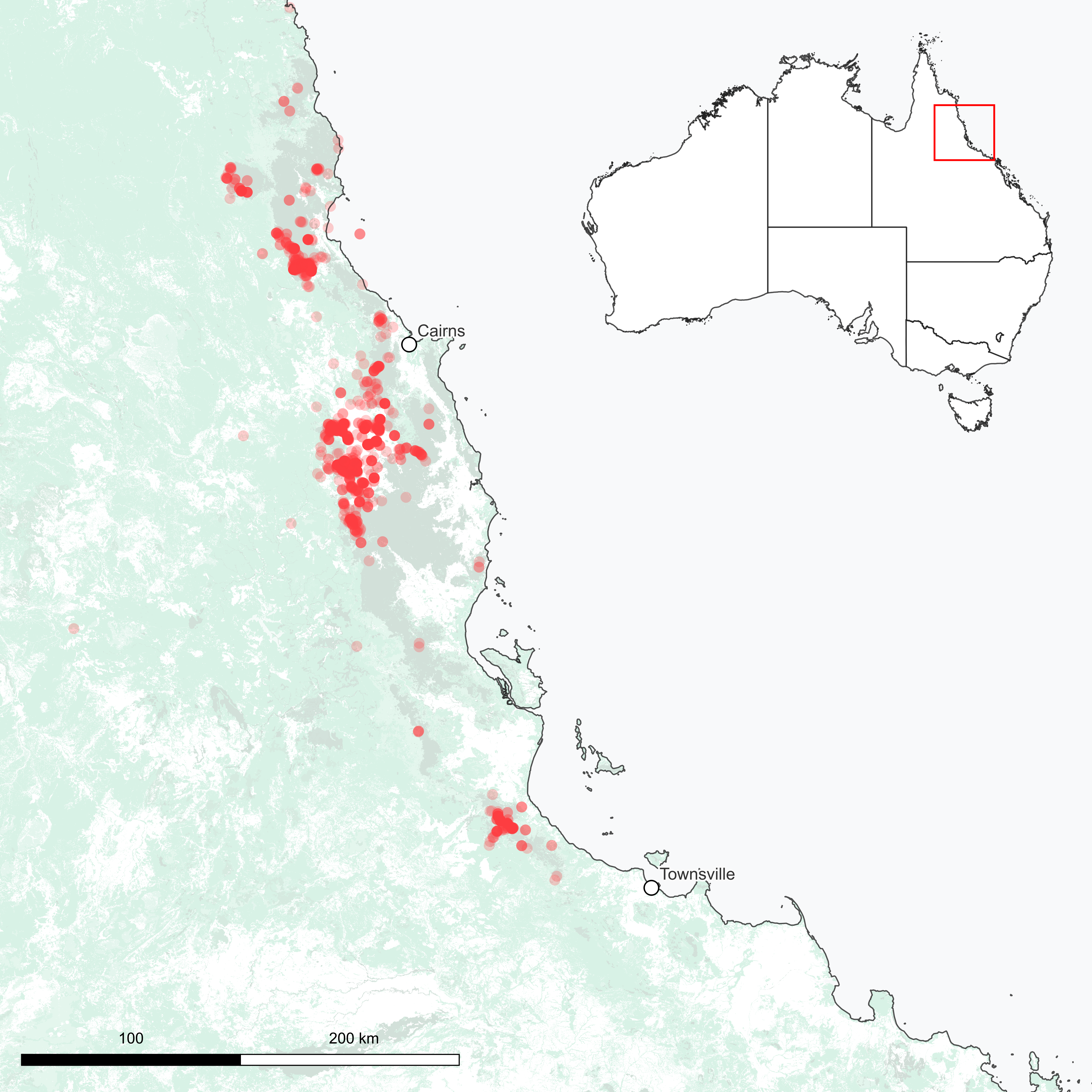
- Species distribution

= Mountain thornbill =

Species of bird

The mountain thornbill (Acanthiza katherina) is a species of bird in the family Acanthizidae. It is endemic to Australia.

Its natural habitat is tropical rainforest on the Atherton Tableland in north-east Queensland.
