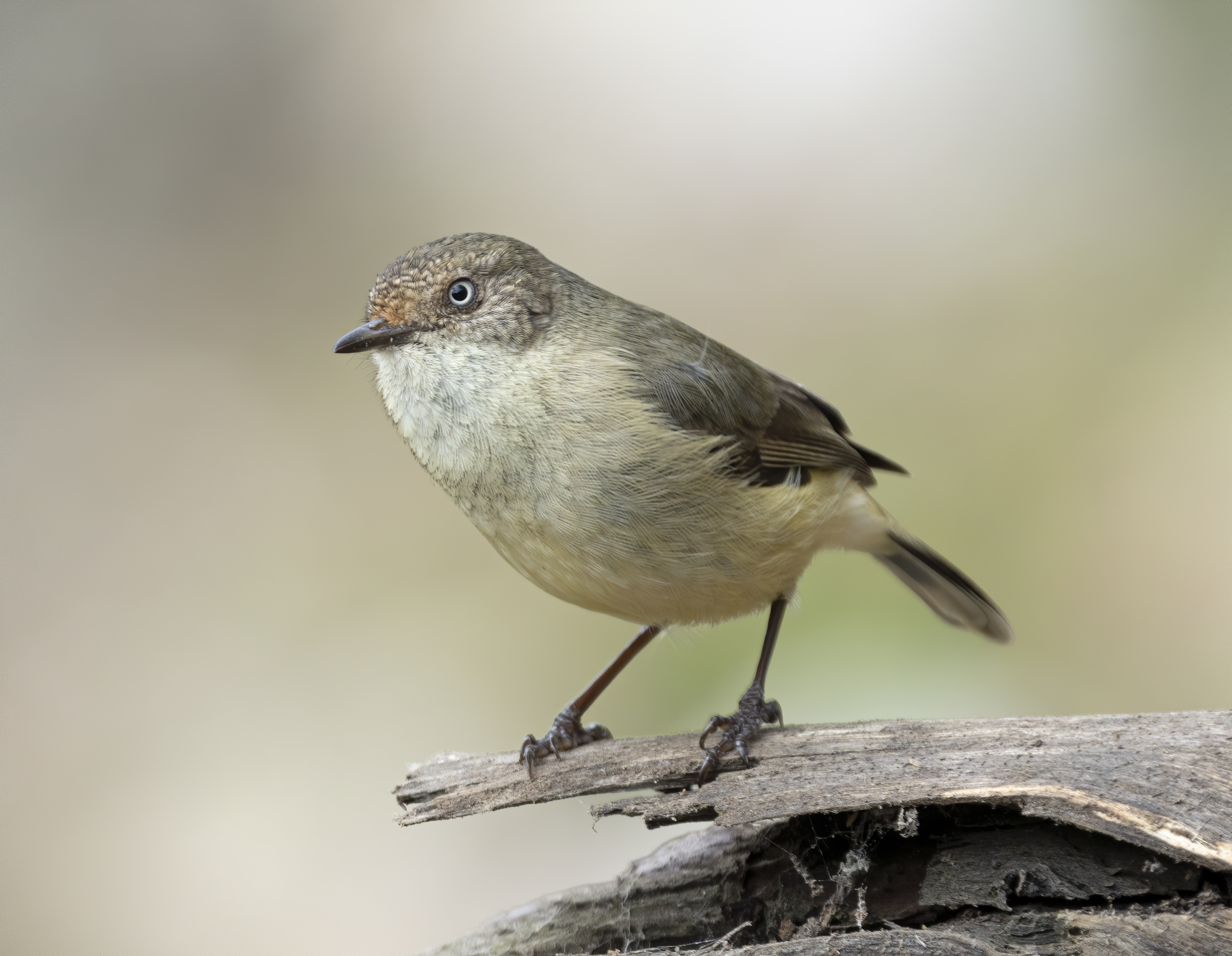

Conservation status
- Least Concern (IUCN 3.1)

Scientific classification
- Kingdom: Animalia
- Phylum: Chordata
- Class: Aves
- Order: Passeriformes
- Family: Acanthizidae
- Genus: Acanthiza
- Species: A. reguloides

Binomial name
- Acanthiza reguloides Vigors & Horsfield, 1827

Subspecies
- A. r. squamata - De Vis, 1889; A. r. nesa - (Mathews, 1920); A. r. reguloides - Vigors & Horsfield, 1827; A. r. australis - (North, 1904)

= Buff-rumped thornbill =

Species of bird

The buff-rumped thornbill (Acanthiza reguloides) is a small passerine bird species belonging to the genus Acanthiza, most of which are endemic to Australia. Measuring 8–10 cm in length, this unassuming thornbill is characterised by its plain greenish brown upperparts and very pale-yellow underparts, with a distinctive buff coloured rump. The tail has a broad, blackish band with a paler tip. Adults possess white irises, whilst juveniles have dark eyes. The buff-rumped thornbill is one of 14 species within the genus Acanthiza genus, which are recognisable by their thin, pointed bill. Species are unique in their plumage and distribution. Despite their shared name, the genus is not related to hummingbirds.

Wallangarra, S. Queensland, Australia

== Taxonomy ==
Early classifications of the genus Acanthiza based on plumage and morphology recognised one to three genera with a varying number of species in each. However, recent classifications have recognised one genus containing five species groups or four groups excluding the New Guinean murina.

The taxonomy of the Acanthiza reguloides has undergone significant change and debate since its early classification. Despite marked differences between A. reguloides and A. squamata, they have been combined as a single species since 1926. Four subspecies of Acanthiza reguloides are recognised. These are:

- Acanthiza reguloides subsp. australis
- Acanthiza reguloides subsp. nesa
- Acanthiza reguloides subsp. reguloides
- Acanthiza reguloides subsp. squamata

== Distribution and habitat ==
Primarily distributed in eastern Australia, the buff-rumped thornbill's range spans from Chinchilla, Queensland, west to Cobar, New South Wales, across Victoria and southeastern South Australia. This is an area of approximately 2 000 000 km2. This adaptable species thrives in dry sclerophyll forests and open eucalypt woodlands that have an open or sparse understorey.

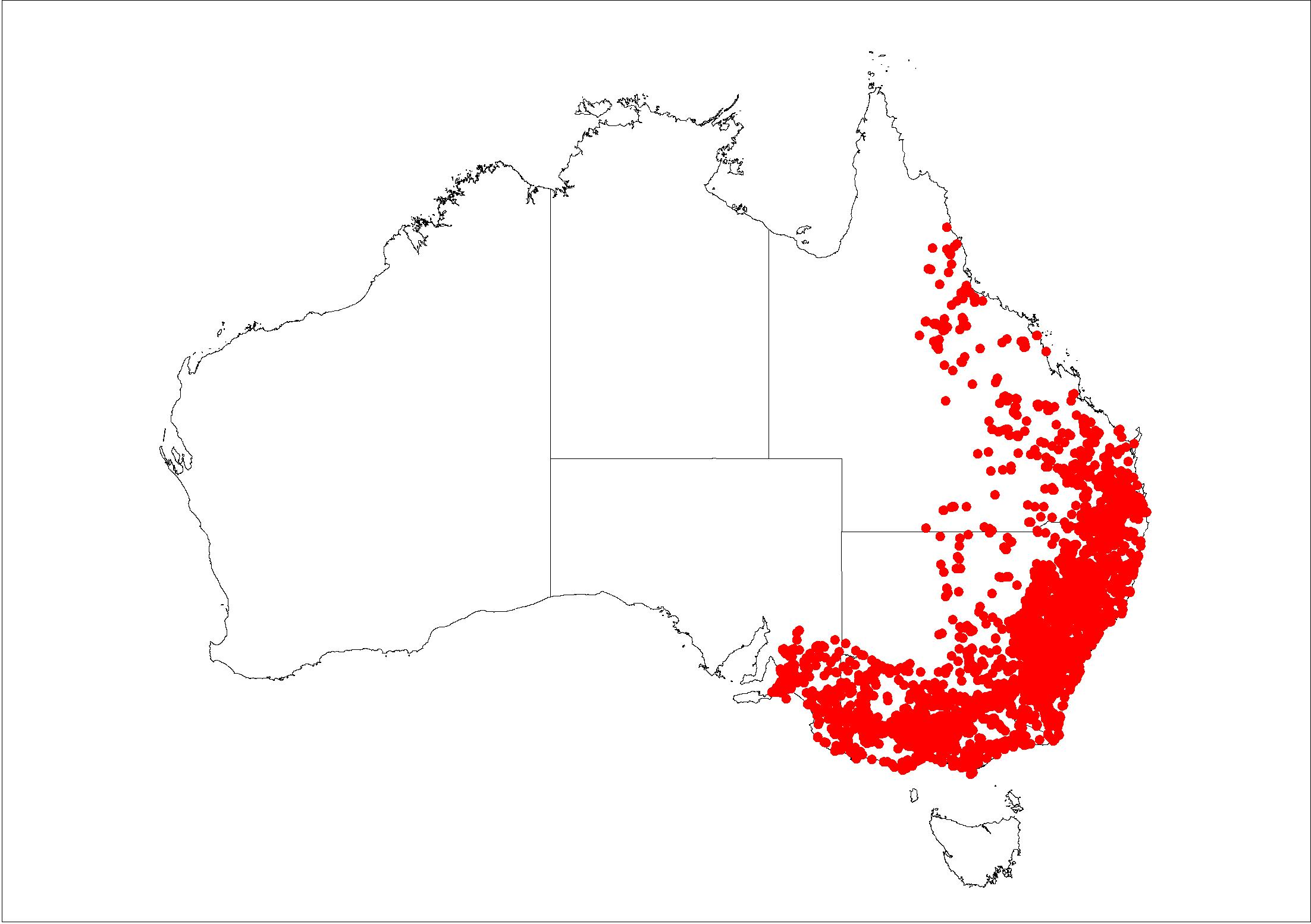
Distribution of Acanthiza reguloides within Australia. Retrieved from Birds in Backyards, 12 October 2023 from https://www.birdsinbackyards.net/species/Acanthiza-reguloides. Used with permission.

== Diet ==
The thornbill's diet consists primarily of small insects and plant lice gleaned from foliage. It occasionally eats seeds.

== Reproduction ==
A. reguloides builds a large, dome shaped nest consisting of bark strips, dried grass and moss located one to two metres above the ground. It is lined with fur, plant or down and bound with spider web on the outside. Thornbills work together cooperatively in groups consisting of usually one female and three males. Females typically lay clutches of 2-4 eggs in late August with an incubation period of 20 days. Egg hatching is highly synchronous and adults of the cooperative breeding group work together to feed the chicks. Adults grow to 8–10 cm in length. Horsfield's bronze-cuckoo (Chalcites basalis) is known to lay eggs in the nest of A. reguloides. Cuckoo nestlings learn to mimic the vocalisations of A. reguloides before evicting them from the nest.

== Behaviour ==
Buff-rumped thornbills are often found in small, chatty groups of approximately 20 individuals, but may join during non-breeding season to form larger clans. They continuously twitter as they forage. Their vocalizations are characterized by a rapid pitta-pitta-pitta-pit call. They have a hearing range of 5000 Hz and a hearing threshold of 10 dB. In flight, Acanthiza spp. exhibit a characteristic undulating path. These birds are exceptional acrobats, displaying a remarkable ability to remain head downward. Birds are known to be territorial.

== Conservation status ==
Bird populations are known to be secure in all states of Australia in which they are present. However, urban development and habitat modification has caused a decline in numbers in some areas.
