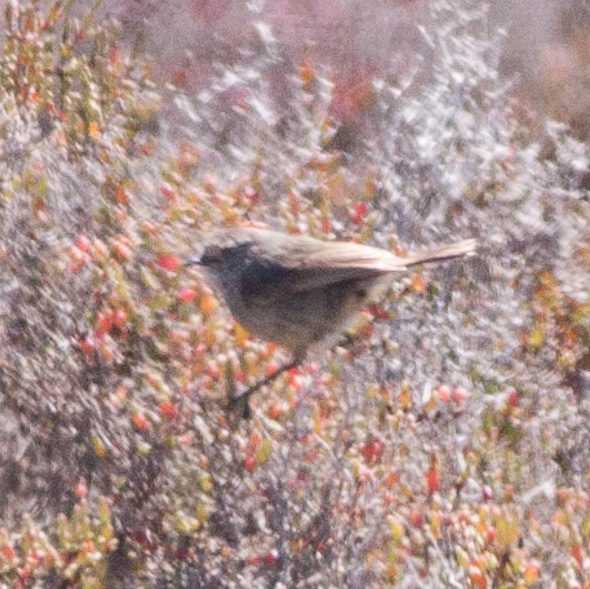

Conservation status
- Least Concern (IUCN 3.1)

Scientific classification
- Kingdom: Animalia
- Phylum: Chordata
- Class: Aves
- Order: Passeriformes
- Family: Acanthizidae
- Genus: Acanthiza
- Species: A. iredalei

Binomial name
- Acanthiza iredalei Mathews, 1911

Subspecies
- A. i. iredalei - Mathews, 1911; A. i. hedleyi - Mathews, 1912; A. i. rosinae - Mathews, 1913

= Slender-billed thornbill =

Species of bird

The slender-billed thornbill (Acanthiza iredalei) is a small bird native to Australia. It includes three sub-species:

- A. i. hedleyi
- A. i. iredalei
- A. i. rosinae

This thornbill can be found in shrublands and salt marshes, typically those around salt lakes or low heath on sand plains. It eats mostly insects and spiders captured in the shrubs of its habitat. It rarely feeds on the ground, preferring instead the higher elevations of shrubs and trees.

The slender-billed thornbill is rarely observed alone. They are usually seen in flocks of approximately 8-10 birds or in pairs. Thornbill nests are small and built in low shrubs. They are constructed of grass, bark, cobwebs, and other shrubland debris. Females lay up to three eggs during the breeding season, which runs from July until November.

== Description ==
The thornbill ranges from 9 to 10 centimeters in length. The colour of its back ranges from olive-grey to a darker olive-brown. The base of its tail is olive-yellow. Its underbelly is a smooth cream colour, and it has a dark bill and pale eyes.

== Distribution and habitat ==
The slender-billed thornbill iredalei subspecies has six separate and isolated populations in Western Australia, and a large population in the Carnarvon bioregion. The hedleyi subspecies is found in southeastern South Australia and western Victoria, and the rosinae subspecies is most commonly found in the Gulf St Vincent region of South Australia.

== Conservation status ==
The rosinae subspecies is considered vulnerable. The hedleyi subspecies is considered near threatened. The iredalei subspecies is also considered vulnerable.

The slender-billed thornbill (iredalei subspecies) is extinct in northern Australia, and is considered the only indigenous species to have become extinct in that region since European settlement.

=== Victoria ===
- The slender-billed thornbill (A. i. hedleyi) is listed as threatened on the Victorian Flora and Fauna Guarantee Act 1988. Under this Act, an Action Statement for the recovery and future management of this species has not been prepared.
- On the 2007 advisory list of threatened vertebrate fauna in Victoria, this species is listed as near threatened.
