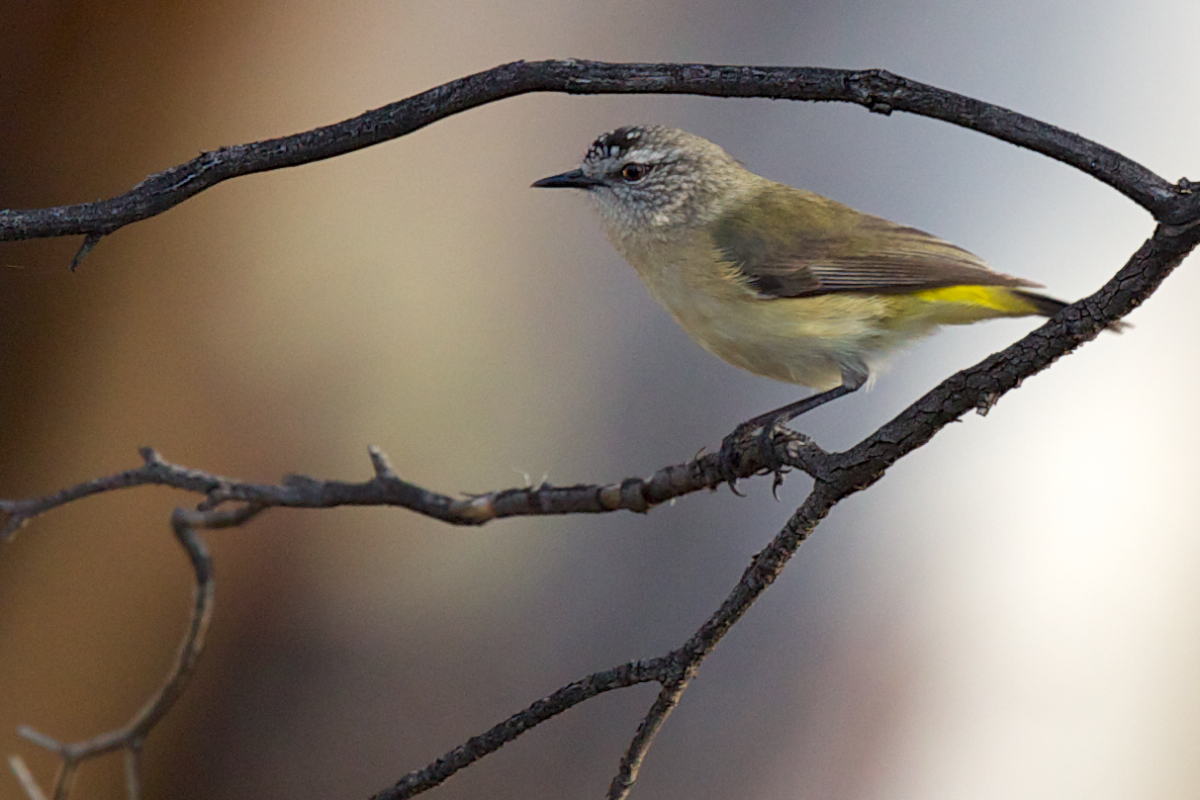

Conservation status
- Least Concern (IUCN 3.1)

Scientific classification
- Kingdom: Animalia
- Phylum: Chordata
- Class: Aves
- Order: Passeriformes
- Family: Acanthizidae
- Genus: Acanthiza
- Species: A. chrysorrhoa

Binomial name
- Acanthiza chrysorrhoa (Quoy & Gaimard, 1832)

Subspecies
- A. c. normantoni - (Mathews, 1913); A. c. leighi - Ogilvie-Grant, 1909; A. c. leachi - Mathews, 1912; A. c. chrysorrhoa - (Quoy & Gaimard, 1832)
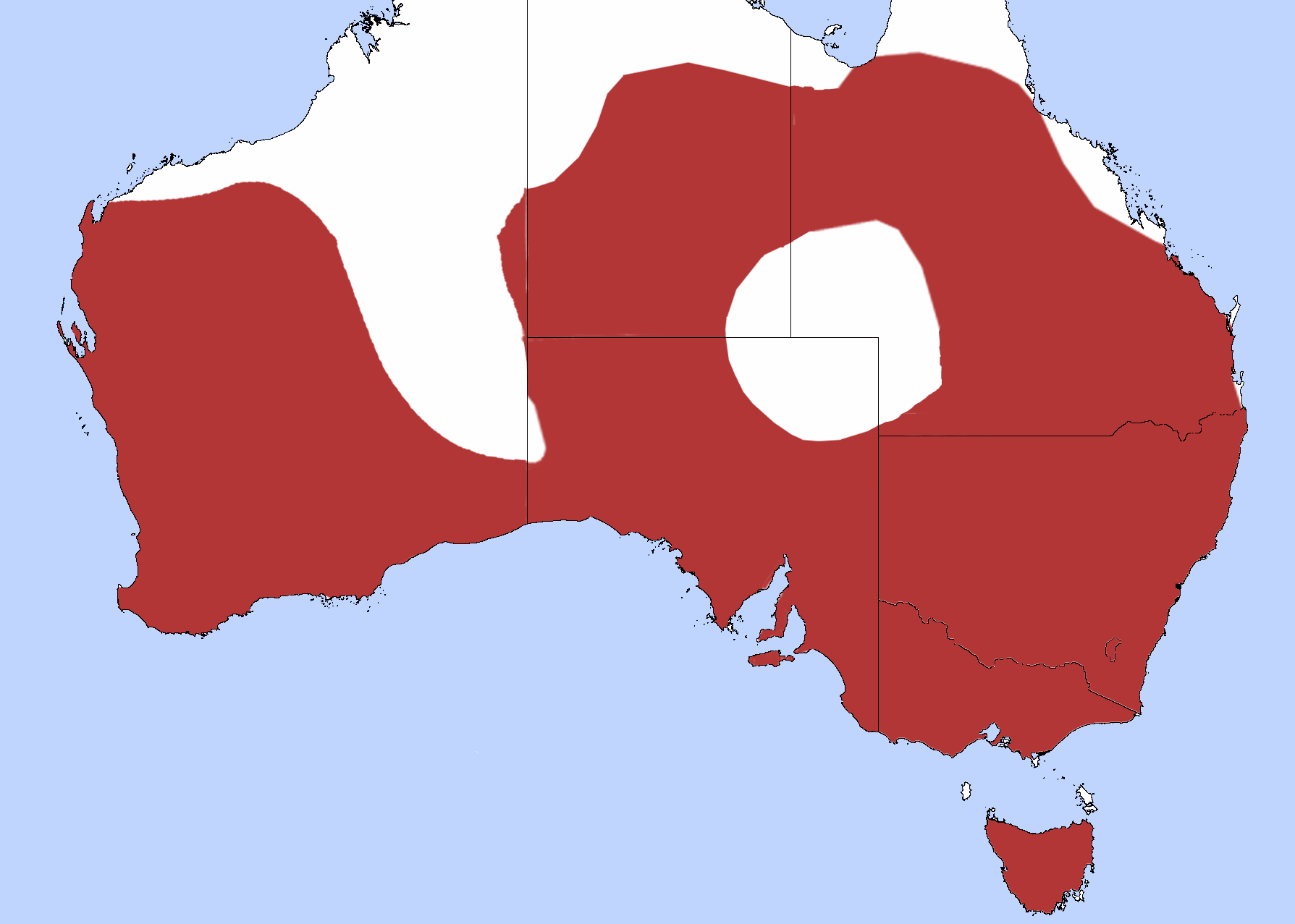
- Distribution of the yellow-rumped thornbill

= Yellow-rumped thornbill =

Species of bird

The yellow-rumped thornbill (Acanthiza chrysorrhoa) is a species of passerine bird from the genus Acanthiza. The genus was once placed in the family Pardalotidae but that family was split and it is now in the family Acanthizidae. There are four subspecies of yellow-rumped thornbill. It is a small, brownish bird with a distinctive yellow rump and thin dark bill. It inhabits savannah, scrub and forests across most of Australia and eats insects. The species engages in cooperative breeding.

== Taxonomy ==
The yellow-rumped thornbill was described as Saxicola chrysorrhoa by the French naturalists Jean René Constant Quoy and Joseph Paul Gaimard in 1830, from a specimen collected in King George Sound. The specific epithet derives from Ancient Greek khrysos 'gold' and orrhos 'rump'. Four subspecies are recognised: the nominate chrysorrhoa of Western Australia, leachi of Tasmania, leighi of eastern Australia, and normantoni of central and northern Australia. Butterbum is a colloquial name used by Australian birdwatchers.

A 2017 genetic study using both mitochondrial and nuclear DNA found the yellow-rumped thornbill was an early offshoot within the thornbill genus, its ancestor diverging from that of all other thornbills just over 10 million years ago.

== Description ==
The yellow-rumped thornbill is the largest species of thornbill, 9.5–12 cm (3.7–4.7 in) long and weighing 9 g (0.32 oz). It has a short tail and a long slender bill. The species has a distinctive yellow rump, a black forehead with white spots, grey head and neck, a white line above the eye and white throat. The belly is white with light buff below the wings. The wings are grey and the tail is black. The plumage varies somewhat, depending on subspecies.

=== Voice ===
The yellow-rumped thornbill has a distinctive song described as "twittering, musical, sweet, high-pitched". The species is also reported to be an accomplished mimic of other birds, in particular mimicking the alarm calls of the noisy miner.

== Distribution and habitat ==
The species has a wide distribution across western, southern and eastern Australia as well as Tasmania; it is absent from the north coast of Western Australia, parts of central Australia, northern Queensland and central and northern Northern Territory. The species inhabits a wide range of habitats, including open forest and woodland, grasslands, savannah and scrubland.

== Feeding ==
The yellow-rumped thornbill is insectivorous; major prey items include ants, beetles, bugs and lerps. Other items eaten include spiders, flies and seeds. The species usually forages in small groups of between 3 and 12 individuals, and may join mixed species-flocks with other small insectivorous passerines such as the speckled warbler (Pyrrholaemus sagittatus), weebill (Smicrornis brevirostris), and other species of thornbill.

== Breeding ==
Tamborine, SE Queensland, Australia

Breeding takes place from July to December, with one, two or even more broods a year. Nesting usually occurs as a pair, but sometimes one to three helpers will assist the breeding pair. The nest is a messy dome-shaped structure made of dried grass and other vegetation hidden low down among dense foliage or shrubs, or sometimes in vines or mistletoe. Atop the dome is a cup-shaped depression which serves as a false nest, while the real nest is inside with a concealed entrance. A clutch of three or four dull-white oval eggs, lightly spotted with red-brown mostly at the large end and each measuring 18 mm × 13 mm (0.71 in × 0.51 in), is laid. The female incubates the clutch, and the clutch takes around 16–18 days to hatch. On hatching both parents help feed the brood. The nestling period is around 19 days. The species is parasitised by the shining bronze-cuckoo and the fan-tailed cuckoo. Many species of bird take eggs and chicks from the nest, including red wattlebirds, currawongs, Australian magpies and ravens, and many honeyeaters will destroy their nests in order to steal nesting material. Ringing studies have found that the species can live for up to nine years.
