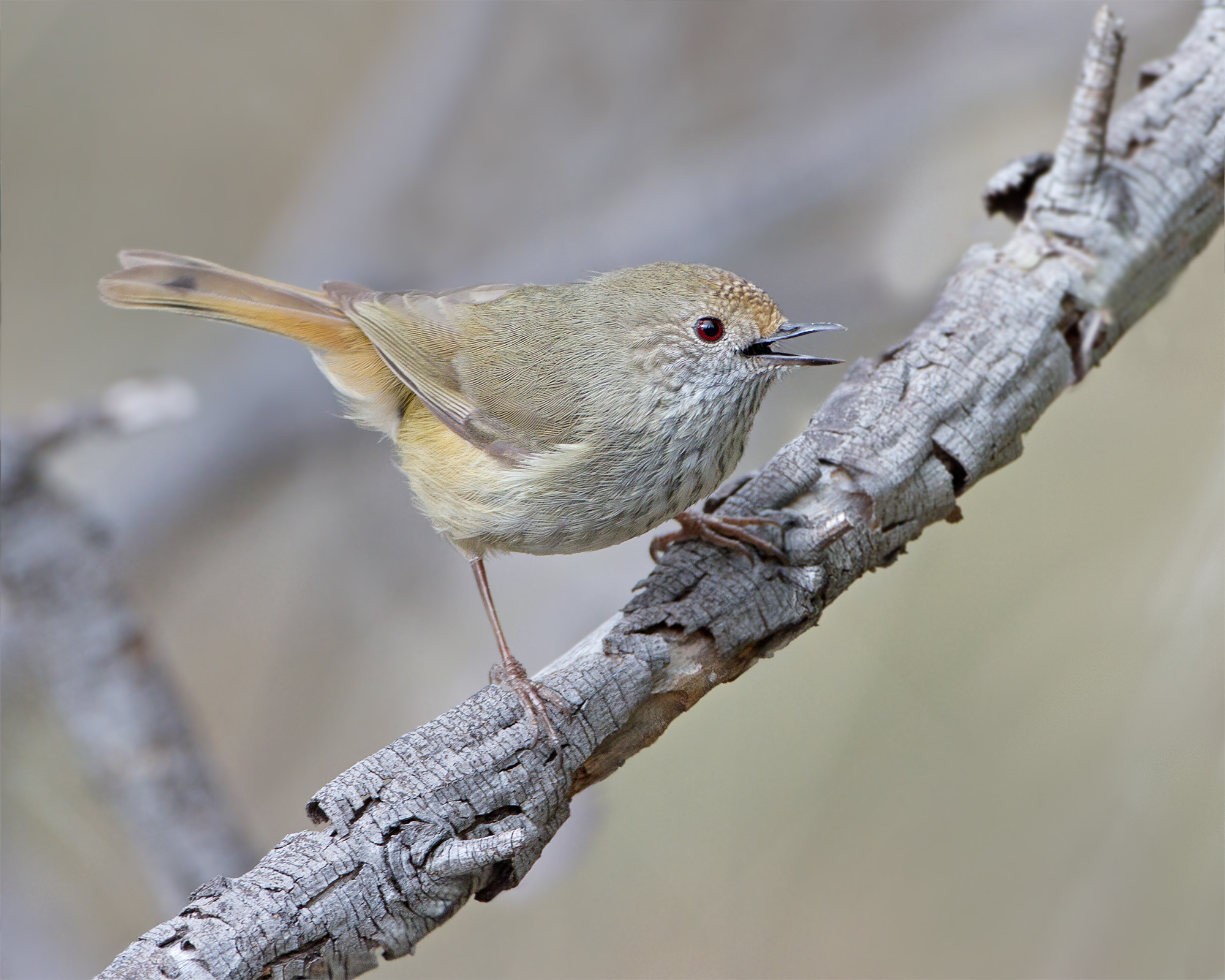

Conservation status
- Least Concern (IUCN 3.1)

Scientific classification
- Kingdom: Animalia
- Phylum: Chordata
- Class: Aves
- Order: Passeriformes
- Family: Acanthizidae
- Genus: Acanthiza
- Species: A. pusilla

Binomial name
- Acanthiza pusilla (Shaw, 1790)

Audio

= Brown thornbill =

Species of bird

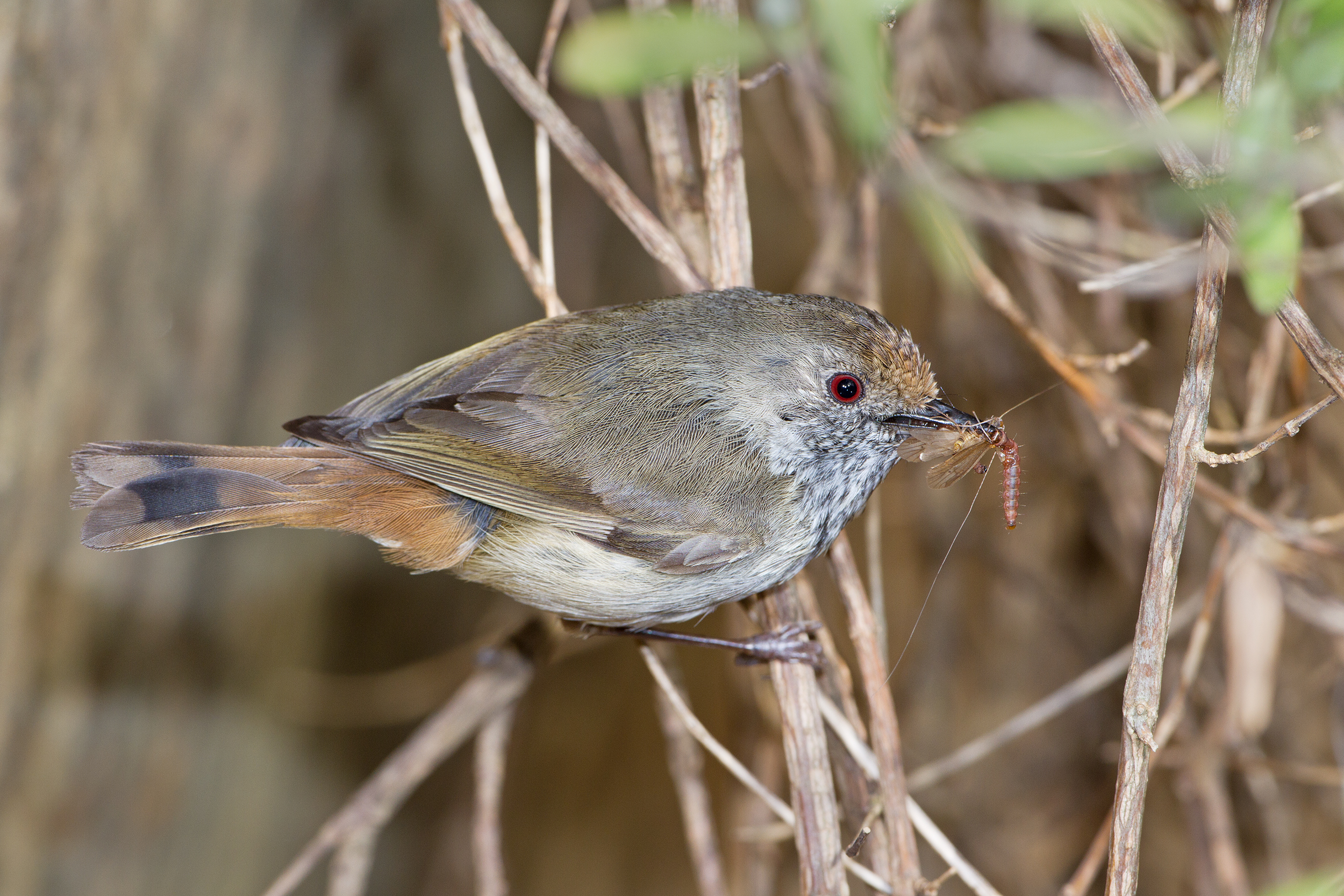
A brown thornbill

The brown thornbill (Acanthiza pusilla) is a passerine bird usually found in eastern and south-eastern Australia, including Tasmania. It can grow up to 10 cm (3.9 in) long, and feeds on insects. It is brown, grey and white. The species has five subspecies.

== Taxonomy ==
The brown thornbill is a member of the order Passeriformes, the family Acanthizidae, and the genus Acanthiza. It also has five subspecies: Acanthiza pusilla pusilla, A. p. diemenensis, A. p. zietzi, A. p. archibaldi, and A. p. dawsonensis. The species was first described by George Shaw in 1790. The nominate subspecies A. p. pusilla was described by Shaw in 1790 and the subspecies A. p. diemenensis was first described by John Gould in 1838. A. p. zietzi was described by Alfred John North in 1904, A. p. dawsonensis was described by Archibald George Campbell in 1922, and A. p. archibaldi was described by Gregory Mathews in 1910.

The generic name Acanthiza derives from Ancient Greek akantheōn 'thorn-brake' and zaō 'to live, inhabit'. The specific epithet derives from Latin pusillus 'very small'.

A 2017 genetic study using both mitochondrial and nuclear DNA found the ancestor of the brown thornbill diverged from that of the mountain thornbill around 2 million years ago.

== Description ==
The brown thornbill is warm brown to olive-brown above, with flanks of olive-buff to yellowish white. It has buff scallops on the forehead and large dark red eyes. There are blackish streaks on a grey throat and breast, a tawny rump and tail base, and a black subterminal band with paler tips on the tail.

The brown thornbill ranges in size from 9 to 10 cm (3.5 to 3.9 in), making it relatively small. It typically weighs 7 g (0.25 oz).

== Distribution and habitat ==
The brown thornbill can be found in the eastern and southeastern parts of Australia, including Tasmania. It is usually found within 300 kilometres (190 mi) of the coast. It shares a substantial part of its range with the inland thornbill on the western slopes of the Great Dividing Range and the Mt Lofty Ranges. It is also common in the Blue Mountains. The subspecies A. p. pusilla and A. p. diemenensis have been observed near the Australian Capital Territory and on Tasmania, respectively.

Brown thornbills live at elevations up to 1,200 m (3,900 ft). They are found in dry forests with dense undergrowth, rainforests, shrublands, coastal dune thickets, and in rushes and bracken along rivers and creeks. They are sedentary and common, except in the drier parts of their range.

== Behaviour ==
"Tiny birds cry wolf to scare predators" from the Australian National University

=== Vocalization ===
Brown thornbills are skilled mimics and also respond to humans imitating their calls. The calls have been described as "rich, musical warble". Their calls vary from a mellow baritone pee-orr, high whistles with rapid cascading trills, to many squeaks and churrs. Adult brown thornbills are able to mimic the alarm calls of other birds such as the New Holland honeyeater that warn of a raptor approaching, which deters other predators such as pied currawongs from attacking their nests.

=== Feeding ===
The brown thornbill is mainly an insectivore, including spiders, beetles, lerp insects, ants and grasshoppers in its diet. However, it may sometimes eat seeds, fruit, or nectar. It feeds restlessly close to the ground, in lower trees and shrubs of the understory. It often feeds in groups with other thornbills, except during the breeding season. It also forms mixed-species feeding flocks with the yellow-rumped thornbill (Acanthiza chrysorrhoa), the white-browed scrubwren (Sericornis frontalis), the speckled warbler (Pyrrholaemus sagittatus), and the eastern yellow robin (Eopsaltria australis).

=== Breeding ===
Brown thornbill couples tend to pair for a long time. Their nests are dome-shaped with a hooded side-entrance and built out of grasses, bark shreds, moss and feathers or plant down, lightly bound with spider webs, and usually set low in the undergrowth among ferns or tussocks. A clutch consists of two to four eggs, with three eggs being the most common. The eggs, measuring 16 mm × 12 mm (0.63 in × 0.47 in), are whitish with red-brown freckles towards the larger rounded end. They incubate for 19 days and have a nesting period of 16 days. Their breeding season extends from July to January.

== Conservation ==
The brown thornbill is widespread with a stable population and classified as least concern on the IUCN Red List.

The King Island brown thornbill (A. p. archibaldi) is considered to be critically endangered and most likely to go extinct, with very few sightings for many decades. A 2018 study ranked it first as the Australian bird most likely to go extinct. However, recent surveys indicate that there may be between 20 and 50 individuals of the subspecies living on the island and consequently a recovery program was expected to be formulated in late 2019.
