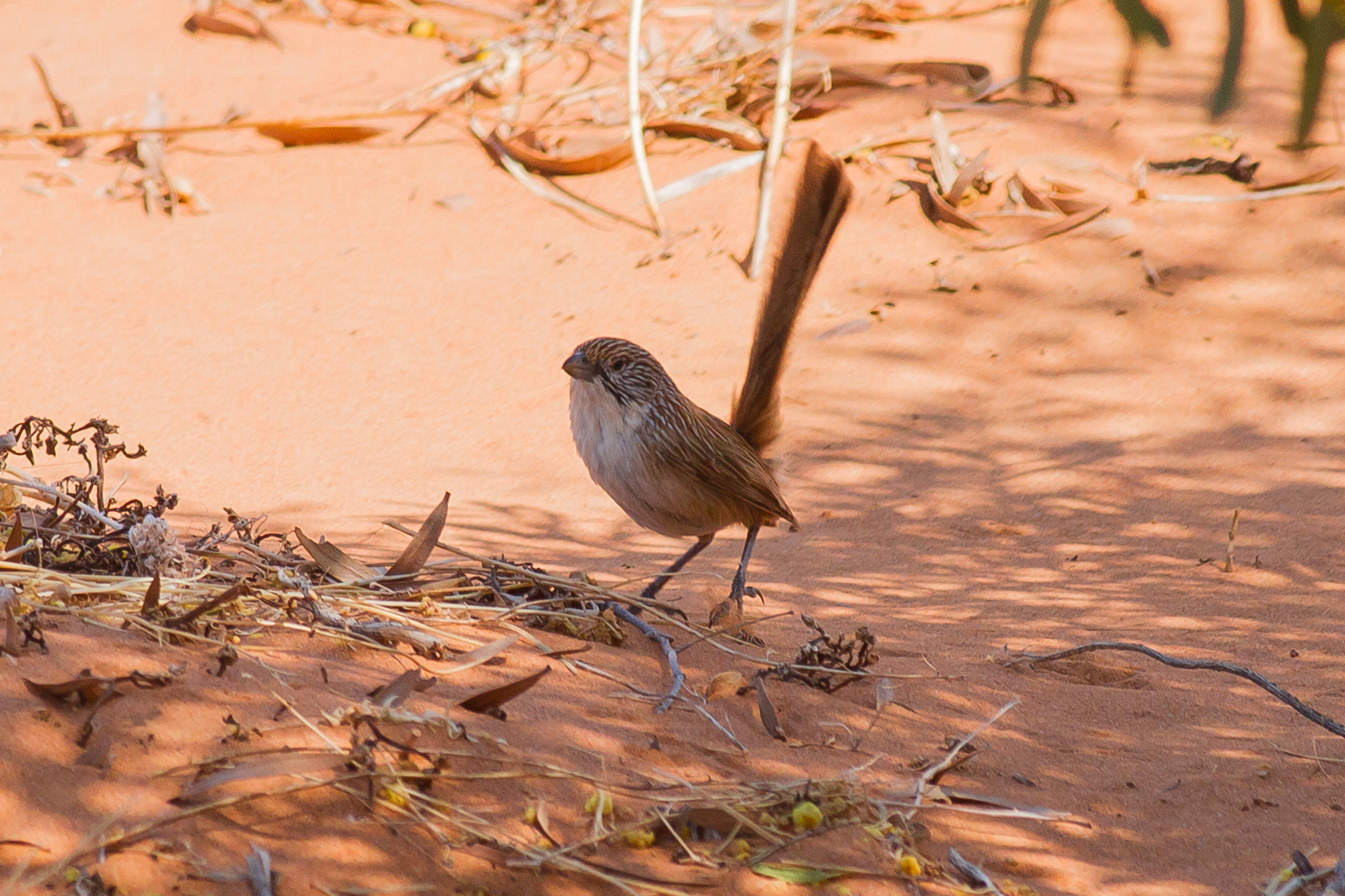

Conservation status
- Least Concern (IUCN 3.1)

Scientific classification
- Kingdom: Animalia
- Phylum: Chordata
- Class: Aves
- Order: Passeriformes
- Family: Maluridae
- Genus: Amytornis
- Species: A. goyderi

Binomial name
- Amytornis goyderi (Gould, 1875)
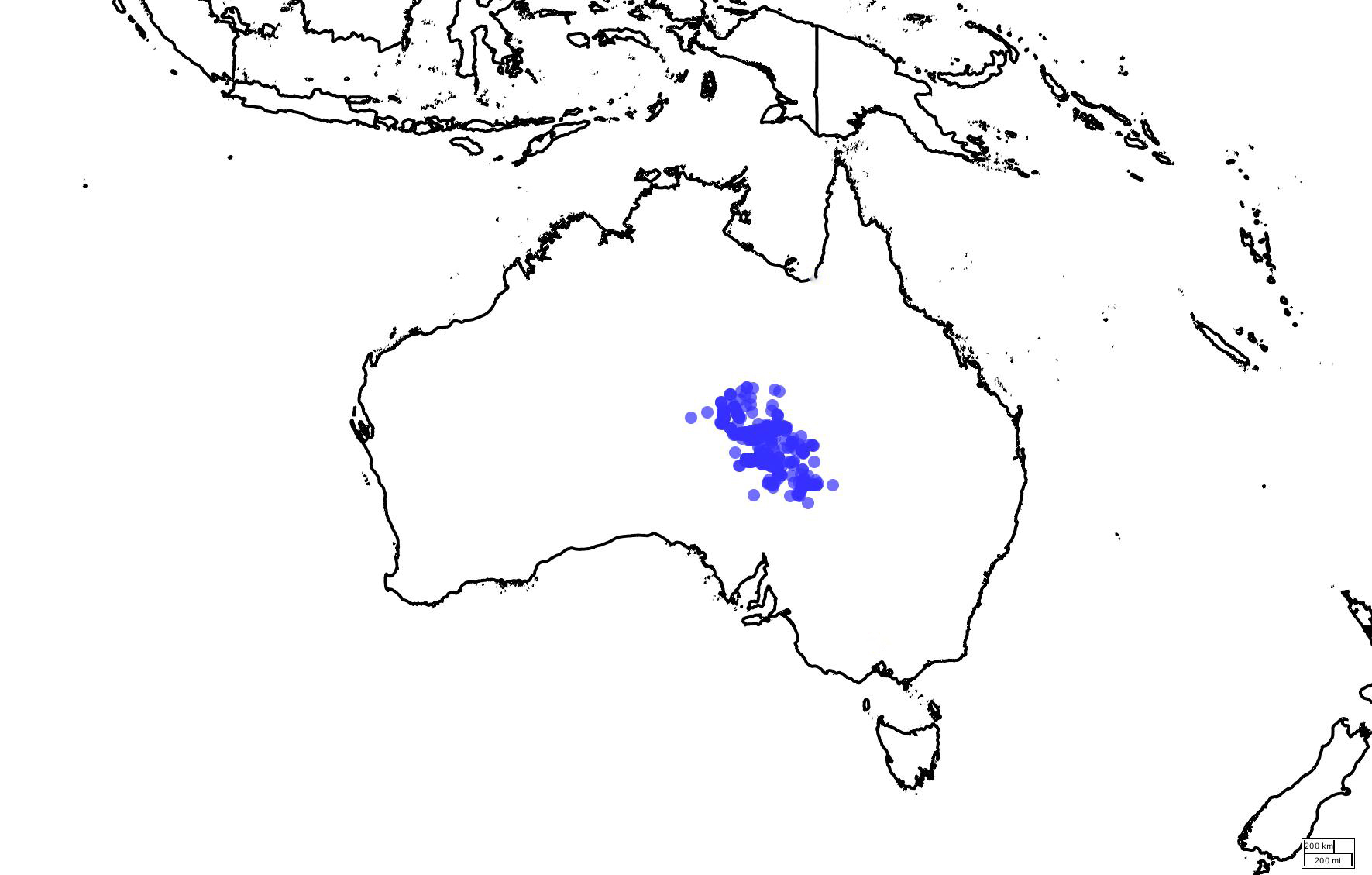
- Distribution of the Eyrean grasswren in Australia

Synonyms
- Goyder's grasswren (obsolete)

= Eyrean grasswren =

Species of bird

The Eyrean grasswren (Amytornis goyderi) is a small grasswren from the Passerine family Maluridae. This is a cryptically plumaged and uncommon bird endemic to arid regions of Central Australia. The species was discovered by F.W. Andrews in 1874 around the Macumba River at Lake Eyre, and named after the South Australian Surveyor General George Woodroffe Goyder.

== Description ==
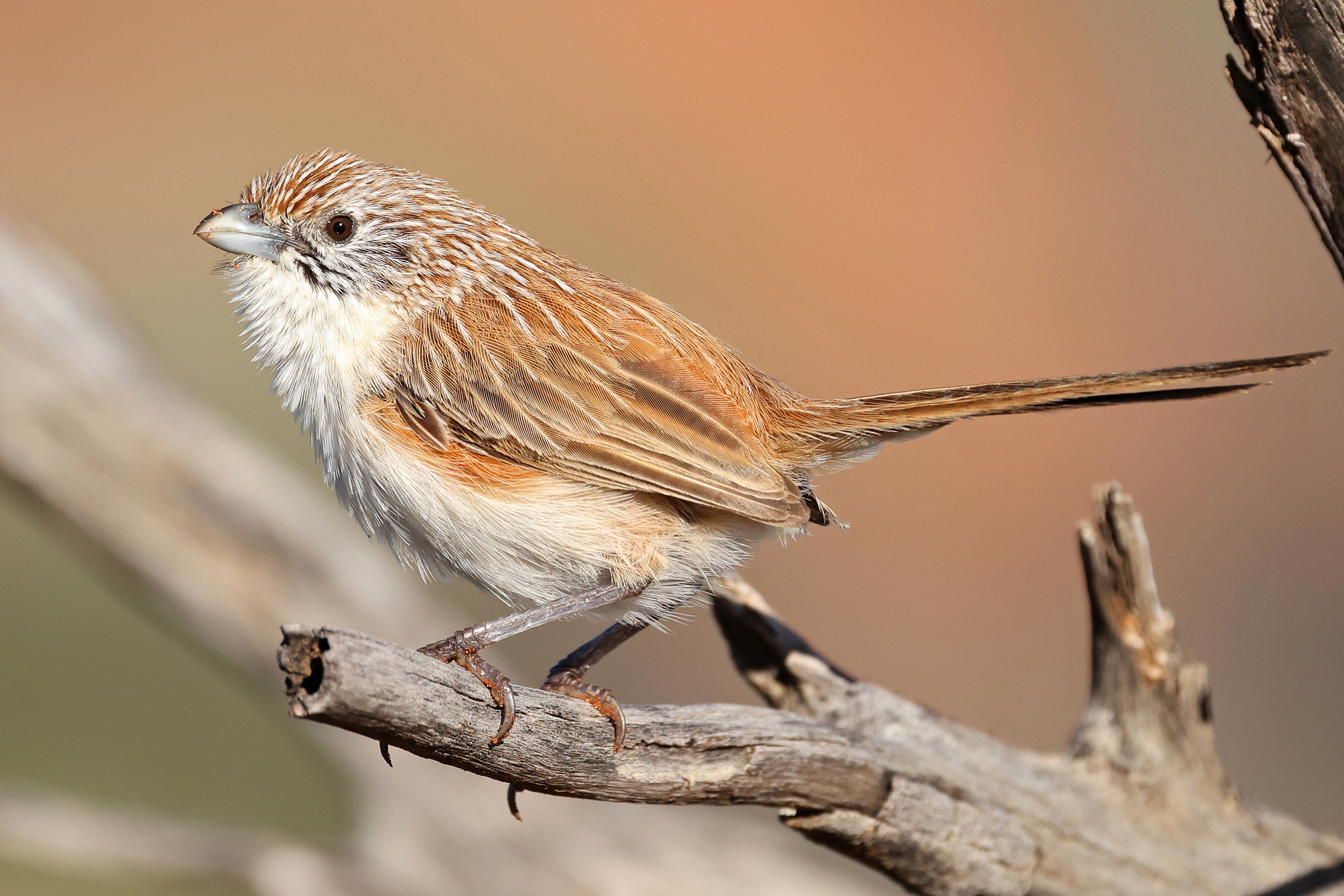
A female Eyrean grasswren.

At 14–16.5 cm in length, Amytornis goyderi is the smallest grasswren. It has a deep, finch-like bill. There are some minor differences between sexes, and between populations across the distribution.

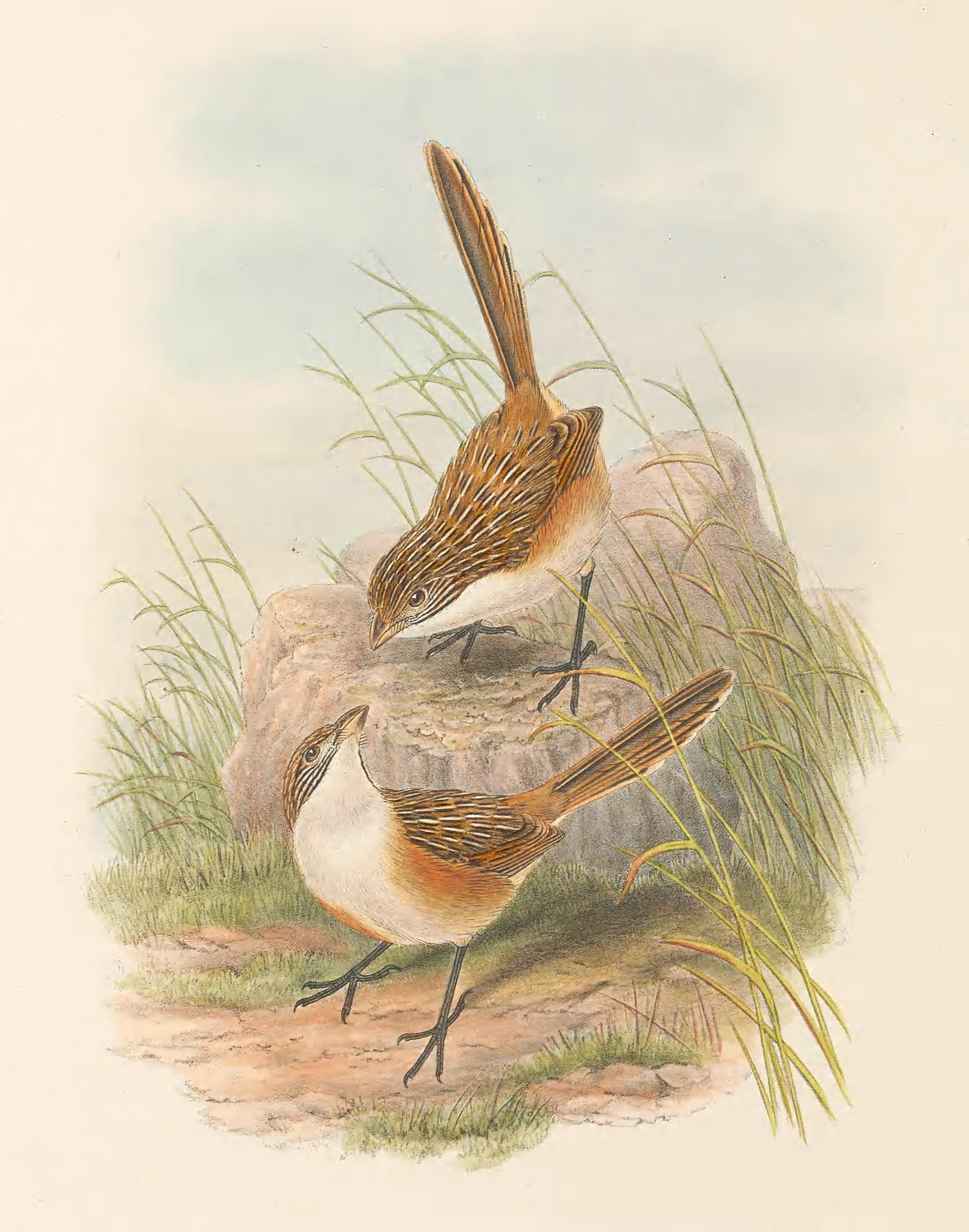
Illustration by John Gould and W. Hart

=== Adult male ===
The head is reddish with bold white streaks, neck and upper body dull to bright rufous-brown, streaked with fine dark and white lines. The face is mainly white except for the rufous forehead, white lores and a thin partial white eye-ring beneath the eye; and sometimes a rufous fore-supercilium. Black and white ear coverts separate the dark head parts from the off-white chin and throat. The tail is dark grey-brown with off-white shafts and light brown fringes. Upperwings are also dark grey-brown, but with prominent white shafts and narrow rufous-brown fringes to the secondary coverts and tertials; and fine light brown edges to the other remiges, producing rufous-brown patches when the wing is folded. The underbody is white with buff-brown wash on the flanks through to the legs and underside of tail. The bill is light grey to blue-grey with a darker grey culmen, and the iris is dark to olive-brown. The legs and feet are purplish to dark grey.

=== Female ===
Identical to males but the flanks are a brighter rufous-brown, and not as distinctly pale compared to the upperparts. The legs may be a slightly paler grey with stronger purplish tinge. Females are slightly smaller overall and have a finer bill.

=== Nestling, fledgling and juvenile ===
Nestlings are naked with dark grey down on the head and wings. The bare skin is mostly pink with dark blue-grey skin around the eyes. Newly fledged birds have lemon or yellow gape-flanges. Partial moult begins soon after fledging, producing similar patterns to adult male but upperparts are much duller and browner, with less distinct streaking and facial patterns. They are fluffier which can give a mottled appearance around the face and ear coverts. The eye is olive and the bill is light grey, lacking the dark culmen and brown tip seen in the adult male. In young birds the skull is not fully pneumatised.

== Systematics and taxonomy ==
The Eyrean grasswren was originally described by John Gould in 1875, who named it Amytis goyderi. Gould assumed it was related to the western grasswren (A. textilis) due to similarities in plumage characters. During the 20th century, various authors placed it in clades derived from either A. textilis or A. striatus, considering it closely related to either A. modestus or A. striatus. With the development of molecular studies, it was found that A. goyderi belongs in a clade with A. ballarae and A. purnelli which appears to have evolved from a common ancestor with A. textilis.

=== Evolutionary history ===
There are two possible explanations for grasswren diversity in Central Australia: Either they originated there, or they colonised it. The close relationships between A. goyderi and other central taxa indicate that they arose there in the last 100000 years as glaciation events influenced the vegetation structures in Central Australia. A. goyderi is one of very few avian species to evolve in a minor ecological refuge.

== Distribution ==
A. goyderi has a patchy, restricted distribution, found only in dune fields of the Simpson and Strzelecki deserts of Central Australia. These deserts are located in the Birdsville Structural Basin, an enormous drainage basin centring on Lake Eyre. Most populations are found in South Australia from north of Cameron Corner to Witjira National Park; with some in SW Queensland and the Northern Territory. It is likely that populations are plastic, being most abundant when canegrass is plentiful and withdrawing to refuges during drought.

== Habitat ==
The Eyrean grasswren habitat consists of sandhill canegrass (Zygochloa paradoxa) tussocks on large, loosely sanded dune crests and slopes; as well as in speargrass (Aristida holathera), spinifex (Triodia spp.) and dune pea (Swainsona rigida) where it grows among Z. paradoxa. Typical landscapes consist of tussocks ranging from 1–4m high and 2–3m in diameter, spaced well apart and with bare ground between them. The birds rarely stray from dune slopes; but are sometimes observed in swales.

== Behaviour ==
No extensive surveys of Eyrean grasswren behaviour have been undertaken, but it is thought to be sedentary. They are usually found in singles and pairs, or small groups of up to ten. It is cryptic, remaining hidden within Z. paradoxa tussocks, and is difficult to flush. Flight is rare, but when flushed the birds bound with wings half spread between tussock clumps or fly short distances of up to 10m with the tail trailing. They use a distinctive "half running, half flying" movement low to the ground, bounding and flying for short distances of 40–220 cm. Movements are quick and furtive with the tail usually held cocked. They sometimes perch low (c. 1 m) on grevillea branches, canegrass or other shrubs.

== Diet ==
Prey consists of about equal amounts of vegetation and invertebrates. Specimen stomach contents include seeds from grasses Z. paradoxa and Aristida holathera, as well as remnants of numerous invertebrate species. Individuals move with small hops while foraging between clumps of spinifex (Triodia spp.) and within clumps of dune pea (Swainsona rigida). It will sometimes skip backwards and shuffle the feet to uncover food items in the sand.

== Reproduction ==
Very little is known about the mating habits of A. goyderi. No information exists on laying or incubation durations. Nests containing nestlings and eggs have been located from July to September and dependent fledglings from May to September. Clutches are 2–3 broadly oval eggs with slight variations in shape. It is assumed to be monogamous and to breed throughout the range.

Females are responsible for nest construction, which takes about one week to complete. Nests are wedged into tussock stems close to the ground (usually <1m height) in clumps of Z. paradoxa and Australian boxthorn (Lychan austral). The nest consists of a truncated cup or dome of varying dimensions made from grasses such as A. holathera with Z. paradoxa strands woven in to the base, while an inner cup consists of finer grass and sometimes downy plant material or spider silk. Nests are well spaced but may be more densely aggregated in patches of good habitat.

== Vocalisations ==
Contact calls are made throughout the day, usually given as call and response. Adults of both sexes sing, which may function in territorial defence or maintaining group cohesion. Songs are performed from low perches or on the ground, and may increase in frequency during the breeding season. The songs are "distinctive", consisting of "beautiful silvery cadences, pip trills and long bursting staccatos" which may sometimes be meshed together in excited bursts. These may be heard up to 100m away, while the quieter contact calls can be heard from 30–40m. Alarm calls are high and sharp, and are louder than the contact call.

== Conservation ==
A. goyderi was listed by the IUCN as threatened in 1988, and as special concern by the Royal Australian Ornithologist's Union in 1992 as further research was required. The IUCN currently lists it as least concern since the species is not thought to be declining and probably fluctuates due to seasonal cycles.

Threats include any species or processes affecting the quality of sandhill canegrass habitat such as erosion driven by grazing rabbits, camels and livestock.

== Ornithological history ==
The first record of A. goyderi came from an expedition by J.W.Lewis into the arid northern regions of South Australia in 1874, resulting in the collection of six specimens obtained near the Macumba river on Lake Eyre. Two of these specimens were forwarded by the curator of the South Australian Museum F.W.Andrews, to John Gould who described them in 1875. These were later given to the British Museum of Natural History, however the remainder were lost. A third specimen was found in the Dobroyde collection housed at the Australian Museum in Sydney; although it is now thought that this is not one of the missing type specimens. No further specimens were obtained until a century after Lewis' expedition when two were acquired in Qld in 1976. A second expedition later that year resulted in 19 specimens, 3 nests and 2 eggs. Prior to then, numerous specimens were misidentified.

In the time since May's observations at Poeppel's Corner the species has been located many times. However, due to the cryptic nature of the species and the remoteness of its distribution very little research into the behavioural habits has been undertaken. Some attempts to trap the bird failed as they are so small, they were able to pass through mist nets.
