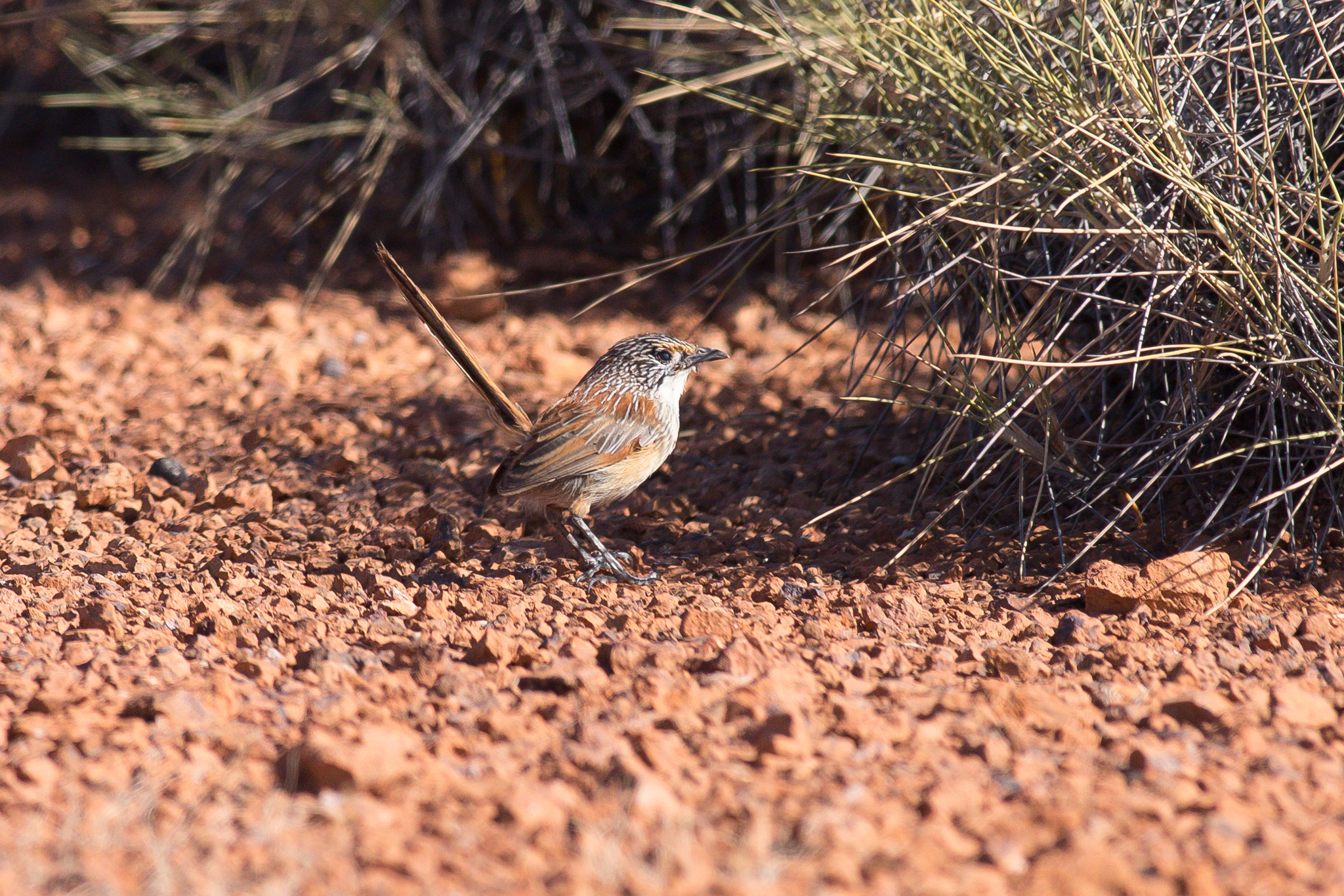

Scientific classification
- Kingdom: Animalia
- Phylum: Chordata
- Class: Aves
- Order: Passeriformes
- Family: Maluridae
- Genus: Amytornis
- Species: A. rowleyi

Binomial name
- Amytornis rowleyi Schodde & Mason, IJ, 1999
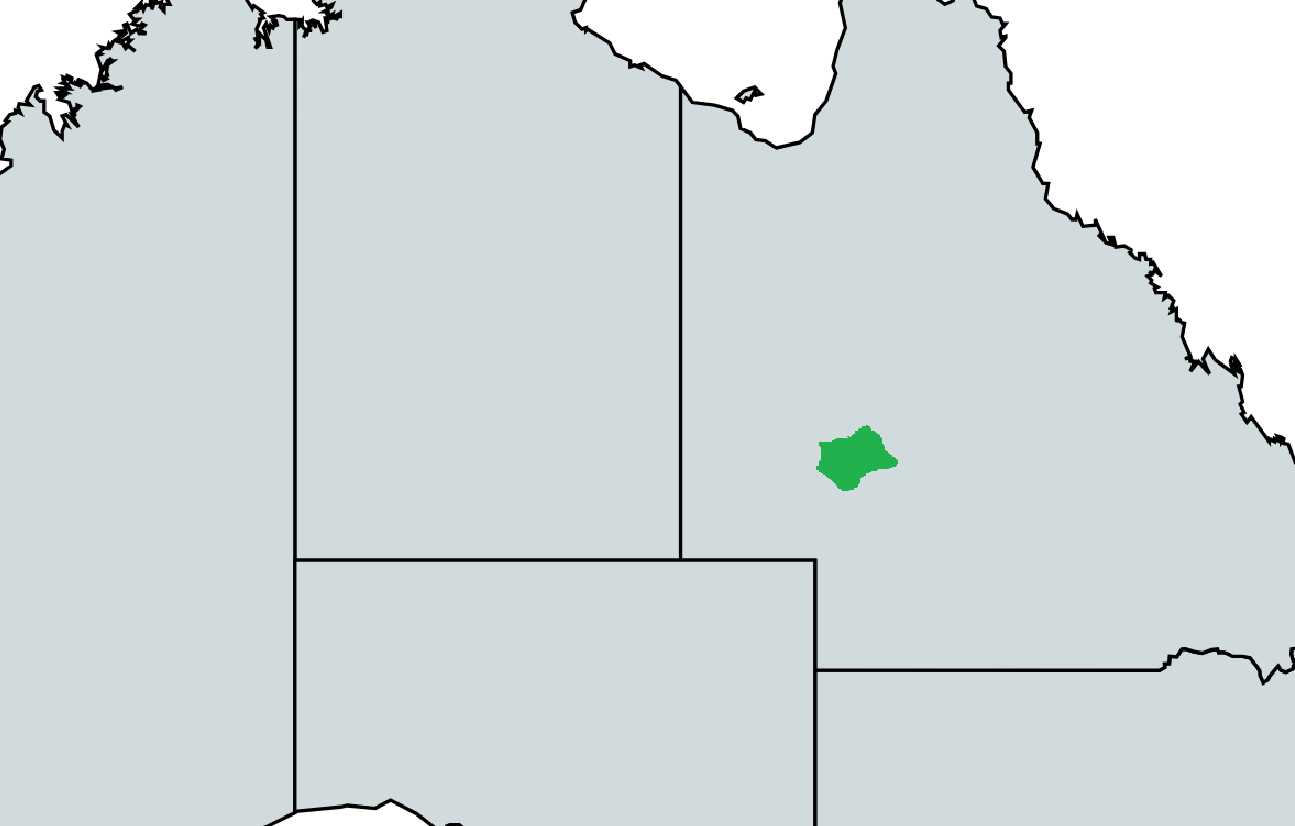
- Distribution

= Opalton grasswren =

Species of bird

The Opalton grasswren (Amytornis rowleyi) is an insectivorous bird in the family Maluridae. It is found in the Forsyth Range, Queensland, Australia. Formerly considered a sub-species of the striated grasswren (Amytornis striatus rowleyi), then known as the rusty grasswren. It is found around the opal mining area of Opalton and Lark Quarry south of Winton, Western Queensland. It was named as a full species by the I.O.C. in July 2020.

== Taxonomy and systematics ==
The Opalton grasswren was first described in 1999 as Artemis striatus rowleyi, a subspecies of the striated grasswren, based on specimens found near Opalton in 1970. In 2013, it was proposed that it be promoted to a full species based on genetic data collected from the striated grasswren species complex. In 2020, the International Ornithologists' Union officially listed the Opalton grasswren as its own species, with the binomial name Artemis rowleyi. The Opalton grasswren has no subspecies.

== Description ==
The Opalton grasswren is the only grasswren in its range. It is a small bird with a reddish-brown back marked with black and white striations. It has white underparts and a black moustache. It is somewhat visually similar to the sandhill grasswren and striated grasswren.

== Conservation and status ==
The Opalton grasswren has not been official assessed by the International Union for Conservation of Nature, although it is not believed to be at risk. Some potential threats include habitat loss, introduced predators such as cats, and climate change, particularly in the form of wildfires.
