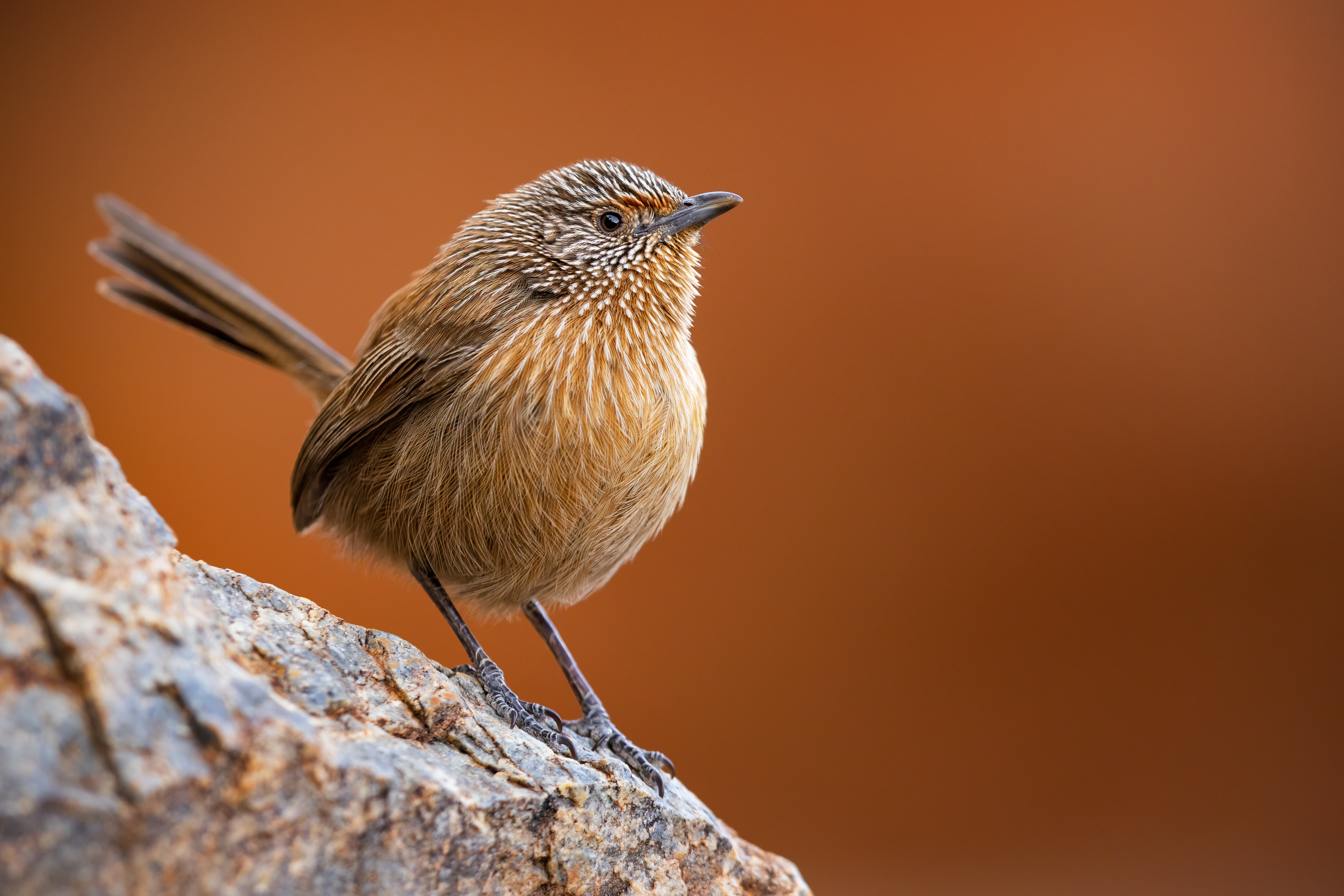

Conservation status
- Least Concern (IUCN 3.1)

Scientific classification
- Kingdom: Animalia
- Phylum: Chordata
- Class: Aves
- Order: Passeriformes
- Family: Maluridae
- Genus: Amytornis
- Species: A. purnelli

Binomial name
- Amytornis purnelli (Mathews, 1914)

Synonyms
- Diaphorillas textilis purnelli (protonym)

= Dusky grasswren =

Species of bird

The dusky grasswren (Amytornis purnelli) is a species of small passerine bird in the family Maluridae. The species is endemic to Australia but is limited to inland areas of the Northern Territory, Western Australia and South Australia.

== Description ==
The dusky grasswren is superficially similar in appearance to a number of the other grasswrens in the genus Amytornis, but is the only member of this genus to exclusively inhabit rocky ranges across Central Australia. It has a predominantly brown base colour to its plumage with fine pale streaking over the head breast and mantle. The brown of the plumage is a richer chestnut on the back and pale to almost buff on the belly and vent. The most obvious difference between sexes is the bright rusty-brown spot on the fore-flanks of the adult female and all birds exhibit the characteristic cocked tail posture common to all malurids.

=== Field identification ===
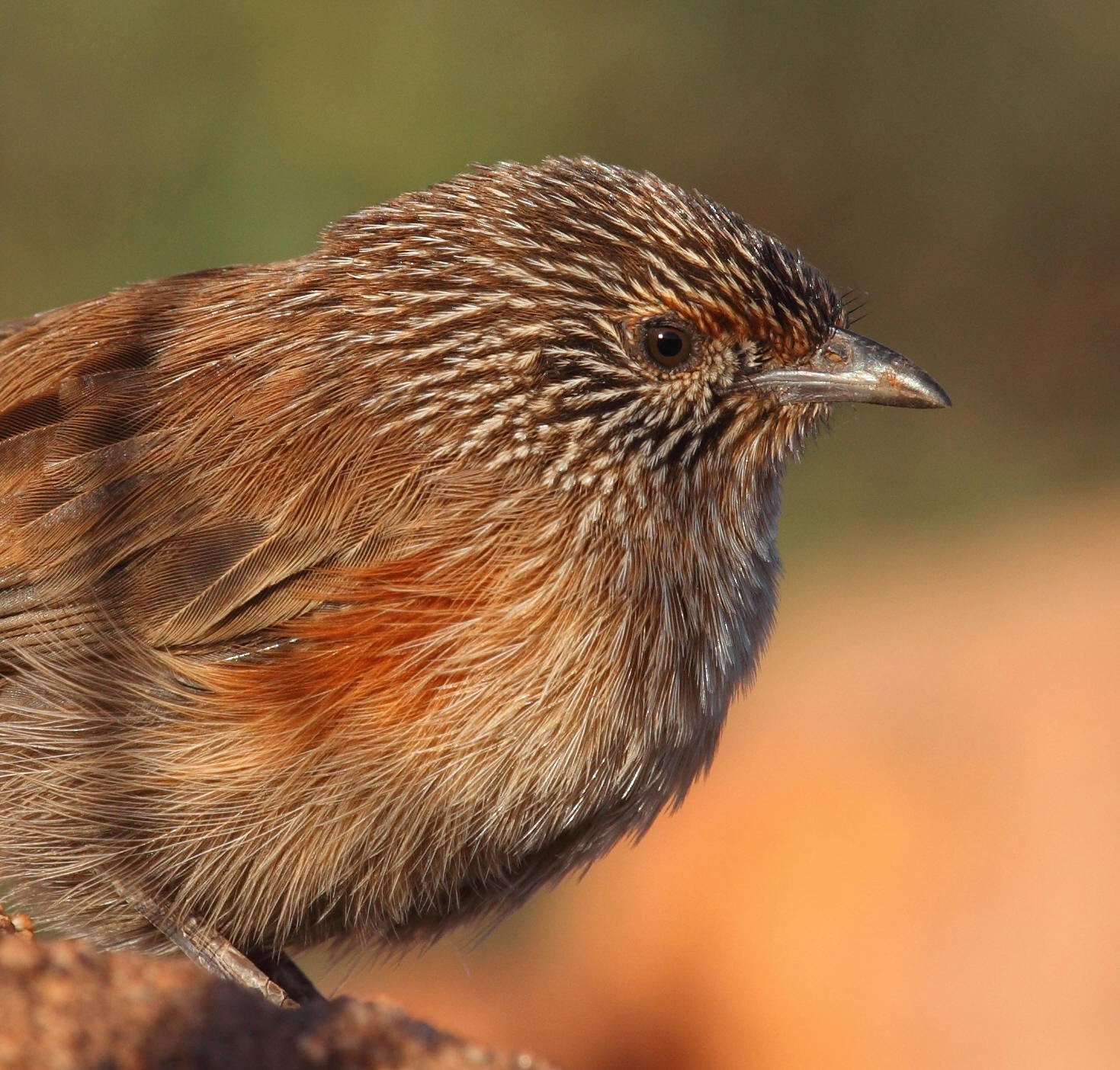
Amytornis purnelli, female, close-up

The species is easily identified within its core range by its distinctive vocalisations (see further information below). The mouse-like, strongly terrestrial, habits of the species can make it difficult to observe clearly within its preferred habitat of boulder-strewn rocky hillsides covered with spinifex grasses. But when observed well, the cocked tail, overall brown colouration and strongly terrestrial habits should be sufficient to achieve a positive identification.

=== Similar species ===
The dusky grasswren is similar in shape and form to most of the other species in Amytornis, but is relatively unmistakable if seen well in the field. It probably doesn't overlap in its use of habitat with any other species of grasswren and also differs in its vocalisations. The species most likely to cause confusion are the Kalkadoon grasswren (Amytornis ballarae), with which it was considered conspecific until 1999, and the thick-billed grasswren (Amytornis modestus). The former only occurs well to the north-east of the currently-known distribution of dusky grasswren; the latter is considered extinct in the Northern Territory and only occurs to the south and east of the known distribution of dusky grasswren in South Australia.

Dusky grasswren might also be confused with striated grasswren (A. striatus) but is not currently-known to occur in the sand plain and dunefield habitat of this species. Striated grasswren is also so boldly marked by comparison to dusky grasswren that it should be unlikely to cause any confusion in the field. Fairywrens within family Maluridae overlap with dusky grasswren in both their distribution and use of habitat including: splendid fairywren (Malurus splendens); purple-backed fairywren (M. assimilis); and white-winged fairywren (M. leucopterus).

Although these species may display a superficial resemblance to the dusky grasswren in their contact calls, their posture and manner of moving, and their general size and shape, if properly seen and heard in full song they are easy to separate. The fairywren species are all a uniform grey colour (except for breeding males which will sport brightly-coloured alternate plumage) with varying amounts of blue visible on adult's tails.

=== Vocalisations ===
This species most often reveals itself initially with a sharp, metallic tutting in alarm or a drawn-out seeeep contact call. The vocal repertoire of the dusky grasswren is varied and includes trills, high-pitched whistles, rapid twittering, and high-speed warbling. Much of the richness in the calls is difficult for humans to detect due to the extreme speed with which they are performed. When recordings are slowed however, the extensive lexicon used by the species becomes more obvious.

A dusky grasswren (Amytornis purnelli) from the Tennant Creek, NT population singing

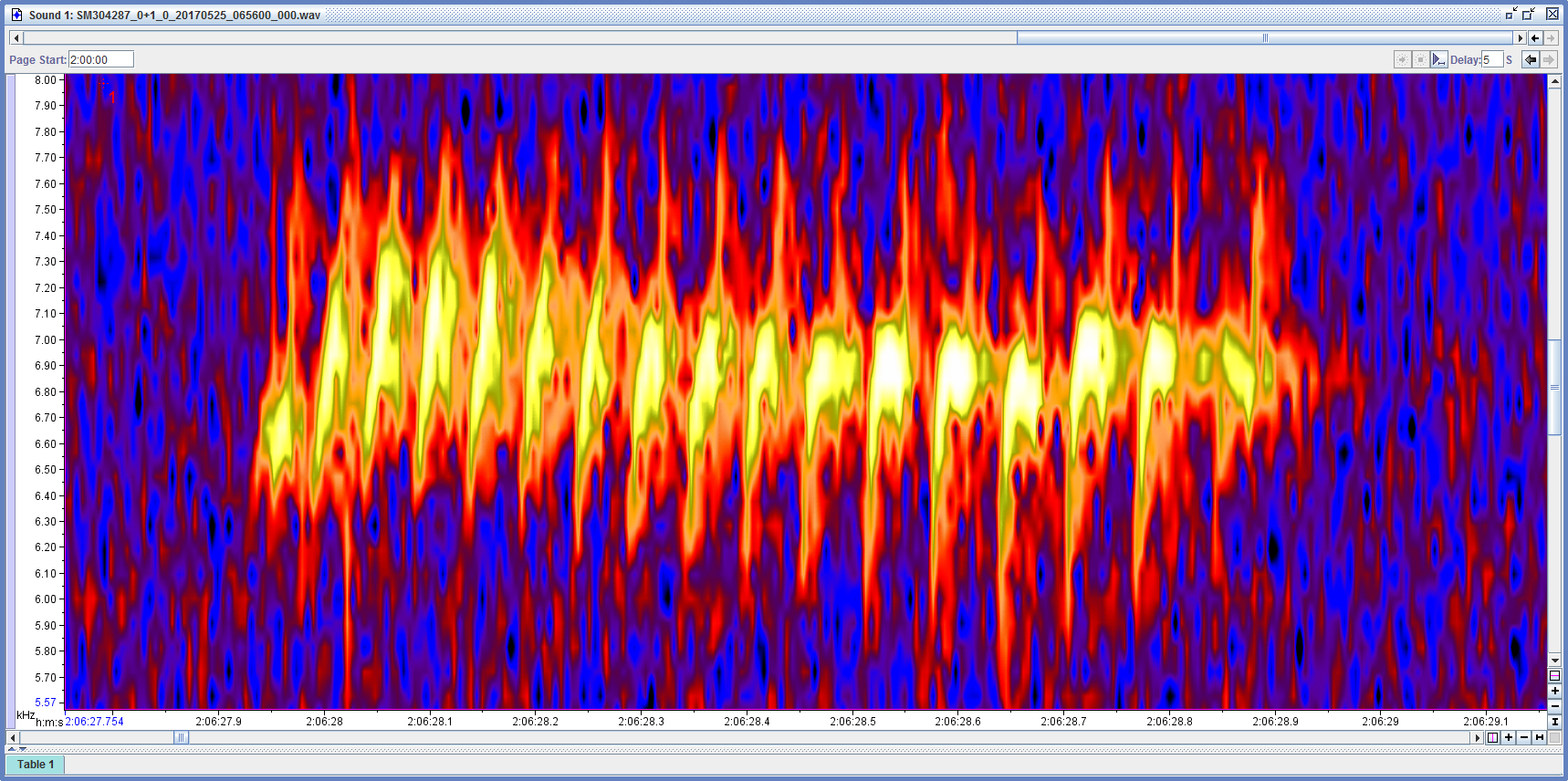
A spectrogram of the trill call of a dusky grasswren

=== Geographic variations ===
Some geographic variations have been noted but further research is required before a determination can be made as to whether these variations are sufficient to warrant taxonomic recognition. There are vocal differences (more stentorian and staccato in the north of their range) as well as plumage differences (birds are observed to be paler in the north of their range and richer rufous-brown in the south).

== Ecology ==
=== Habitat ===
Across their entire range, dusky grasswrens adhere to the same habitat type: rocky ranges and outcrops, often preferring tumbled talus or scree, and with areas of thick, long-unburnt spinifex grasses in the genus Triodia. They are not known to use sandplain habitat adjacent to rocky areas which may be one factor giving rise to the patchiness of their occurrence across Central Australia.

=== Diet ===
In the wild dusky grasswrens have been observed feeding on a range of small arthropods and other invertebrates; seeds; and small desert fruits but there are few published accounts of wild feeding observations. In captivity the species has been observed to subsist on a typical aviary feed-out of meat mix, greens and vegetables enriched with a variety of live invertebrate prey including cockroaches and mealworms.

=== In captivity ===
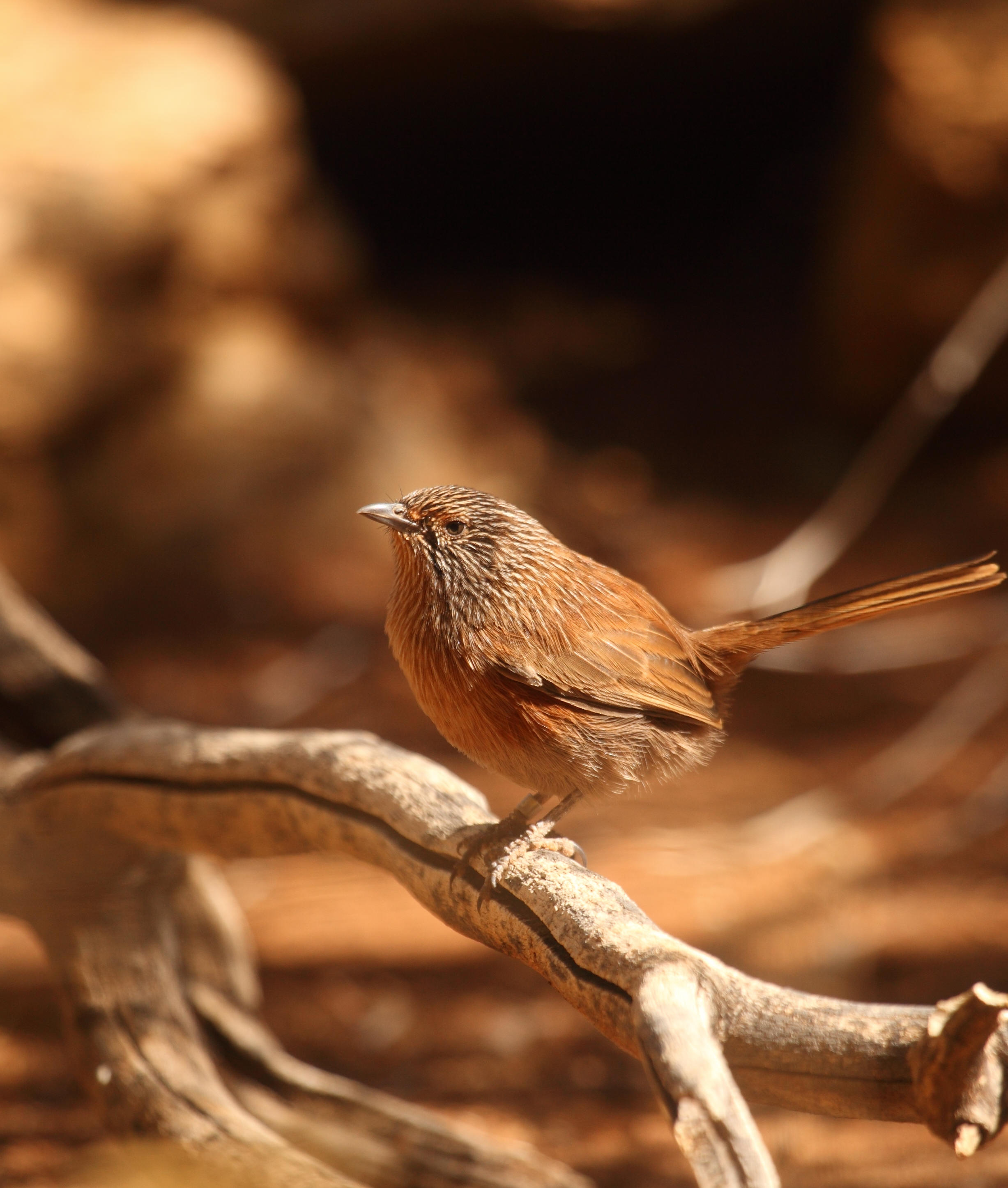
An adult female dusky grasswren at Alice Springs Desert Park with metal leg band visible

The species has been successfully kept in captivity at Alice Springs Desert Park since 2009 where it has also been successfully bred and released back into the wild.

== Taxonomy ==
The species was considered polytypic until 1999 when the subspecies A. purnelli ballarae was elevated to species as Kalkadoon grasswren (A. ballarae) by Schodde & Mason in the Directory of Australian Birds. This leaves dusky grasswren as a monotypic species occupying a vast but disjunct range. In this same publication however, Schodde & Mason also observed that the dusky grasswren is "probably polytypic".

== Distribution ==
The majority of the range of the dusky grasswren is very remote terrain with little or no regular human visitation. As such, its distribution is very poorly known and although its range covers a large area on the map, it may occupy this region very patchily and be absent from much of it. The northernmost records of the species come from the Ashburton Range near Banka Banka in the Northern Territory; the most southerly are in the Musgrave, Mann and Tomkinson Ranges of South Australia. They have been observed as far west as the Schwern-Mural Crescent near Giles in Western Australia and as far east as the Davenport and Murchison Ranges in the Northern Territory. Within this region there are very large areas of unsuitable habitat separating populations.

== Status and conservation ==
None of the IUCN criteria for threat classification are triggered by the dusky grasswren, mainly due to its very large range. Although detailed population and distributional data are lacking, it is assumed to have a stable population across a wide distribution and, as such, is not considered vulnerable to becoming an endangered species.

=== Threats ===
There are no published accounts of dusky grasswren being preyed upon by introduced predators but it is likely that they are eaten by cats and foxes. Other species within Amytornis have been found in the stomach contents of feral cats. Likewise there are no published data on the impacts of fire on this species but there are abundant anecdotal accounts suggesting that it may take decades for birds to return to habitat once it has been burnt. If this is the case, then changing fire management practices and changes to natural fuel loads caused by the encroachment of invasive weeds may need to be considered as possible threatening processes.

== Human interaction ==
Due to their cryptic nature and perhaps the allure of their remote homelands, all of the grasswrens in the genus Amytornis have attracted devotees among ornithologists and birdwatchers from around the world. Most grasswrens are notoriously difficult to find and, even once found, they can be frustratingly difficult to observe. In addition to being the only species on display in captivity, the dusky grasswren has a reputation as being one of the easier grasswrens to see in the wild. It occurs in healthy numbers in the MacDonnell Range close to the major outback town of Alice Springs in the Northern Territory and has been regularly recorded and well-photographed in this vicinity.

=== Indigenous knowledge ===
Due to its large range, the dusky grasswren occurs in the traditional lands of dozens of Indigenous peoples of central Australia. It is not known to be referred to by a specific epithet in any of the languages of central Australia but may be called by a number of names which are broadly applied to a number of small bird species. The species may be referred to as mirilyirilyi in Pitjantjatjara/Yankunytjatjara; jiwilyirrilyirri in Warlpiri; and lyerr-lyerr in Anmatyerre and Arrernte but these are all names which are also used for species of Fairywren within the genus Malurus. The only published Indigenous epithets that may apply specifically to either dusky grasswren or striated grasswren are antyarlkarleny from Alyawarre; ntyalkarlenye from Kaytetye; and tjinytjirlirlin(pa) from Ngaanyatjarra/Ngaatjatjarra.
