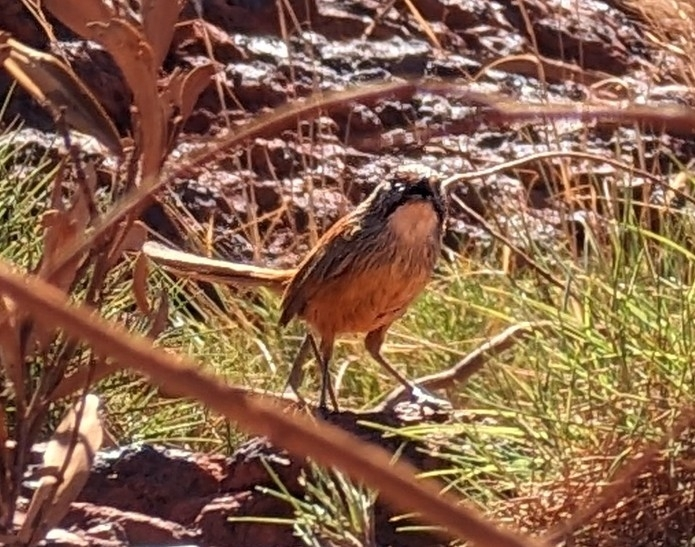

Conservation status
- Not evaluated (IUCN 3.1)

Scientific classification
- Kingdom: Animalia
- Phylum: Chordata
- Class: Aves
- Order: Passeriformes
- Family: Maluridae
- Genus: Amytornis
- Species: A. whitei

Binomial name
- Amytornis whitei Mathews, 1910
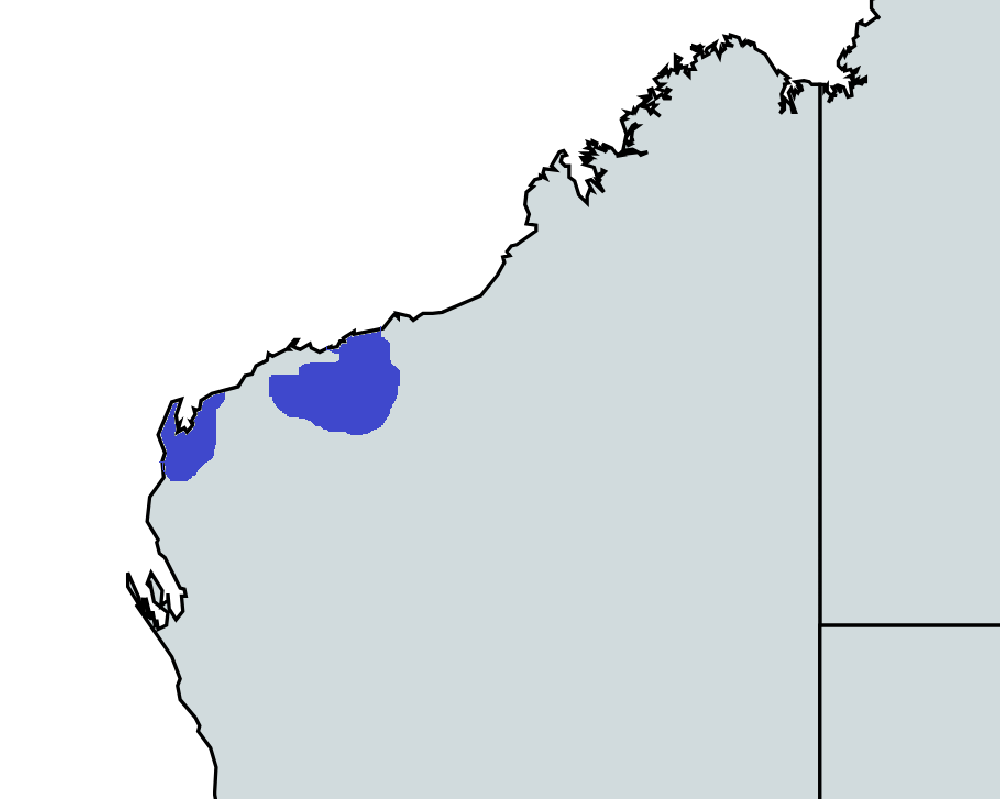
- Distribution

= Pilbara grasswren =

Species of bird

The Pilbara grasswren (Amytornis whitei), also known as the rufous grasswren, is an insectivorous bird in the Australasian wren family Maluridae. It is found in Western Australia. It was formerly considered to be conspecific with the sandhill grasswren.

Two subspecies are recognised:

- A. w. parvus Black, 2020 – Cape Range, far west Western Australia
- A. w. whitei Mathews, 1910 – Pilbara Ranges, west Western Australia
