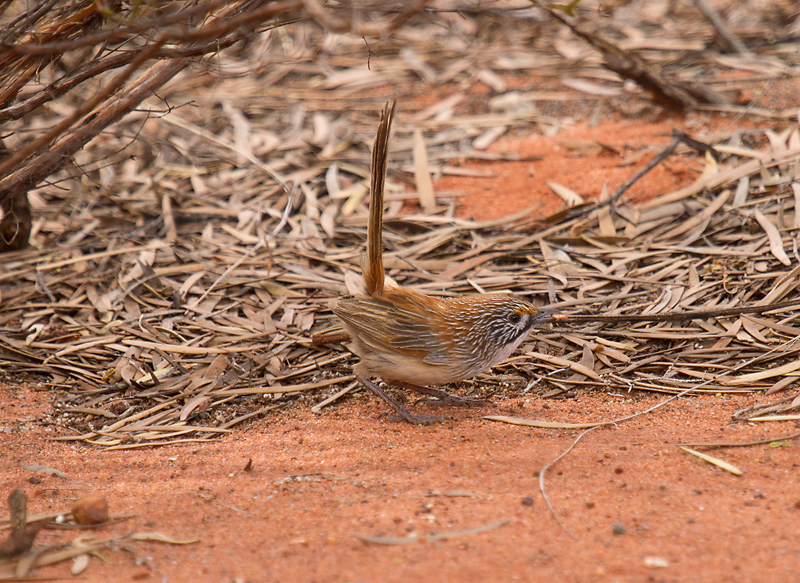

Conservation status
- Not evaluated (IUCN 3.1)

Scientific classification
- Kingdom: Animalia
- Phylum: Chordata
- Class: Aves
- Order: Passeriformes
- Family: Maluridae
- Genus: Amytornis
- Species: A. oweni

Binomial name
- Amytornis oweni Mathews, 1911
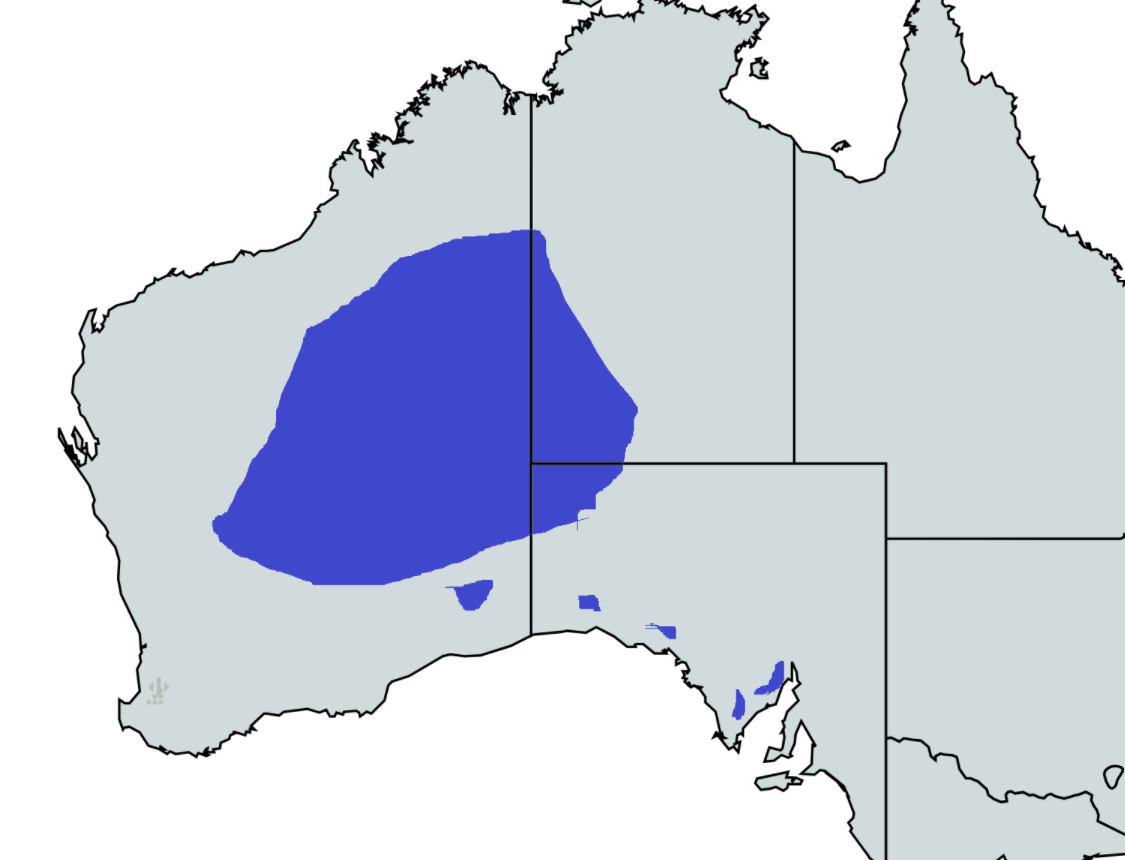
- Distribution

= Sandhill grasswren =

Species of bird

The sandhill grasswren (Amytornis oweni) is an insectivorous bird in the Australasian wren family Maluridae. It is found in sandplain deserts and mallee of central Western Australia to central Queensland as well as northwest and southern South Australia. It was formerly considered to be conspecific with the Pilbara grasswren.

== Taxonomy ==
The sandhill grasswren was formally described in 1911 by the Australian born ornithologist Gregory Mathews based on a specimen collected in East Murchison of Western Australia. He considered his specimen to represent a subspecies of the striated grasswren and coined the trinomial name Amytornis striatus oweni. He chose the specific epithet to honour his son-in-law Colonel Richard Owen Wynne. The sandhill grasswren was formerly considered to be conspecific with the rufous grasswren (Amytornis whitei)(since renamed the Pilbara grasswren). It is now treated as a separate species based on differences in morphology and ecology.

Two subspecies are recognised:

- A. o. oweni Mathews, 1911 – sandplain deserts of central Western Australia to central Queensland and northwest South Australia
- A. o. aenigma Black, 2020 – mallee sand plain of west Eyre Peninsula, south South Australia
