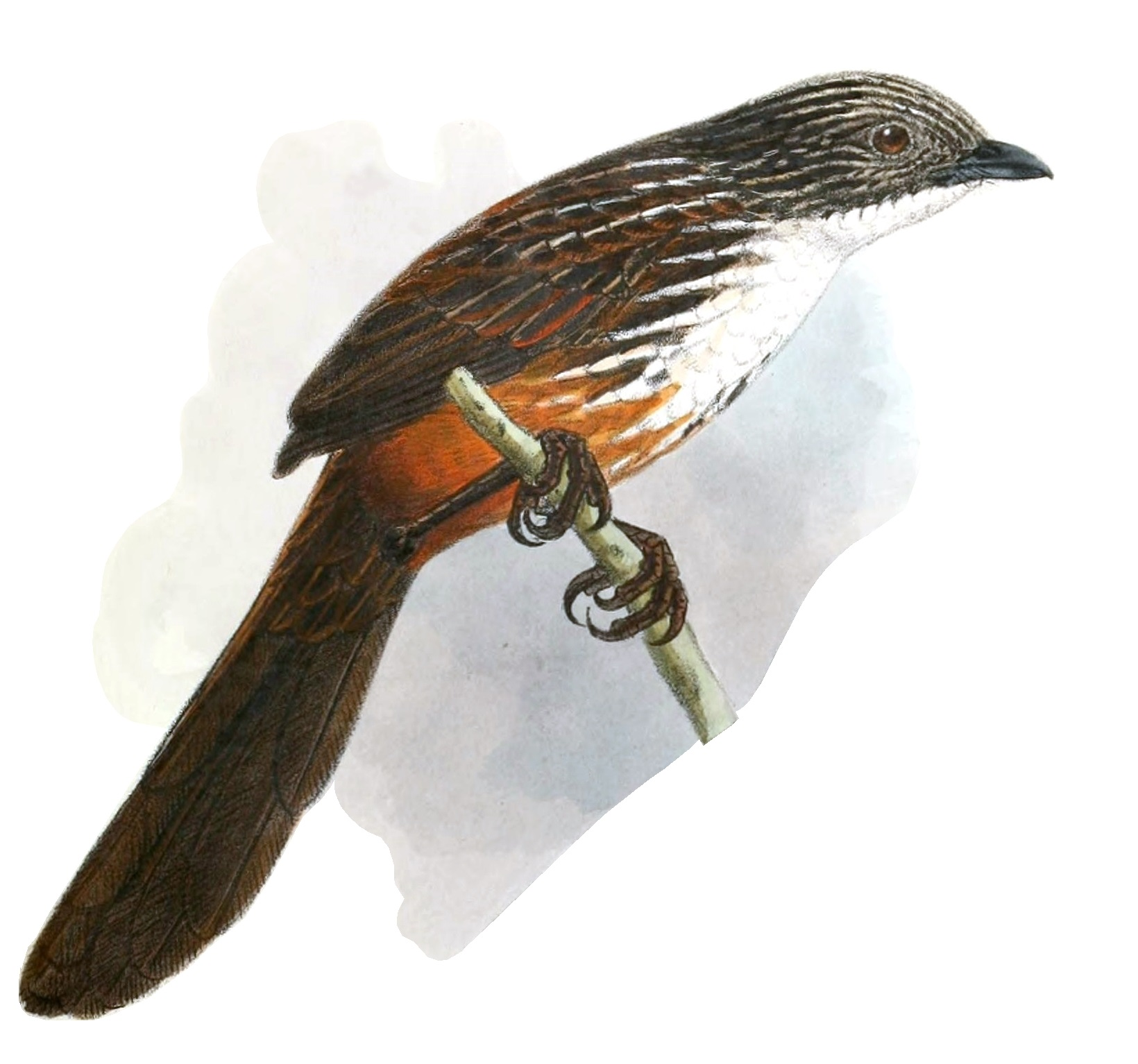

Conservation status
- Endangered (IUCN 3.1)

Scientific classification
- Kingdom: Animalia
- Phylum: Chordata
- Class: Aves
- Order: Passeriformes
- Family: Maluridae
- Genus: Amytornis
- Species: A. woodwardi

Binomial name
- Amytornis woodwardi Hartert, 1905
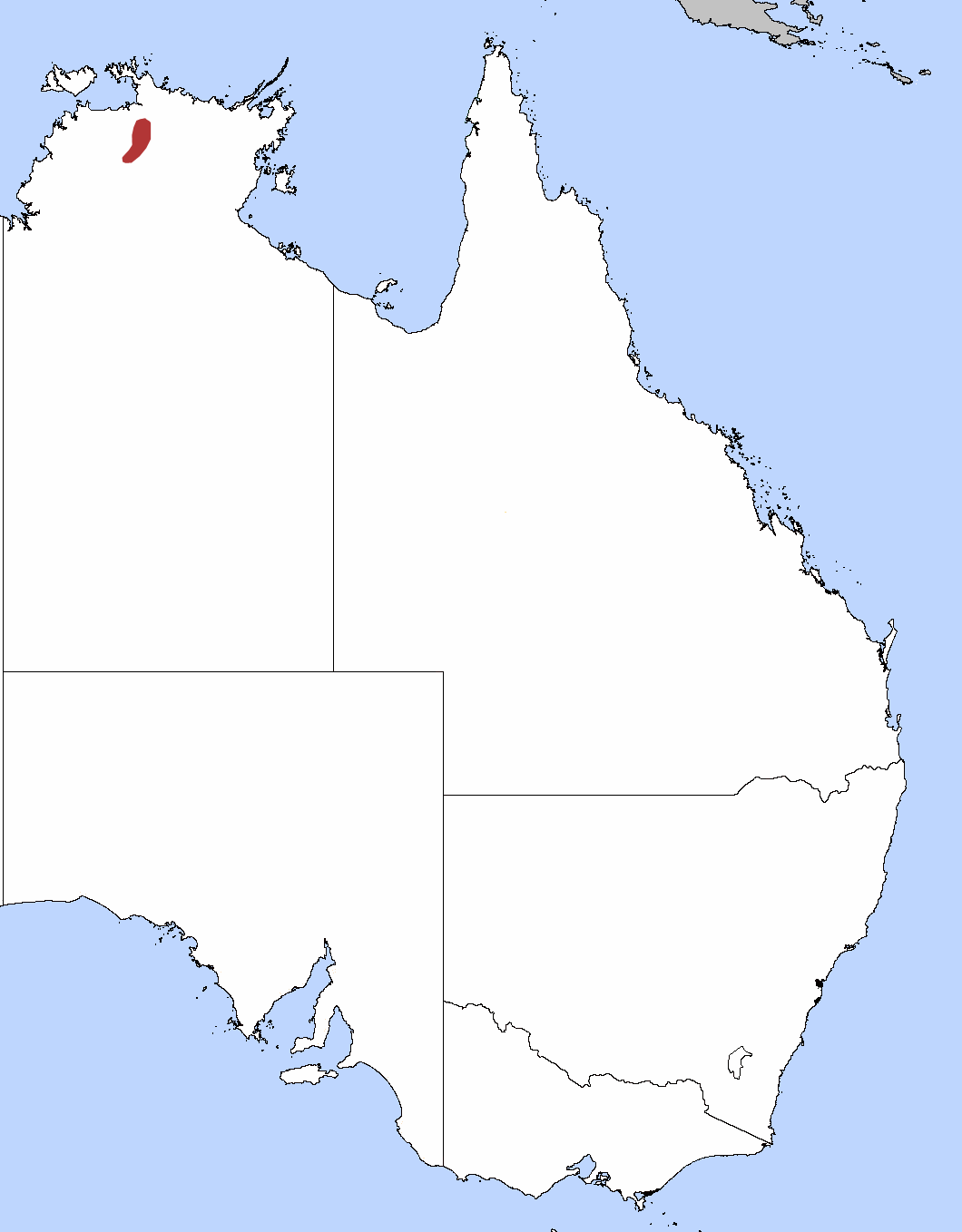
- Distribution of the white-throated grasswren

= White-throated grasswren =

Species of bird

The white-throated grasswren (Amytornis woodwardi), also known as Yirlinkirrkirr in the local language, is a species of bird in the family Maluridae. It is endemic to northern Australia, found only in West Arnhem Land, in the Northern Territory (NT).

== Description ==
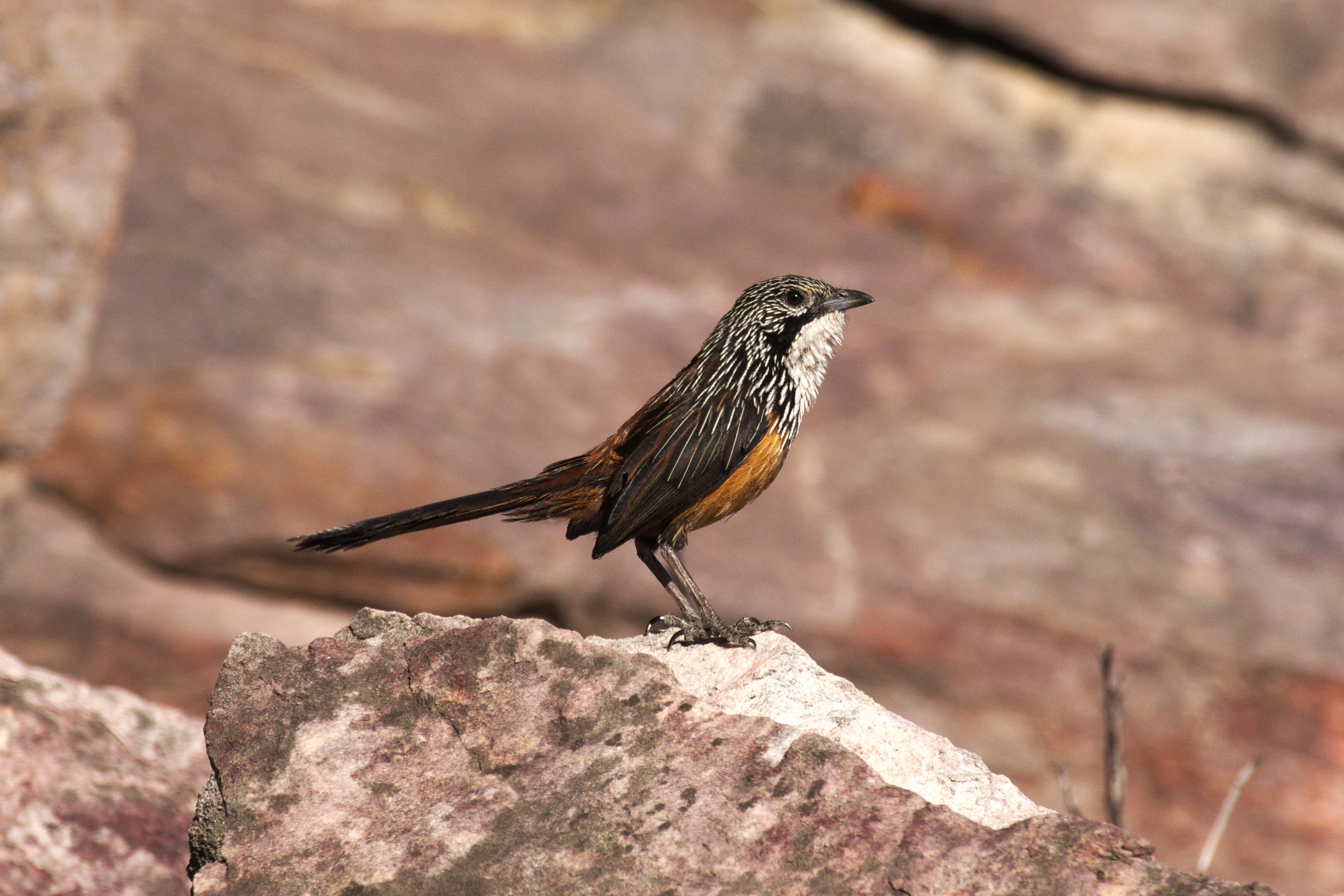
Adult male white-throated grasswren in Kakadu National Park, Australia

The white-throated grasswren is the largest member of the Australian grasswrens (Amytornis spp.), with a wing length of 70–80 mm. It has a similar pattern of coloration to the smaller Carpentarian grasswren (A. dorytheae), which occurs on sandstones hundreds of kilometers to the east of the Arnhem Plateau. White-throated grasswrens have a typically dark plumage with a striking white 'bib' from below the chin to the middle of the belly. Females tend to have dark reddish brown flanks and lower belly, whereas males have lighter rufous brown belly and flanks. White-throated grasswrens have soft, high-pitched contact calls that sound very similar to the co-occurring purple-backed (lavender-flanked) fairywren (Malurus assimilis dulcis), but also produce a complex song of trills and warbles.

== Habitat ==
The white-throated grasswren is only found on and around the Arnhem Land sandstone massif, between Katherine and Maningrida; representing an area of 6,200 km^{2} (2,400 sq mi). Like most grasswren species, the white-throated grasswren nests in large clumps of sharply pointed spinifex grass, which provides protection from predators.

Its natural habitats are sandstone and conglomerate escarpment of the Arnhem Plateau. Ecological niche modelling has shown that white-throated grasswrens typically occupy habitat patches that are close to unburnt habitat, have a low proportion-of-area-burnt, have low vegetation cover, and high time-since-fire, particularly when compared to the average background values across the landscape.

Using rough high and low thresholds of ecological niche modelling suitability scores, researchers predict that there is currently somewhere between 536 km^{2} and 2631 km^{2} of suitable habitat for the species. This is substantially less than previous estimates for the species.

Local knowledge by Bininj Nawarddeken people has identified sightings of the white-throated grasswren near outstations in the Warddeken Indigenous Protected Area, including Manmoyi, Kamarrkawarn, and Kabulwarnmyo in place where 'karri kore kanjdjikandji, ankebkakebkali', translating to 'the river by the edge of the rocks where they meet the savanna'.

== Conservation status ==
Its status is endangered on the IUCN Red List, last assessed in 2022, and in Australia under the federal Environment Protection and Biodiversity Conservation Act 1999, effective November 2014, and in the NT under the Territory Parks and Wildlife Conservation Act 2000.

It is threatened by habitat loss, as it depends on Triodia microstachya (spinifex grass) untouched by fire for at least five years. It is therefore threatened by more frequent bushfires (over 50 in 2021, with climate change playing a role in the increase), leading to inadequate habitat quality and lack of reproductive success. As the bird hops around rather than flies, it is vulnerable to predation by feral cats.

Its total population was estimated at between 5,000 and 10,000 individuals in 1992; no more than 10,000 mature birds in 2011, with numbers continuing to decline through loss of habitat. As of 2022 it has disappeared from many of the locations where it used to be spotted frequently, such as near Gunlom Falls in Kakadu National Park, Plum Tree Creek, the large population near the East Alligator River.

As the species is likely to be a poor disperser, populations are not likely to naturally recolonise areas where habitat has previously been unsuitable and has been made suitable in recent years. Without active management of fire regimes, habitat quality, and deliberate translocations, it may take long periods of time for areas of high habitat quality to be naturally colonised from remnant populations elsewhere in the landscape.

=== Conservation strategies ===
The white-throated grasswren is one of 20 species targeted in the Australian Government's 20 birds by 2020 document, produced as part of its Threatened Species Strategy in 2015.

As of 2022 Wardekken Indigenous rangers have been working on a project to help conserve the species with non-profit organisation Territory Natural Resource Management, funded by the federal government. One of the strategies used is Indigenous "patchwork" burning methods, which reduces the fuel load that helps to drive bushfires. They managed to spot some in June 2022, by using pre-recorded bird calls to attract the birds.

== Taxonomy ==
The species was identified by Ernst Hartert in 1905. It is in the family Maluridae.

== Cultural importance ==
The bird, known as Yirlinkirrkirr in the local Bininj Kunwok language, is of cultural significance to the Nawarddeken people.
