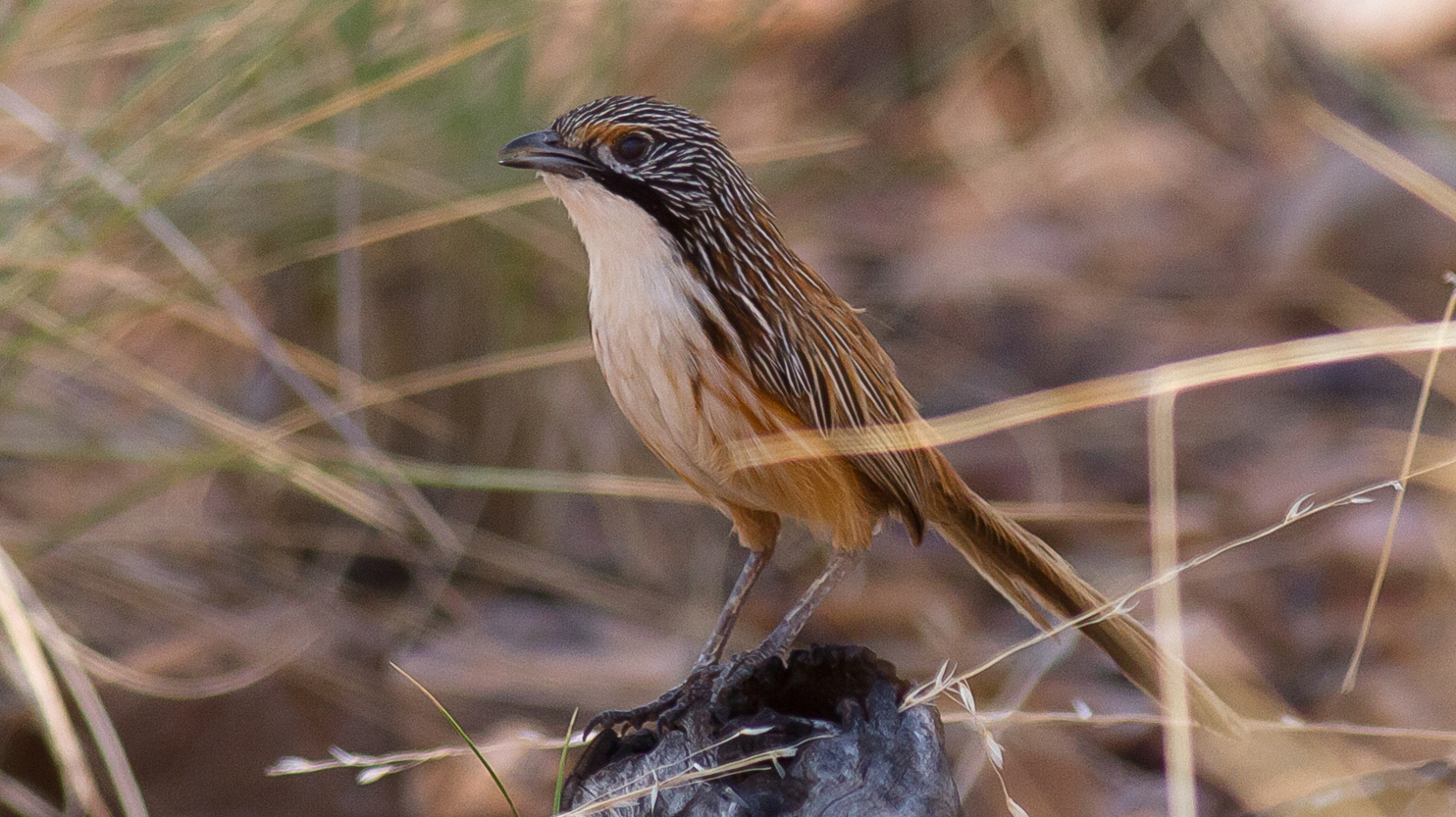
- in Mount Isa, Queensland, Australia

Conservation status
- Vulnerable (IUCN 3.1)

Scientific classification
- Kingdom: Animalia
- Phylum: Chordata
- Class: Aves
- Order: Passeriformes
- Family: Maluridae
- Genus: Amytornis
- Species: A. dorotheae

Binomial name
- Amytornis dorotheae (Mathews, 1914)
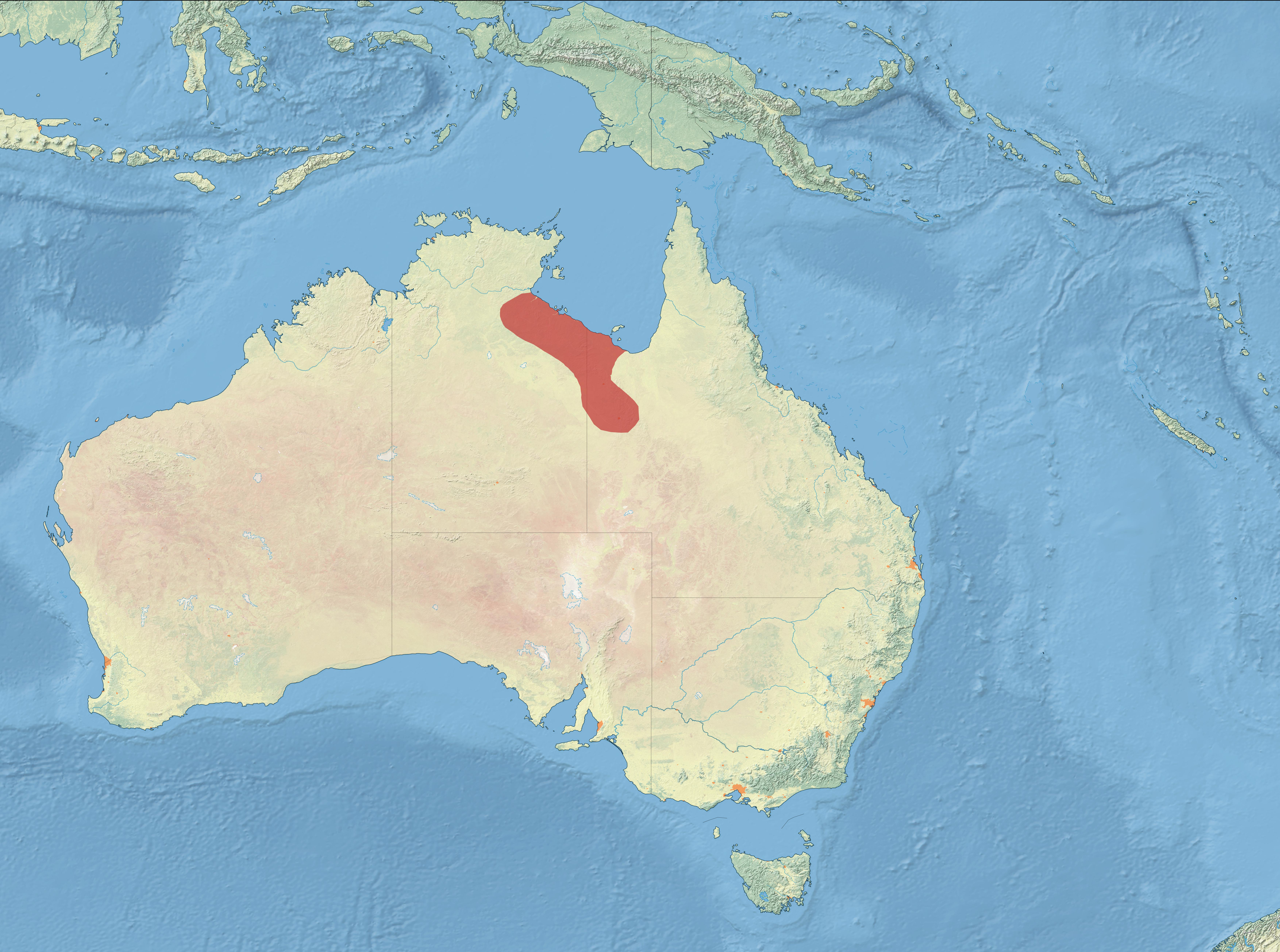
- range

= Carpentarian grasswren =

Species of bird

The Carpentarian grasswren (Amytornis dorotheae) is a species of bird in the family Maluridae. It is endemic to Australia.

Its natural habitat is subtropical or tropical dry shrubland. It is threatened by habitat loss. The habitat of this species is almost exclusively the rocky ranges north of Mount Isa. This habitat is not endangered by human encroachment other than by fires because of the extreme inaccessibility.

== Taxonomy and systematics ==
The species was formerly considered to be conspecific with the white-throated grasswren. It is monotypic.

== Behaviour and ecology ==
=== Diet ===
Feeds on insects and seeds. Forages by searching rock crevices and litter under shrubs on the ground.
