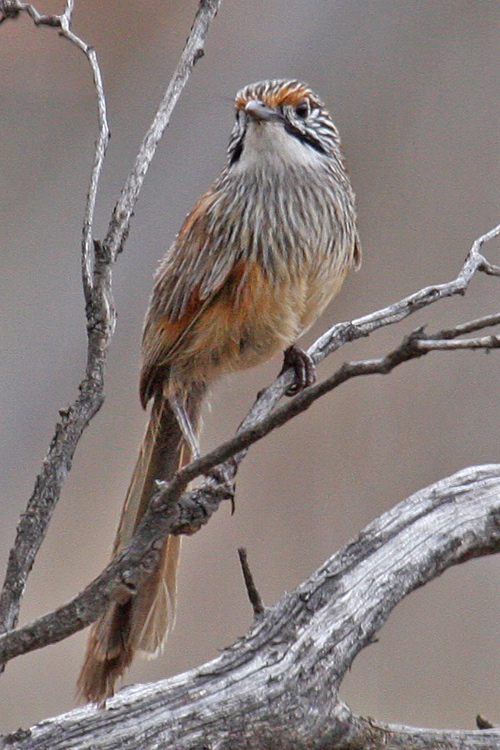
- Striated grasswren (Amytornis striatus)

Scientific classification
- Kingdom: Animalia
- Phylum: Chordata
- Class: Aves
- Order: Passeriformes
- Family: Maluridae
- Genus: Amytornis; Stejneger, 1885

Type species
- Malurus textilis Quoy & Gaimard, 1824

Species
- see text

Synonyms
- Amytis Lesson 1831; Diaphorillas; Magnamytis

= Grasswren =

Genus of birds

Grasswrens are birds in the genus Amytornis, part of the Australasian wren family, Maluridae.

== Taxonomy ==
The genus name Amytornis was coined in 1885 by the Norwegian born zoologist Leonhard Stejneger as a replacement for Amytis that had been introduced in 1831 by the French naturalist René Lesson. The name Amytis was pre-occupied as it had been used in 1822 by the French zoologist Marie Jules César Savigny for a group of annelid worms. As Lesson had listed two species in his new genus but had not specified a type, the type was designated by the English zoologist George Gray in 1841 as Malurus textilis Quoy and Gaimard, the western grasswren. The replacement name Amytornis combines the genus Amytis that had been introduced by Lesson with the Ancient Greek ορνις/ornis, ορνιθος/ornithos meaning "bird". Amytis was the daughter of the Median king Astyages, and the wife of Cyrus II.

Amytornis is the only genus classified within the subfamily Amytornithinae, and form a separate clade to the related fairy-wrens and emu-wrens within the family Maluridae. The genus contains 14 species, many of which are poorly known due to their secretive nature and remote and inaccessible habitat.

=== Extant species ===
The genus contains the following 14 species:

Image	Common name	Scientific name	Distribution
	Grey grasswren	Amytornis barbatus	New South Wales/Queensland
	Black grasswren	Amytornis housei	Western Australia.
	White-throated grasswren	Amytornis woodwardi	Northern Territory.
	Carpentarian grasswren	Amytornis dorotheae	Northern Territory/northwest Queensland.
	Short-tailed grasswren	Amytornis merrotsyi	South Australia
	Pilbara grasswren	Amytornis whitei	west Western Australia
	Sandhill grasswren	Amytornis oweni	central Western Australia to central Queensland and northwest South Australia
	Opalton grasswren	Amytornis rowleyi	Queensland, Australia
	Striated grasswren	Amytornis striatus	South Australia and Victoria
	Eyrean grasswren	Amytornis goyderi	Central Australia
	Western grasswren	Amytornis textilis	northwest Western Australia and South Australia
	Thick-billed grasswren	Amytornis modestus	New South Wales and South Australia
	Dusky grasswren	Amytornis purnelli	Northern Territory, Western Australia and South Australia.
	Kalkadoon grasswren	Amytornis ballarae	western Queensland

== Description ==
Grasswrens are the largest members of the Australasian wren family, ranging from 15 g (0.53 oz) for the Eyrean grasswren to the 35 g (1.2 oz) white-throated grasswren. They generally have long tails and legs and short wings and are adapted for life foraging on the ground. The bill is typically shorter and narrower than the fairy-wrens and emu-wrens, which reflects the larger part that seeds play in their diet. The plumage of the grasswrens is cryptic, usually red, buff and brown patterned with white and black.

== Distribution and habitat ==
Grasswrens are endemic to Australia. They inhabit remote arid or semi-arid regions of the continent in the interior and north. Species typically occupy small ranges as well. Most species of grasswrens inhabit habitat dominated by spinifex. They are often found in hilly areas dominated by rocks, which provides them with prey as well as shelter, particularly thermal shelter from extremes of heat or cold.
