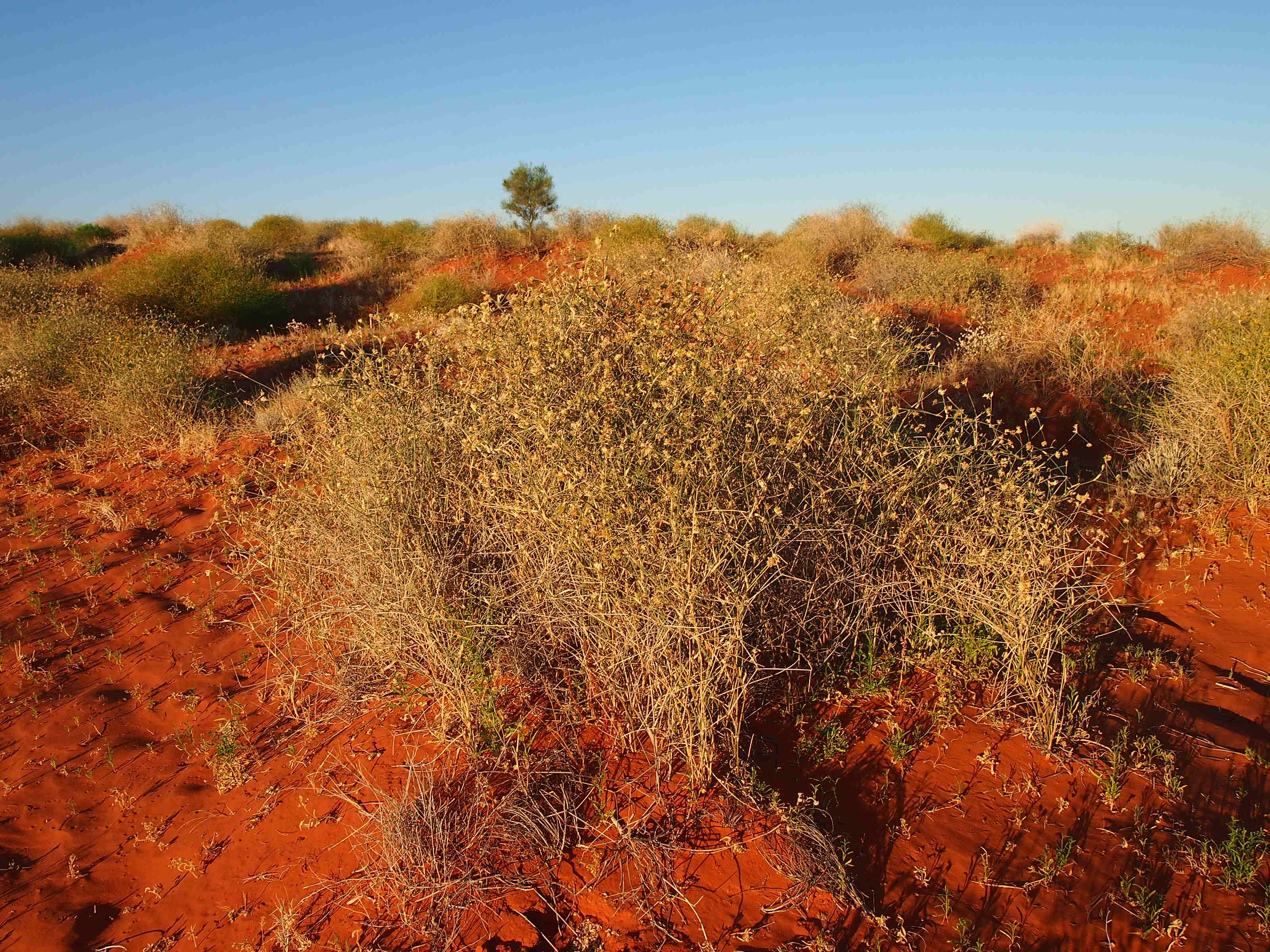

Scientific classification
- Kingdom: Plantae
- Clade: Tracheophytes
- Clade: Angiosperms
- Clade: Monocots
- Clade: Commelinids
- Order: Poales
- Family: Poaceae
- Subfamily: Panicoideae
- Supertribe: Panicodae
- Tribe: Paniceae
- Subtribe: Cenchrinae
- Genus: Zygochloa; S.T.Blake
- Species: Z. paradoxa

Binomial name
- Zygochloa paradoxa (R.Br.) S.T.Blake

Synonyms
- Neurachne paradoxa R.Br.; Panicum pseudoneurachne F.Muell.; Spinifex paradoxus (R.Br.) Benth.

= Zygochloa =

Sandhill canegrass

Species of plant

Zygochloa is a genus of desert plants in the grass family known only from Australia. The only known species is Zygochloa paradoxa, commonly known as sandhill canegrass. It occurs in extremely arid areas such as the Simpson Desert.

== Description ==
Zygochloa paradoxa is a dense, green, bushy perennial 1.5 m (4 ft 11 in) tall, 1 m (3 ft 3 in) wide, that forms tussocks or hummocks. Male and female flowers are found on different plants (dioecious). The plant has a rhizomatous stem that usually grows horizontally and has coarse roots .

The stem bearing the flowers (inflorescence), or culm, is hard and brittle with a shallow channel, up to at least 8 mm (0.31 in) in diameter and 40 cm (16 in) to 150 cm (59 in) tall, cylindrical or somewhat angled. Leaf-blades 1 cm (0.39 in) to 30 cm (12 in) long and 1 mm (0.039 in) to 10 mm (0.39 in) wide.

There are two types of flowers. The first type are male heads globular in shape, 1 cm (0.39 in) to 2 cm (0.79 in) in diameter. The second type are female heads which are also globular in shape, 2.5 cm (0.98 in) to 3.5 cm (1.4 in) in diameter, with the prominent chaffy bract like structures (bracteoles) having rigid tips. Male spikelet with no stem (sessile), 6 mm (0.24 in) to 8 mm (0.31 in) long. Female spikelets are solitary and having a short stem (pedicellate), 6 mm (0.24 in) to 10 mm (0.39 in) long.

Flowers mostly March to September.

== Taxonomy ==
Zygochloa paradoxa was first described by the botanist Robert Brown as Neurachne paradoxa in 1849. The type specimen was collected by Charles Sturt during his expedition into Central Australia (1844 to 1846), and is held by the Natural History Museum, London. Brown observed that the identification of the species was based on a single specimen which was imperfect in its leaves and stem, however, had sufficient fruits. Brown noted that the specimen differs materially in habit from the original species Neurachne alopeuroides, as well as from Neurachne mitchelliana. No location details were provided, but was likely to have been collected from near the junction of the borders of New South Wales, South Australia and Queensland.

In 1874, Ferdinand von Mueller moved the species to the genus Panicum and published a replacement name (nomen novum) Panicum pseudoneurachne, on the basis of the smooth hardened fruiting glume and palea.

Bentham proposed a new combination Spinifex paradoxa in 1877. Bentham thought that Mueller had overlooked the dioecious character of the plant, and taking into account the inflorescence being head-shaped (capitate), appeared to belong to the genus Spinifex. However, Bentham did note the discrepancy from Spinifex due to the small size of spikelets and the lack of long spines.

Blake moved the species to a new genus Zygochloa in 1941, identifying a number of key differences between the plant and Spinifex genus. Firstly, Blake noted that inflorescences in Spinifex are less densely head-shaped and considerably larger. Secondly, the extension of the peduncle in Spinifex into a very long, rigid tapering spine. Finally, in Spinifex the mature flowers disarticulate in their entirety from the plant, while in Zygochloa the heads appear to break up. Zygochloa paradoxa is the current accepted name for the species.

== Etymology ==
When Blake described the genus Zygochloa, he derived the name from Greek zygon (ζυγόν) meaning pair or yoke, and chloa (Xλόα) meaning grass. The name refers to the dioecious character of the species. Paradoxa is from the Greek para meaning irregular, and doxa meaning opinion. The plant is different from the expected in regard to related species.
