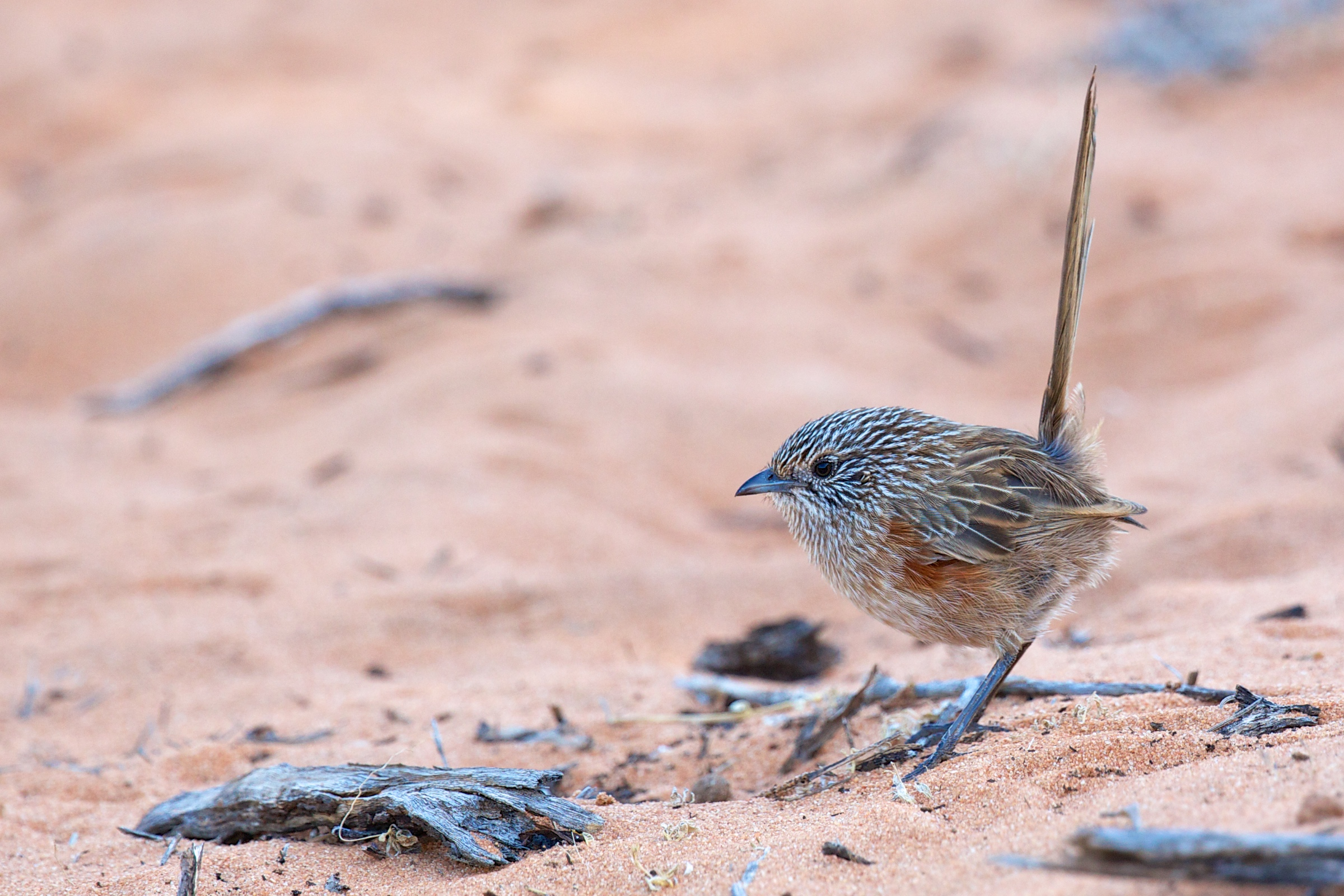

Conservation status
- Least Concern (IUCN 3.1)

Scientific classification
- Kingdom: Animalia
- Phylum: Chordata
- Class: Aves
- Order: Passeriformes
- Family: Maluridae
- Genus: Amytornis
- Species: A. textilis

Binomial name
- Amytornis textilis (Quoy & Gaimard, 1824)

Subspecies
- See text

= Western grasswren =

Species of bird

The western grasswren (Amytornis textilis), formerly known as the textile wren, is a species of bird in the family Maluridae. It is endemic to Australia. It was formerly lumped as the nominate subspecies of the thick-billed grasswren.

== Taxonomy ==
The western grasswren was formerly described in 1824 under the binomial name Malurus textilis in volume 30 of the Dictionnaire des Sciences Naturelles. The description was based on specimens collected on the Peron Peninsula of Shark Bay on the western coast of Australia by the French naturalists Jean Quoy and Joseph Gaimard during the circumnavigation of the world by the corvette Uranie that had been captained by Louis de Freycinet. A page at the front of the Dictionaire credits the naturalist Charles Dumont de Sainte-Croix for the ornithological entries but it is now believed that the text describing the western grasswren was written by Quoy and Gaimard and thus they are considered as the authorities. Later in 1824, a volume on the circumnavigation by the Uranie was published that included a very similar description of the western grasswren by Quoy and Gaimard. The western grasswren is now one of 14 grasswrens placed in the genus Amytornis that was named in 1885 by the French zoologist Marie Jules César Savigny.

Three subspecies are recognised:

- A. t. textilis (Quoy & Gaimard, 1824) – far west Western Australia (west Australia)
- † A. t. macrourus (Gould, 1847) – southwest Australia (extinct)
- A. t. myall (Mathews, 1916) – south South Australia (central south Australia)

== Description ==
A species of Amytornis, the western grasswren is a small, shy, mainly terrestrial bird. It has brown plumage, finely streaked with black and white, and a long, slender tail. Males are slightly larger than females, with adult males weighing 22–27 g and females 20–25 g. Females develop distinctive chestnut patches on their flanks beneath their wings at 1–2 months old. They are usually found in groups of two or three.

== Distribution and habitat ==
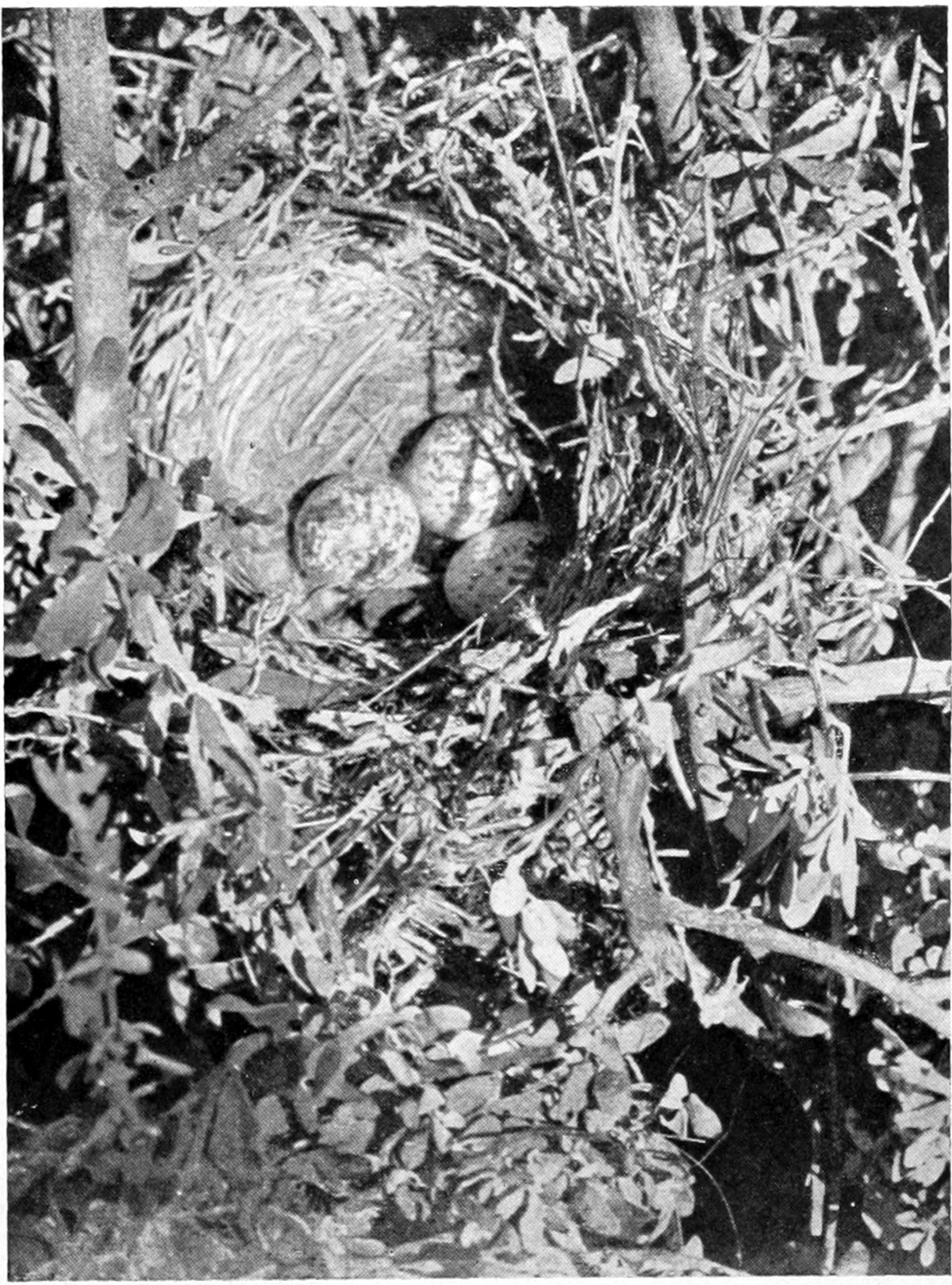
Nest and eggs, East Murchison district

The species once occurred through much of southwestern Australia, with an outlying subspecies in the Gawler Ranges of South Australia. The range of the nominate subspecies, which used to inhabit inland locations, has contracted westwards to the Shark Bay region since 1910. The cause is probably the decline in habitat quality resulting from overgrazing, which has reduced the availability of cover and nesting sites. Its preferred habitat is low, often Acacia dominated, semiarid shrubland, no more than a metre in height, that forms densely foliaged clumps and thickets.

The Southwest Australian subspecies (A. t. macrourus) is now extinct. Its preferred habitat was dense thickets within a variety of eucalypt communities.

== Status and conservation ==
The population size of the nominate subspecies (A. t. textilis) has been estimated at 21,500 individuals occurring over an area of 20,000 km^{2}, with an area of occupancy of 1200 km^{2}. The population comprises a large subpopulation within Francois Peron National Park and a second subpopulation consisting of several disjunct groups on nearby pastoral lands. Individuals from both populations were reintroduced to Dirk Hartog Island in 2022. The generation length has been estimated at four years. Although the subspecies has suffered a severe reduction in range and population decline in the past, the remaining population is healthy and stable, and is not considered eligible for listing under Australia's Environment Protection and Biodiversity Conservation Act 1999 (EPBC).

The Gawler Ranges subspecies (A. t. myall) has an estimated population of about 8400 mature individuals, with a range area of 12,000 km^{2} and an area of occupancy of 600 km^{2}. Its generation length has been estimated at 9.7 years and the population trend is one of decrease.
