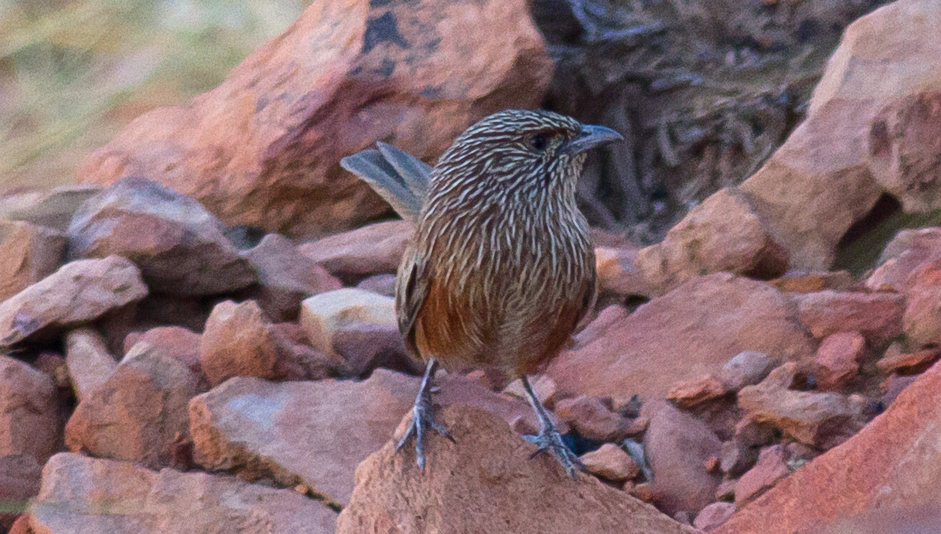
- in Mount Isa, Queensland, Australia

Conservation status
- Vulnerable (IUCN 3.1)

Scientific classification
- Kingdom: Animalia
- Phylum: Chordata
- Class: Aves
- Order: Passeriformes
- Family: Maluridae
- Genus: Amytornis
- Species: A. ballarae

Binomial name
- Amytornis ballarae Condon, 1969

= Kalkadoon grasswren =

Species of bird

The Kalkadoon grasswren (Amytornis ballarae), also called the Ballara grasswren, is a species of passerine bird in the family Maluridae. It is endemic to Australia.

== Taxonomy ==
It was formerly treated as a subspecies of the dusky grasswren. The English qualifier 'Kalkadoon' refers to the name of the Aboriginal group that lives in the area where it is found. The specific epithet ballarae refers to the deserted mining town of Ballara, in north-western Queensland between Mount Isa and Cloncurry.

== Description ==
It is similar to the dusky grasswren, though the markings are generally brighter and more defined, e.g. the wing coverts and remiges are grayish with a small rufous patch at the base of the outer remiges, compared with the same parts of the dusky grasswren being a uniformly dull rufous-brown.

== Distribution and habitat ==
The Kalkadoon grasswren has a restricted range, being endemic to spinifex covered hills in the Selwyn Range system of north-west Queensland.
