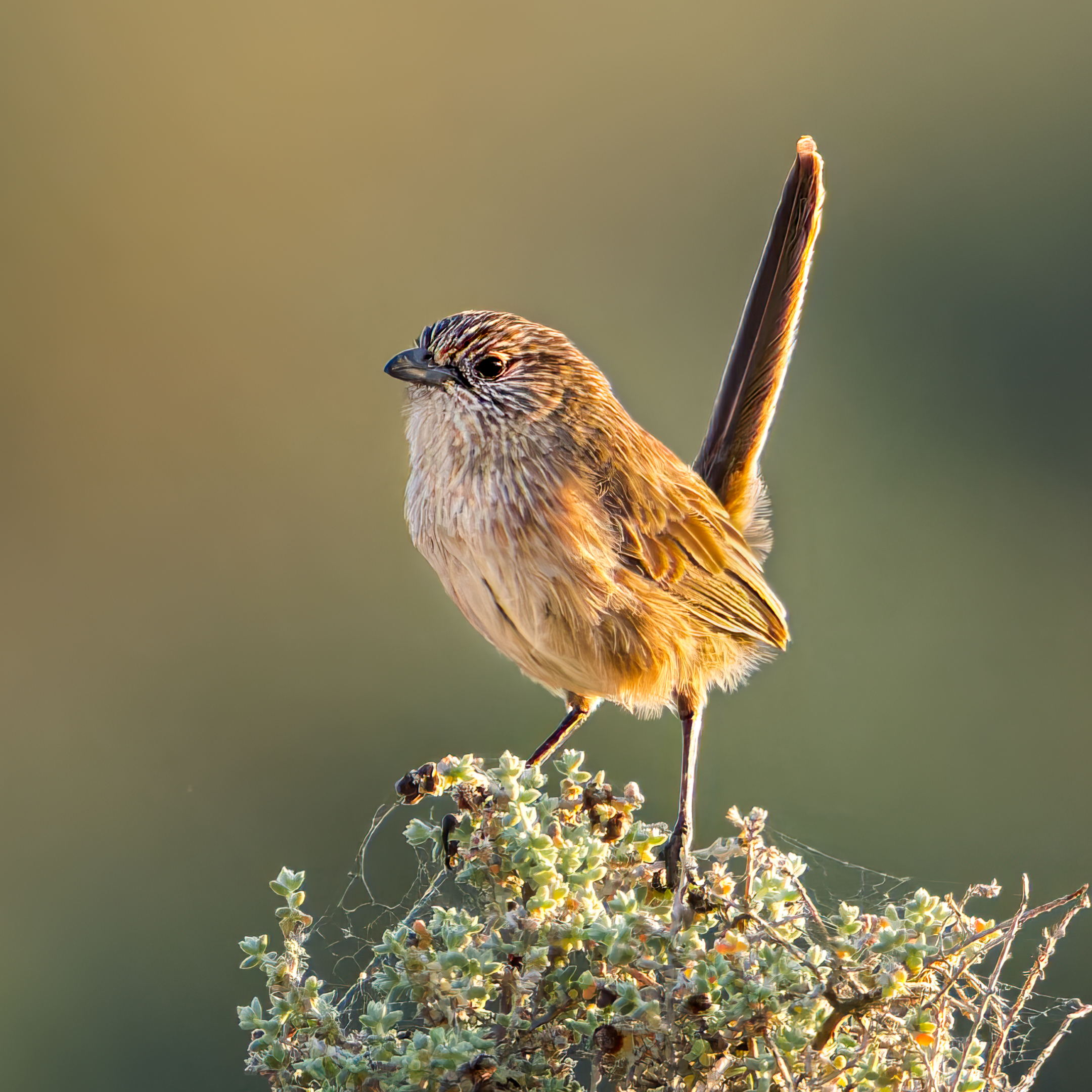

Conservation status
- Least Concern (IUCN 3.1)

Scientific classification
- Kingdom: Animalia
- Phylum: Chordata
- Class: Aves
- Order: Passeriformes
- Family: Maluridae
- Genus: Amytornis
- Species: A. modestus

Binomial name
- Amytornis modestus (North, 1902)

Subspecies
- See text

Synonyms
- Amytis modesta; Amytornis textilis modestus

= Thick-billed grasswren =

Species of bird

The thick-billed grasswren (Amytornis modestus) is a species of bird in the family Maluridae. It is endemic to Australia. Its natural habitat is Mediterranean-type shrubby vegetation.

== Taxonomy and systematics ==
The thick-billed grasswren was formerly considered as conspecific with the western grasswren until split as a separate species in 2010.

=== Subspecies ===
Seven subspecies have been identified in recent studies (Black 2011, 2016; Austin et al. 2013):

- †A. m. modestus – (North, 1902): Now extinct. Formerly found in Northern Territory
- A. m. indulkanna – (Mathews, 1916): Found in Northern Territory and South Australia
- A. m. raglessi – Black, 2011: Found in Flinders Ranges in South Australia
- A. m. curnamona – Black, 2011: Found in Lake Frome Basin in South Australia
- A. m. cowarie – Black, 2016: Found in Sturt Stony Desert in South Australia
- A. m. obscurior – (Mathews, 1923): Found in New South Wales
- †A. m. inexpectatus – (Mathews, 1912): Now extinct; formerly found in New South Wales

== Description ==
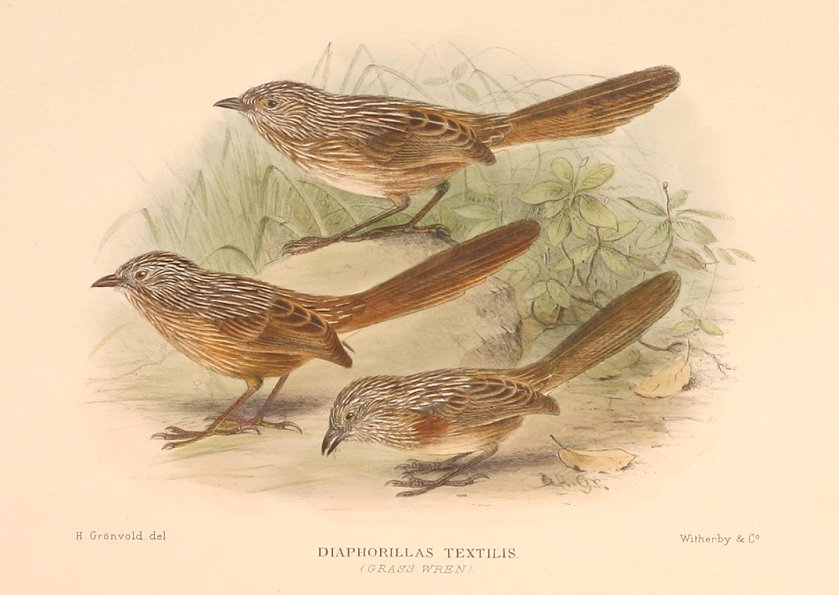
Illustration from 1910

The thick-billed grasswren has dull brown underparts, a long dark-brown tail and noticeable white streaking on the head. It has white streaks continuing down the neck, throat and down to the rump. The white streaks across the chin to the forehead and along the wings and rump, contrast with the red-brown to grey colours of the feathers. Males have distinguishably longer tails. Females also have chestnut flanks. Vocals are a combination of short high-pitched song, repeated. They have a soft, high-pitched call that is often inaudible to human ears.

== Distribution and habitat ==
The thick-billed grasswren is endemic to Australia and is found throughout the arid regions of northwestern New South Wales, northern parts of South Australia, through to southern sections of the Northern Territory. It is also speculated to still occur in fragmented populations in the Grey Range of Sturt National Park.

Chenopod scrublands (consisting largely of saltbush), sandhill cane-grass and flood debris in dry, sandy watercourses. They favour the scrublands with dense chenopod bushes. These denser shrublands usually occur in lower-lying areas, such as watercourses and drainage lines.

== Behaviour and ecology ==
Thick-billed grasswrens are usually sedentary, with these elusive birds seen running, hopping or rarely flying, between vegetative cover to remain undetected. They can also be seen foraging for food at ground level around vegetation. Wrens have a generalist beak type that allows them to eat a range of foods. The thick bill allows for tougher seeds and other food niches to be accessed, compared with the smaller fairy wren species. If disturbed, individuals take refuge in any existing cover – usually vegetation or piles of old flood debris along dry sandy watercourses and even down rabbit burrows. They are often seen solitarily or in pairs. Sources vary, but mating pairs maintain between five, and 20 to 40 hectare territories year-round and rarely, possibly never, band with their neighbours outside the breeding season. Family groups are sometimes seen during the post-fledgling period, while the young are still dependent on their parents. The feather patterns/markings imitate their preferred habitat as a form of camouflage.

=== Breeding ===
Breeding occurs between July and September. Nests can usually be seen in low branches in saltbush, can-grass and other similar vegetation. The nest composes of loose grass and bark in the shape of a half dome, with finer grass, fur, feathers lining the nest. One to three (usually two) eggs of various colourings of white, cream and pink; with blotches of red-brown or purplish grey. They have an incubation period of two weeks and fledge in 10–12 days. The estimated generation length of the thick-billed grasswren is four years .

=== Feeding ===
The thick-billed grasswren eats mainly insects and other small invertebrates, as well as plant seeds and berries.

== Conservation status ==
The main threat to thick-billed grasswrens is loss of habitat through clearing and overgrazing by hard-hooved animals, such as sheep and goats that trample the vegetation. This reduces the area and quality of the habitat that the thick-billed grasswren prefer, particularly the larger shrubs that provide prime habitat for breeding. Habitat modification has also occurred due to rabbits. Feral species, such as foxes and cats are major threats due to predation.

High-frequency bushires are also a threat to the quality of habitat. Higher frequency of fires disrupts the life-cycle processes of the thick-billed grasswren, as well as the plants and macroinvertebrates that they depend on. All threats have been compounded by droughts over the past decade. Changes in expected environmental conditions will also challenge tolerance ranges and exacerbate the impacts of existing threats to the species.

The thick-billed grasswren is a poor flyer, and because of this has a poor dispersal capability and is highly susceptible to population fragmentation.

The thick-billed grasswren was listed as a vulnerable species under the Commonwealth Environment Protection and Biodiversity Conservation Act 1999 (EPBC Act) on 26 July 2000, and as critically endangered under the Biodiversity Conservation Act 2016 (NSW) (February 2022 list) in New South Wales. However the IUCN Red List (2021.3 list) accords it a status of "least concern", as of July 2022.

The subspecies Amytornis modestus obscurior (north-west NSW) is listed as critically endangered by both the New South Wales and Commonwealth Governments.

A 2018 study ranked the species eighth in a list of Australian birds most likely to go extinct.
