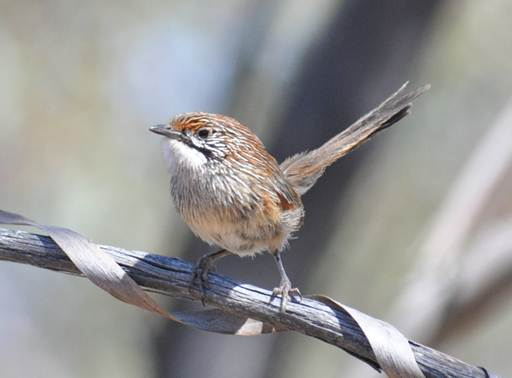
- Scotia Station, New South Wales. Source: Dan Eyles.

Conservation status
- Least Concern (IUCN 3.1)

Scientific classification
- Kingdom: Animalia
- Phylum: Chordata
- Class: Aves
- Order: Passeriformes
- Family: Maluridae
- Genus: Amytornis
- Species: A. striatus

Binomial name
- Amytornis striatus (Gould, 1840)

Subspecies
- See text
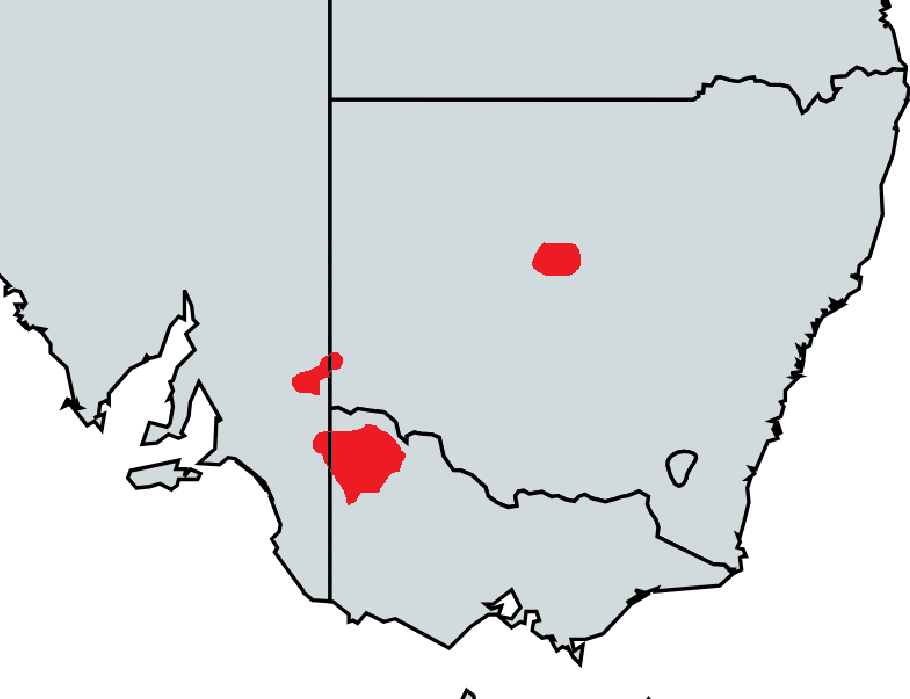
- Distribution

= Striated grasswren =

Species of bird

The striated grasswren (Amytornis striatus) is a small, cryptically coloured ground-dwelling species of wren-like bird in the family Maluridae, endemic to Australia. It occupies a large discontinuous range across arid and semi-arid areas of western, central and southern Australia where it is associated with spinifex (Triodia) grass.

== Description ==
The striated grasswren is one of 14 species in the genus Amytornis, commonly known as the grasswrens, found only in arid and semi-arid areas of Australia. All are small cryptic birds with long, usually cocked-tails, characterised by diagnostic distinctive interscapular gap in the feathering, an enlarged auditory bulla (tympanic chambers) and ten rectrices. The striated grasswren is a slim, long-tailed grasswren with a slender pointed bill. The plumage is highly variable across its range, suited to local soil and rock colour; birds are slightly sexually dimorphic; females have a brighter rufous flank-patch. All populations are soft red-brown above, streaked white; an orange-buff eyebrow and fore-supercilium; white throat; bold black submostachial stripe; and buffish underbody. Like other grasswrens they have short rounded wings and are unable to undertake long flights, typically flitting or hopping from perch to perch within vegetation, and run or hop when on the ground in a series of fast jerky movements. While closely related to the familiar fairy-wrens (Malurinae) striated grasswrens are larger (17–20g cf. 6–16g), and more sombrely coloured, with varyingly prominent white streaking on varying shades of brown, rufous and black plumage. Striated grasswrens are usually seen as pairs, but sometimes as individuals, and often in small groups of up to five birds, which are unobtrusive, shy, and typically difficult to approach, often first detected by their calls. When breeding, birds may be inquisitive of intruders of their territory.

== Ecology and behavior ==
=== Distribution and habitat ===
Striated grasswrens are the most widespread of the grasswrens, with a range which extends from through northern South Australia, across central and southwestern New South Wales, northwest Victoria and into southern and eastern South Australia. Populations of striated grasswren are strongly associated with sandplains, dunes and stony hills dominated by spinifex (Triodia) grass, with or without an overstorey of shrubs such as grevillea, Hakea, acacia, banksia or mallee eucalypts. Spinifex provides critical habitat for foraging and protective nesting and cover for this species, and also for most other species of grasswren. Striated grasswrens have been shown to have a preference for areas with large hummocks of spinifex, 25–40 years post-fire, though birds have been found to occupy some areas 6 to 8 years after fire.

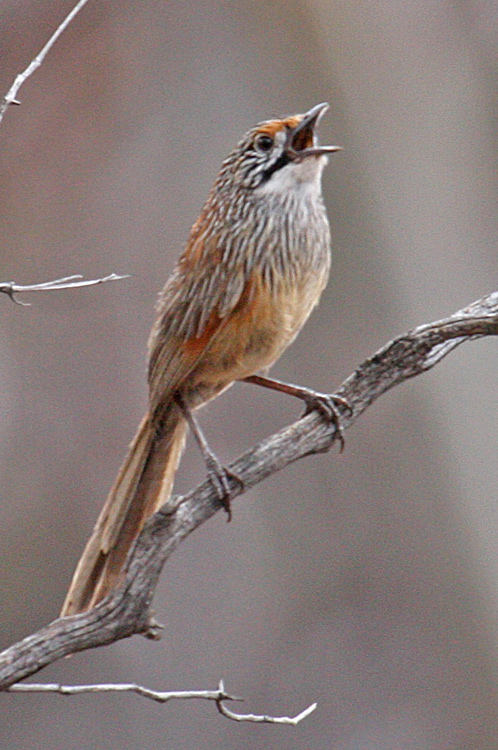
Striated grasswren, Gluepot Reserve, South Australia

=== Behaviour ===
Striated grasswrens may be active throughout the day, and in warm temperatures (over 35 °C) may be observed thermoregulating by holding wings partly open, but are generally more active in the early morning and late afternoon. Like other grasswrens, striated grasswrens mainly forage on the ground, sifting through leaf-litter beneath shrubs and surrounding spinifex Triodia tussocks, never far from cover. While foraging, birds move mainly by hopping, with tail held almost vertical; when moving through shrubs and dense vegetation, the tail is held horizontal. When disturbed in the open, they move with great speed and agility from cover-to-cover with a half-bounding half-flying action reminiscent of a bouncing ball.

=== Diet ===
Striated grasswrens are insectivorous and granivorous, foraging on the ground amongst leaf-litter and open areas, and gleaning from the foliage of herbs, forbs and low shrubs for primarily beetles and ants, and seeds of spinifex (Triodia) and other plants. Striated grasswrens have been often observed to form foraging associations with other bird species including rufous-crowned emu-wren (Stipiturus ruficeps), willie wagtail (Rhipidura leucophyrus) and variegated fairy-wren (Malurus lamberti).

=== Reproduction and social organisation ===
Striated grasswrens are most often recorded in pairs, and sometimes in groups of 3 and up to 10 birds, it is believed that pairs or family congregations may be more common outside of breeding season, and may range more widely over suitable areas of habitat. The cooperative breeding seen in other Maluridae has not been recorded in the wild in striated grasswrens. In captivity, members of family groups have been observed to allopreen and sunbathe together on branches, bathe in dry soil and fine water mists, and chase one-another around. Breeding is typically between July and November, but breeding outside of the usual period is likely to occur in response to sufficient rainfall, particularly in central and northern Australia. Nest is a bulky domed structure of spinifex spines, lined with bark strips, grass, plant down and feathers, close to the ground and well concealed, usually in a spinifex tussock. Eggs are rounded oval, white to pinkish white, finely textured and sparsely marked with purplish-red spots and blotches, mainly at the larger end. A clutch of 2, rarely 3 eggs is incubated by the female for 13–14 days. Upon hatching, both parents observed to be equally active in the feeding of chicks, and removal of faecal sacs. Chicks fledge at 12–14 days, and remain hidden in dense cover close to the nest for 3–4 days, not gaining full independence for a further 3 to 4 weeks. Striated grasswren nests are known to be parasitized by Horsfield's bronze cuckoo (Chrysococcyx basalis), black-eared cuckoo (Chrysococcyx osculans) and fan-tailed cuckoo (Cacomantis flabelliformis).

=== Call ===
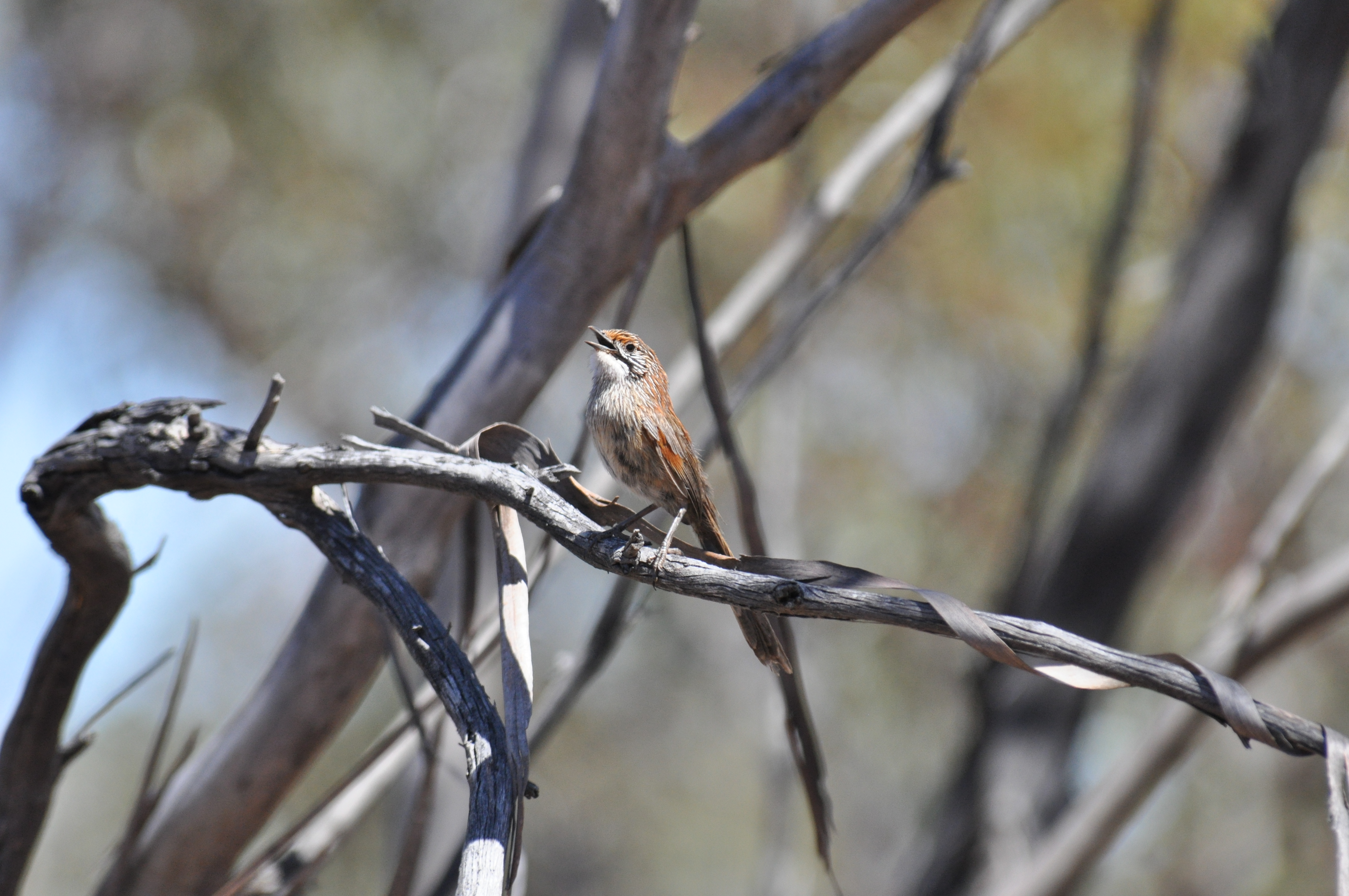
Striated grasswren calling at Scotia Station, New South Wales. Source: Dan Eyles

Striated grasswrens are recognised as having three calls: a contact call, song and an alarm call. The contact call has been described as a regularly uttered high pitched seep, see-see or tseee-tseet, which is very soft and may be inaudible in moderate winds. The song is diagnostic and much louder than contact calls, and may be audible for up to 40 m. It is described as a sweet, rippling wren-like reel, lasting up to 10 seconds, varying in pitch and consisting of whistles, buzzes, twangs and staccato notes, is uttered far less frequently, and has been observed singing from an exposed branch with its open bill pointing skywards. The alarm call is described as a series of short, loud, harsh single notes, transliterated as jit-jit or tchiritt, given when birds are flushed from cover.

== Taxonomy and systematics ==
The striated grasswren (Amytornis striatus) is a Passeriform in the Maluridae Family, which is shared with the familiar Australian and New Guinean fairy-wrens. It is one of 14 species of grasswren currently recognised in the subfamily Amytornithae, all within the Genus Amytornis, and confined to mainland Australia. The species was first described by John Gould in 1840 from a specimen collected on the Liverpool Plains of NSW. The scientific name of this species translates the genus Amytornis from Greek 'Amytis bird' Amytis being an ancient Persian female name with no direct link to the species, while ornis translates to 'bird' directly from Greek. The specific name refers to the heavily streaked upperparts, from Modern Latin striatus striped, streaked, which is in turn from Latin stria, a line.

== Conservation status ==
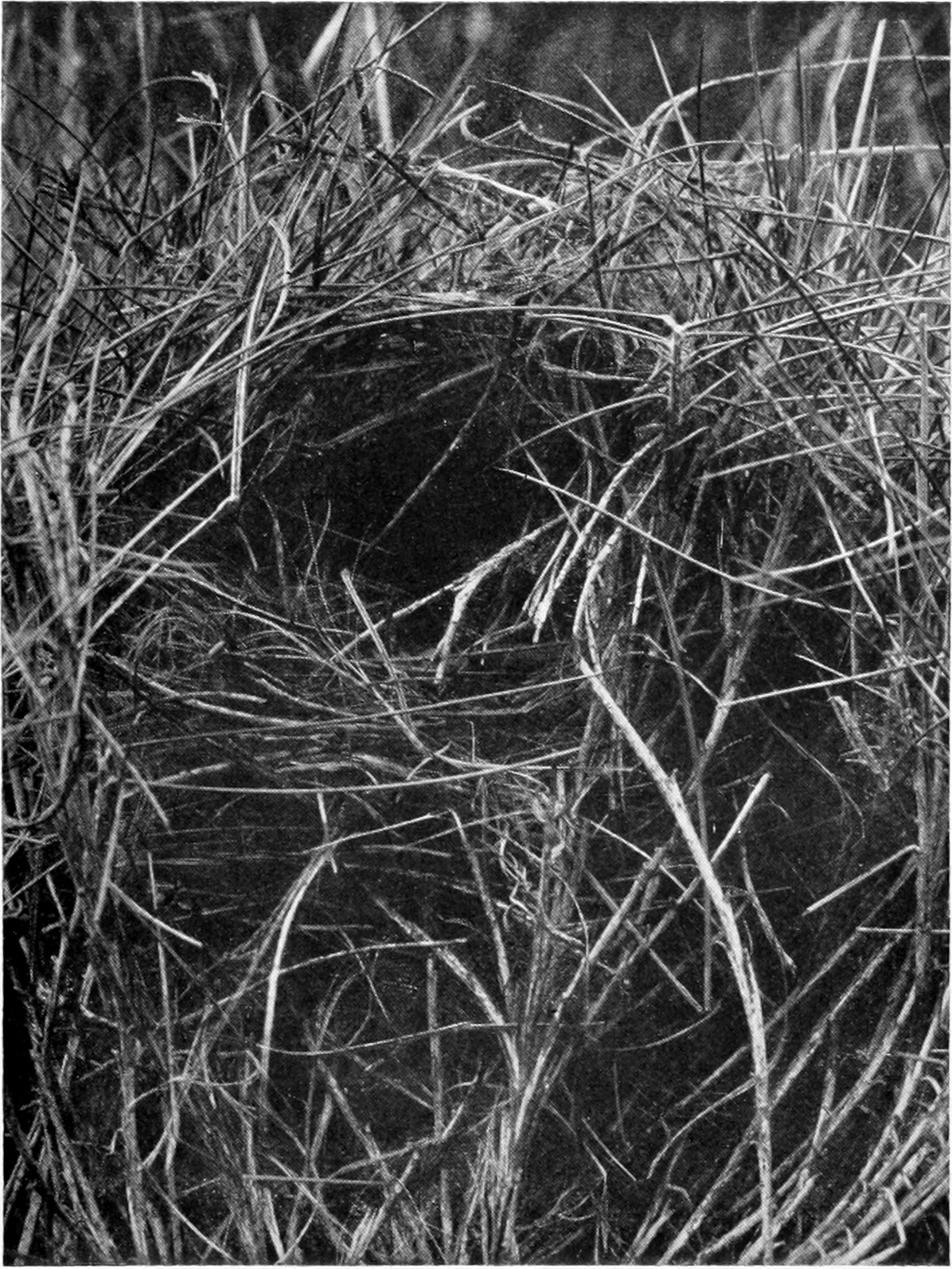
Nest photographed by F. L. Whitlock, East Murchison

=== Threats ===
Clearing of large areas for agriculture in the southeast of this species range have caused the direct loss of some populations and fragmentation of remnant areas of habitat, reducing the size of these populations rendering them more vulnerable to genetic effects and change events such as fire and drought. Striated grasswrens are vulnerable to large wildfires which cause direct mortalities of these weak flying species, and remove critical habitat and protection from predators, birds show a preference for areas with large hummocks of spinifex, 25–40 years post-fire, though birds have been found to occupy some areas 6 to 8 years after fire. Grazing by introduced herbivores affects habitat structure and is likely to contribute to population declines. Predation from introduced foxes and cats, particularly where populations have already declined, or are exposed by small areas of habitat following land clearance or fire.

=== Conservation status by state ===
The striated grasswren is listed as near threatened nationally under the Environment Protection and Biodiversity Conservation Act and within Victoria under the DELP Advisory List; and vulnerable in NSW under the Threatened Species Conservation Act and South Australia under the National Parks and Wildlife Act.

=== Future management ===
The management of fire to reduce the incidence of large wildfires removing vast areas of habitat, through prescribed burning and avoidance of anthropogenic fire is critical to the maintenance of areas of suitable habitat. Reduced stocking rates of introduced herbivores, particularly goats, and exclusion of these from some areas, to allow adequate regeneration of vegetation. Control of exotic pest species such as cats, foxes and rabbits reduces the threat of predation, and competition for resources.
