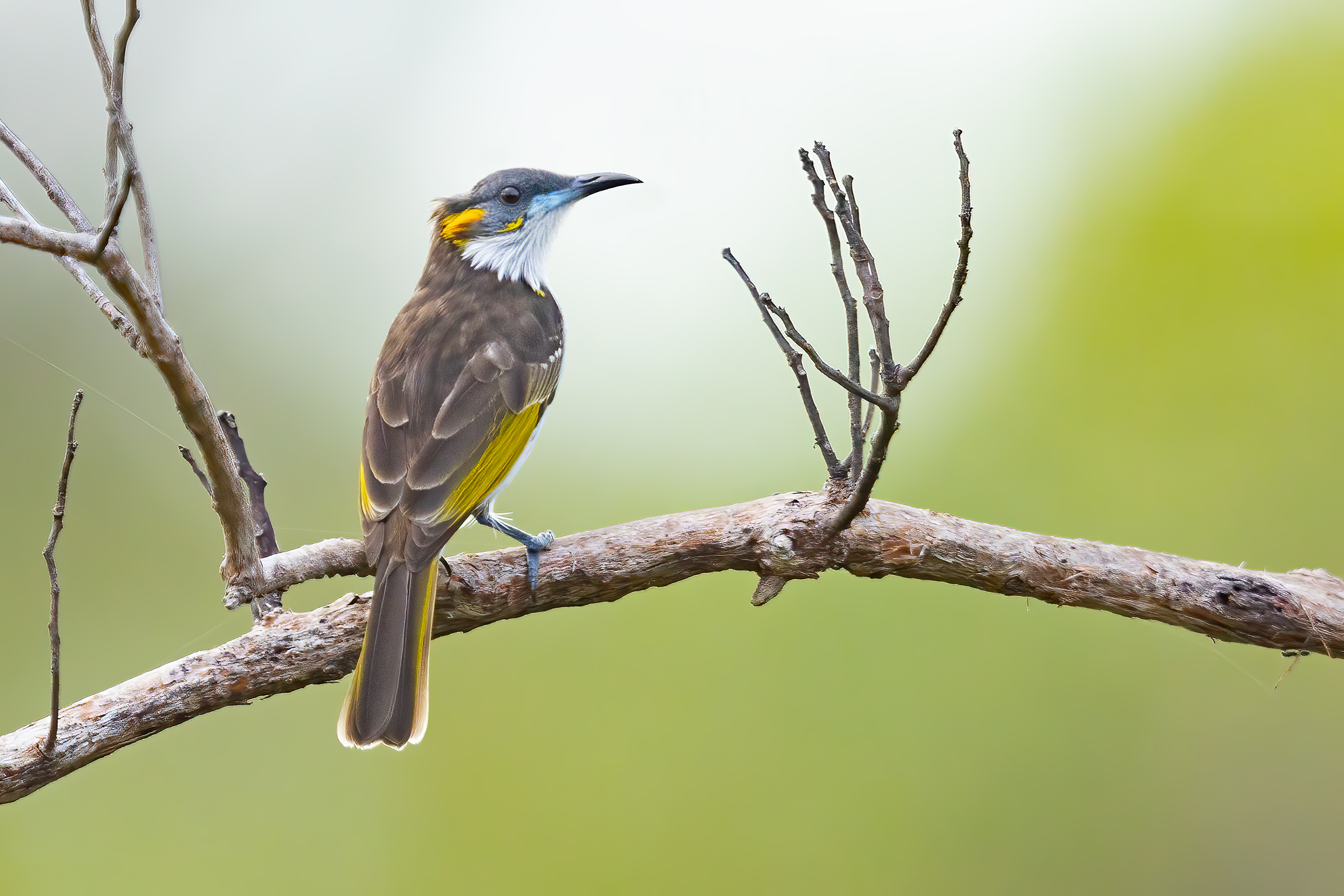

Conservation status
- Least Concern (IUCN 3.1)

Scientific classification
- Kingdom: Animalia
- Phylum: Chordata
- Class: Aves
- Order: Passeriformes
- Family: Meliphagidae
- Genus: Trichodere; North, 1912
- Species: T. cockerelli

Binomial name
- Trichodere cockerelli (Gould, 1869)
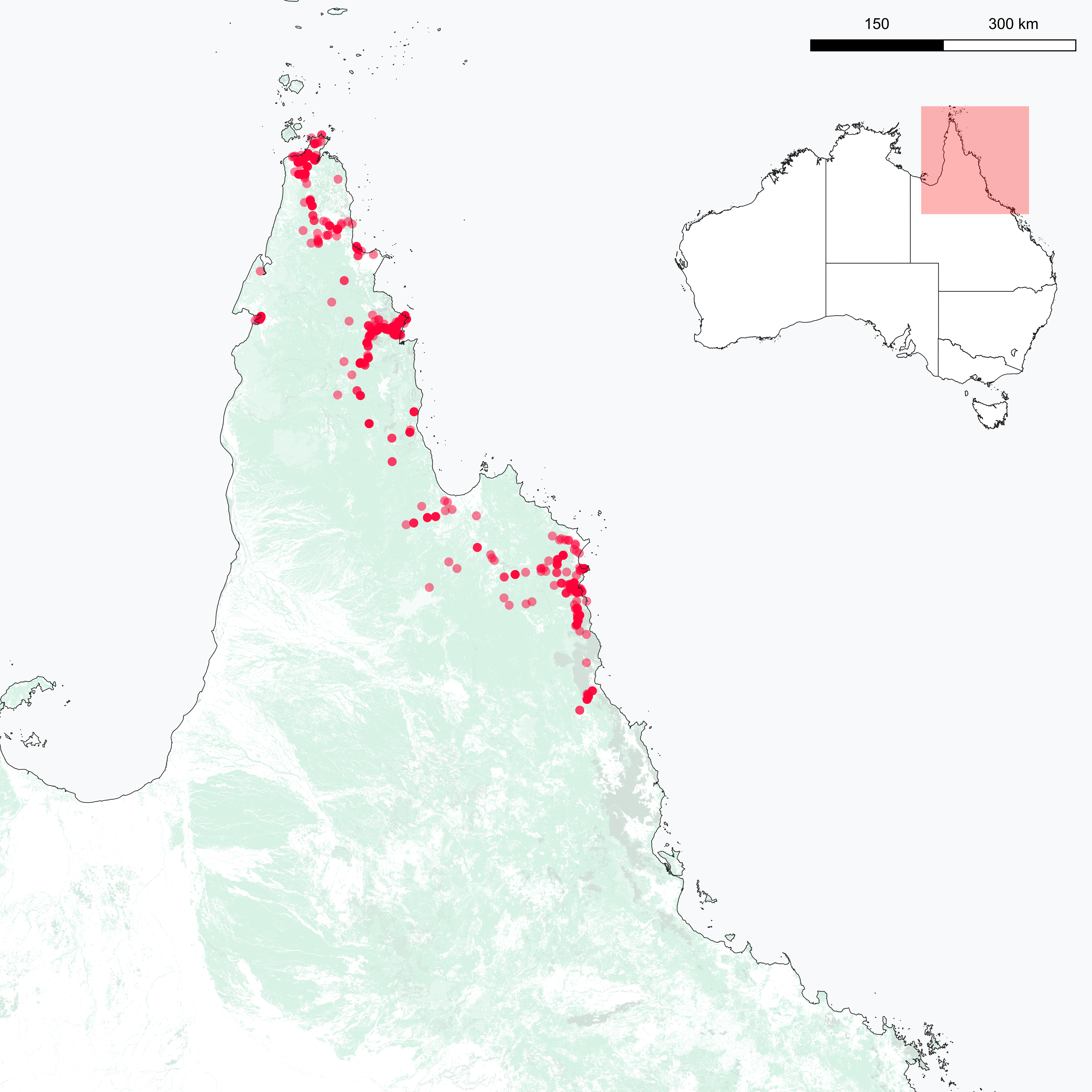

= White-streaked honeyeater =

Species of bird

The white-streaked honeyeater (Trichodere cockerelli) is a species of bird in the family Meliphagidae. It is monotypic within the genus Trichodere. It is endemic to Cape York Peninsula in Queensland, Australia. Its natural habitat is subtropical or tropical dry forest.

John Gould described the white-streaked honeyeater as Ptilotis cockerelli in 1869, naming it in honour of the person—one Mr Cockerell—who shot the specimen. Gould was unsure of which genus to place it in, noting it had features that linked it to Stigmatops and Meliphaga as well, and even contemplated placing it in its own genus. Alfred North erected the genus Trichodere in 1912, observing that its throat feathers were hairy in appearance, unlike any other honeyeater. The genus name was derived from the Ancient Greek words thrix 'hair' and deirē 'throat'.

A 2017 genetic study using both mitochondrial and nuclear DNA found the white-streaked honeyeater to lie within the clade of the genus Phylidonyris. Its ancestor diverged from the lineage giving rise to the New Holland honeyeater and white-cheeked honeyeater around 7 million years ago, and their common lineage diverged from that of the crescent honeyeater around 7.5 million years ago. Molecular analysis has shown honeyeaters to be related to the Pardalotidae (pardalotes), Acanthizidae (Australian warblers, scrubwrens, thornbills, etc.), and the Maluridae (Australian fairy-wrens) in the large superfamily Meliphagoidea.
