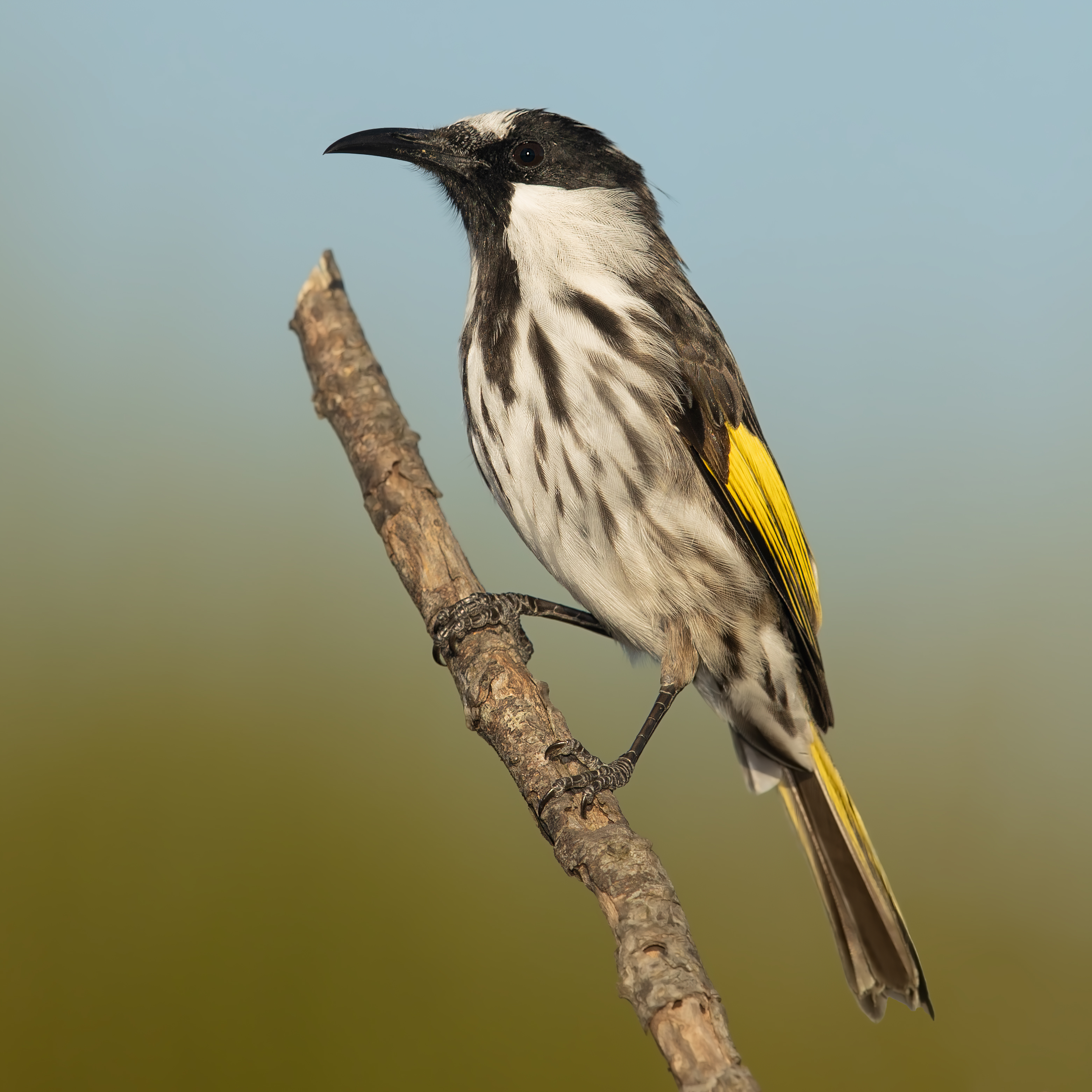

Conservation status
- Least Concern (IUCN 3.1)

Scientific classification
- Kingdom: Animalia
- Phylum: Chordata
- Class: Aves
- Order: Passeriformes
- Family: Meliphagidae
- Genus: Phylidonyris
- Species: P. niger

Binomial name
- Phylidonyris niger (Bechstein, 1811)

Synonyms
- Phylidonyris nigra

= White-cheeked honeyeater =

Species of bird

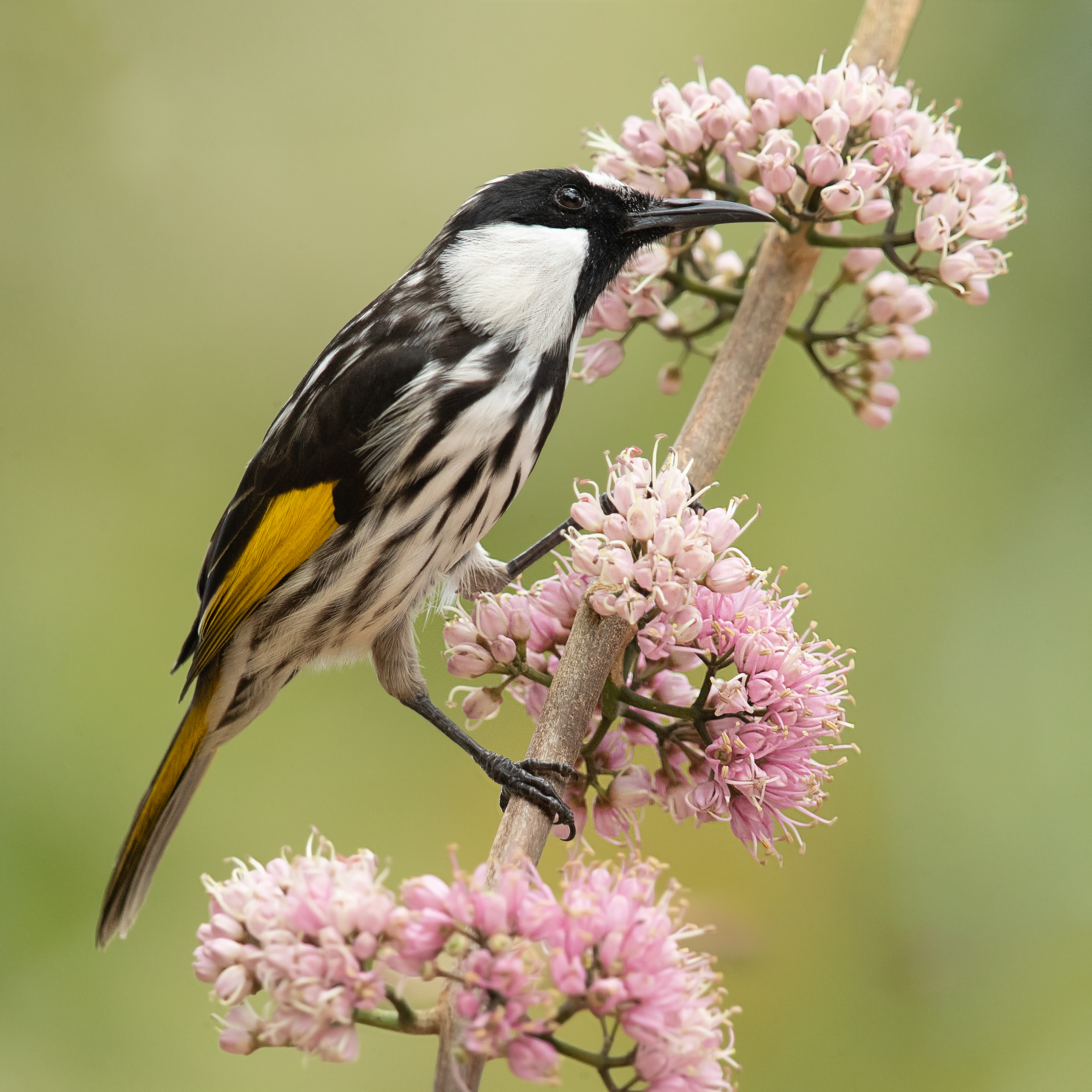
Hasties Swamp National Park

The white-cheeked honeyeater (Phylidonyris niger) is a species of honeyeater that inhabits the east coast and the south-west corner of Australia. It has a large white patch on its cheek, brown eyes, and a yellow panel on its wing.

== Taxonomy ==
The white-cheeked honeyeater was formally described by the German naturalist Johann Matthäus Bechstein in 1811. He placed it with the tree creepers in the genus Certhia and coined the binomial name Certhia nigra. His account was based on "L'Héorotaire noir" that had been described and illustrated in 1802 by the French ornithologist Louis Pierre Vieillot. Bechstein specified the type locality as "Neuholland", now Sydney, New South Wales. The white-cheeked honeyeater is now one of three species placed in the genus Phylidonyris that was introduced in 1830 by René Lesson. The generic name Phylidonyris combines the term Phylédon or Philédon, used by the French naturalist Georges Cuvier in 1817 for the friarbirds (now placed in the genus Philemon), with Cinnyris (Cuvier, 1816) for the sunbirds; the specific epithet derives from Latin niger 'black'.

Two subspecies are recognised: Phylidonyris niger niger in eastern Australia; and P. n. gouldii (Schlegel, 1872) in southwest Western Australia. The latter subspecies has a narrower white cheek-patch, slightly more black on the breast, and different vocalizations, which in future may lead to its classification as a separate species.

== Description ==
The white-cheeked honeyeater is a medium-sized black and white honeyeater, with a long, sturdy bill that curves downwards. It has large bright-yellow tail and wing panels, with a large conspicuous white cheek-patch on a mainly black head. The eye is dark brown and it has a long, tapering, white brow-line. Young birds have a yellow gape and brow and the plumage is dusky or dull brownish. It is gregarious, active and noisy with swift, erratic flight. It is 16–20 cm (6.3–7.9 in) in length; males weigh 15.5–25 g (0.55–0.88 oz) and females 15.5–20 g (0.55–0.71 oz).

The vocalizations include a distinctive yapping call "chwikup, chwikup"; a melodious "chippy-choo, chippy-choo" and a higher, repeated lilting "twee-ee-twee-ee" call given in display song-flight during the breeding season.

=== Similar species ===
The New Holland honeyeater, Phylidonyris novaehollandiae, is very similar in size, shape and appearance, but can be distinguished by its white eye. Other black and white honeyeaters are much smaller, including the crescent (P. pyrrhoptera), tawny-crowned (Gliciphila melanops) and white-fronted honeyeaters (Purnella albifrons). Although very similar in appearance, there is not much competition between white-cheeked and New Holland honeyeaters, as they choose different perching sites and have different nesting seasons.

== Distribution and habitat ==
The white-cheeked honeyeater is endemic to eastern and south-western Australia. It ranges from east of the Great Divide in Queensland through coastal New South Wales, becoming scattered south to Jervis Bay. It also occurs in south-western Western Australia and from Israelite Bay, east of Esperance, to the Murchison River in Kalbarri National Park.

It is usually found in moist heathlands, as well as around paperbark swamps and wetlands, and in forests or woodlands with a heath understory. Occurring in both temperate and subtropical zones, it is found in parks, gardens and flowering street trees throughout their range. Not afraid of humans and adapting easily to settlement activity, it is sometimes killed by cats.

== Behaviour ==
Cooloolah NP, SE Queensland, Australia

Mostly resident or sedentary, with some seasonal movement at edge of range.

=== Food and feeding ===
White-cheeked honeyeaters feed mainly on nectar from the flowers of Banksia, eucalypt, Grevillea, bottlebrush, heath, Darwinia (in southwest Western Australia), Calothamnus and Dryandra species. They also glean insects on bark or sally and hover for them in the air. They often feed busily and noisily in small groups and may feed beside New Holland honeyeaters.

=== Breeding ===
White-cheeked honeyeaters pair monogamously for the breeding season, which can be at any time of year coincident with nectar availability, though peaking from August to November and March to May. Males defend breeding territories that can be held for several years. Males aggressively attack other birds of their own and other species during the breeding season, but not familiar birds such as their own mates, relatives and resident neighbours. There is not much competition between white-cheeked and New Holland honeyeaters, as they choose different perching sites and have different nesting seasons. The female builds a cup-shaped nest from twigs, strips of bark, and other plant materials, bound with spider web, and lined with plant down and pieces of flowers. The nest is placed low in forked branches of trees or shrubs, often close to the ground, but well-concealed in dense foliage or in grass below shrubs and ferns. A clutch of 2 or 3 eggs, each measuring 21 mm × 15 mm (0.83 in × 0.59 in), is laid. The eggs are whitish buff to pink, splotched with chestnut-red and slate-grey towards the large end. The female incubates the eggs for 15 days. Both parents feed the nestlings for 15 days, then continue feeding the young for several weeks after fledging.

== Conservation status ==
The white-cheeked honeyeater is classified as least concern on the IUCN Red List.
