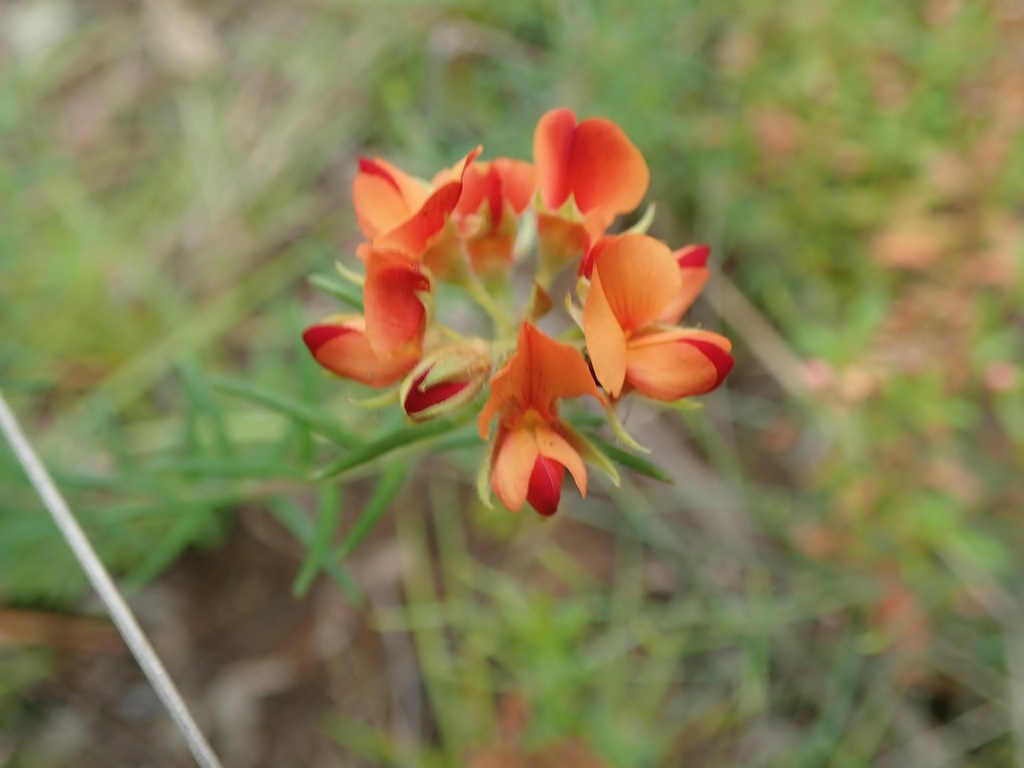
- Near Wollombi

Scientific classification
- Kingdom: Plantae
- Clade: Embryophytes
- Clade: Tracheophytes
- Clade: Angiosperms
- Clade: Eudicots
- Clade: Rosids
- Order: Fabales
- Family: Fabaceae
- Subfamily: Faboideae
- Genus: Oxylobium
- Species: O. pulteneae

Binomial name
- Oxylobium pulteneae DC.

Synonyms
- Callistachys hamulosa (A.Gray) Kuntze; Callistachys pulteneae (DC.) Kuntze; Callistachys sparsa A.Cunn. ex Benth.; Chorizema pulteneae (DC.) F.Muell.; Chorozema pulteneae F.Muell.; Oxylobium hamulosum Benth. ex A.Gray; Pultenaea acuminata R.T.Baker; Pultenaea sylvatica DC. nom. inval., pro syn.

= Oxylobium pulteneae =

Wiry shaggy pea

Species of flowering plant

Oxylobium pulteneae, commonly known as wiry shaggy pea, is a species of flowering plant in the family Fabaceae and is endemic to eastern New South Wales. It is a low, spreading to prostrate shrub with linear to triangular or elliptic leaves and orange-red flowers.

== Description ==
Oxylobium pulteneae is a low, spreading to prostrate shrub that usually grows to a height of 15–60 cm (5.9–23.6 in), and has stems with soft hairs. The leaves are usually arranged in whorls of three, sometimes arranged alternately or in opposite pairs, and are linear to triangular or elliptic, 5–15 mm (0.20–0.59 in) long and 1–3 mm (0.039–0.118 in) wide, with the tip and sides curved down. The flowers are borne in umbel-like racemes with egg-shaped to lance-shaped bracts and linear bracteoles at the base. The sepals are 5–7 mm (0.20–0.28 in) long and the petals orange-red and about 10 mm (0.39 in) long. Flowering occurs in late spring and summer, and the seed pods are about 10 mm (0.39 in) long and covered with soft hairs.

== Taxonomy ==
Oxylobium pulteneae was first formally described in 1825 by Alphonse Pyramus de Candolle and the description was published in his Prodromus Systematis Naturalis Regni Vegetabilis.

== Distribution and habitat ==
Wiry shaggy pea grows in forest, mainly in the Hunter Valley as far west as Goulburn River National Park and as far south as Wisemans Ferry.
