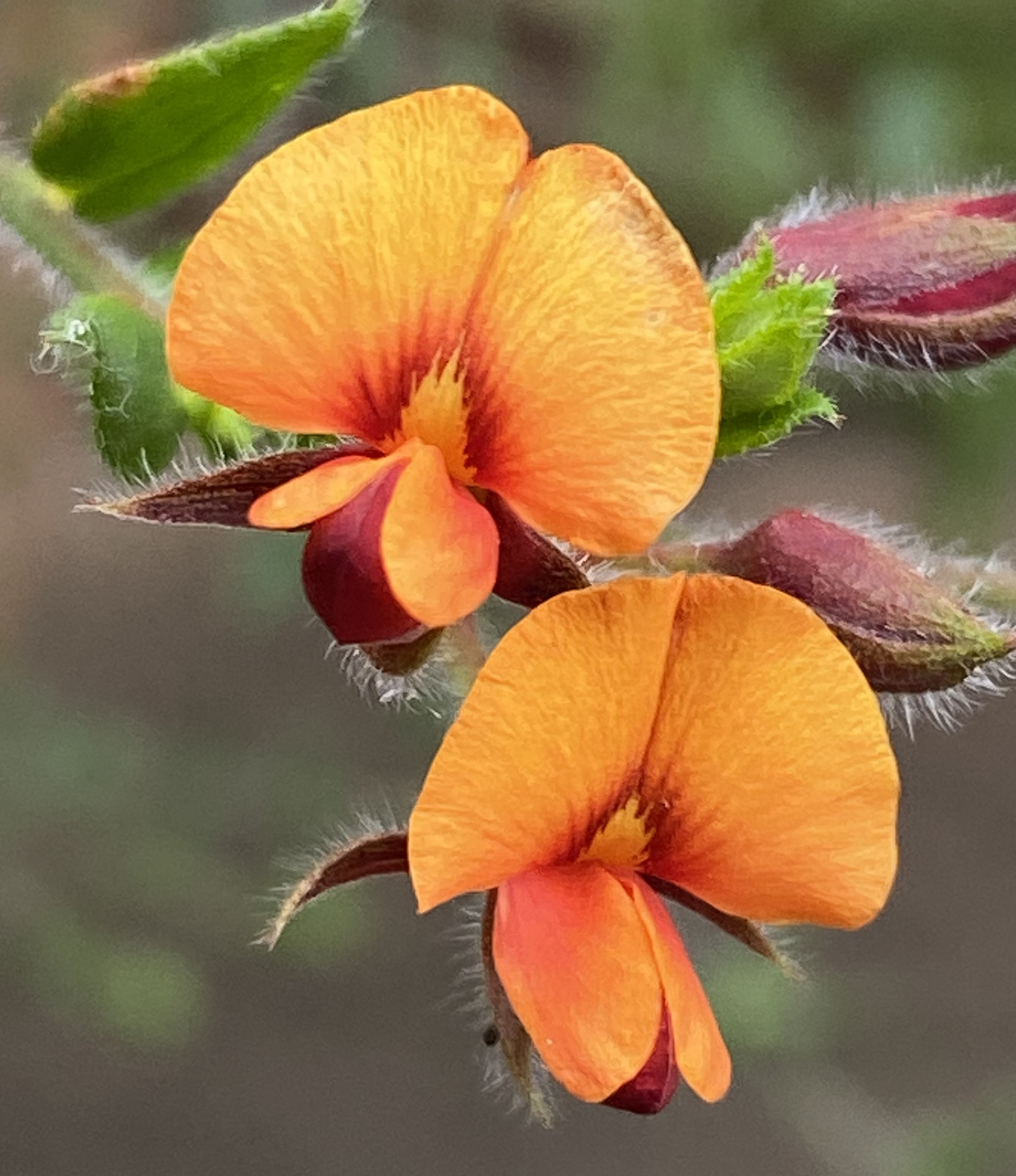
- Oxylobium cordifolium

Scientific classification
- Kingdom: Plantae
- Clade: Tracheophytes
- Clade: Angiosperms
- Clade: Eudicots
- Clade: Rosids
- Order: Fabales
- Family: Fabaceae
- Subfamily: Faboideae
- Clade: Mirbelioids
- Genus: Oxylobium; Andrews

Species
- See text

= Oxylobium =

Genus of legumes

Oxylobium, commonly known as shaggy-peas, is a genus of flowering plants in the family Fabaceae, all of which are endemic to Australia. Plants in the genus Oxylobium are prostrate or erect shrubs with simple leaves with the edges turned down, flowers in racemes, clusters or corymbs with 5 sepals, the standard petal longer than the wings and keel, and inflated oval or oblong pods.

== Description ==
Plants in the genus Oxylobium are prostrate or erect shrubs with usually hairy young stems. The leaves are simple, usually arranged in opposite pairs or whorled and often warty, the edges rolled down and sometimes with stipules at the base of the petiole. The flowers are arranged in racemes, clusters or corymb with bracts and bracteoles that often fall off as the flowers open. There are 5 sepals with upper lobes broader and higher up, the standard petal broad and more or less notched and longer than the wings and the keel. The stamens are free from each other and the pods are oval or oblong.

== Taxonomy ==
The genus Oxylobium was first formally described by Henry Cranke Andrews in 1807, the description was published in The Botanist's Repository for New, and Rare Plants and the type specimen was Oxylobium cordifolium.

== Species ==
The following is a list of species of Oxylobium accepted by the Australian Plant Census as at November 2024:

- Oxylobium arborescens R.Br. — tall shaggy pea (N.S.W., Qld., Vic., Tas.)
- Oxylobium cordifolium Sm. – heart-leaved shaggy pea (N.S.W.)
- Oxylobium ellipticum (Vent.) R.Br. — common shaggy-pea (N.S.W., Qld., Vic., Tas.)
- Oxylobium pulteneae DC. — wiry shaggy pea (N.S.W.)
- Oxylobium robustum Joy Thomps. – tree shaggy pea (N.S.W., Qld.)
