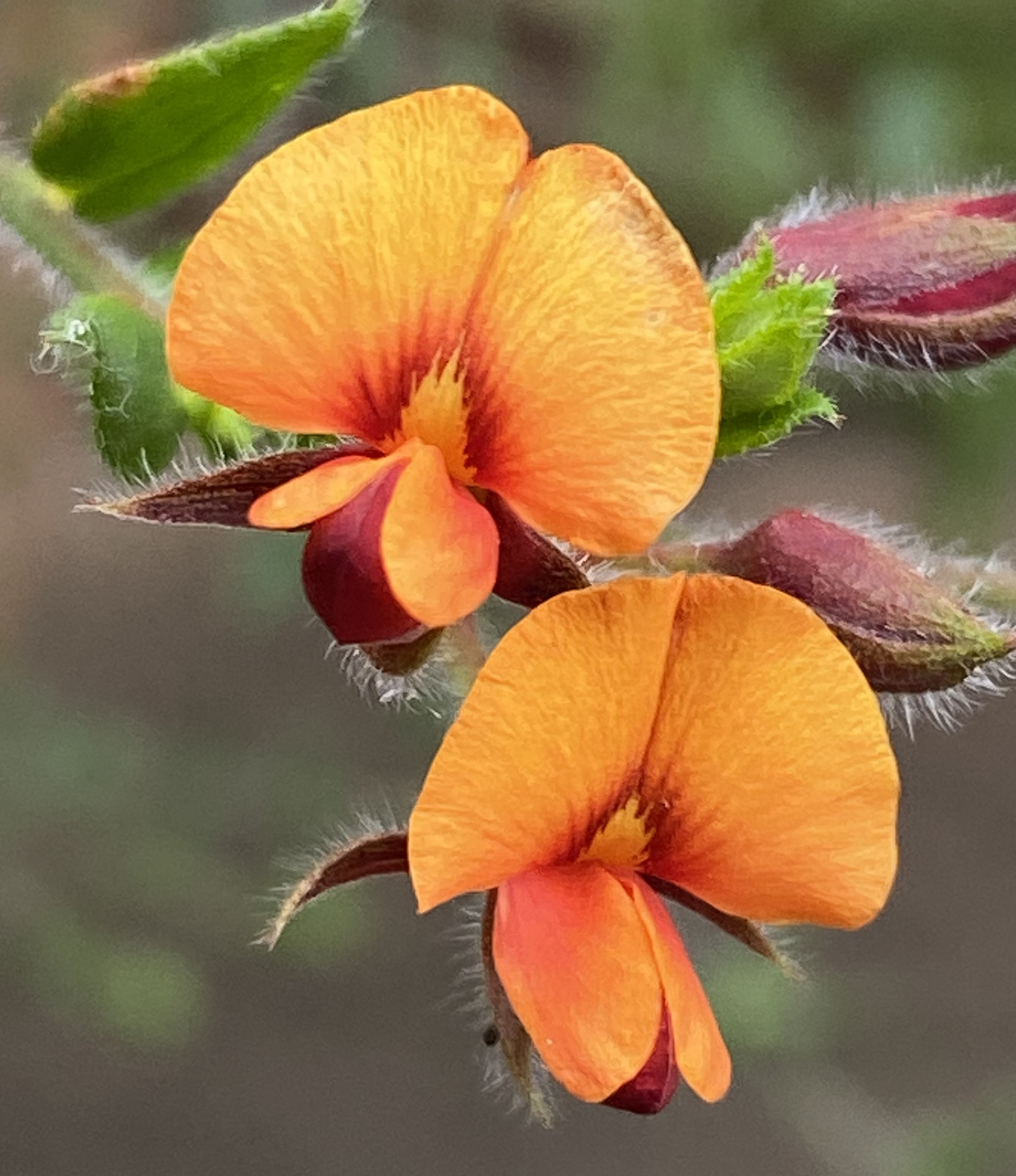

Scientific classification
- Kingdom: Plantae
- Clade: Embryophytes
- Clade: Tracheophytes
- Clade: Angiosperms
- Clade: Eudicots
- Clade: Rosids
- Order: Fabales
- Family: Fabaceae
- Subfamily: Faboideae
- Genus: Oxylobium
- Species: O. cordifolium

Binomial name
- Oxylobium cordifolium Andrews

Synonyms
- Chorozema cordifolium F.Muell.; Chorizema cordifolium (Andrews) F.Muell.; Callistachys cordifolia (Andrews) Kuntze

= Oxylobium cordifolium =

Heart-shaped shaggy pea

Species of flowering plant

Oxylobium cordifolium, commonly known as the heart-leaved shaggy pea, is a species of flowering plant in the family Fabaceae and is endemic to New South Wales. It is a small, prostrate shrub with long, wiry branches, heart-shaped leaves and orange-red flowers.

== Description ==
Oxylobium cordifolium is a small, spreading shrub to about 30 cm (12 in) high with branches up to 40 cm (16 in) long and are densely covered with long, soft, straight hairs. The heart-shaped leaves are arranged opposite or whorled, 0.3–0.8 cm (0.12–0.31 in) long, 2–5 mm (0.079–0.197 in) wide, margins and apex curved downward, upper surface covered with warty protuberances, underside sparingly hairy. The orange-red flowers are borne at the end of branches in racemes, usually in groups of three, standard petal 6–8 mm (0.24–0.31 in) long, bracts lance-shaped and taper to a point. The soft, oval-shaped seed pod is covered in soft, silky hairs, sessile, 8–10 mm (0.31–0.39 in) long and tapering to a point. Flowering occurs from spring to early summer.

== Taxonomy ==
Oxylobium cordifolium was first formally described in 1807 by Henry Cranke Andrews and the description was published in The Botanist's Repository for New, and Rare Plants. The specific epithet (cordifolium) means "heart leaved".

== Distribution and habitat ==
Heart-leaved shaggy pea grows on damp, sandy soils in heath and coastal headlands south of Sydney, Tumut and Conjola districts.
