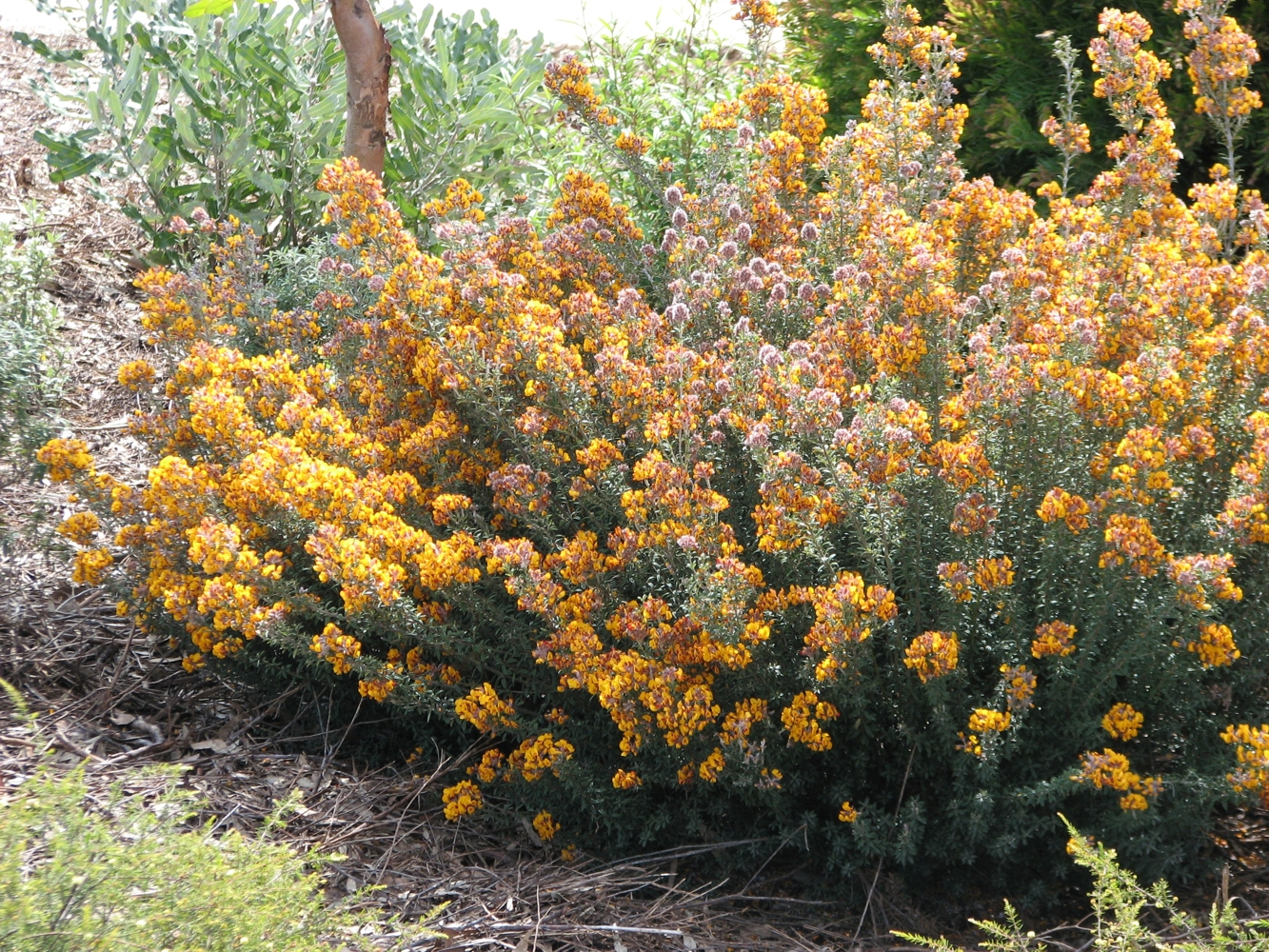
- In Royal Botanic Gardens, Cranbourne

Scientific classification
- Kingdom: Plantae
- Clade: Tracheophytes
- Clade: Angiosperms
- Clade: Eudicots
- Clade: Rosids
- Order: Fabales
- Family: Fabaceae
- Subfamily: Faboideae
- Genus: Oxylobium
- Species: O. ellipticum

Binomial name
- Oxylobium ellipticum (Vent.) R.Br.

Synonyms
- List: Callistachys elliptica Vent.; Chorozema ellipticum F.Muell. nom. inval.; Gompholobium ellipticum Labill.; Oxylobium ellipticum var. alpinum Maiden & Betche; Oxylobium ellipticum (Vent.) R.Br. var. ellipticum; Pleurandra reticulata Hook.

= Oxylobium ellipticum =

Common shaggy-pea

Species of legume

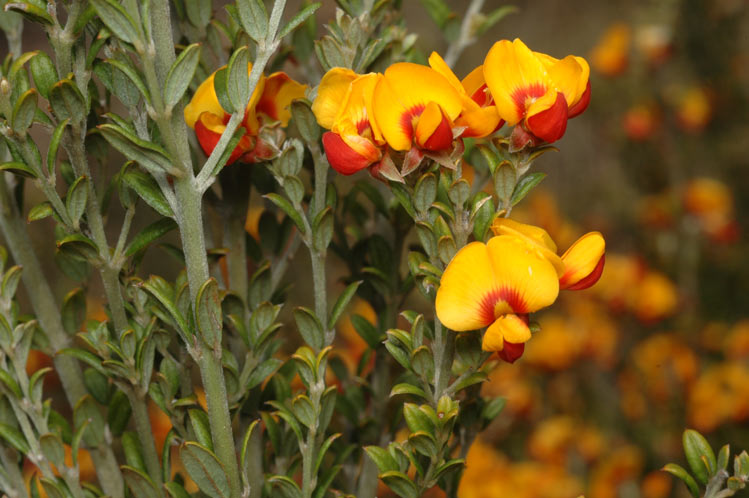
Flowers

Oxylobium ellipticum, commonly known as the common shaggy-pea, is a flowering plant in the family Fabaceae. It has dense clusters of yellow pea flowers and elliptic-shaped leaves. It grows in south-eastern Australia.

== Description ==
Oxylobium ellipticum is a spreading much branched shrub up to 2 m (6 ft 7 in) high. The leaves are in irregular whorls of three or four, elliptic, sometimes lance-shaped, rarely heart-shaped, 0.5–3 cm (0.20–1.18 in) long, 3–10 mm (0.12–0.39 in) wide, leathery, brown tomentose beneath, dark green, reticulate veins and margins recurved, apex blunt, often with an abrupt point. It has golden yellow pea flowers in dense terminal clusters. Flowering occurs in spring and summer and the fruit is a rounded, grey-brown, oval-shaped pod about 7–8 mm (0.28–0.31 in) long and covered with long, silky hairs.

== Taxonomy and naming ==
Oxylobium ellipticum was first formally described in 1811 by Robert Brown and the description was published in Hortus Kewensis. The specific epithet (ellipticum) refers to the shape of the leaves.

== Distribution and habitat ==
Oxylobium ellipticum is widespread in montane ecosystems in Victoria, in open forest and woodland on the tablelands and south-west slopes of New South Wales and Tasmania, and frequently grows on skeletal soils and organic brown peat on quartzite sand.
