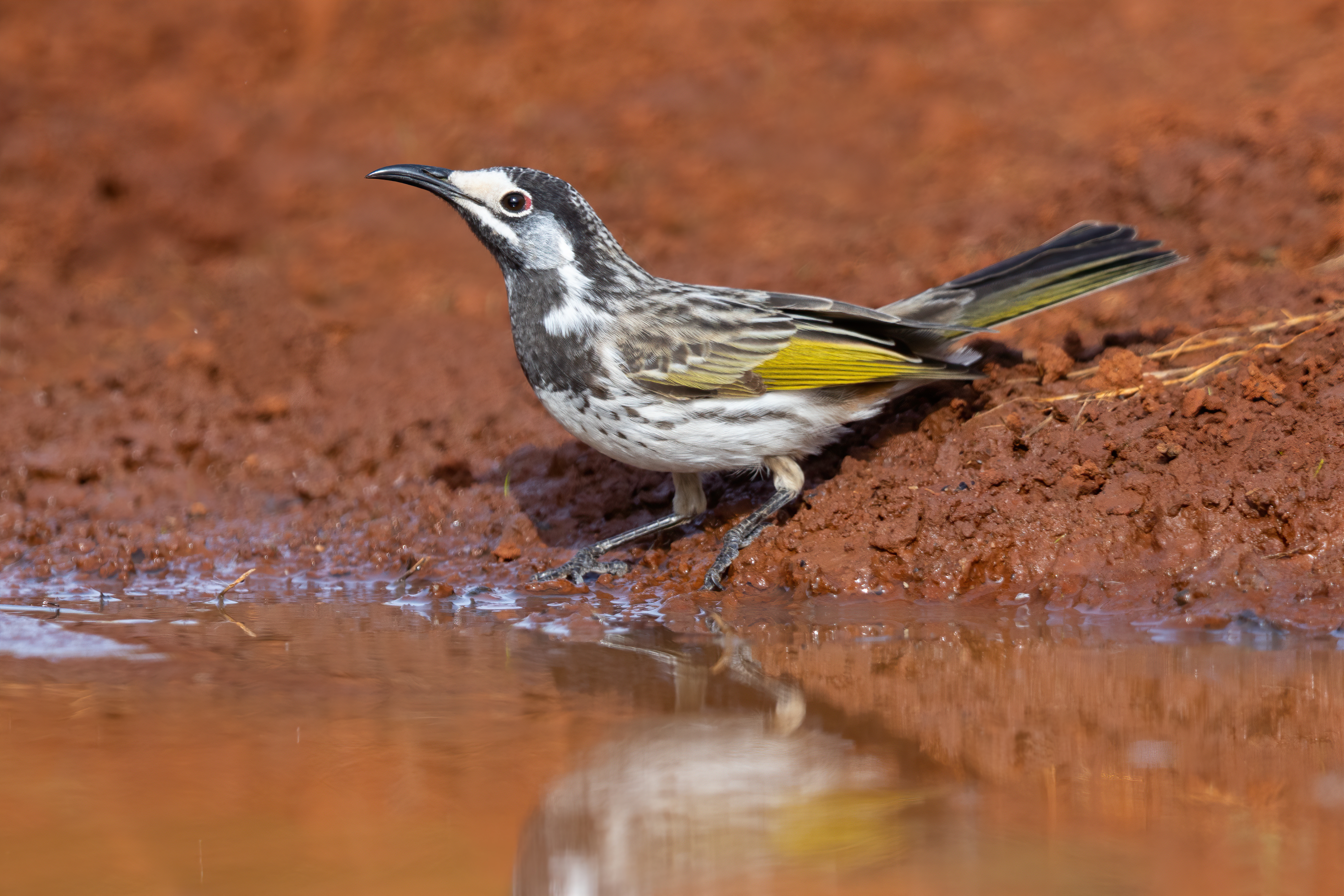

Conservation status
- Least Concern (IUCN 3.1)

Scientific classification
- Kingdom: Animalia
- Phylum: Chordata
- Class: Aves
- Order: Passeriformes
- Family: Meliphagidae
- Genus: Purnella; Mathews, 1914
- Species: P. albifrons

Binomial name
- Purnella albifrons (Gould, 1841)
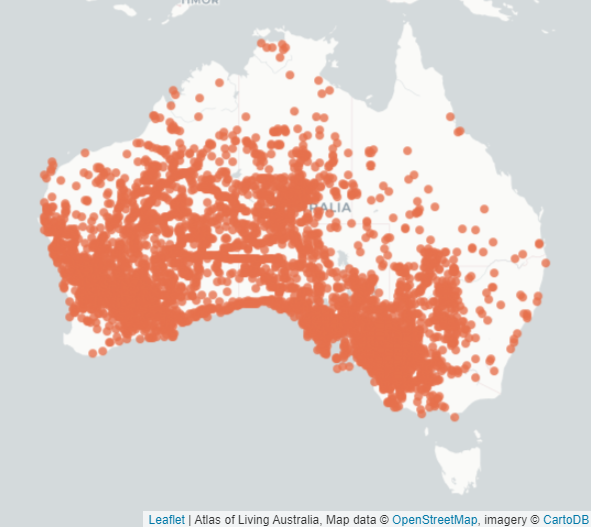
- Distribution of white-fronted honeyeaters throughout Australia.

= White-fronted honeyeater =

Species of bird

The white-fronted honeyeater (Purnella albifrons) is a medium-sized bird species endemic to Australia. Mainly distributed throughout arid and semi-arid landscapes. The white-fronted honeyeater has distinct colourings with a white face, black or brown upper chest with white speckles and yellow panels on their brown wings.

The white-fronted honeyeater was described by the English bird artist John Gould in 1841 and given the binomial name Glyciphila albifrons. The specific epithet combines albus meaning 'white' with frons meaning 'forehead' or 'front'. The white-fronted honeyeater was formerly in the genus Phylidonyris, but is now classified as their own genus, Purnella. The generic name was chosen to honour the oologist and collector, Herbert A. Purnell.

== Ecology ==
=== Diet ===
White-fronted honeyeaters (as the name suggests) primarily consume nectar from flowers. Studies have been undertaken to expand this field of knowledge and it has been identified that when nectar is not available or in minimal supply, white-fronted honeyeaters may consume a range of other materials such as seeds, plant matter and insects. This level of variation within the diet allows white-fronted honeyeaters to be able to adapt to different environments and survive in arid areas. The diet of white-fronted honeyeaters has been determined by previous observational studies as well as the analysis of gizzard contents.

=== Behaviour ===
The white-fronted honeyeater moves quickly throughout landscapes; foraging for food and avoiding predators. The species regularly frequents tall shrub species, such as Eremophila shrubs and flowering mallee plants.

White-fronted honeyeaters breed in small colonies. This process ensures that white-fronted honeyeaters can warn their neighbours of the same species of potential predators when they are at their most vulnerable. The female white-fronted honeyeater constructs their nest from materials that are easy to find within their landscape, and that can add support and structure to the nest. These materials include a range of organic matter such as grasses, spider webs, roots, bark and plant stems. They are woven together to create a cup-like nest which is then lined with an extra layer to provide warmth and comfort to the chicks. This nest lining is composed of a mix of wool, cotton threads, fur and plant material. Nests are generally constructed in the lower branches of shrubs.

The female white-fronted honeyeaters nurtures and broods the eggs, providing warmth and safety. When the eggs hatch, both the female and male white-fronted honeyeaters work tirelessly to provide sufficient food for their young.

== Predatory threats ==
White-fronted honeyeaters must remain vigilant of predators at all times including when brooding their young. Other bird species can be a major threat to nesting white-fronted honeyeaters as species such as butcherbirds, currawongs and corvids are known for raiding the nests of other bird species. These nest raiders are known to consume the eggs or young chicks of honeyeaters within Australia. Some snake species, such as the northern brown snake, are also known as nest predators, as they also consume the young chicks and eggs of the white-fronted honeyeater.

Accidents can happen during breeding season resulting in the destruction of the eggs or the nest. Heavy rain events can destroy nests or dislodge the nest from the shrub where it is located. Honeyeater species in general have been found to occasionally destroy eggs.

== Conservation ==
White-fronted honeyeaters are currently classified as 'least concern' under the IUCN red list. The species is secure in the majority of States and Territories in Australia, including SA, VIC, NSW, QLD, NT and WA.

White-fronted honeyeaters are not found in Tasmania due to the geographical distance from mainland Australia and the landscape composition of Tasmania.

== Gallery ==
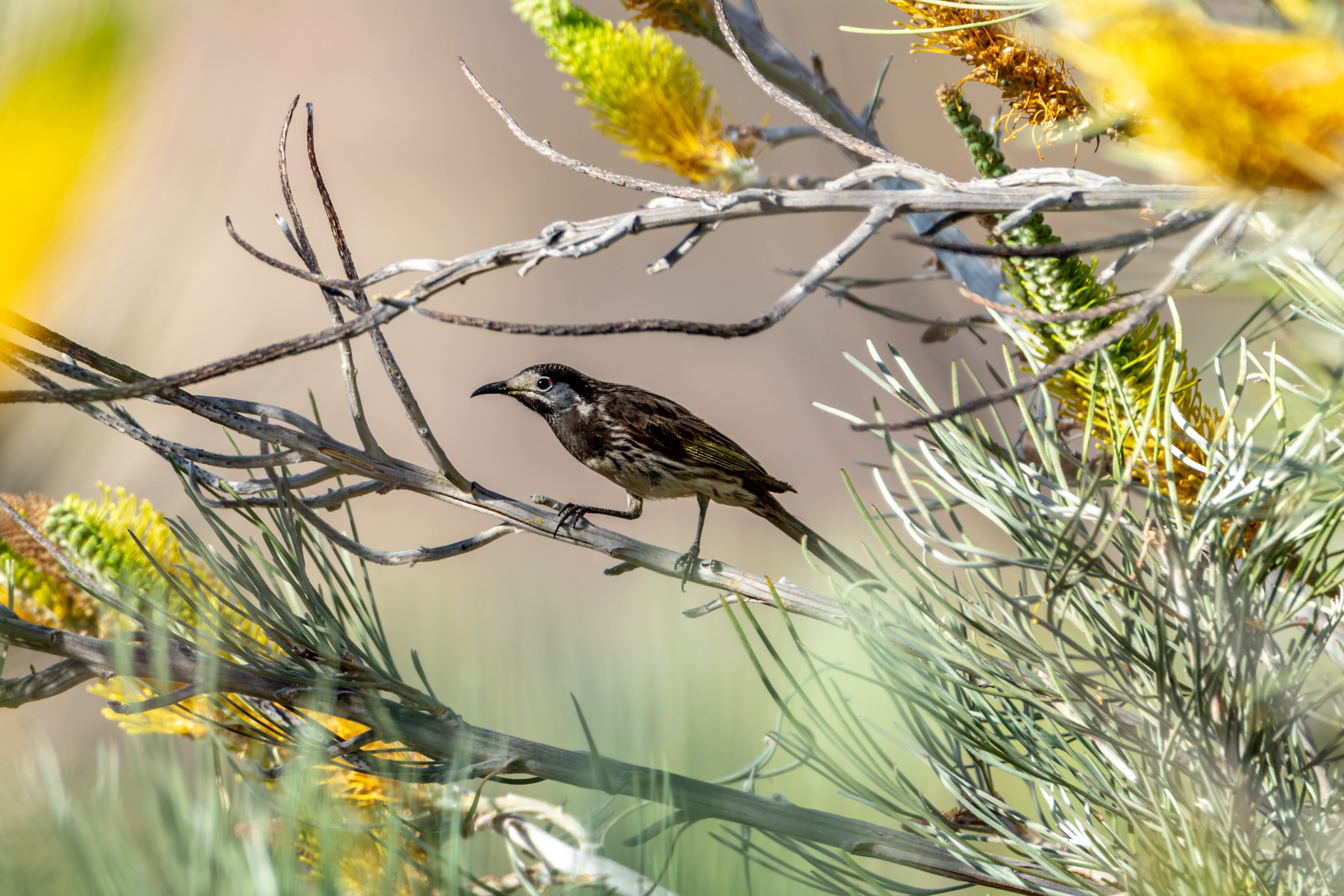
White-fronted honeyeater in a shrub

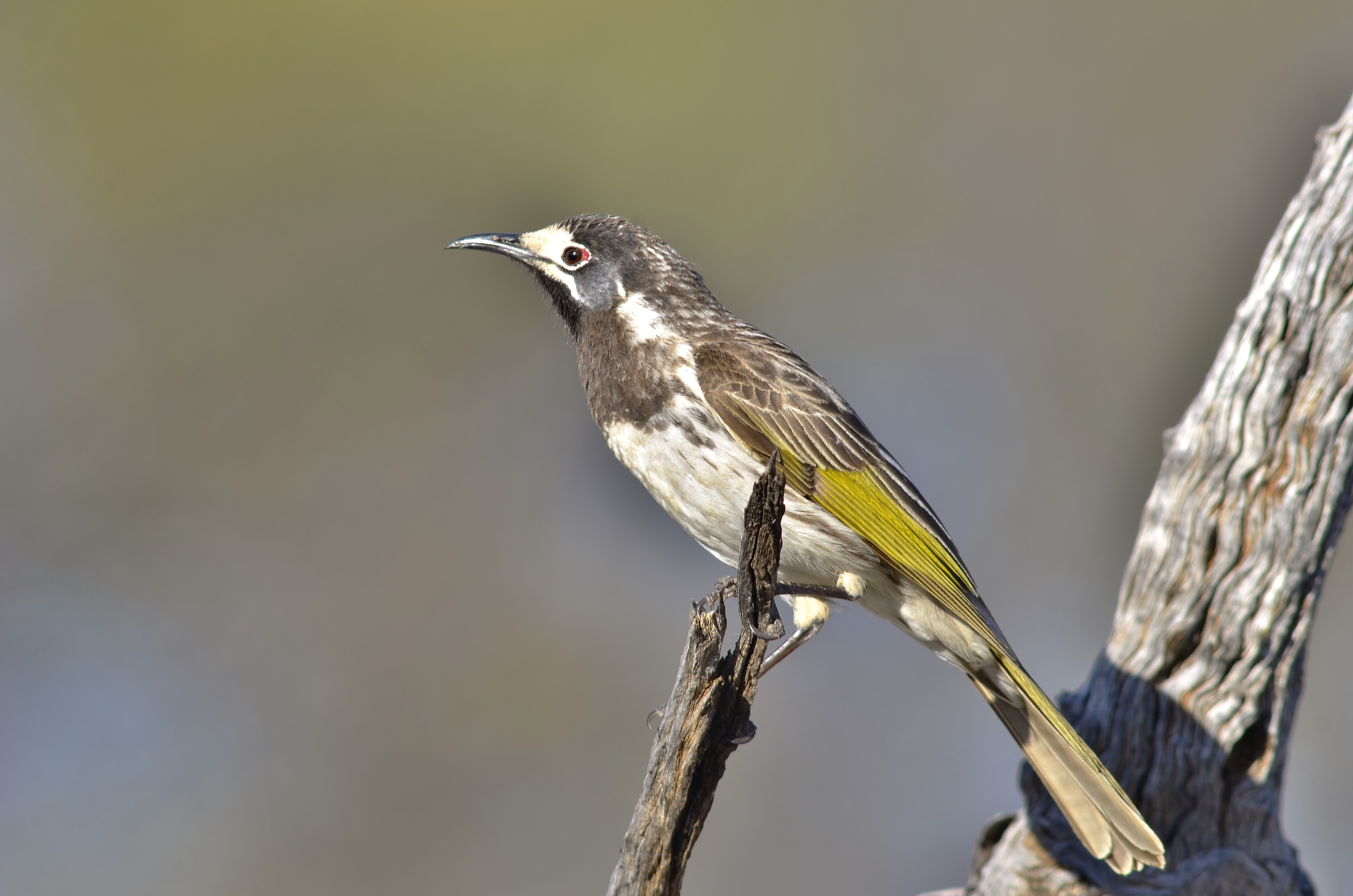
White-fronted honeyeater resting

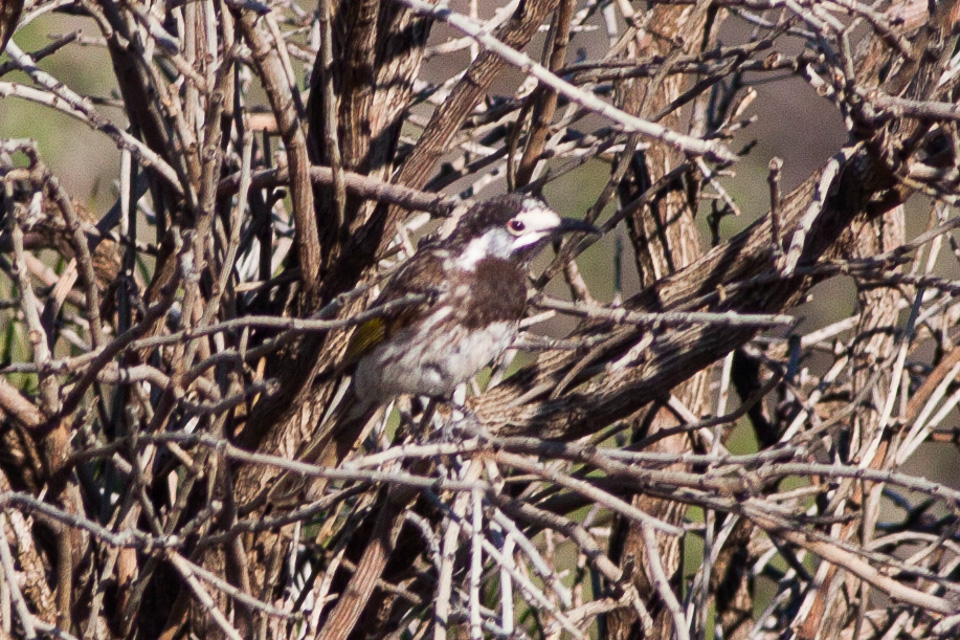
The ability for white-fronted honeyeaters to blend in with their surroundings via camouflage.
