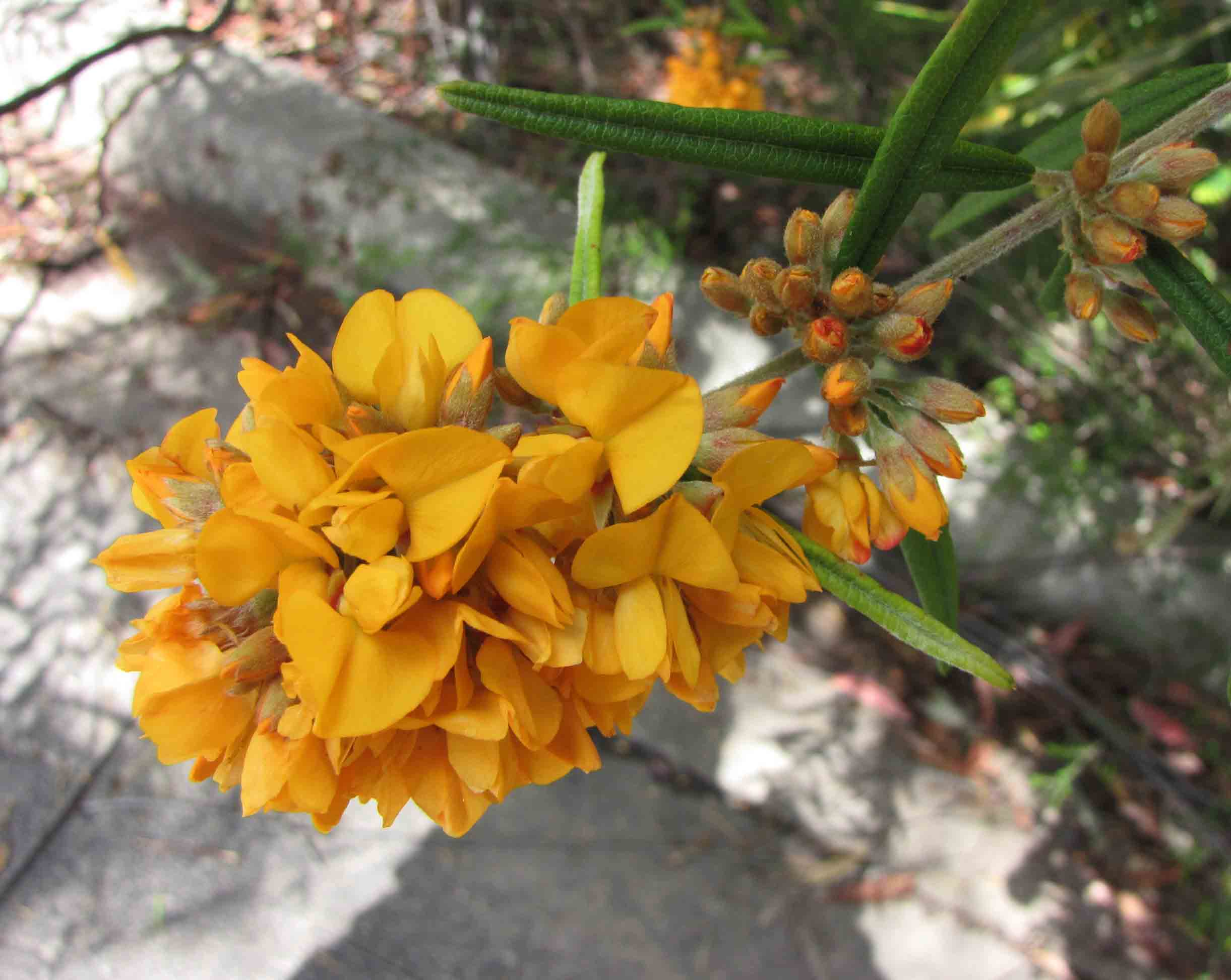
- In the ANBG

Scientific classification
- Kingdom: Plantae
- Clade: Embryophytes
- Clade: Tracheophytes
- Clade: Angiosperms
- Clade: Eudicots
- Clade: Rosids
- Order: Fabales
- Family: Fabaceae
- Subfamily: Faboideae
- Genus: Oxylobium
- Species: O. robustum

Binomial name
- Oxylobium robustum Joy Thomps.

= Oxylobium robustum =

Tree shaggy pea

Species of flowering plant

Oxylobium robustum, commonly known as tree shaggy pea, is a species of flowering plant in the family Fabaceae and is endemic to eastern Australia. It is a shrub or small tree with linear to narrowly lance-shaped leaves with a sharp point, and yellow-orange flowers in racemes.

== Description ==
Oxylobium robustum is a shrub or small tree that usually grows to a height of up to 3 m (9.8 ft), and has stems with woolly yellow or white hairs. The leaves are usually arranged in whorls and sometimes in opposite pairs, and are linear to lance-shaped, 25–80 mm (0.98–3.15 in) long and 1–3 mm (0.039–0.118 in) wide, with a sharp point on the end, and the sides curved down. The flowers are borne in racemes in leaf axils and on the ends of branches, with lance-shaped bracts and linear bracteoles at the base. The sepals are about 7 mm (0.28 in) long and the petals are yellow-orange and 8–12 mm (0.31–0.47 in) long. Flowering occurs from late winter to early summer, and the seed pods are about 7–10 mm (0.28–0.39 in) long, with a beaked tip and covered with soft hairs.

== Taxonomy ==
Oxylobium robustum was first formally described in 1958 by Joy Thompson and the description was published in the Proceedings of the Linnean Society of New South Wales from specimens collected by William Baeuerlen near Byron Bay in 1896.

== Distribution and habitat ==
Tree shaggy pea grows in forest and heath from south-east Queensland to Newcastle in eastern New South Wales.

== Use in horticulture ==
Oxylobium robustum can be propagated from scarified seed or cuttings and will grow in moist, well-drained soils in full sun or light shade.
