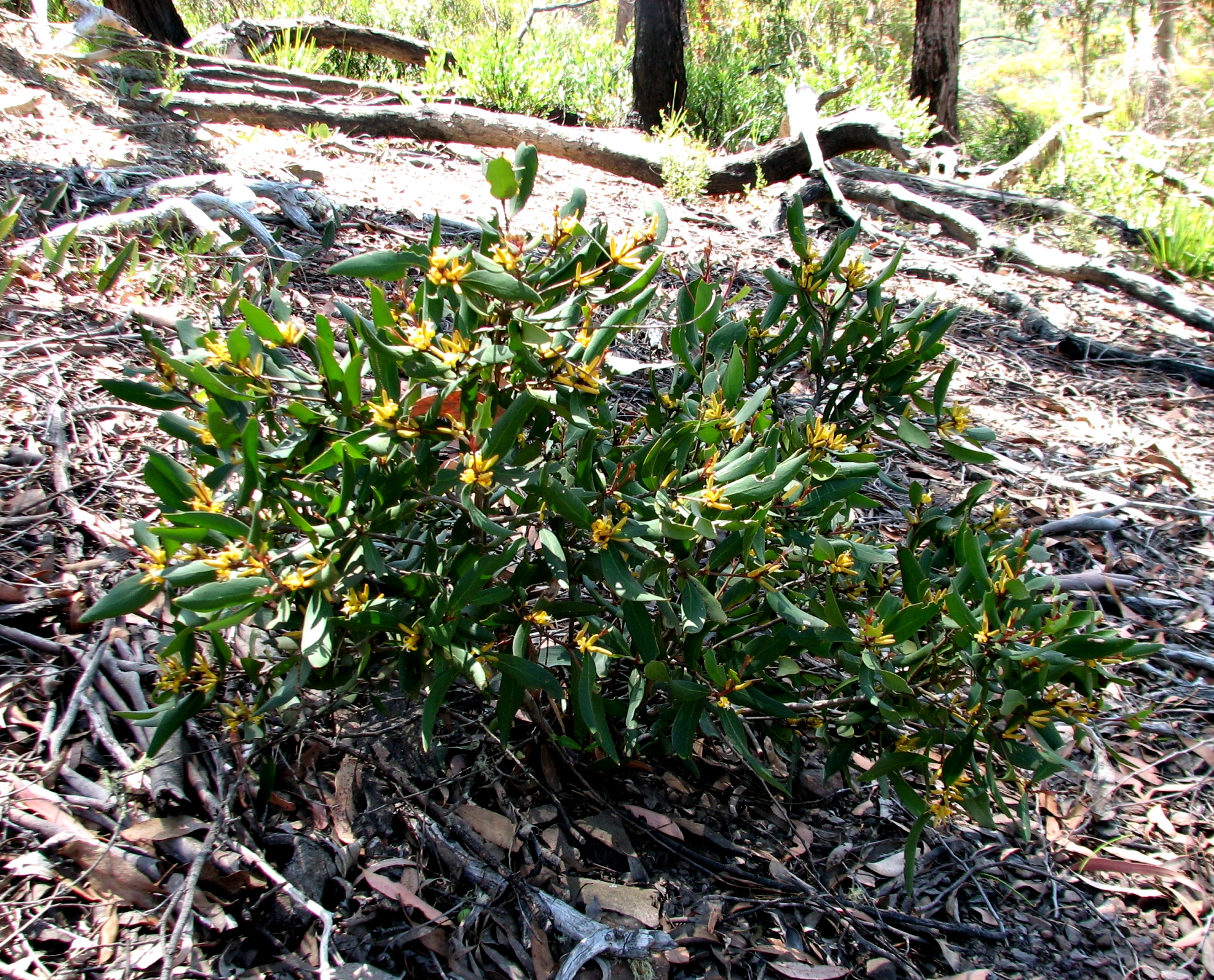

Scientific classification
- Kingdom: Plantae
- Clade: Tracheophytes
- Clade: Angiosperms
- Clade: Eudicots
- Order: Proteales
- Family: Proteaceae
- Genus: Persoonia
- Species: P. confertiflora

Binomial name
- Persoonia confertiflora Benth.
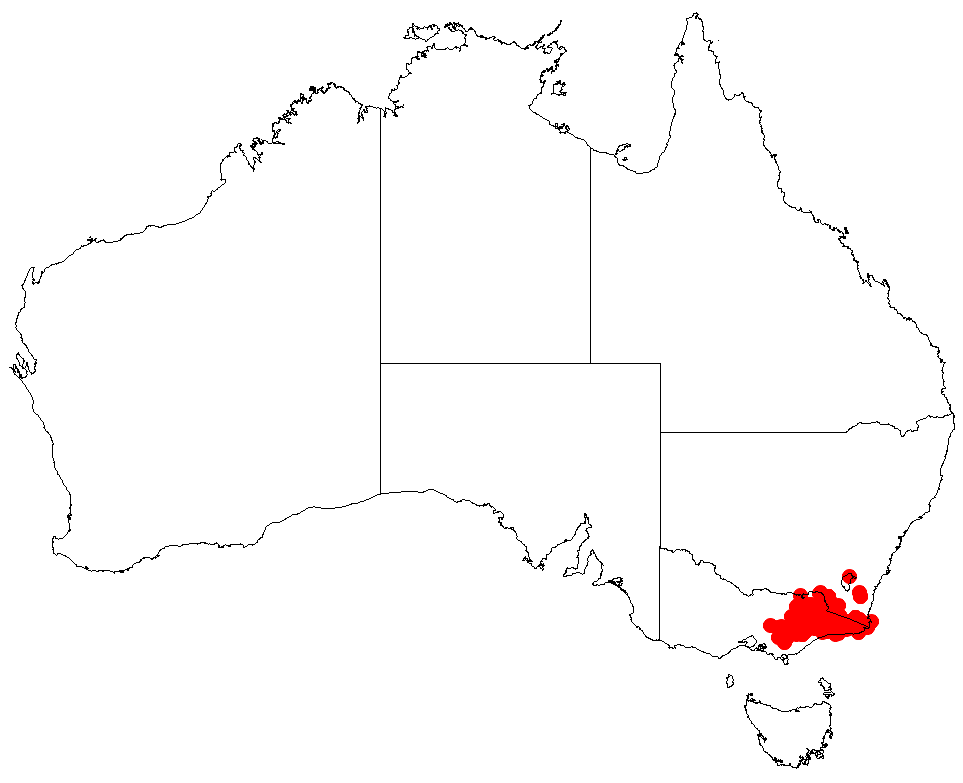
- Occurrence data downloaded from AVH

Synonyms
- Linkia confertiflora (Benth.) Kuntze

= Persoonia confertiflora =

Cluster-flower geebung

Species of flowering plant

Persoonia confertiflora, commonly known as cluster-flower geebung, is a species of flowering plant in the family Proteaceae and is endemic to south-eastern Australia. It is an erect to low-lying shrub with hairy young branches, egg-shaped to narrow elliptic leaves, and hairy yellow flowers borne on leaf axils or on the ends of short branches.

== Description ==
Persoonia confertiflora is an erect to low-lying shrub that typically grows to a height of 0.5–2 m (1 ft 8 in – 6 ft 7 in) with branches and leaves that are covered with light brown to rust-coloured hairs when young. The leaves are usually arranged in opposite pairs, egg-shaped to narrow elliptic or lance-shaped, 3–90 mm (0.12–3.54 in) long and 13–30 mm (0.51–1.18 in) wide. The flowers are arranged in clusters in leaf axils or on the ends of branchlets that do not continue growth after flowering. Each flower is on an erect, hairy pedicel 1–2 mm (0.039–0.079 in) long, the tepals 12–14 mm (0.47–0.55 in) long and hairy on the outside with a short spine on the tip, the anthers white. Flowering occurs from November to February and the fruit is an oval drupe about 18 mm (0.71 in) long and 14 mm (0.55 in) wide, that is green at first, later purplish.

== Taxonomy ==
Persoonia confertiflora was first formally described in 1870 by George Bentham in the fifth volume of Flora Australiensis.

== Distribution and habitat ==
Cluster-flower geebung grows in woodland and forest south from near Mount Kosciuszko in New South Wales to eastern Victoria.
