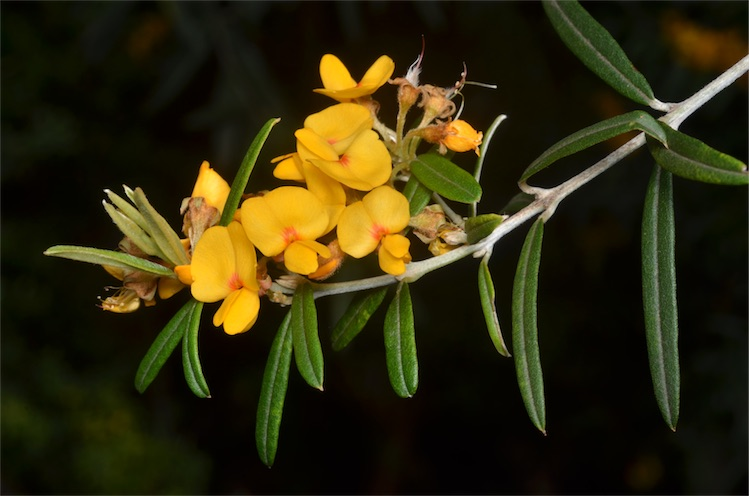

Scientific classification
- Kingdom: Plantae
- Clade: Embryophytes
- Clade: Tracheophytes
- Clade: Angiosperms
- Clade: Eudicots
- Clade: Rosids
- Order: Fabales
- Family: Fabaceae
- Subfamily: Faboideae
- Genus: Oxylobium
- Species: O. arborescens

Binomial name
- Oxylobium arborescens R.Br.

= Oxylobium arborescens =

Tall shaggy-pea

Species of legume

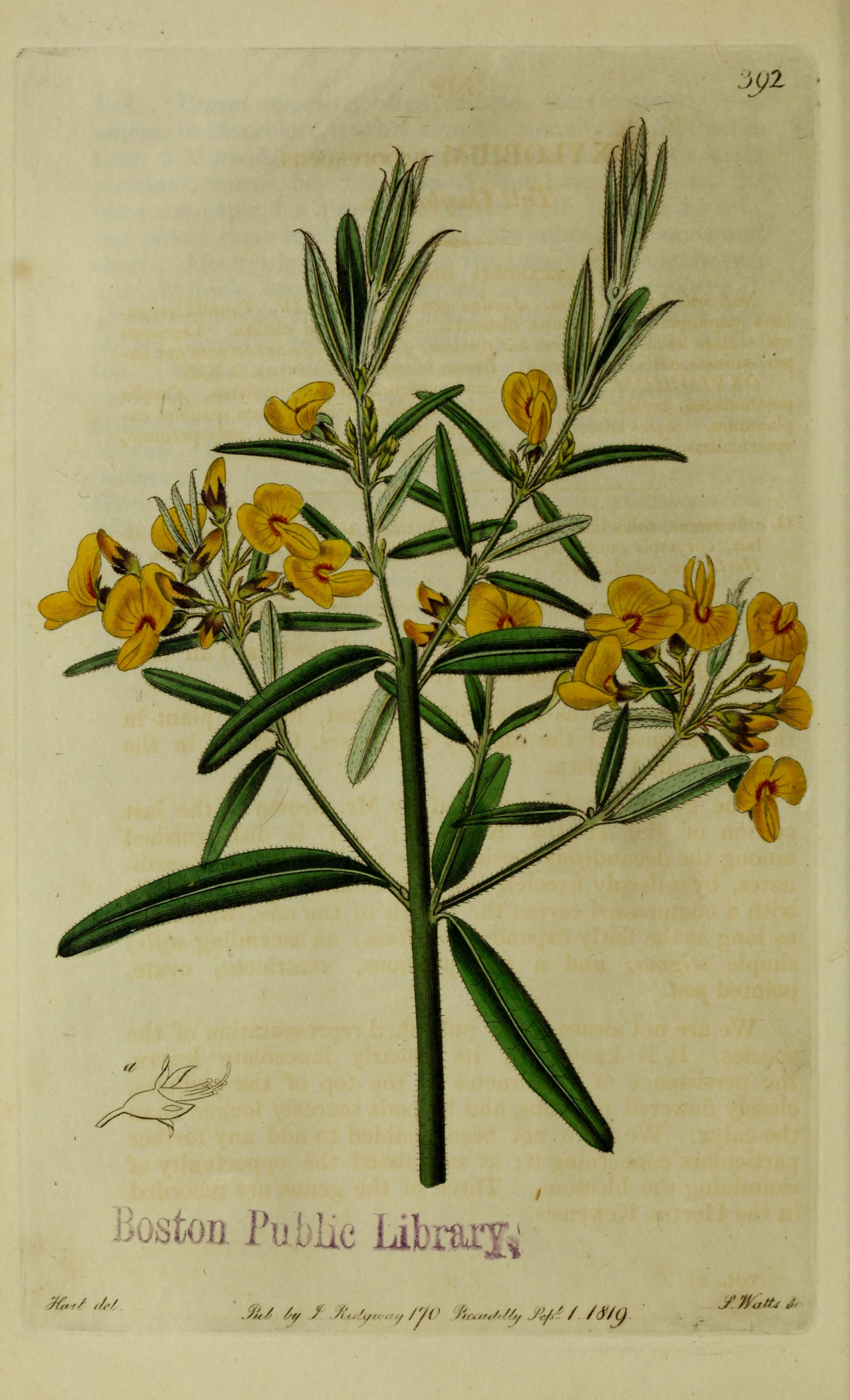
Illustration from the The Botanical Register

Oxylobium arborescens, commonly known as the tall shaggy-pea, is a species of flowering shrub to small tree in the family Fabaceae and is endemic to south-eastern Australia. It has elliptic dark green leaves and yellow pea flowers.

== Description ==
Oxylobium arborescens is an upright shrub to 5 m (16 ft) high with stems covered in soft, silky hairs. The dark green leaves may be in irregular whorls of three or arranged opposite, linear, narrowly elliptic or oblong, usually 3–5 cm (1.2–2.0 in) long, 5–8 mm (0.20–0.31 in) wide, petiole about 4 mm (0.16 in) long, margins rolled under. The upper surface is covered in warty protuberances, smooth with veins, underside covered in soft, matted hairs, and tapering to a sharp, short point. The yellow flowers are in short racemes borne at the end of branches or in the leaf axils. The bracts are lance shaped and short, bracteoles linear and 3–4 mm (0.12–0.16 in) long. The flower corolla 8–10 mm (0.31–0.39 in) long, yellow with red markings and covered with short, soft hairs on a pedicel about 5 mm (0.20 in) long, standard almost flat and circular, yellow with a reddish centre and notched at the apex. The seed pod is 6–10 mm (0.24–0.39 in) long, egg-shaped, sometimes compressed, hairy and tapering to a point. Flowering occurs in spring and summer.

== Taxonomy ==
Oxylobium arborescens was first formally described in 1811 by Robert Brown and the description was published in Hortus Kewensis. The specific epithet (arborescens) means "tending to a tree-like form".

== Distribution and habitat ==
Tall shaggy-pea is an uncommon shrub growing in gullies and sheltered forests mostly on ranges.
