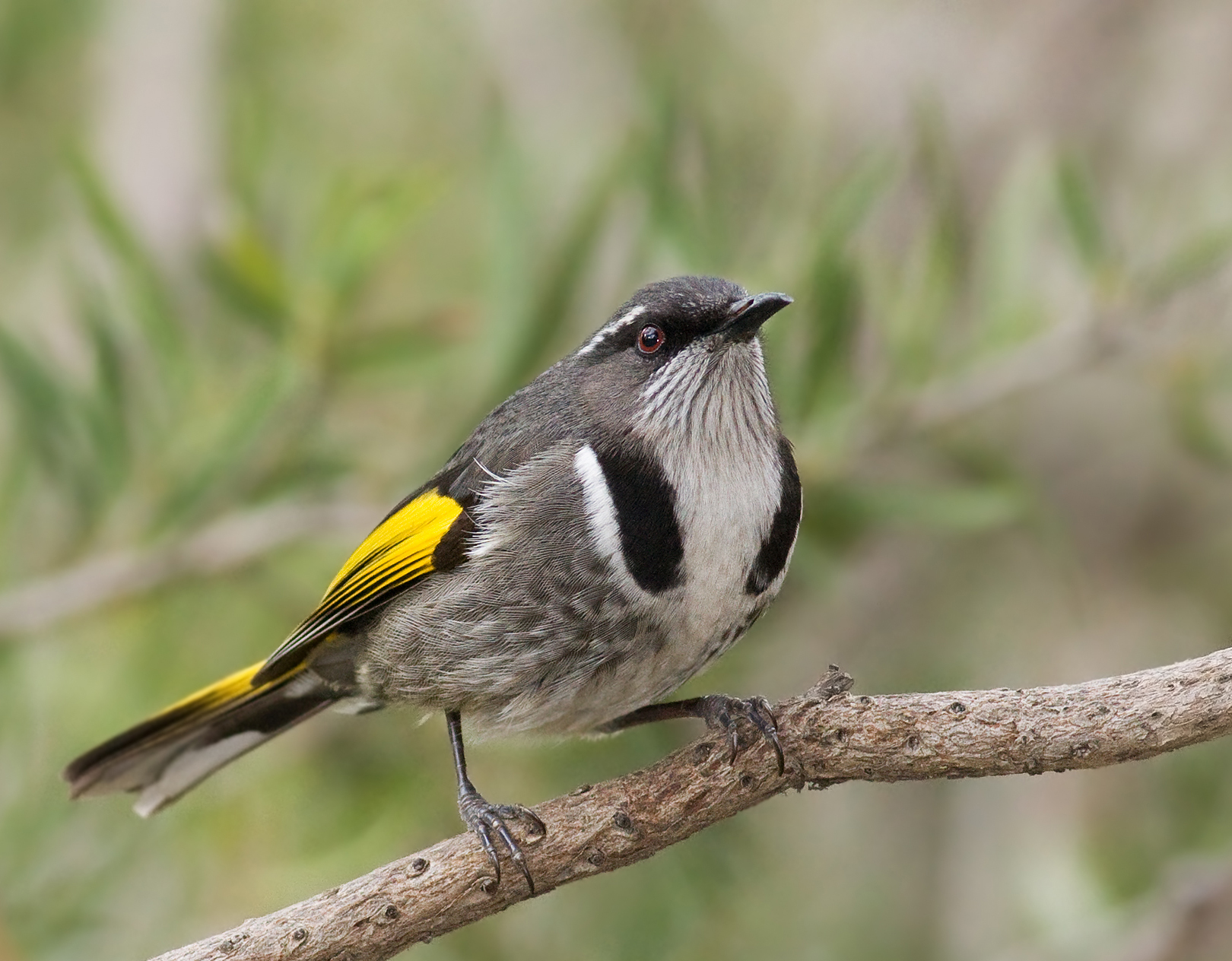
- Crescent honeyeater (Phylidonyris pyrrhoptera)

Scientific classification
- Kingdom: Animalia
- Phylum: Chordata
- Class: Aves
- Order: Passeriformes
- Family: Meliphagidae
- Genus: Phylidonyris; Lesson, 1830

Type species
- Certhia novaehollandiae Latham, 1790

= Phylidonyris =

Genus of birds

Phylidonyris is a genus of birds in the honeyeater family that are endemic to Australia.

== Taxonomy ==
The genus Phylidonyris was introduced in 1830 by the French naturalist René Lesson to accommodate a single species, Certhia novaehollandiae Latham, 1790, now the New Holland honeyeater (Phylidonyris novaehollandiae). The generic name Phylidonyris combines the term Phylédon or Philédon, used by the French naturalist Georges Cuvier in 1817 for the friarbirds (now placed in the genus Philemon), with Cinnyris (Cuvier, 1816) for the sunbirds.

The genus contains the following three species:

Image	Scientific name	Common name	Distribution
	Phylidonyris novaehollandiae	New Holland honeyeater	southern Australia
	Phylidonyris niger	White-cheeked honeyeater	east coast and the south-west corner of Australia
	Phylidonyris pyrrhopterus	Crescent honeyeater	southeastern Australia
