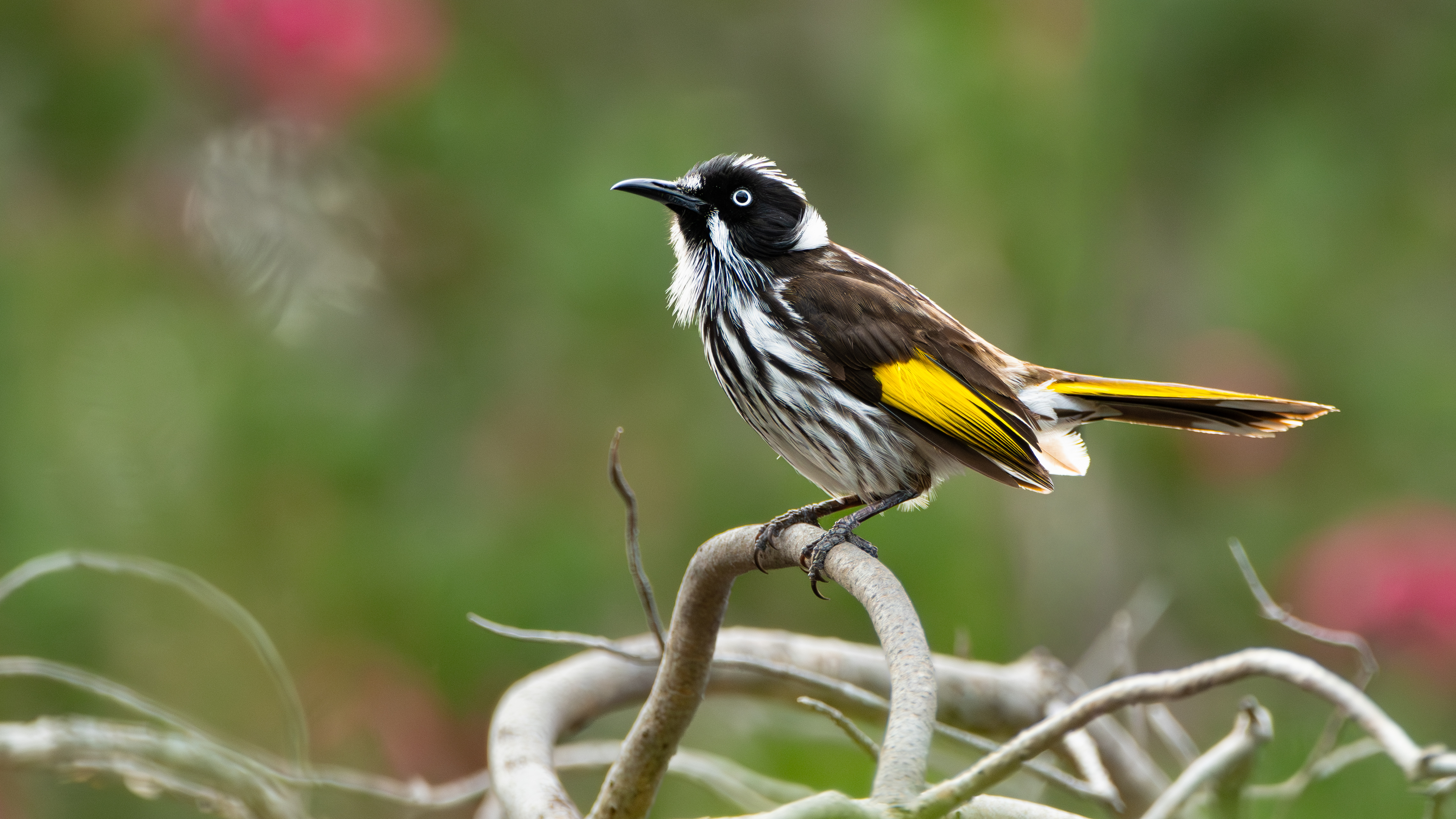
- New Holland honeyeater perched, Perth Hills, Western Australia

Conservation status
- Least Concern (IUCN 3.1)

Scientific classification
- Kingdom: Animalia
- Phylum: Chordata
- Class: Aves
- Order: Passeriformes
- Family: Meliphagidae
- Genus: Phylidonyris
- Species: P. novaehollandiae

Binomial name
- Phylidonyris novaehollandiae (Latham, 1790)
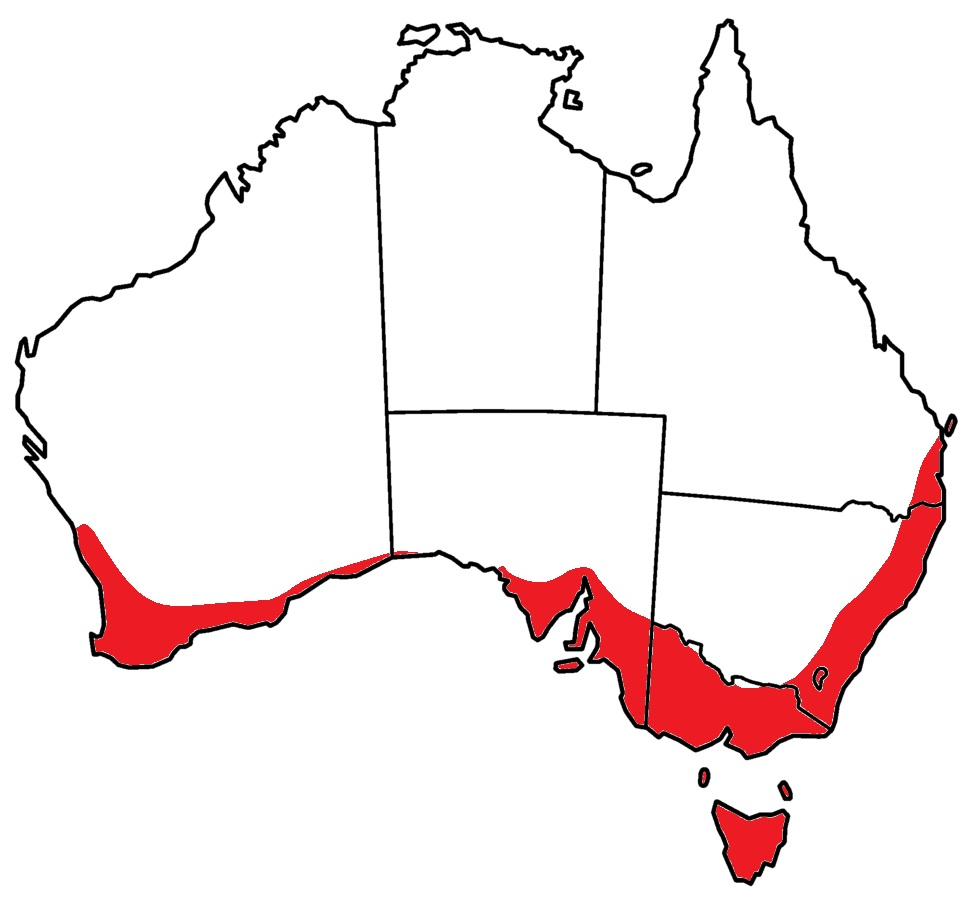
- Distribution of the New Holland honeyeater

= New Holland honeyeater =

Species of bird

The New Holland honeyeater (Phylidonyris novaehollandiae) is a honeyeater species found throughout southern Australia. It was among the first birds to be scientifically described in Australia, and was initially named Certhia novaehollandiae.

== Taxonomy ==
The New Holland honeyeater was formally described in 1790 by the English ornithologist John Latham. He placed it with the tree creepers in the genus Certhia and coined the binomial name Certhia novaehollandiae. Latham based his account on the "New Holland Creeper" that had been described and illustrated by the Irish surgeon John White in his Journal of a Voyage to New South Wales. The New Holland honeyeater is now one of three species placed in the genus Phylidonyris that was introduced in 1830 by René Lesson.

Five subspecies are recognised:

- P. n. novaehollandiae (Latham, 1790) – southeast Queensland to southeast South Australia (central south, southeast Australia)
- P. n. caudatus Salomonsen, 1966 – Bass Strait islands (southeast Australia)
- P. n. canescens (Latham, 1790) – Tasmania (southeast Australia)
- P. n. campbelli (Mathews, 1923) – Kangaroo Island (off central south Southern Australia; central south Australia)
- P. n. longirostris (Gould, 1846) – southwest Western Australia (southwest Australia)

== Description ==
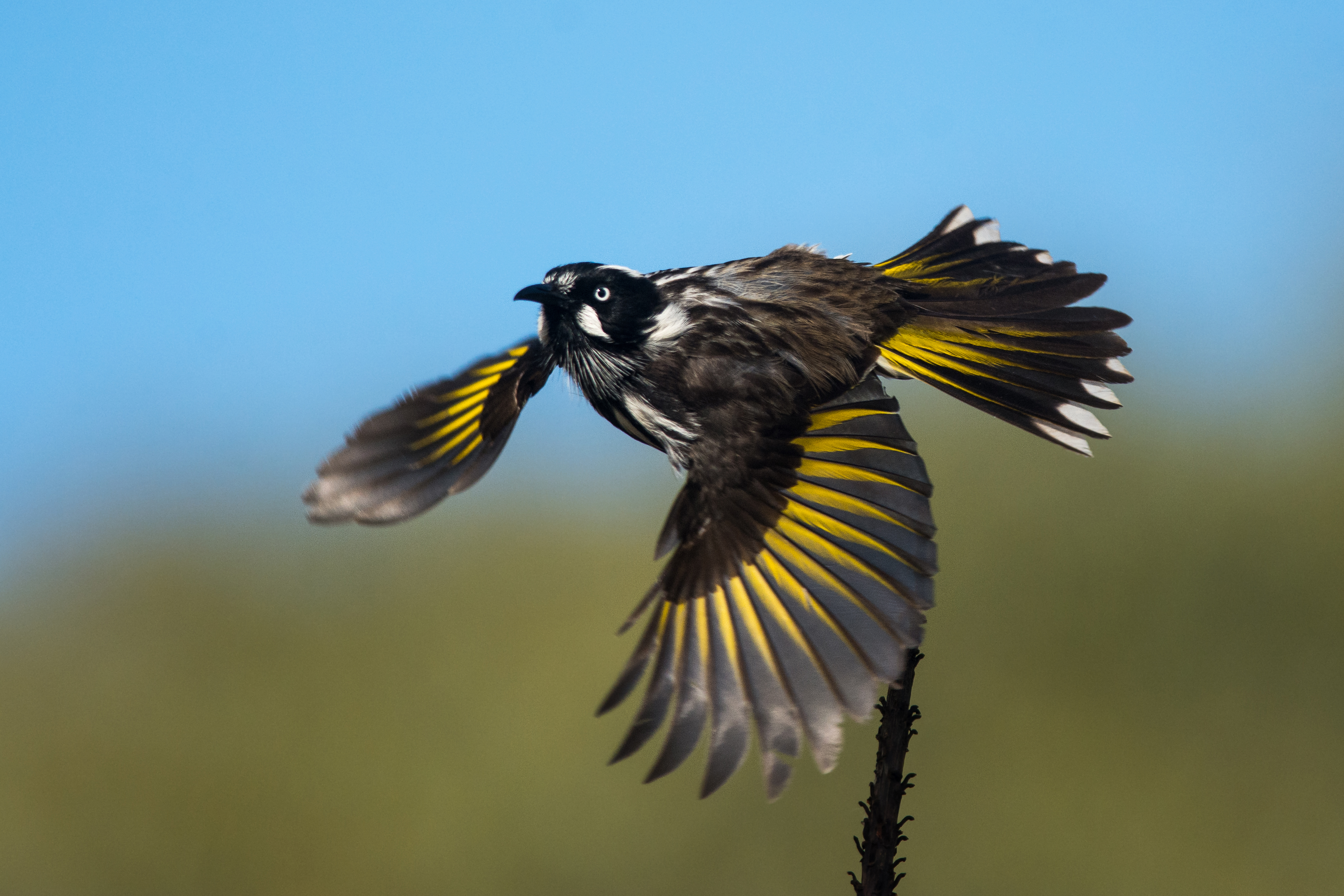
A New Holland Honeyeater in flight

The bird is around 18 cm (7.1 in) long and is mainly black, with a white iris, white facial tufts and yellow margins on its wing and tail feathers. It is a very active bird and rarely sits long enough to give an extended view. When danger approaches a New Holland honeyeater, such as a bird of prey, a group of honeyeaters will form together and give a warning call. Sexes are similar in looks with the exception that females are, on average, slightly smaller. Young New Holland honeyeaters (<1 year old) have similar colouring but have grey eyes and a yellow gape and 'whiskers' near the nares. They appear to be a socially monogamous bird with no sign of co-operative breeding, but this observation is yet to be examined.

== Behaviour ==
=== Breeding ===
The breeding behaviour of the New Holland honeyeater has been relatively well documented. In southern and eastern Australia, breeding commonly occurs during autumn and spring, although certain coastal populations may breed at any time of the year given suitable conditions, including sufficient food and absence of adverse weather. In Western Australia, New Holland honeyeaters have been observed to breed once annually from July to November, when nectar is abundant.

In breeding territories, males spend a large proportion of their time defending the nest and food resources, while the females invest a large proportion of their time in reproductive labour including nest construction, incubation, and a majority of the nestling care. However, these roles are not completely strict (Lambert and Oorebeek, observation). It is also common for females to utilise food resources that are in close proximity to the nest, while males venture further afield, toward the outskirts of the territory.

=== Diet ===
New Holland honeyeaters obtain most of their carbohydrate requirements from the nectar of flowers. Consequently, they are key pollinators of many flowering plant species, many of which are endemic to Australia, such as Banksia, Hakea, Xanthorrhoea, and Acacia. New Holland honeyeaters may also consume honeydew, a sugary secretion produced by members of the family Psyllidae. Despite feeding primarily on nectar, New Holland honeyeaters are not strictly nectarivorous. Nectar does not contain protein, so New Holland honeyeaters must supplement their diet with invertebrates, such as spiders and insects that are rich in protein. They sometimes feed alone but usually gather in groups.

== Gallery ==
New Holland honeyeater nest, eggs and chicks, Western Australia

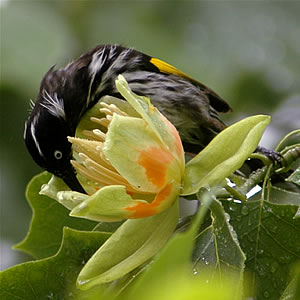
New Holland honeyeater feeding, 2005

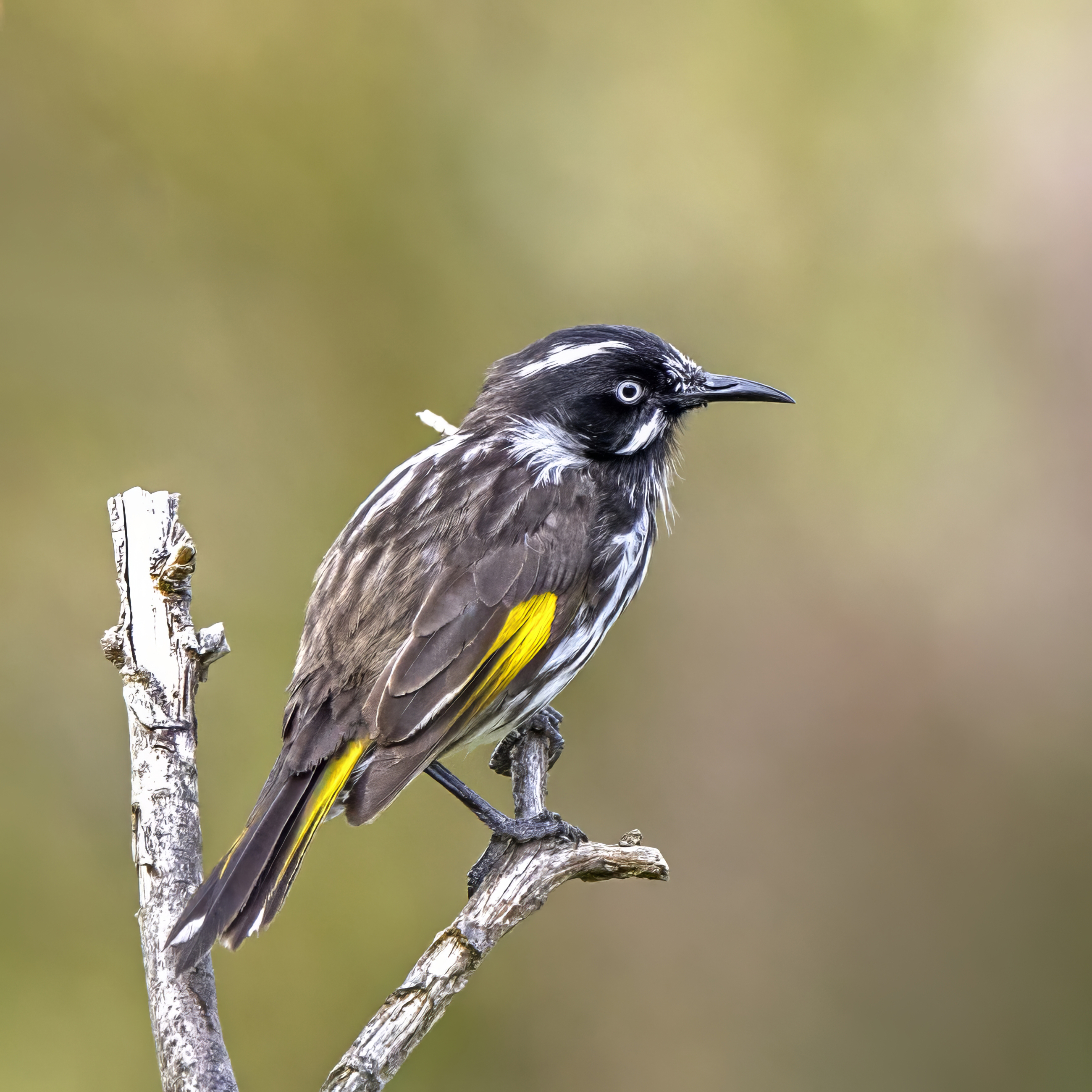
P. n. canescens, Tasmania

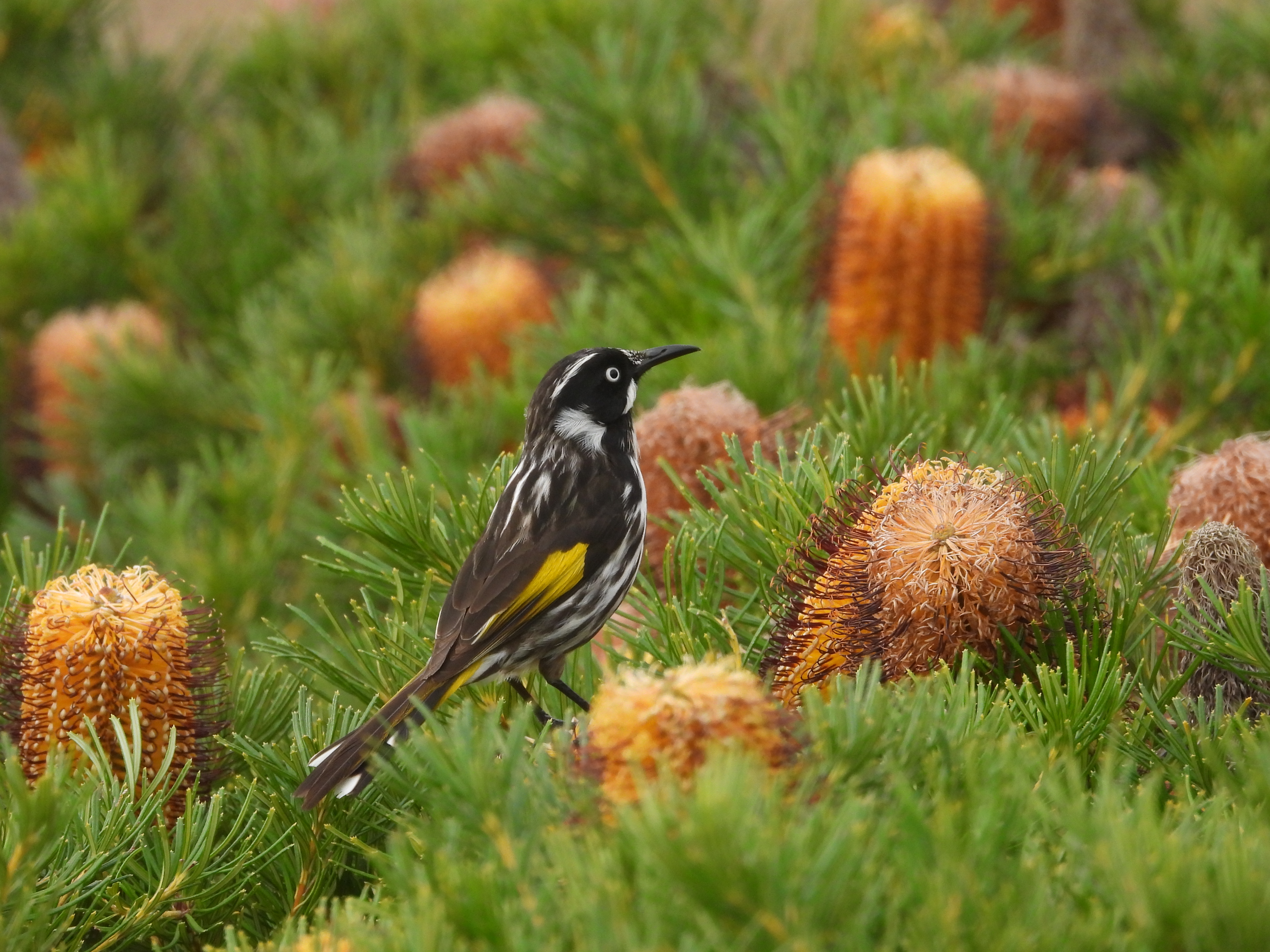
New Holland Honeyeater in Banksia, Cranbourne Botanical gardens
