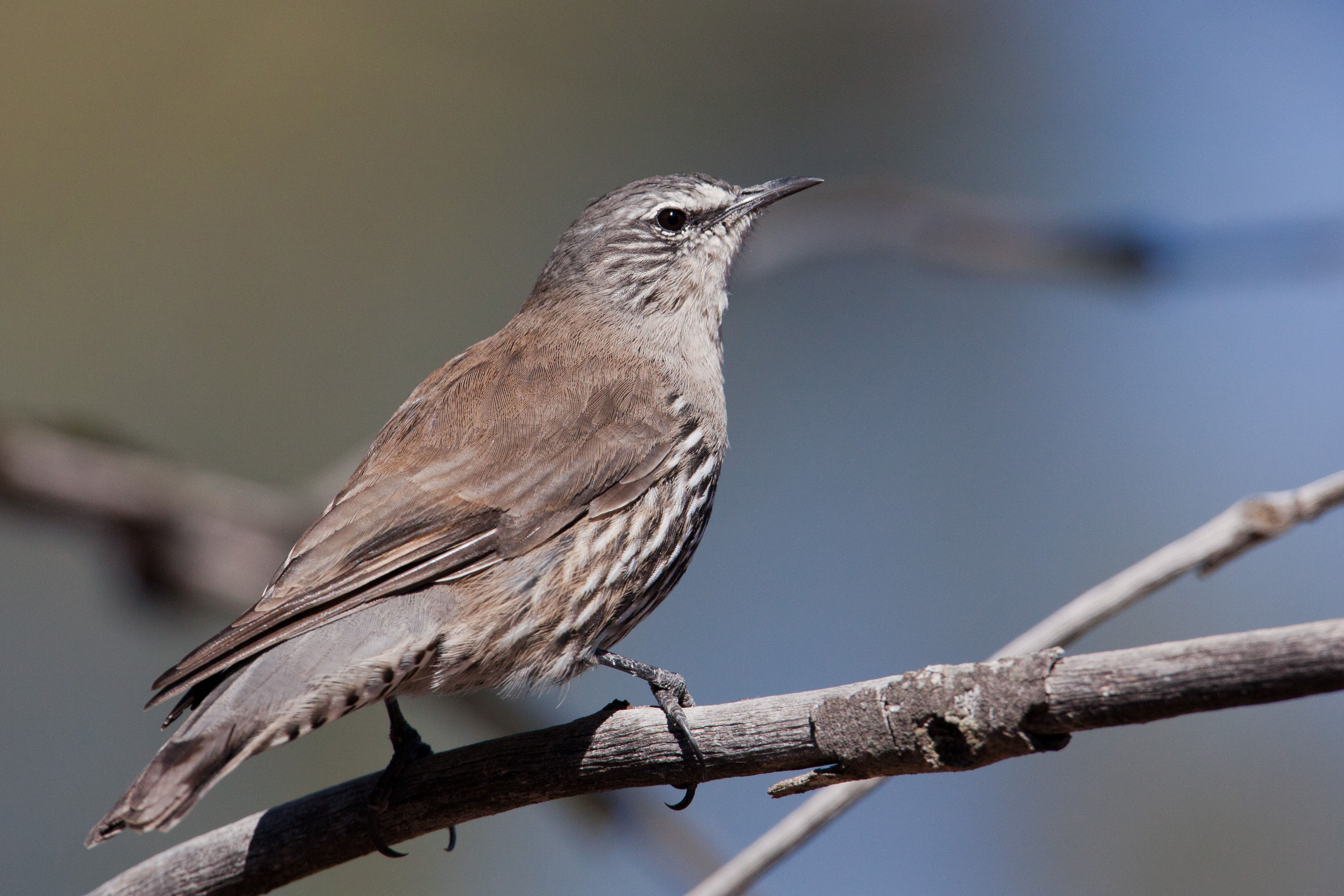

Conservation status
- Least Concern (IUCN 3.1)

Scientific classification
- Kingdom: Animalia
- Phylum: Chordata
- Class: Aves
- Order: Passeriformes
- Family: Climacteridae
- Genus: Climacteris
- Species: C. affinis

Binomial name
- Climacteris affinis Blyth, 1863
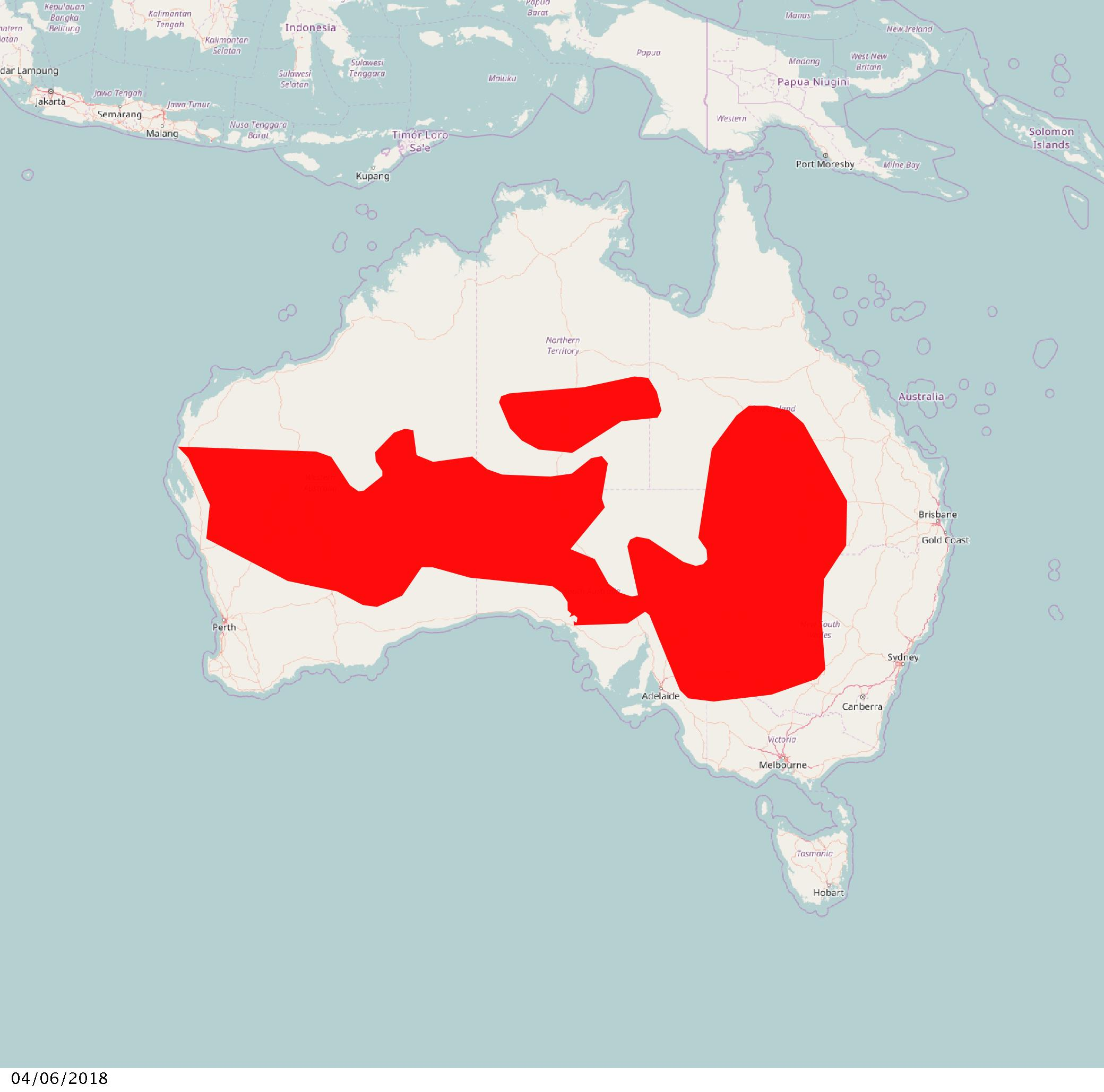
- Distribution of Climacteris affinis in red

= White-browed treecreeper =

Species of bird

The white-browed treecreeper (Climacteris affinis) is the smallest of the Australo-papuan treecreepers and sole family member adapted to arid environments. The species foraging strategy involves climbing the trunks of trees in search of invertebrate prey on and under bark. Although some populations within the species range have declined, the species IUCN conservation status is of Least Concern.

Eulo, SW Queensland, Australia

== Taxonomy and evolution ==
The white-browed treecreeper (Climacteris affinis) is one of 7 species of Australo-Papuan endemic treecreepers (Family: Climacteridae). Prior to the development of molecular diagnostic techniques, the relationship of Climacteridae to other avian families was long debated. Phylogenetic analysis has since revealed the family to be most closely related to bowerbirds and catbirds (Family: Ptilonorhynchidae). Together these two families are thought to represent one of the most ancient lineages of 'songbirds' (oscines, suborder Passeri), diverging early during the rise and radiation of oscines in Australia. The further split between Climacteridae and Ptilonorhynchidae is estimated to have occurred 58.7-35.2 million years ago.

Within Climacteridae, two genera are recognised Climacteris and Cormobates. Molecular analysis estimates the divergence between genera to have occurred during the Eocene-early-Miocene period. This estimate is further supported by the recovery of fossils referred to both genera within early Miocene deposits in Queensland, Australia. These ancient fossils all exhibit morphological features associated with scansorial (tree-trunk climbing), the primary mode of locomotion used during foraging by all extant species. The presence of these features suggest this foraging strategy to have evolved early within the family's evolutionary history.

The genus name 'Climacteris' is derived from the Greek term meaning 'the rung of a ladder', and refers to the groups tree-trunk climbing habits. The species name 'affinis', Latin for 'allied', refers to the species resemblance to the red-browed treecreeper (Climacteris erythrops).

=== Subspecies ===
Two subspecies are recognised:

- C. a. affinis Blyth, 1863 – Australia, east of Spencer Gulf (rump uppertail coverts and tail grey)
- C. a. superciliosus North, 1895 – Australia, west of Spencer Gulf (rump, uppertail coverts and tail brown)

== Description and field identification ==
The white-browed treecreeper is 14–16 cm in length, has a wingspan of 22 cm and weighs 21gm. Adult male plumage is mostly dark grey above (crown, neck, rump and uppertail) excluding the mantle and scapulars of which are brown and black sub-terminal tail-band. Facial plumage includes black lores, white tapered eyebrow and black and white streaked ear-coverts. The chin is white and throat brownish grey. The upper breast is grey and lower breast, belly, flanks and vent streaked black and white. Undertail coverts are barred black and white. Females are similar to males but with rufous stripe bordering the upper edge of the eyebrow and dull white streaking, tinged rufous, on the centre of the upper breast. In both sexes the bill is black, around 1.5–2 cm long and is relatively straight and slender. The iris is dark brown and legs and feet black. Juveniles differ from adults with pale grey bill and both facial patterning and ear-covert streaking duller and less distinct.

The white-browed treecreeper has moderately long wedge shaped wings and square tail. Flight pattern over longer distances is undulated, involving brief bursts of flapping within long glides, during which a buff wingbar is visible.

=== Similar species ===
The brown treecreeper (Climacteris picumnus) is similar in appearance to the white-browed treecreeper; however, the brown treecreeper's breast streaks are duller and ear-covert streaking confined to rear coverts. In addition, the brown treecreeper's short shrill 'peep' calls differ greatly to that of the white-browed treecreeper's long 'prrrpt' insect-like calls.

== Distribution and habitat ==
White-browed treecreepers inhabit arid and semi-arid regions across southern Australia, excluding Tasmania. The two subspecies ranges do not overlap, C. a. affinis found east of the Spencer Gulf and C. a. superciliosus to the west. White-browed Treecreepers inhabit a range of woodland and shrubland communities, dominated by either Acacia, Casuarina or Callitris species, with both dense and open understory's.

White-browed treecreepers are sedentary, pairs or groups actively defending relatively large territories (averaging 8.4 hectares in some regions) throughout the year.

== Ecology ==
=== Feeding ===
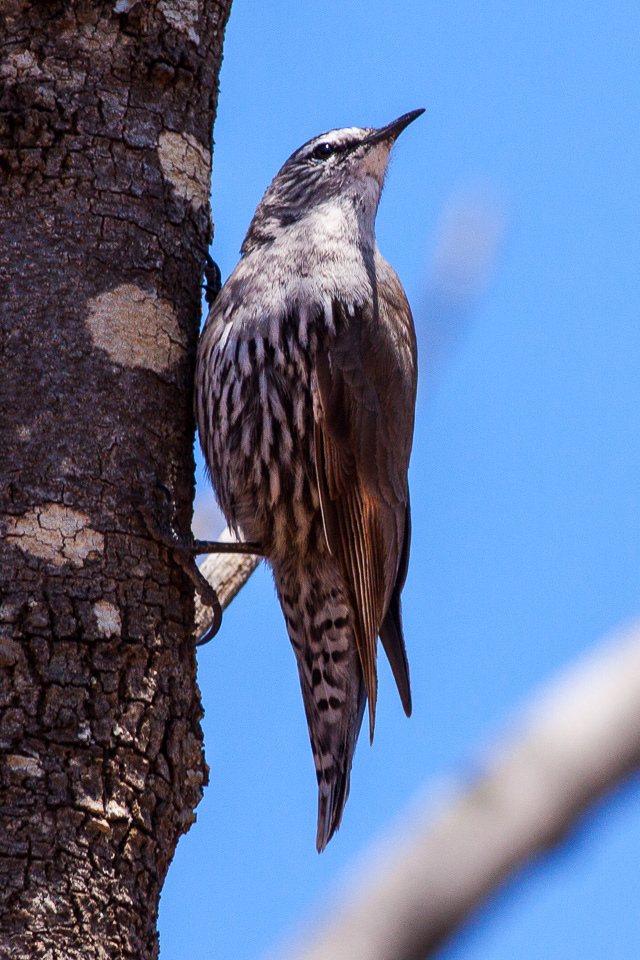
White-browed treecreeper climbing tree. Photo by Ron Knight

The white-browed treecreeper is a scansorial (tree-trunk climbing) bark-foraging specialist, feeding upon a range of invertebrates (predominantly ants) gathered from on and beneath the bark of tree trunks and branches. The climbing technique employed by the species is described as 'inching' by which the lower foot is lifted and brought to the level of the upper foot prior to the upper being moved higher. Such a technique differs from some other scansorial birds which lift their feet from the substrate simultaneously in a hopping or hitching fashion. Once white-browed treecreepers reach the uppermost portions of a tree they glide down to a lower position on a nearby tree to recommence climbing. The species also frequently forages on the ground among logs and leaf litter.

White-browed treecreepers forage alone, in small family groups or during winter within mixed-species assemblages comprising other insectivores.

=== Feeding adaptations ===
White-browed treecreepers exhibit a number of morphological traits, primarily of the legs, feet and toes, thought to represent scansorial bark-foraging adaptations. Such traits include increased toe length (increasing the span of the foot), long strongly curved claws (assisting the gripping of substrates), increased syndactyly of the front toes and reduced pads on the sole of the foot (reducing contact of the plantar surface of the foot to the substrate). Additionally, Climacteris species are able to move the hind toe independently to that of the front toes due to a lack of some ligament within the foot. This enables finer adjustments of footings to be made.

=== Breeding ===
White-browed treecreepers' breeding season varies across its range, commencing as early as July in the western parts of its range to August in the east, and continuing until November. White-browed treecreepers breed both as unassisted simple pairs or in cooperatively breeding units consisting of a breeding pair and 1-3 male offspring from previous years. Non-breeding male 'helpers' provide assistance with all nesting related activities, other than incubation and brooding (conducted by the female alone).

White-browed treecreepers build shallow saucer-shaped nests within tree hollows, made of bark fibres, grass, twigs and branchlets and line the nest with feathers, fur, vegetable down and wool. The female lays a clutch of 1-3 pinkish-white eggs speckled reddish and purplish-brown, which she incubates for 17–18 days. Nestlings take approximately 25–26 days to fledge upon which they remain dependent on their parents and associated 'helpers' for food for up to 37 days. Although up to two broods may be raised per season white-browed treecreepers have low productivity, with an average of only 1.58 young fledged per breeding unit annually.

== Threats ==
Threats to the white-browed treecreeper include habitat loss and fragmentation due to land clearing. Such threats have resulted in population declines and range contractions within some regions including Victoria, Australia, within which the species is now listed as Threatened under state legislation. The white-browed treecreeper has also been recognised as a species highly exposed to the effects of climate change.

== Conservation status ==
White-browed treecreepers are not listed as threatened on the Australian Environment Protection and Biodiversity Conservation Act 1999. However, their conservation status varies from state to state within Australia. For example:

- The white-browed treecreeper is listed as threatened on the Victorian Flora and Fauna Guarantee Act (1988). Under this Act, an Action Statement for the recovery and future management of this species has been prepared.
- On the 2007 advisory list of threatened vertebrate fauna in Victoria, the white-browed treecreeper is listed as vulnerable.
