= Frederick Bulstrode Lawson Whitlock =

English ornithologist (1860–1953)

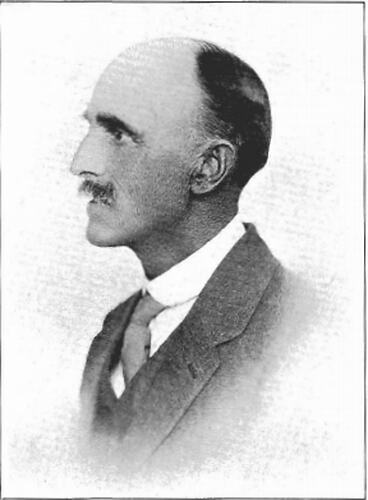
- Born: 3 June 1860
- Died: June 15, 1953 (aged 93)
- Occupations: ornithologist, entomologist, author
- Employer: Western Australian Museum Boola Bardip

Frederick Bulstrode Lawson Whitlock (1860-1953) was an ornithological writer and oölogist, active in England and across Western Australia.

The first years of his life, living in England, he became known as F.B. Whitlock. Later in life, in Australia, his name was mostly written as F.L. Whitlock, or F. Lawson Whitlock.

He is noted for his many expeditions to remote regions of Australia, collecting the eggs and nests of birds and recording their behaviour. His notes and specimens were often of little known or new bird populations, generating new names and descriptions. Whitlock's specimens and notes on Conopophila whitei, the grey honeyeater, are regarded as the last new species to be 'discovered' in the state.

== Biography ==
Frederick Bulstrode Lawson Whitlock was born 3 June 1860 in Nottingham, England, becoming interested in its natural history at an early age. He became a published ornithologist while still in England, studying the birds of Europe in the literature and field. He began a career as a bank manager in Nottingham, later robbing the safe and moving to Western Australia. A reward notice of one hundred pounds was issued with a photograph and description,

"… he has a shifty expression when talking. He is a clever bicyclist and a collector of birds and birds’ eggs, upon which he is a considerable authority".

Whitlock entered Australia through Fremantle port, and travelled to the goldfields north of Kalgoorlie. He was arrested by two police officers in "mysterious circumstances", one called Wilson and another, Robert Connell, who rose through the ranks to become a long-serving Western Australia Police Commissioner. The stolen money was not recorded as amongst his few belongings. After his capture at Kanowna, and his conviction and sentencing in England, he returned with his wife, Clara Ellen Neale-Whitlock, and daughter to Western Australia to continue his work in ornithology.

The significant contribution of F. Lawson Whitlock's works to the state's ornithology was noted in The West Australian, published on his ninetieth birthday, the item also links his ancestry to English parliamentarian Sir Bulstrode Whitelocke. Toward the end of his life Whitlock shifted his attention to entomology. His last contribution to ornithological literature concerned seabirds washed up to the nearby beach, collected where he had retired, at Bunbury, Western Australia. Whitlock died there on 15 June 1953.

== Works ==
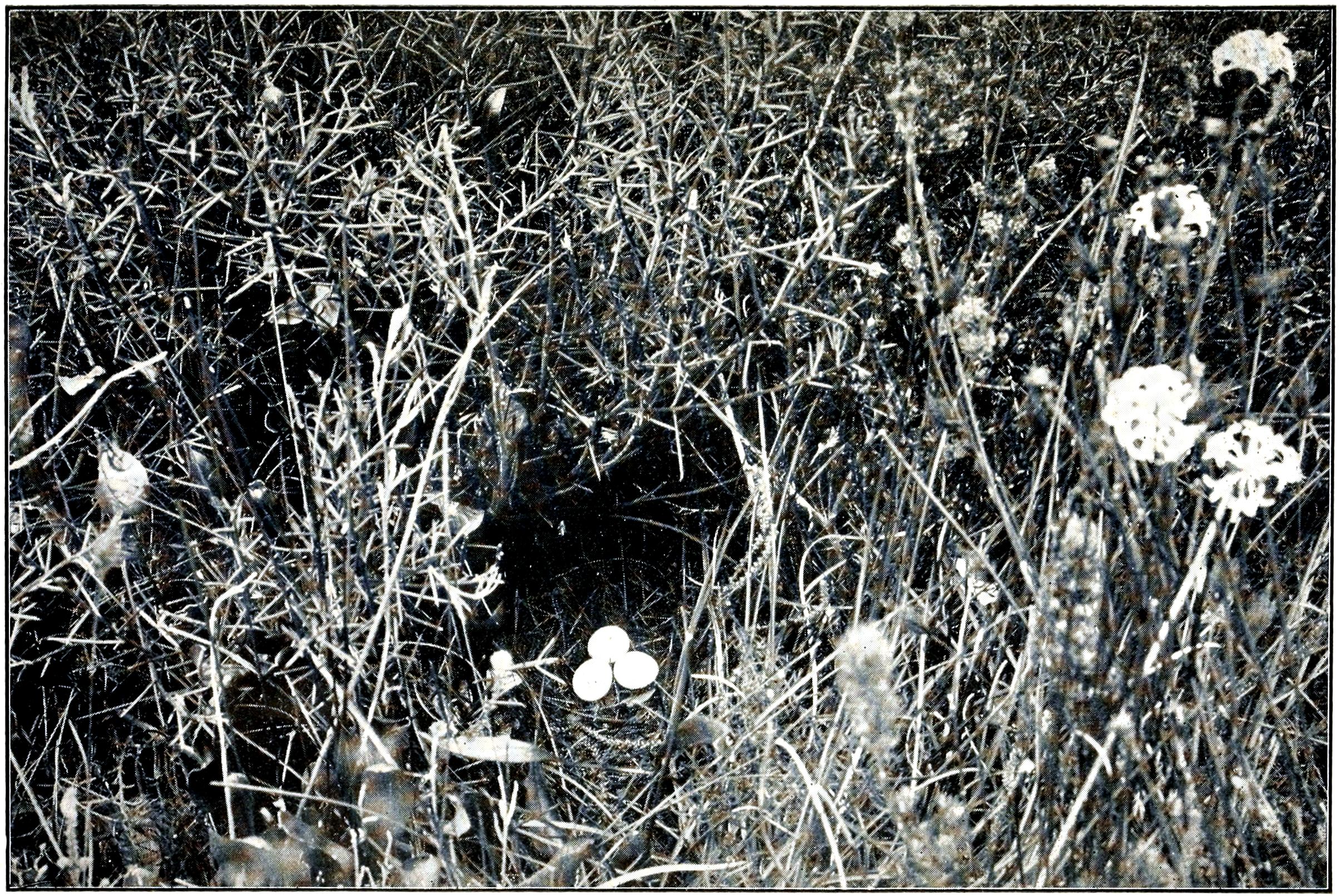
Photo of Western ground parrot nest and eggs. The Emu, 1913.

Whitlock had published a book before leaving England, The Birds of Derbyshire, with map and six illustrations (1893), supplemented with notes of a taxidermist and author, A.S. Hutchinson (active 1870s, died 1909).

Whitlock wrote over fifty articles for the Australian journal The Emu, sometimes illustrated with his photographs of bird's nests, eggs and their habitat. The journal's editor, H. M. Whittell, praised his contributions in The Emu on his eightieth birthday, and in a page given over to Whitlock's achievements in his ornithological history of the state, prefacing Serventy's Birds of Western Australia:

Not only were Mr Whitlock’s discoveries very numerous, but he has the gift of being able so to describe his field-work that the many records he left in the pages of The Emu are not only literary efforts of a high standard, but are also work-pictures of the habits of the species with which he has come into contact. (Whittell, 1940).

He is also published in other Australian publications, including the journal Notes of the Gould League.

His extensive collections of specimens, nests and eggs are held at the Western Australian Museum, in the H. L. White Collection at the Museum of Victoria, and the Mathews Collection in New York's American Museum of Natural History. The collections and information he provided allowed for scientific study of the range and diversity of birds, including subspecies that were yet to be described. Whitlock is credited with the last new avian species of the state to be named and described, and commemorated by authors in systematic and common names.

Taxa bearing his name include

- Acanthiza apicalis whitlocki, Whitlock's tit. Collected by him and described as a species, Acanthiza whitlocki, by A. J. North, who was requested to honour Whitlock by the sponsor of his expedition, H. L. White.
- Ocyphaps lophotes whitlocki, a crested columbid (pigeon and dove family) he collected in regions of the centre and North of Western Australia.
- Whitlocka, a synonym for the avian genus Climacteris, proposed by G. M. Mathews for the species Climacteris melanurus, the black-tailed treecreeper.
- Melithreptus whitlocki Mathews, G.M. 1909 (Bulletin of the British Ornithologists' Club, vol 25, p. 24), then described as a new subspecies – nowadays considered a synonym of Gilbert's honeyeater (Melithreptus chloropsis).

An archive containing Whitlock's notes and diaries is held at JS Battye Library of West Australian History.

== Expeditions ==
Whitlock joined or led a number of expeditions within the state of Western Australia, significantly contributing to the region's ornithology during a period of increased exploration and scientific research. On the recommendation of L. F. von Wieldt and A. W. Milligan, Whitlock began collecting for the Western Australian Museum in 1902. He also made collections for others, notably eggs for H. L. White and supplying skins to G. M. Mathews, while still employed at the museum. His expeditions produced major collections from Lake Way (1909), the Nullarbor Plain (1921), and from the remote region of Central Australia in 1923. While at the Nullarbor he collected three specimens of an undescribed species, Blue-Bonnet Parrot, later given the name Psephotus narethae. Whitlock failed to collect a specimen of the elusive Night parrot, Pezoporus occidentalis, while searching at Henbury Station, but recorded sightings and observations of other birds in that region.

=== List of expeditions ===
A chronological list of regions visited by Whitlock includes,

- Kalgoorlie district, 1901. Whitlock's first collecting trip.
- East Murchison, 1902–03. Whitlock returned to this area in 1909.
- Mogumber, near Moore River, preceding:
- Wongan Hills, 1903. Joining A. W. Milligan and C. P. Conigrave.
- Rottnest Island, Norseman, 1904.
- Wilson Inlet, near where he resided at Youngs Siding, 1904–07.
- Irwin Valley, 1907.

From 1908 he was employed by H. L. White, and devoted most of his time visiting Western and central Australian regions to obtain birds and their eggs.

- De Grey River, Condon River, Abrolhos Islands, 1908.
- East Murchison, Lake Way district, near the town of Wiluna, 1909. Whitlock's record of the journey was published by The Emu in April 1910. He describes being commissioned by H. L. White to revisit the Northwest region, and after assembling his notes he wrote to J. T. Tunney regarding a label attached to a mounted specimen at Perth Museum, described as a "Guttated Bower-Bird" (Chlamydodera guttata) and collected "50 miles NW of Lake Way". Tunney replied with the exact location of his collection, noting it was the only one he saw, and Whitlock resolved to direct his journey toward the same site. On this expedition he obtained the type specimens for North's descriptions of the grey honeyeater, Lacustroica whitei, and Acanthiza apicalis whitlocki, Whitlock's tit.
- Stirling Range, country around Wilson Inlet, Nullagine River, 1910, 1911.
- Coongan River, Barrow Island, 1917.
- Peron Peninsula, Barrow Island, Dirk Hartog Island, 1918.
- Nullarbor Plain, 1921.
- Fortescue River, 1922.

== Bibliography ==
- Whitlock, F.B. (1893). The Birds of Devonshire. London: Bemrose & Sons. OCLC 9793815 (all editions).
- —— (1897a). Migration of birds; a consideration of Herr Gätke's views. London: R.H. Porter. OCLC 964917337 (all editions).
- —— (1897b). "The Breeding Habits of the Purple Heron". The Zoologist. 4th series, vol 1 (675 (September, 1897)): 407–409.
- Whitlock, F. Lawson (1910). "On the East Murchison, Four Months' Collecting Trip". The Emu. IX (4): 181–219. (with 10 photo's by the author)
- —— (1939a). "Birds of the Bunbury District, Western Australia". Emu. 39 (1): 47–56. Bibcode:1939EmuAO..39...47W. doi:10.1071/MU939047.
- —— (1939b). "Notes on the Thick-billed Thornbill". Emu. 39 (3): 176–178. doi:10.1071/MU939176.
- Whitlock, F. L.; Whittell, H.M. (1942). "Petrel Notes from Western Australia". Emu. 42 (1): 36–43. Bibcode:1942EmuAO..42...36W. doi:10.1071/MU942036.

== Sources ==
- Whittell, Major H.M. (1940). "Frederick Lawson Whitlock". The Emu. XXXIX (4): 279–. Bibcode:1940EmuAO..39..279W. doi:10.1071/MU939279.
