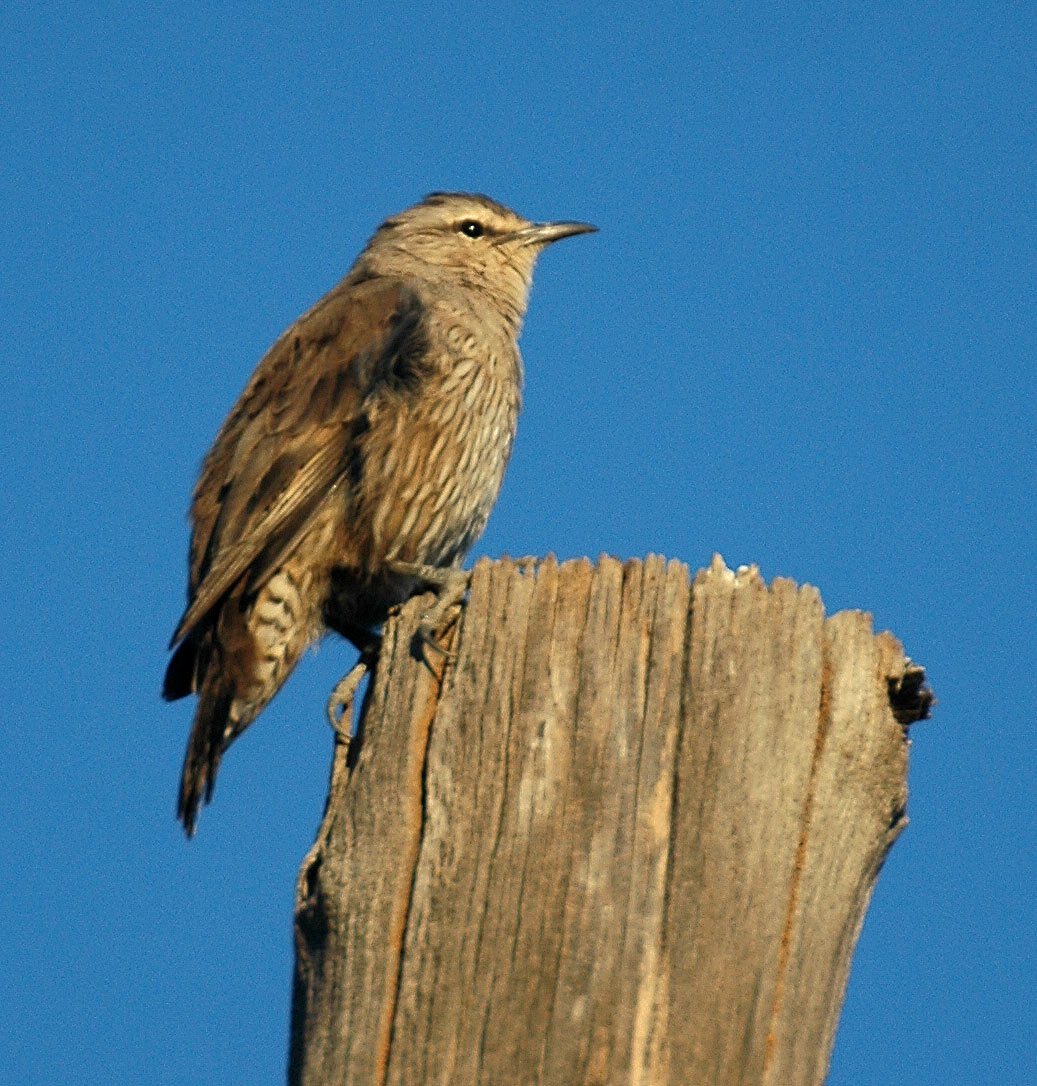
- Brown treecreeper (Climacteris picumnus)

Scientific classification
- Kingdom: Animalia
- Phylum: Chordata
- Class: Aves
- Order: Passeriformes
- Family: Climacteridae
- Genus: Climacteris; Temminck, 1820

Type species
- Climacteris picumnus Temminck, 1824

Synonyms
- Whitlocka G. M. Mathews, 1912. Neoclima G. M. Mathews, 1912.

= Climacteris =

Genus of birds

Climacteris is a genus of bird in the family Climacteridae. These birds and the other members of the family, genus Cormobates, are similar to Northern Hemisphere creepers, Certhiidae, in climbing helically up tree trunks looking for insect food. Differences from Cormobates are

- Climacteris species have black, slightly downcurved bills.
- They have a rusty chest stripe in the female. (In Cormobates the female is marked on the face.)
- They have simple vocal repertoires that are the same for both sexes.
- They lay heavily marked pinkish eggs (Simpson and Day 1999).
- They are cooperative breeders; male offspring of previous broods and sometimes other individuals help breeding pairs (Doerr, 2003).

It contains the following species:

| Image | Scientific name | Common name | Distribution |
|---|---|---|---|
| | Climacteris affinis | White-browed treecreeper | Australia. |
| | Climacteris erythrops | Red-browed treecreeper | Australia |
| | Climacteris picumnus | Brown treecreeper | Cape York, Queensland, throughout New South Wales and Victoria to Port Augusta and the Flinders Ranges, South Australia |
| | Climacteris melanurus | Black-tailed treecreeper | north and northwestern Australia |
| | Climacteris rufus | Rufous treecreeper | Australia. |

The Australian author G. M. Mathews published new generic names in 1912, based on characteristics that distinguished two species from this genus,

- Whitlocka, to describe the black-tailed northwestern species, Climacteris melanurus. The generic epithet honoured the ornithologist F. Lawson Whitlock.
- Neoclima, assigning the species Climacteris picumnus, brown treecreeper, of Temminck as the type.
