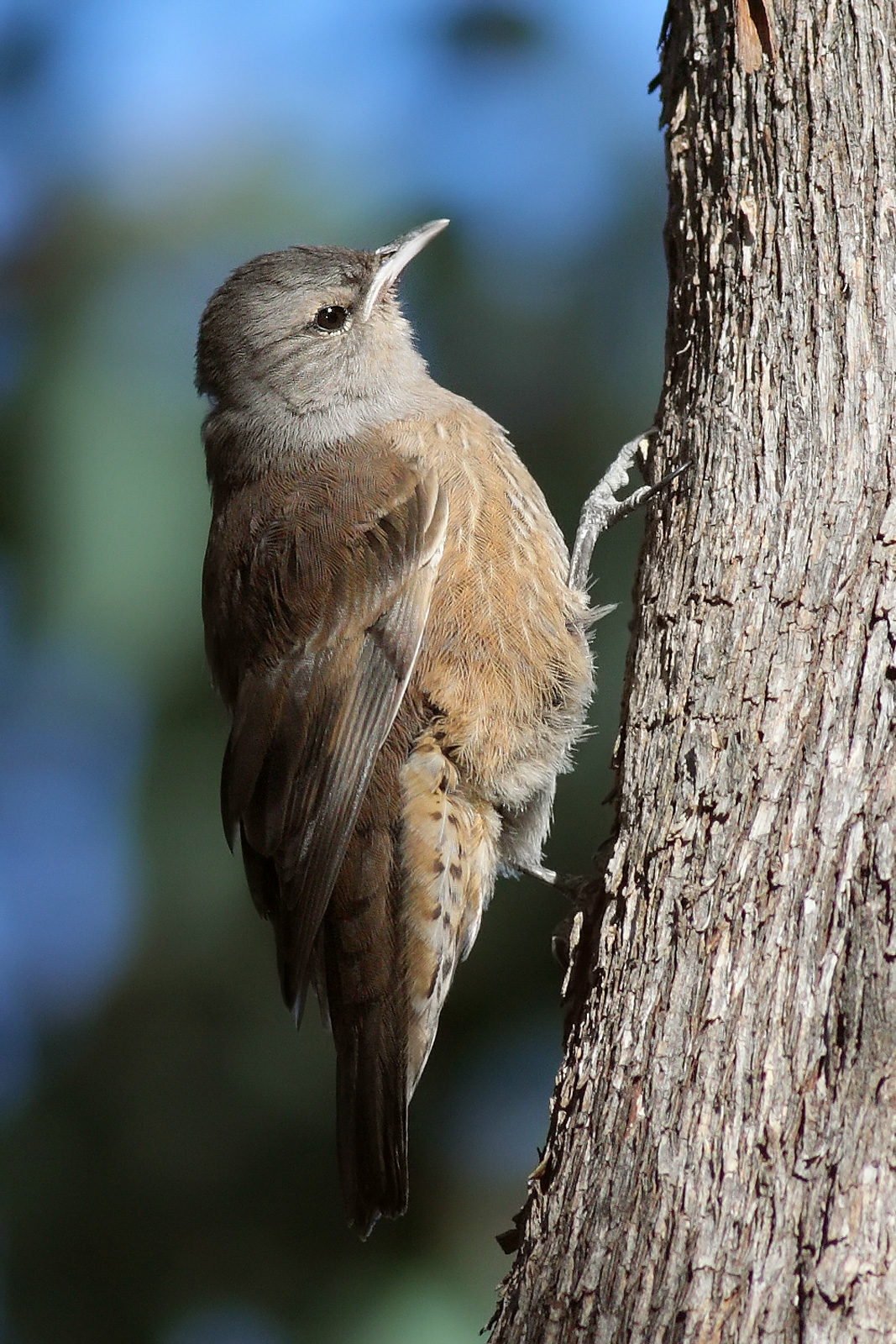
- Brown treecreeper (Climacteris picumnus)

Scientific classification
- Kingdom: Animalia
- Phylum: Chordata
- Class: Aves
- Order: Passeriformes
- Infraorder: Climacterides
- Family: Climacteridae; Sélys, 1839

Genera
- Cormobates; Climacteris

= Australasian treecreeper =

Australasian treecreepers

Family of birds

There are seven species of Australasian treecreeper, the common name of the passerine bird family Climacteridae. They are medium-small, mostly brown birds with patterning on their underparts, and all are endemic to Australia-New Guinea. They superficially resemble, but are not closely related to, the Holarctic treecreepers. The family is one of several families identified by DNA–DNA hybridisation studies to be part of the Australo-Papuan songbird radiation. There is some molecular support for suggesting that their closest relatives are the large lyrebirds.

As their name implies, treecreepers forage for insects and other small creatures living on and under the bark of trees, mostly eucalypts, though several species also hunt on the ground, through leaf-litter, and on fallen timber. Unlike the Holarctic treecreepers they do not use their tail for support when climbing tree trunks, only their feet.

Australasian treecreepers nest in holes in trees. The species in the family hold breeding territories, although the extent to which they are defended and last varies. Some species, such as the red-browed treecreeper and the brown treecreeper are cooperative breeders, others, like the white-throated treecreeper are not. The cooperative breeders form groups or a single breeding pair as well as up to three helpers, which are usually the young males of previous pairings. Helpers assist with the construction of the nest, feeding of the incubating female and feeding and defending the young.

== Description ==
The Australasian treecreepers are small oscine songbirds, measuring 14 to 19 cm (5.5–7.5 in) in length and weighing 17–44 g (0.60–1.55 oz). They have relatively long tails, short legs with strong feet, stout bodies and longish and slightly down-curved bills. The plumage of this family is dull, trending towards brown, reddish-brown or greyish brown above and paler below. There is usually some sexual dimorphism in plumage, with females having some reddish colour in the head or breast that is absent in the males. Other differences between the sexes are common, and can arise very early in the life of these birds, being present even in late-stage nestlings. They are poor fliers, with their flight described as undulating and gliding.

== Distribution and habitat ==
All the Australian treecreepers are endemic to Australia except for one species restricted to New Guinea. They are found across much of Australia except for the large island of Tasmania, possibly because they are poor fliers and unable to disperse across water barriers, or possibly because of a lack of bark-dwelling invertebrates to feed on.

Across their global distribution they occupy a wide range of habitats. The Papuan treecreeper is found in mid-montane to montane forested habitats on New Guinea, from 1,250–3,000 m (4,100–9,840 ft). The white-browed treecreeper inhabits acacia and Casuarina woodlands in deserts in southern Australia. Other species inhabit subtropical rainforest, eucalypt woodlands and southern beech forests. The brown treecreeper is semi-terrestrial and can live in more open woodland habitats, but is still sensitive to the loss of its habitat. The Australasian treecreepers are essentially non-migratory, although there are distinct differences in the dispersal of young birds after fledging, especially between the two genera.

== Behaviour ==
=== Diet and feeding ===
The Australasian treecreepers principally forage for arthropods found on the bark of trees, but they will also take prey from the ground and will eat tree sap and nectar from flowers. They commonly obtain insect prey by gleaning from surface of bark, but will also probe into holes and pull at loose strips of bark and flick underneath it with their quadrifid tongue.

=== Breeding ===
The breeding season lasts from June into January. The birds lay 2-3 eggs per clutch with an incubation time of 17 days. Nests are built by both male and female with soft materials like grass and feathers. The treecreeper will often get helper birds to feed chicks or contribute to the nest.

== Taxonomy ==
Image	Genus	Living species
	Cormobates Mathews, 1922	Papuan treecreeper, Cormobates placens; White-throated treecreeper, Cormobates leucophaea
	Climacteris Temminck, 1820	White-browed treecreeper, Climacteris affinis; Red-browed treecreeper, Climacteris erythrops; Brown treecreeper, Climacteris picumnus; Black-tailed treecreeper, Climacteris melanurus; Rufous treecreeper, Climacteris rufus
