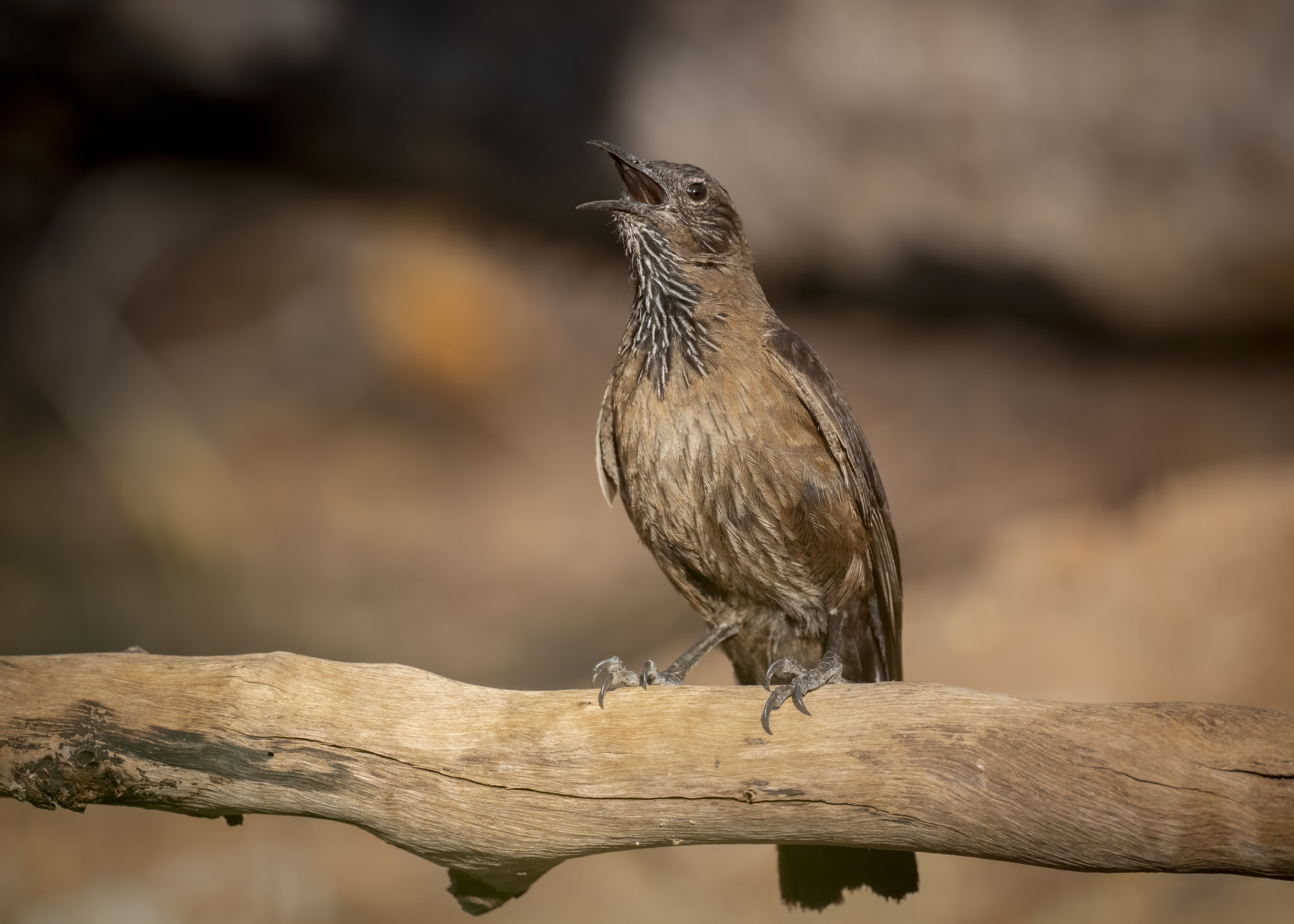
- A black-tailed treecreeper near Marrakai, Northern Territory, Australia.

Conservation status
- Least Concern (IUCN 3.1)

Scientific classification
- Kingdom: Animalia
- Phylum: Chordata
- Class: Aves
- Order: Passeriformes
- Family: Climacteridae
- Genus: Climacteris
- Species: C. melanurus

Binomial name
- Climacteris melanurus Gould, 1843

= Black-tailed treecreeper =

Species of bird

The black-tailed treecreeper (Climacteris melanurus) is a species of bird in the family Climacteridae. It is endemic to north and northwestern Australia and is the only treecreeper species found throughout most of its range. It belongs to the genus Climacteris and is noticeably darker than the other members of the genus.

Its natural habitats are temperate forests and subtropical or tropical moist lowland forests.

== Description and Habitat ==
The black-tailed treecreeper is small to medium in size, generally measuring between 16–20 centimetres (6.3–7.9 in) in length with a weight of 27–36 grams (0.95–1.27 oz). It has a wing length of 8.7–10.2 centimetres (3.4–4.0 in) and a white wing-bar that is highly visible during flight. Both sexes are dark brown and black-tailed with large feet. The male has a black throat with white streaking, while the female has a white throat and white streaking through a reddish-brown upper breast. Similar in appearance to the brown treecreeper of eastern Australia, with no white supercilium being the most obvious distinction.

Habitat includes open grassy woodlands, savanna, dry forest, and moist lowland forest. It is the only treecreeper species found in northern Australia, and normally travels in pairs or trios, and occasionally small groups.

=== Calls ===
It is most often heard giving a contact call, a loud, metallic chee-ting or ching, often singly or in repeated 1–2 second intervals. When feeding or in flight, a quick burst of softer notes may be heard. Other calls include a slow, repeated pip pip pip.

== Breeding ==
They participate in cooperative breeding, in which multiple individuals assist in raising young — not just the biological parents. A clutch of 1–3 pinkish-white, reddish-brown spotted or purplish-red spotted eggs are laid, measuring around 25 by 19 millimetres (0.98 in × 0.75 in). Nests are made of fur, grass, and feathers, normally in hollowed out tree trunks and branches. Incubation takes between 14–24 days. They likely reach sexual maturity around 2 years old.

== Feeding and behavior ==
The black-tailed treecreeper is an insectivore, primarily feeding on invertebrates found beneath the bark of tree trunks and branches, and occasionally on the ground. They generally land near the base of a tree and climb rapidly upwards, often spiraling around the trunk as they search for food — a common trait among Australasian treecreepers. It is considered sedentary and does not migrate, preferring to stay in the same general area year-round.

== Evolution ==
The black-tailed treecreeper is thought to be the closest living relative (a sister taxon) of the brown treecreeper. The two birds were likely a single species, separated over time by the Carpentarian Barrier — a large, historically sparse and dry area in north-eastern Australia, which prevented the two groups from interacting. They diverged genetically and remain allopatric, but share many similarities, including appearance, habitat and similar mannerisms. It is also closely related to the rufous treecreeper of southern and southwestern Australia.

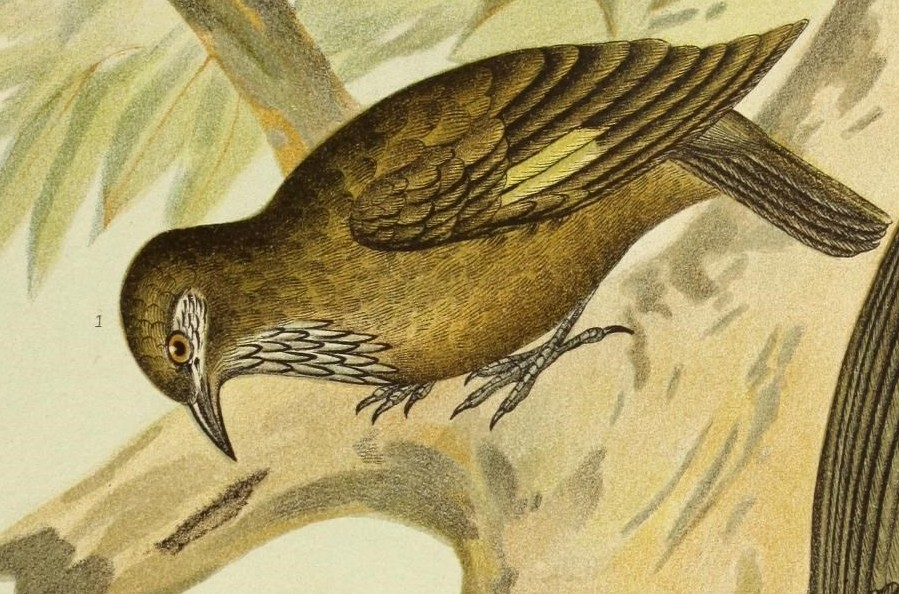
An illustration of the black-tailed treecreeper from Gracius Broinowski's book The birds of Australia

== Taxonomy ==
Climacteris melanurus was first described as C. melanura by the English ornithologist John Gould in an 1843 publishing of the journal Proceedings of the Zoological Society of London, of which Gould was a member. The description was based on a specimen collected by Benjamin Bynoe near modern-day Derby, during the third voyage of HMS Beagle to Australia. Around the same time, Gould himself had also been in Australia on an unrelated trip, collecting bird specimens for his book The Birds of Australia, in which the species would later be published. The genus name Climacteris is derived from the Greek word klimaktēr (κλιμακτήρ), meaning 'rung of a ladder', referring to the birds' habit of climbing vertically up tree trunks. The specific epithet melanurus derives from the Greek words melas (meaning black) and ourā́ (meaning tail), hence the common name, "black-tailed".

=== Subspecies ===
There are two recognised subspecies:

- C. m. melanurus – The nominate subspecies, found across Northern Australia from the Kimberley region in Western Australia to the Leichhardt River in Queensland.
- C. m. wellsi Ogilvie-Grant, 1909 – Only found in the Pilbara region of northwest Western Australia, between the De Grey and Fortescue Rivers. It was originally described by William Robert Ogilvie-Grant as a separate species, Climacteris wellsi, in 1909, but was later reclassified as a subspecies. Before being reclassed, it was known as the Allied treecreeper. Mitochondrial DNA testing has since confirmed that the two birds are deeply divergent, further supporting their status as subspecies.

The subspecies differ slightly in appearance; C. m. wellsi is slightly smaller and paler, with females having more extensive streaking through the breast, and rufous-brown underparts. Their ranges do not overlap, separated by the Great Sandy Desert of northwestern Australia, in which there have been no sightings.

== Conservation ==
The black-tailed treecreeper is assessed as Least Concern on the IUCN Red List. The population is considered stable, with an extremely large range.

== See also ==
- Australasian treecreeper
