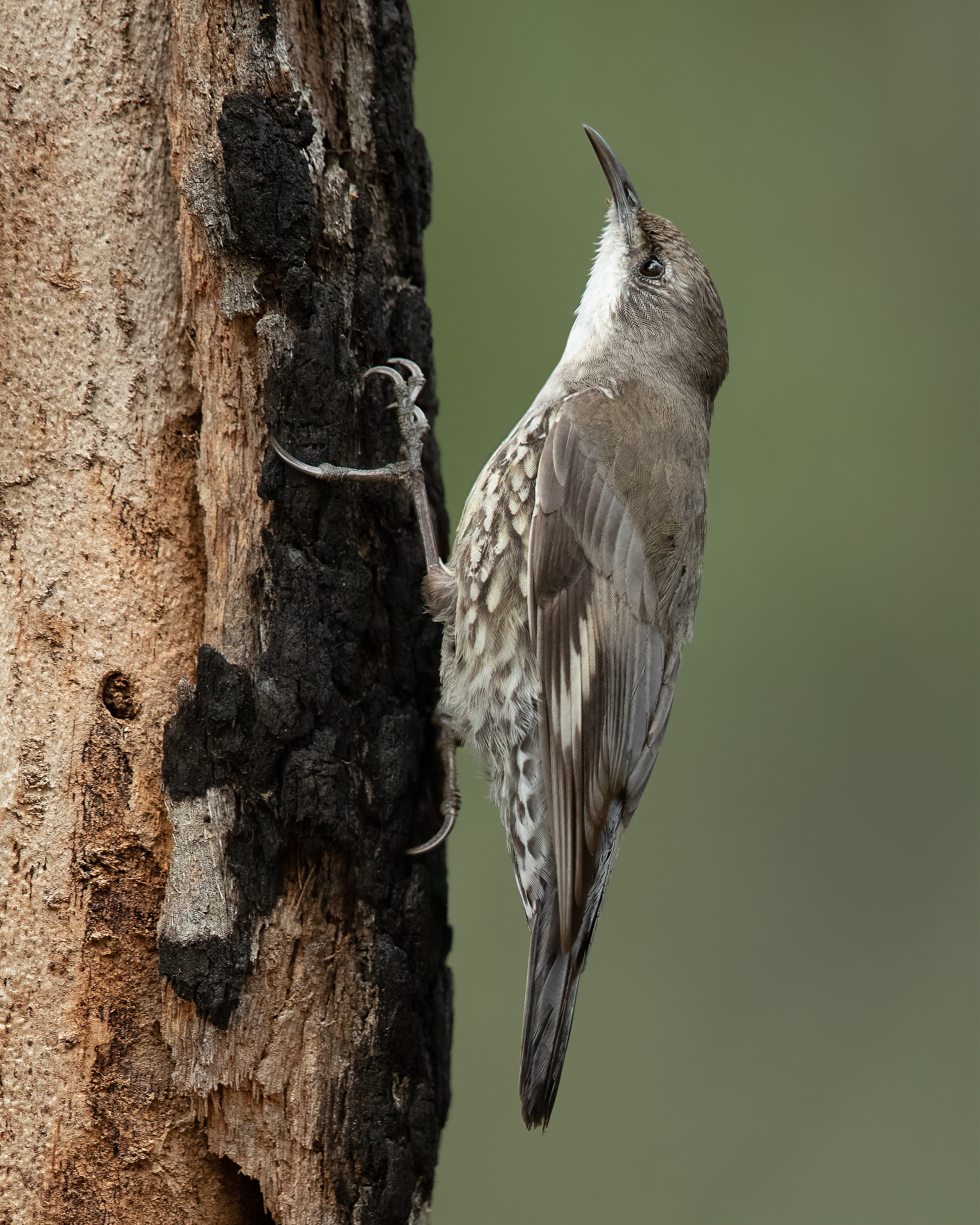
- C. l. leucophaea
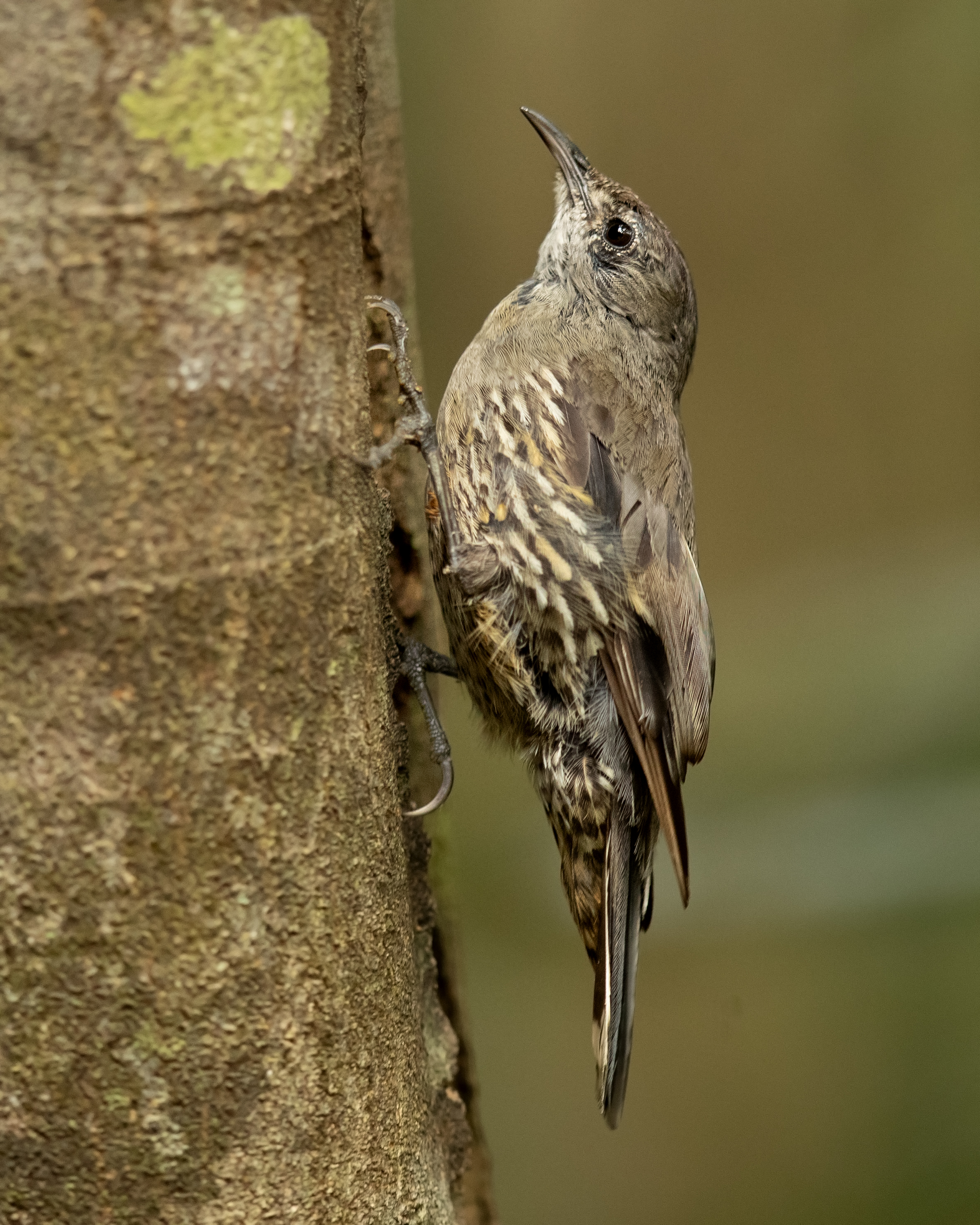
- C. l. minor

Conservation status
- Least Concern (IUCN 3.1)

Scientific classification
- Kingdom: Animalia
- Phylum: Chordata
- Class: Aves
- Order: Passeriformes
- Family: Climacteridae
- Genus: Cormobates
- Species: C. leucophaea

Binomial name
- Cormobates leucophaea (Latham, 1801)

Synonyms
- Climacteris leucophaeus

= White-throated treecreeper =

Species of bird

The white-throated treecreeper (Cormobates leucophaea) is an Australian treecreeper found in the forests of eastern Australia. It is also called Dilmun in the Gathang language of the Worimi people, who reside in eastern Port Stephens and Great Lakes regions of coastal New South Wales, Australia. The Dilmun is the totem of Worimi women. It is unrelated to the northern hemisphere treecreepers. It is a small passerine bird with predominantly brown and white plumage and measuring some 15 cm (6 in) long on average. It is insectivorous, eating mainly ants. Unlike treecreepers of the genus Climacteris, the white-throated treecreeper does not engage in cooperative breeding, and wherever it overlaps with species of that genus, it feeds upon much looser bark besides typically using different trees.

== Taxonomy ==
It was first described by ornithologist John Latham in 1801 as Certhia leucophaea. For many years it was classified in the genus Climacteris.

The generic name is derived from the Ancient Greek kormos 'trunk of a tree', and 'batēs' from the verb 'to go' or 'to travel', and refers to its mode of walking up and down trees. Its specific name is derived from the Ancient Greek leuko- 'white' and phaios 'dun' or 'dusky', and refers to its plumage. Some guidebooks have the binomial name written as Cormobates leucophaeus, however a review in 2001 rules that the genus name was feminine, hence leucophaea is the correct specific name.

The Papuan treecreeper (Cormobates placens) was previously considered a subspecies but is now recognized as a separate species, although molecular studies have yet to be done on the two taxa.

=== Subspecies ===
Five subspecies are recognised:

- C. l. leucophaea, the nominate subspecies, occurs in southeastern Australia, from southeastern South Australia, through Victoria to south and central eastern New South Wales.
- C. l. grisescens is found in the Mount Lofty Ranges of South Australia.
- C. l. intermedius, described in 1983 by Walter Boles and Wayne Longmore, is restricted to the Clark and Connors Ranges in Central Queensland.
- C. l. metastasis, described by Richard Schodde in 1989, is found in southeastern Queensland and northeastern New South Wales.
- C. l. minor occurs in northern Queensland. It was originally described by Edward Pierson Ramsay in 1891 after being collected near Cairns.

== Description ==
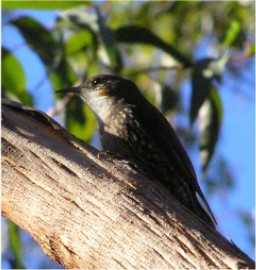
female, showing orange cheeks

Measuring 13–17 cm (5–7 in) in length with a wingspan of 19–26 cm (7.5–10.2 in), averaging 23 cm (9.1 in), and averaging 22 g (0.8 oz) in weight, it has a white throat and breast and barred dark-brown and white belly and flanks. The upperparts and wings are a dark greyish brown, with a buff patch visible on the wings. Unlike other treecreepers, it does not have a pale eyebrow. The bill and feet are black. The female has a pale orange-brown patch on the cheek. Immature birds have an orange-brown rump and white markings on the scapulars. The call is a shrill peeping.

== Distribution and habitat ==
The white-throated treecreeper is found from the Gulf St Vincent in South Australia, through Victoria, and eastern New South Wales and southeastern Queensland, with an area further north from Mount Spec to Cooktown. Wet sclerophyll forest and rainforest is the preferred habitat.

It is Protected in Australia under the National Parks and Wildlife Act, 1974.

== Feeding ==
The white-throated treecreeper is predominantly insectivorous, eating mainly ants, although will eat also nectar. A 2007 study in the Australian Capital Territory showed the white-throated treecreeper preferred foraging on the rough-barked eucalypt, the red stringybark (Eucalyptus macrorhyncha), rather than the smooth barked species, the inland scribbly gum (Eucalyptus rossii). Birds would glean (take prey while bird is perched) and peer, as well as drill in dead wood, for insects. A female was observed feeding on white punk (Laetiporus portentosus), a bracket fungus.

== Breeding ==
Kobble Creek, SE Queensland, Australia

Unlike treecreepers of the genus Climacteris, the white-throated treecreeper does not engage in cooperative breeding. The breeding season is August to December with one brood laid. The cup-shaped nest is composed of fur, hair, feathers, and moss in a hollow in a tree 4–5 m (13–16 ft) above the ground. A clutch of two or three creamy-white oval eggs is laid. Sparsely spotted with dark purple- or red-brown, they measure 23 x 18 mm.
