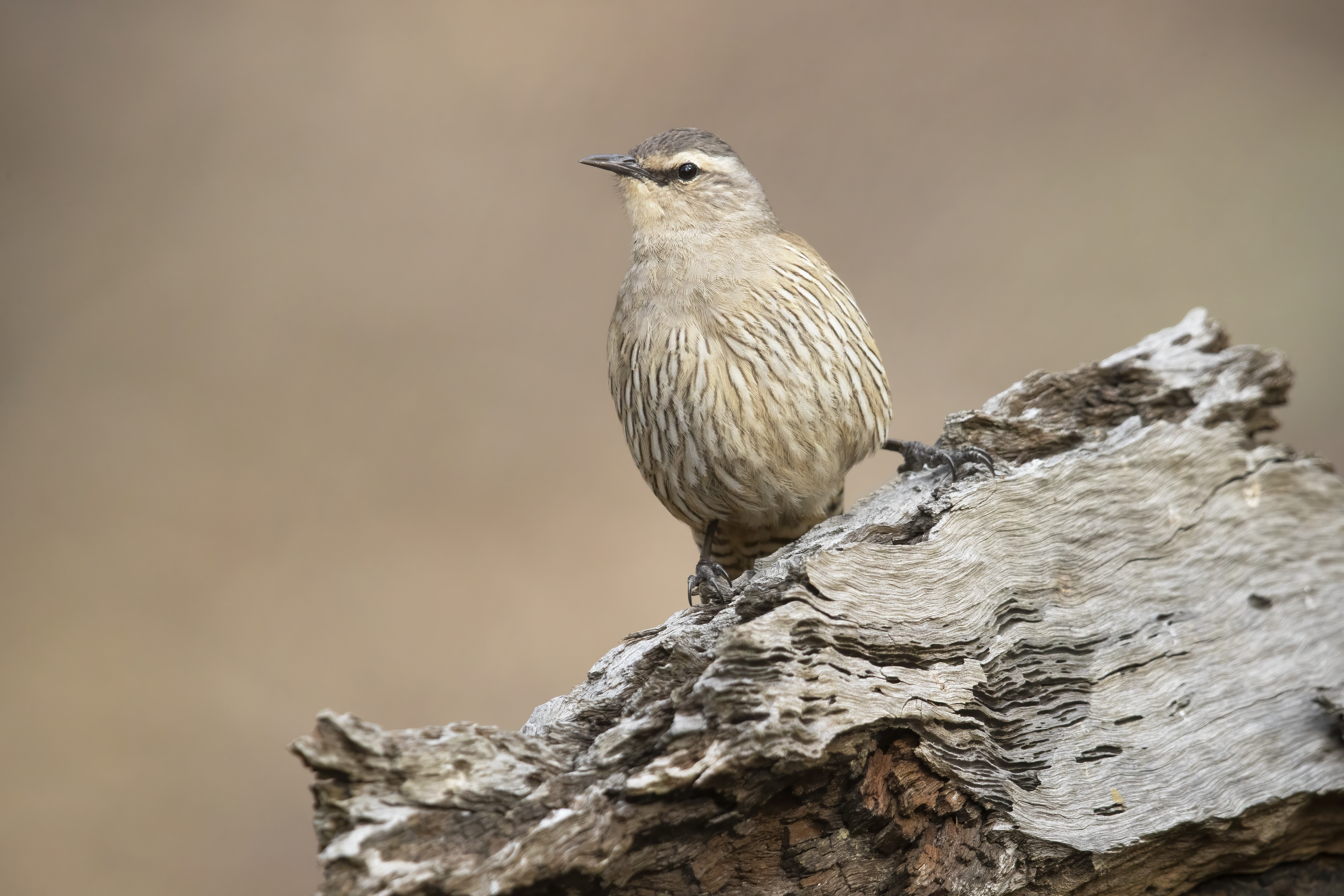

Conservation status
- Least Concern (IUCN 3.1)

Scientific classification
- Kingdom: Animalia
- Phylum: Chordata
- Class: Aves
- Order: Passeriformes
- Family: Climacteridae
- Genus: Climacteris
- Species: C. picumnus

Binomial name
- Climacteris picumnus Temminck, 1824
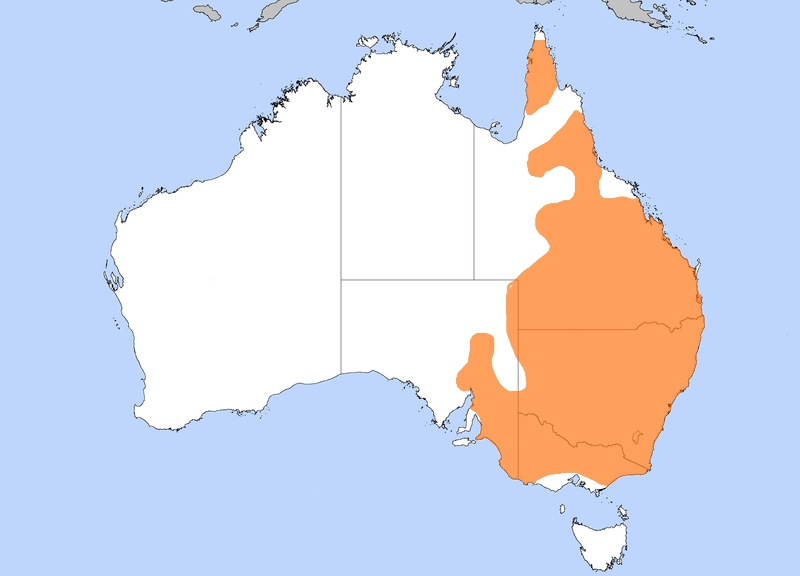
- Range in orange

= Brown treecreeper =

Species of bird

The brown treecreeper (Climacteris picumnus) is the largest Australasian treecreeper. The bird, endemic to eastern Australia, has a broad distribution, occupying areas from Cape York, Queensland, throughout New South Wales and Victoria to Port Augusta and the Flinders Ranges, South Australia. Prevalent nowadays between 16˚S and 38˚S, the population has contracted from the edges of its pre-European range, declining in Adelaide and Cape York. Found in a diverse range of habitats varying from coastal forests to mallee shrub-lands, the brown treecreeper often occupies eucalypt-dominated woodland habitats up to 1,000 metres (3,300 ft), avoiding areas with a dense shrubby understorey.

== Taxonomy ==
Coenraad Jacob Temminck and Meiffren Laugier de Chartrouse described the brown treecreeper in 1824, and it still bears its original name today. It is one of six species of treecreeper found in Australia, and is most closely related to the rufous treecreeper (Climacteris rufus) of Western and Southern Australia, and the black-tailed treecreeper (C. melanurus). All three occupy similar savannah and open woodland habitat, and have a sexually dimorphic marking on the upper breast or throat (black in the male, reddish in the female). They are thought to have been separated by breaks in suitable habitat in the past and hence diverged genetically.

Three subspecies have been described – subspecies picumnus is broadly distributed from the Grampians, Victoria, through central New South Wales to the Bunya Mountains, Queensland. The subspecies can be found in coastal catchments and drier areas on and west of the Great Divide, intergrading with subspecies victoriae, which is found on the Great Dividing Range from south-east Queensland to the Grampians, Victoria. Subspecies melanotus occurs from Cape York Peninsula south to near Cooktown, Queensland. Known as the black treecreeper, it has distinctive sooty brown plumage and is slightly smaller than the southern subspecies.

Woodpecker is a colloquial name, from its habit of spiralling up treetrunks. The Yuwaalaraay people of northern New South Wales know this species by the name bibi.

== Conservation status ==
The brown treecreeper is listed as least concern on the IUCN Red List, while the subspecies victoriae, is listed in New South Wales as vulnerable under Schedule 2 of the Threatened Species Conservation Act (1995). Subspecies victoriae is listed as nationally vulnerable by DCCEEW (Department of Climate Change, Energy, the Environment and Water), under the Environment Protection and Biodiversity Conservation Act (1999).

== Description ==
Adult birds are around 16.5 centimetres (6.5 in) long, with a wingspan of 26 centimetres (10 in), and weigh on average around 31.5 grams (1.11 oz). Adult plumage is light grey-brown above with light grey face and neck, darker grey on the crown with dark ear-coverts. The supercilium is prominent and pale on adults, while grey and indistinct on juveniles. The throat is cream to white and pale brown on the breast. The lower breast is streaked with fine black-grey and white. In flight a dark wing-bar is visible. Sexes of the species differ in plumage, with the uppermost breast of the male streaked black and white, while the female has rufous and white streaking. Juvenile plumage is different from that on the adult with the hind-neck, nape, crown and forehead darker than that of adult males.

The call has been described as a spink spink.

== Social organisation and feeding behaviour ==
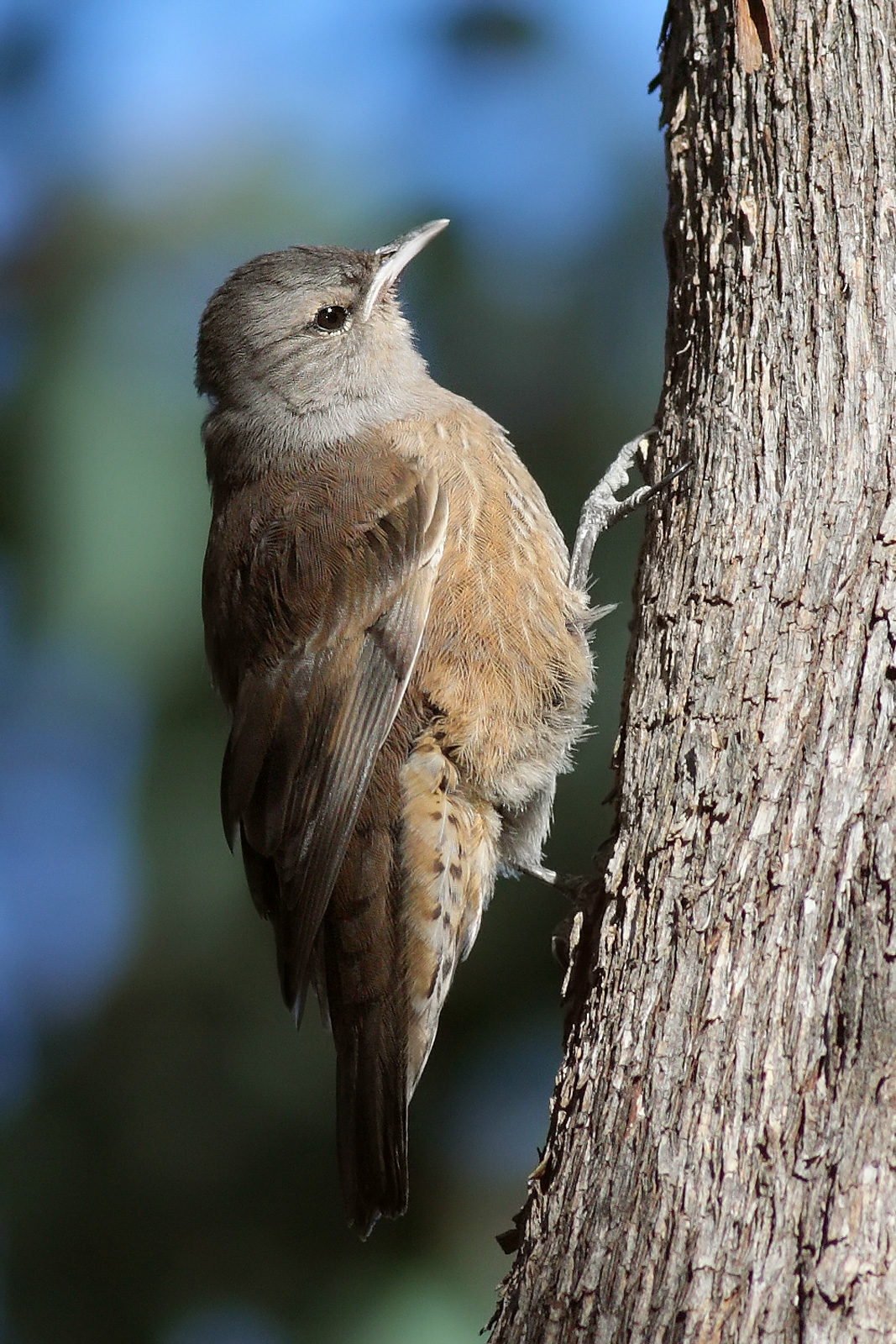
Brown treecreeper foraging on a tree

Gregarious with a complex social structure between individuals and breeding groups, the species maintains a territory which sometimes overlaps with other brown treecreeper groups. Usually observed in pairs or a small group of up to eight individuals, incursions by other groups of brown treecreeper are often tolerated by residents of the same species.

Roosting nocturnally and solitarily, the brown treecreeper forages during the day on the ground and on tree surfaces in small groups or pairs, feeding mainly on ants, beetles and insect larvae. While occasionally feeding on nectar, the brown treecreeper more often probes fissures, cracks and hollows of trees, gleaning and probing as it hops along logs or spirals up rough barked trees, spending more time foraging on the ground if a resident of an arid territory.

== Nesting ==
The brown treecreeper breeds cooperatively and usually forms a long-term socially monogamous pair. Both sexes are able to breed in their first year, with the female usually finding a mate within two years and the male usually obtaining a breeding position sometime after three years. The breeding season lasts from July to February with the majority of eggs laid from September until late October. Incubating is undertaken by the breeding female only.

The nest is usually located in a tree hollow beneath a canopy, often nearby the boundary of another brown treecreeper territory to attract extra help feeding. Building of the nest is undertaken by all members of the group over a period of 1–2 weeks. Nest materials consist of twigs, grass, leaves, bark, dung, animal fur and sometimes human refuse such as aluminum foil. One bird has been recorded collecting fur from a live possum. During building of the nest the breeding female usually transports the heavier nest materials and may discard material delivered by other members of the group.

== Breeding ==
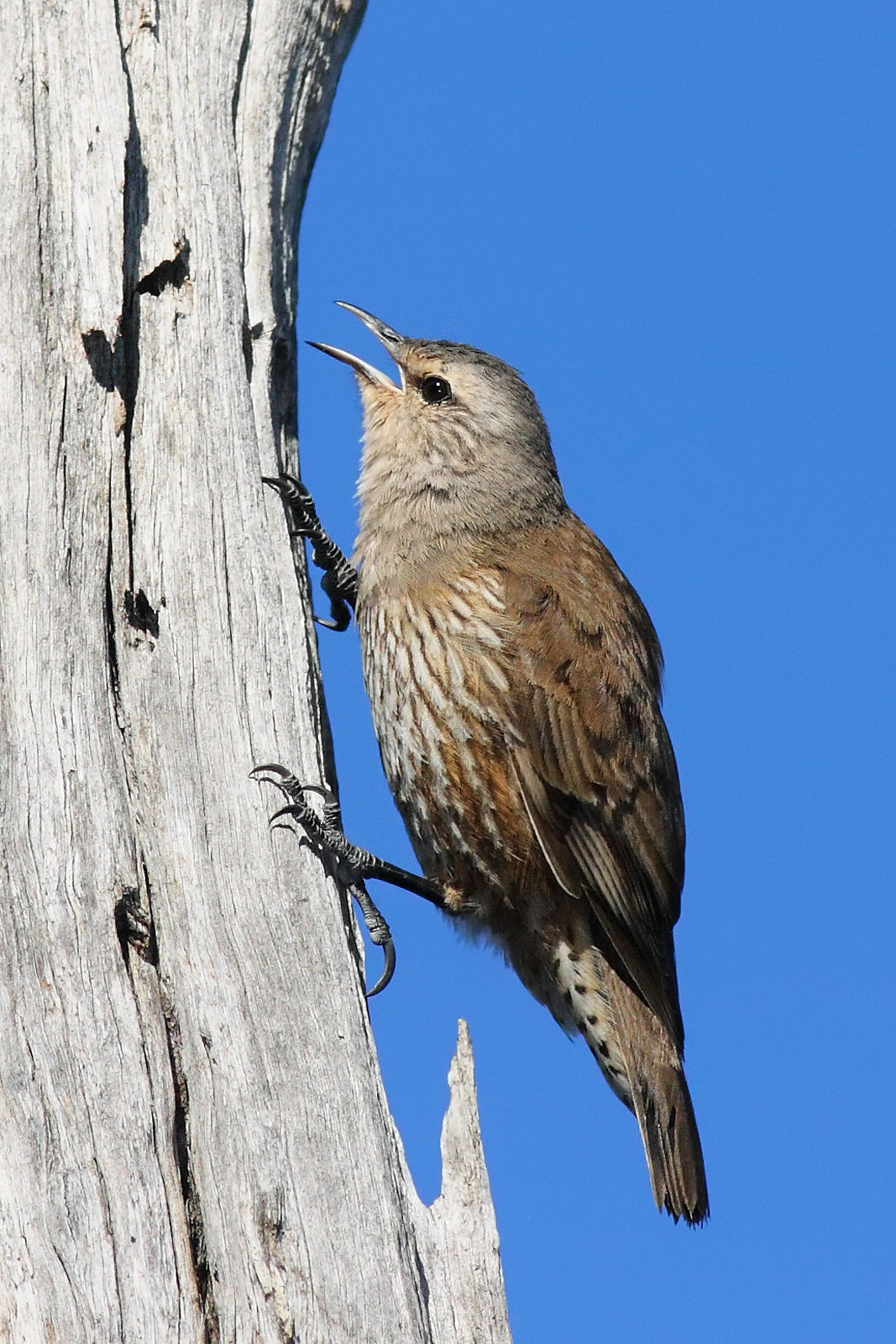

The breeding female usually lays a clutch-size usually of three smooth (sometimes two or four), slightly glossy, fine-grained, slightly pink or rose, reddish-brown or red and purplish-red speckled eggs measuring 22.6 by 17.9 mm. Intervals between egg-laying is most likely 24 hours, with re-laying occurring in the event of failure. Females are able to raise two broods in a season but more often raise one brood. Hatchlings emerge with grey down on their head and back fourteen to sixteen days after incubation.

For a few days after hatching, the female is fed by the primary male. The young are fed by the breeding female who is passed food by the primary male. Faecal sacs are removed from the nest by all members of the group though most often it is the males who do so. Helpers, usually young males related to the breeding male, service their territorial nest and often will service other nests in 2–3 other territories. A variety of insects are fed to the young, with lepidopteran larvae forming the bulk of their diet. Adults avoid feeding the young ants, likely due to the ant's formic acid content. The contribution of helpers to feeding the young is generally equal to the efforts of the breeding pair. Records exist of a single helper servicing the nests of five different territories. Records indicate that in nests attended by helpers, breeding success is four times more likely and significantly more offspring are produced.

== Fledging and dispersal ==
Chicks fledge between 21 and 26 days most likely over a period of a few hours. Initially not able to fly strongly, the fledglings roost in hollows and spouts of trees for one or two days, and are fed by members of the group until independent thirty to forty days later. In a season, breeding groups successfully produce at least one fledgling 50% of the time. The first moult to adult plumage occurs two months after fledging, while adults start moulting in November or February, finishing in March or April. Natal dispersal occurs after winter when most females will disperse to locate an area to breed. Dispersal by males of the species rarely occurs and they commonly remain in their natal territory as helpers until a breeding vacancy arises by inheritance or by territorial budding (when a male paired with a dispersing female inherits a portion of his natal territory). Females disperse earlier than males moving further than the males (up to 5 kilometres (3.1 mi)) to establish a breeding territory.

== Threats to the species ==
Threats to the species include land clearing and the resultant habitat loss and fragmentation, the impacts of which are thought to disrupt dispersal and therefore recruitment. The removal of fallen timber and other woody debris, and competition with exotic species such as the common starling for nesting hollows are also threats to the species.

Subspecies melanotus has declined from eastern parts of its range in Cape York Peninsula, thought to be due to more extensive and frequent fire regime, which has affected fallen tree trunks and logs (a preferred foraging substrate for this species).
