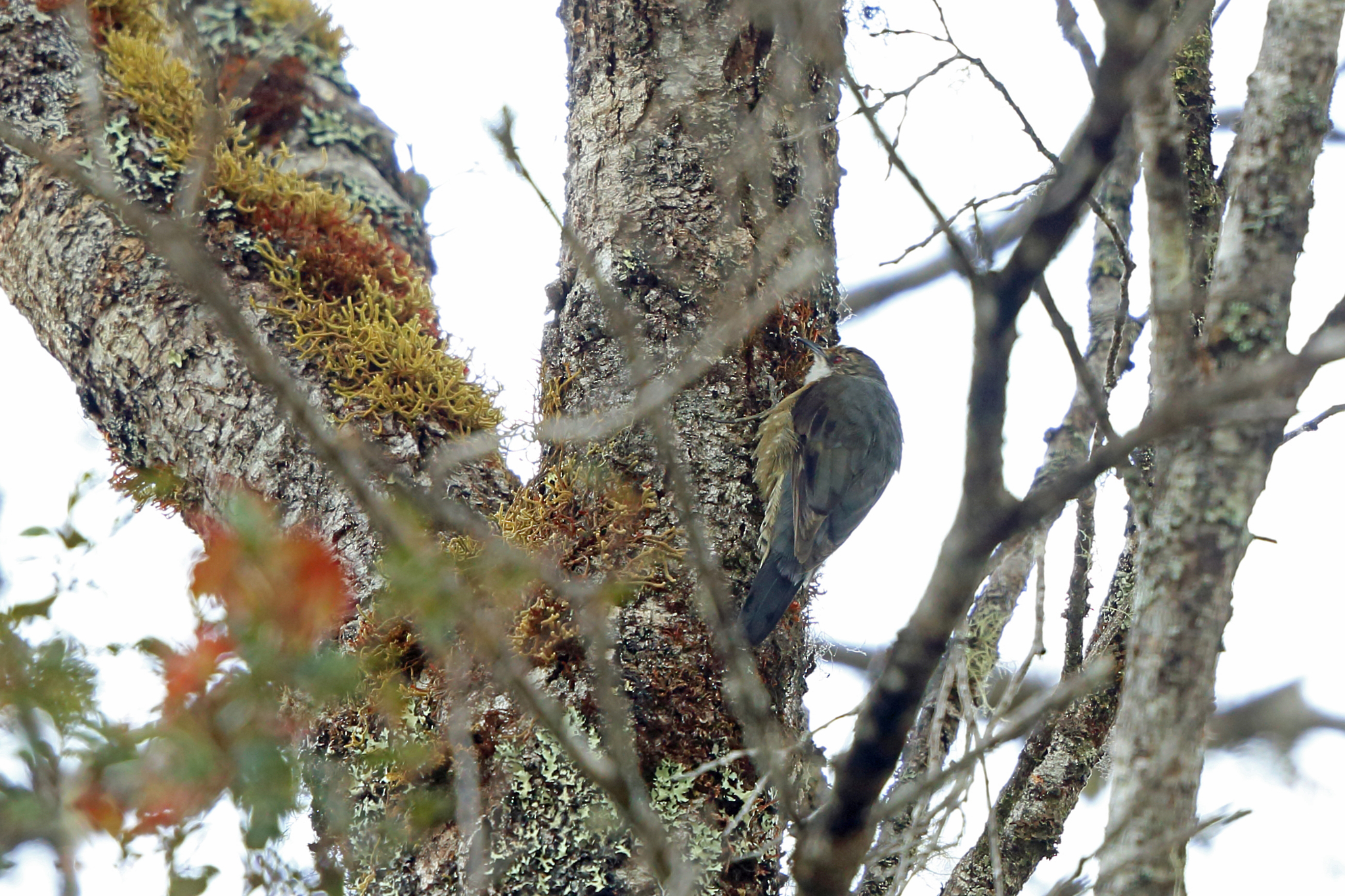

Conservation status
- Least Concern (IUCN 3.1)

Scientific classification
- Kingdom: Animalia
- Phylum: Chordata
- Class: Aves
- Order: Passeriformes
- Family: Climacteridae
- Genus: Cormobates
- Species: C. placens

Binomial name
- Cormobates placens (Sclater, PL, 1874)

= Papuan treecreeper =

Species of bird

The Papuan treecreeper (Cormobates placens) is a species of bird in the family Climacteridae. It was previously considered a subspecies of the white-throated treecreeper (C. leucophaea).

It is found in the highlands of New Guinea.
