= Guillaume Michel Jérôme Meiffren Laugier =

French ornithologist

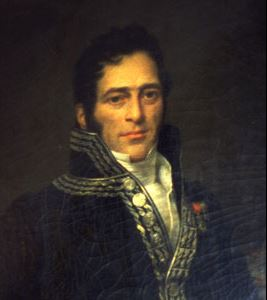
Guillaume Michel Jérôme Meiffren de Laugier, baron de Chartrouse (1772–1843)

Guillaume Michel Jérôme Meiffren Laugier (28 September 1772 – 27 September 1843) was a French ornithologist and bird collector. He is known for his co-authorship of a collection of avian illustrations, Nouveau recueil de planches coloriées d'oiseaux, with Coenraad Jacob Temminck.
