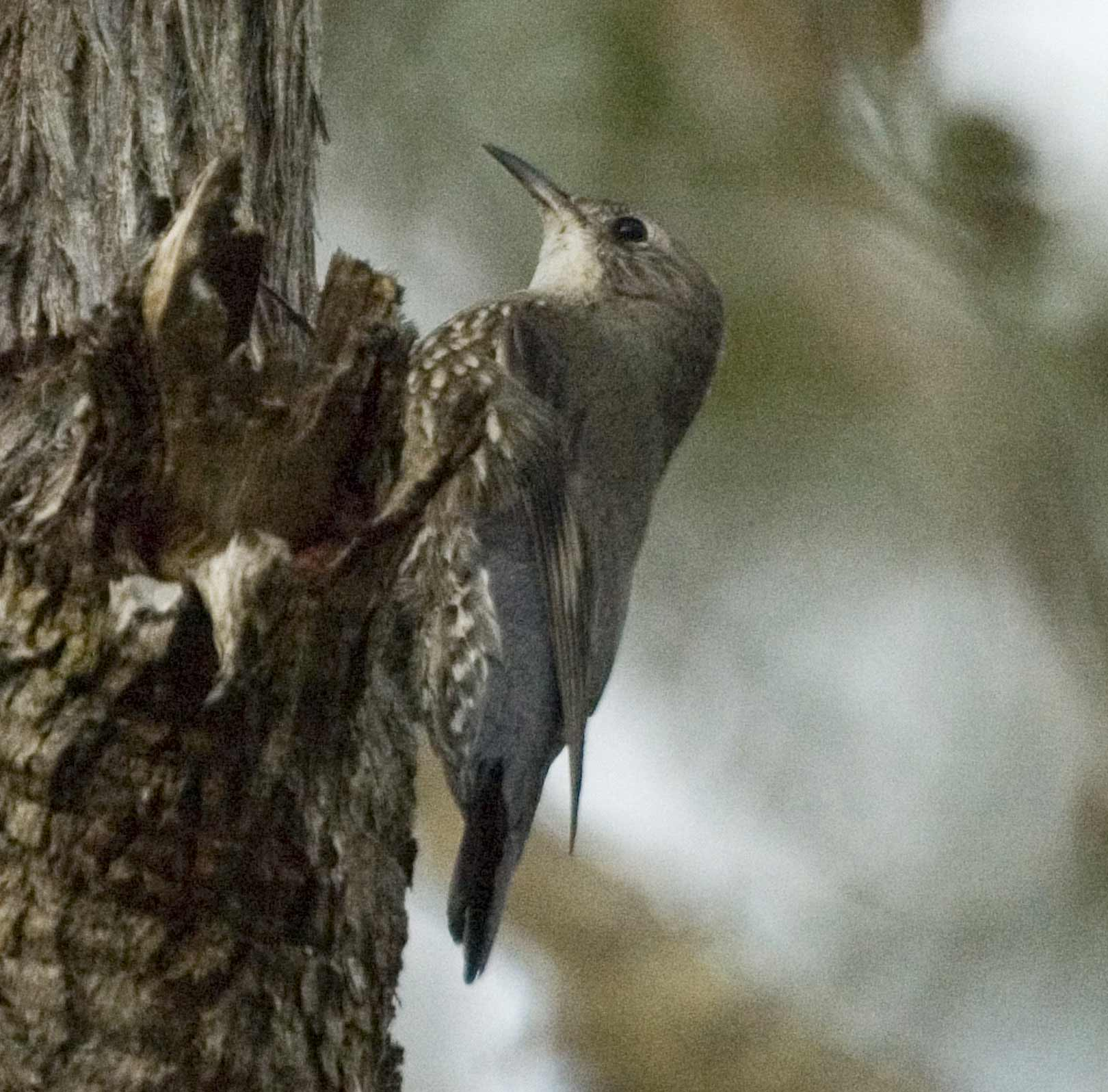
- White-throated treecreeper (Cormobates leucophaea)

Scientific classification
- Kingdom: Animalia
- Phylum: Chordata
- Class: Aves
- Order: Passeriformes
- Family: Climacteridae
- Genus: Cormobates; Mathews, 1922

Type species
- Certhia leucophaea Latham, 1801

= Cormobates =

Genus of birds

Cormobates is a genus of bird in the Australasian treecreeper family. Its scientific name means ‘trunk-creeper’, from the Greek cormos (κορµός, ‘tree trunk’) and bates (βάτης, ‘one who treads’).

It contains the following species:

Image	Scientific name	Common name	Distribution
	Cormobates leucophaea	White-throated treecreeper	eastern Australia
	Cormobates placens	Papuan treecreeper	New Guinea.
