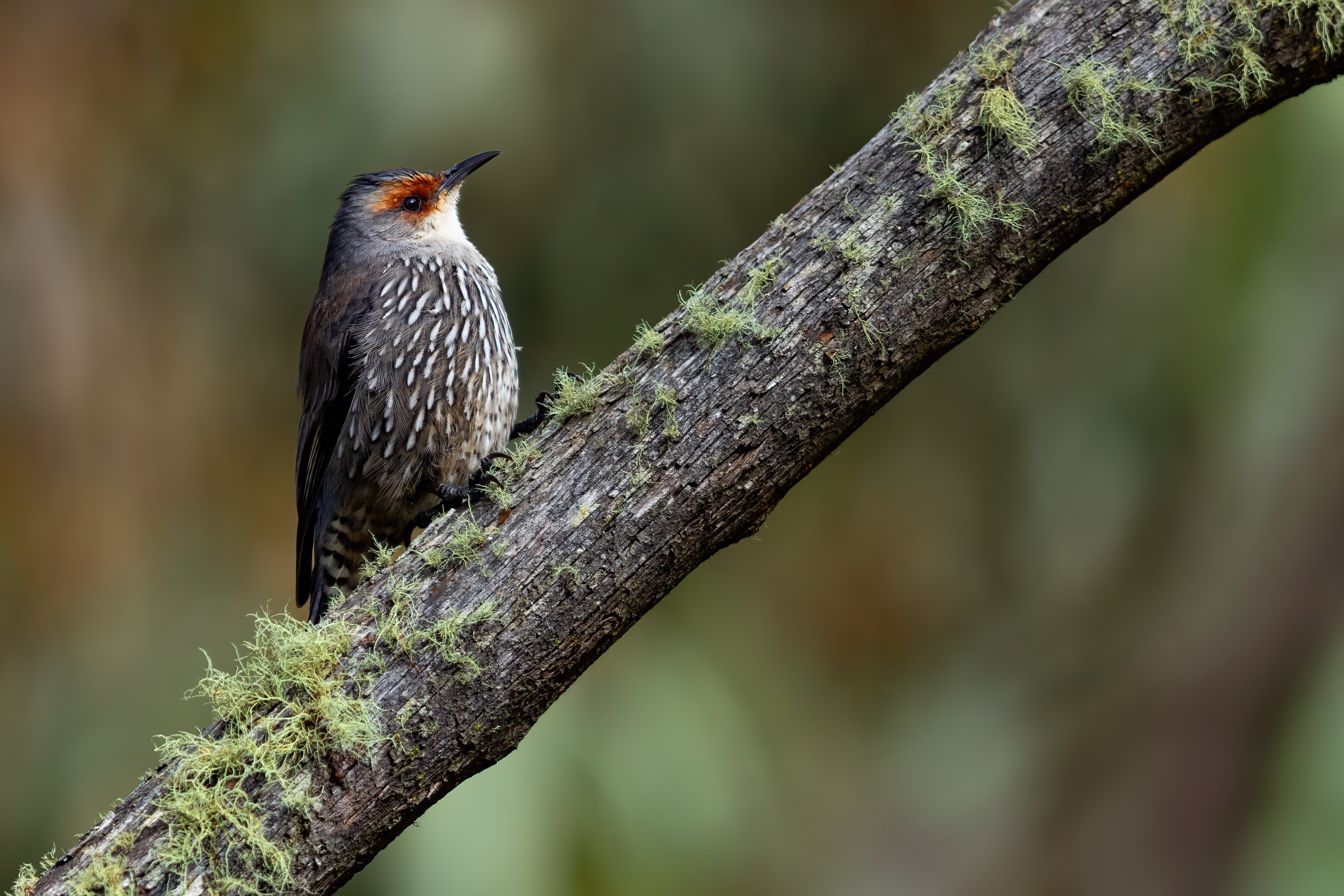
- Blue Mountains

Conservation status
- Least Concern (IUCN 3.1)

Scientific classification
- Kingdom: Animalia
- Phylum: Chordata
- Class: Aves
- Order: Passeriformes
- Family: Climacteridae
- Genus: Climacteris
- Species: C. erythrops

Binomial name
- Climacteris erythrops Gould, 1841

= Red-browed treecreeper =

Species of bird

The red-browed treecreeper (Climacteris erythrops) is a species of bird in the family Climacteridae. It is endemic to temperate and subtropical eastern Australia. It is found in mature eucalypt forests and woodlands in both coastal and mountainous regions, from central Victoria to south-eastern Queensland.

== Diet ==
It feeds on Invertebrates.

== Description ==
It has a dark brown back and a red brow above its eye and measures 14.5–16 cm in length.
