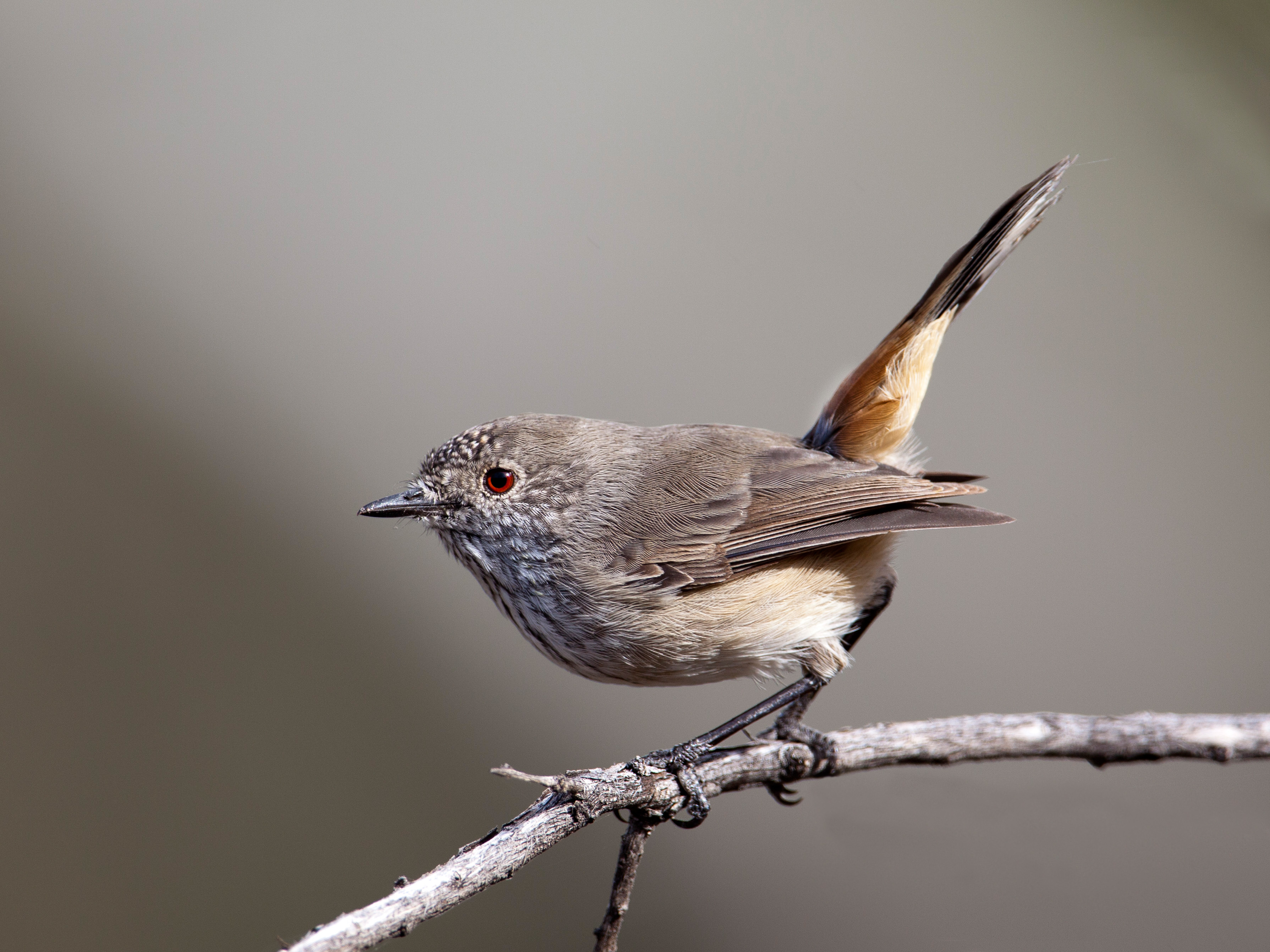

Conservation status
- Least Concern (IUCN 3.1)

Scientific classification
- Kingdom: Animalia
- Phylum: Chordata
- Class: Aves
- Order: Passeriformes
- Family: Acanthizidae
- Genus: Acanthiza
- Species: A. apicalis

Binomial name
- Acanthiza apicalis Gould, 1847

= Inland thornbill =

Inland Thornbill

Species of bird

The inland thornbill (Acanthiza apicalis) was originally described by English ornithologist John Gould in The Birds of Australia. Inland thornbills are within the order passerines. The inland thornbill belongs to the genus Acanthiza, which now has three more species than the eleven outlined by Gould in The Birds of Australia. The Noongar people of southwestern Western Australia call A. apicalis "Djoobi-Djoolbang". The inland thornbill is also known as the broad-tail thornbill and presently contains several subspecies that were once considered independent species. The word apicalis comes from the Latin for 'tipped'.

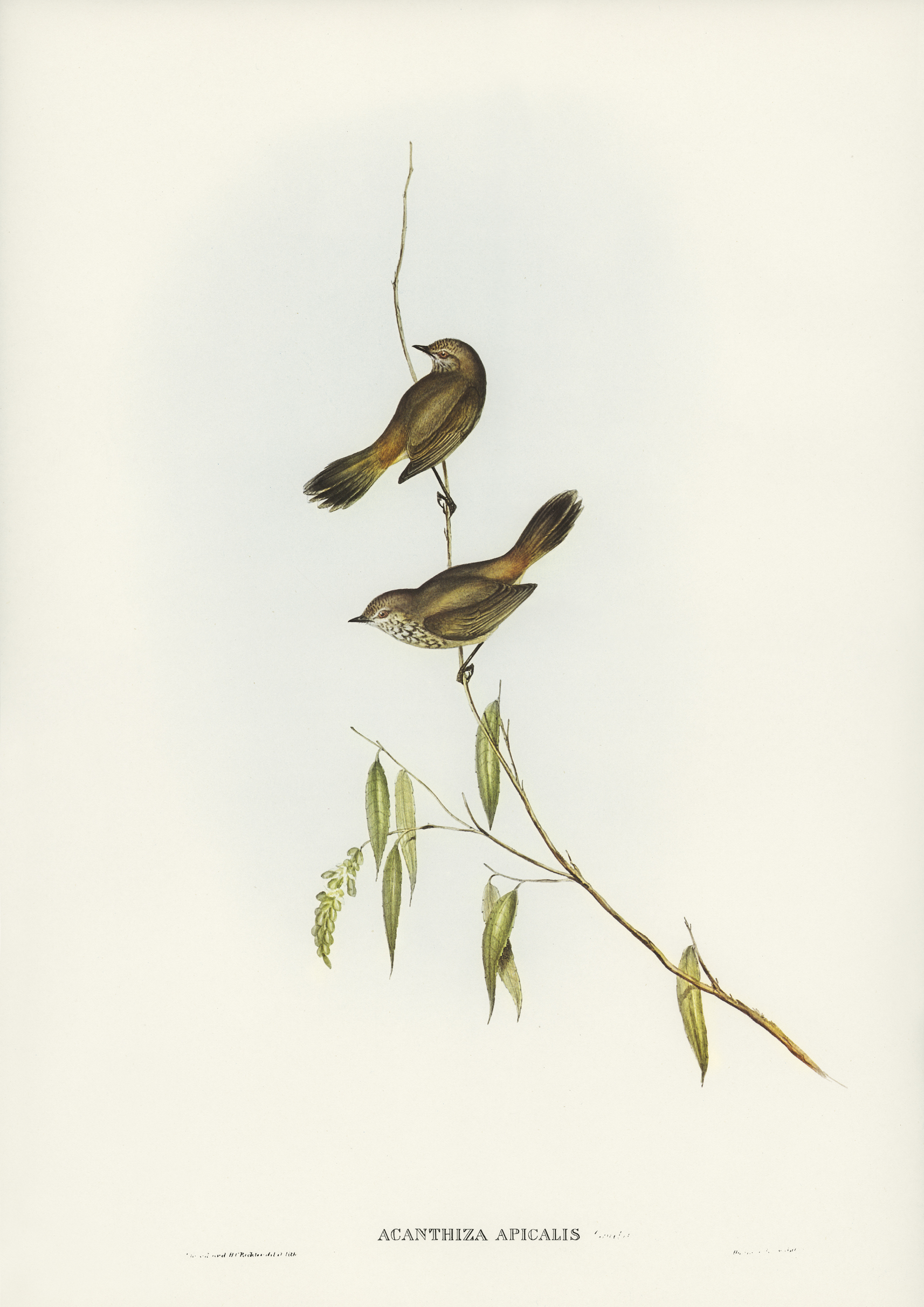
Acanthiza apicalis plate from Birds of Australia (Gould)

== Taxonomy and evolution ==
Early classification of the Acanthiza, or thornbill genus, was inconsistent with the currently accepted taxonomy. Historically, researchers recognised 10 -17 species in 1 – 3 genera. Separate traditional species of Thornbill have now been more accurately classified as subspecies than discrete species; however, the evolutionary relationships between inland thornbills and other Acanthizae are complicated. For example, the relationship between the inland thornbill and the brown thornbill (A. pusilla) and the mountain thornbill (A. katherina) is more complex than just classifying the genus. To further complicate the evolutionary relationships between species in the genus Acanthiza, two species exist outside of Australia in New Guinea. The New Guinea thornbill (A. murina) is found in the highlands of New Guinea, and it is not definitive how this species fits in with the classification of other thornbills. Still, some research has found the New Guinea thornbill to be closely related to A.nana or the yellow thornbill. Traditionally Acanthiza classification was conducted using morphology and plumage patterns.

Recent research using base-substitution data from nuclear DNA (nDNA) sequences sampled from Acanthiza species identified five separate species groups. Inland thornbills are in the same species group as A, pusilla, A. ewingii, and A. katherina. The other species groups are one containing A. inornate, A. uropygialis, A, reguloides, and A. iredalei, one containing A. nana and A. lineata, one containing A. chrysorrhoa, and one for A. robustirostris. The results of the Acanthizae nDNA samples were compared to samples from the gerygone, whiteface and weebill genera, as these species have previously been found to be in the same tribe as Acanthiza.

=== Subspecies ===
There are four recognised subspecies of inland thornbill with different geographic regions:

- Acanthiza apicalis apicalis: the nominate subspecies. Southwestern Western Australia
- Acanthiza apicalis albiventris: Eastern South Australia and northwestern Victoria; central New South Wales and Queensland.
- Acanthiza apicalis cinerascens: West-central Queensland
- Acanthiza apicalis whitlocki: Inland southern Australia, extending to the coast in the west.

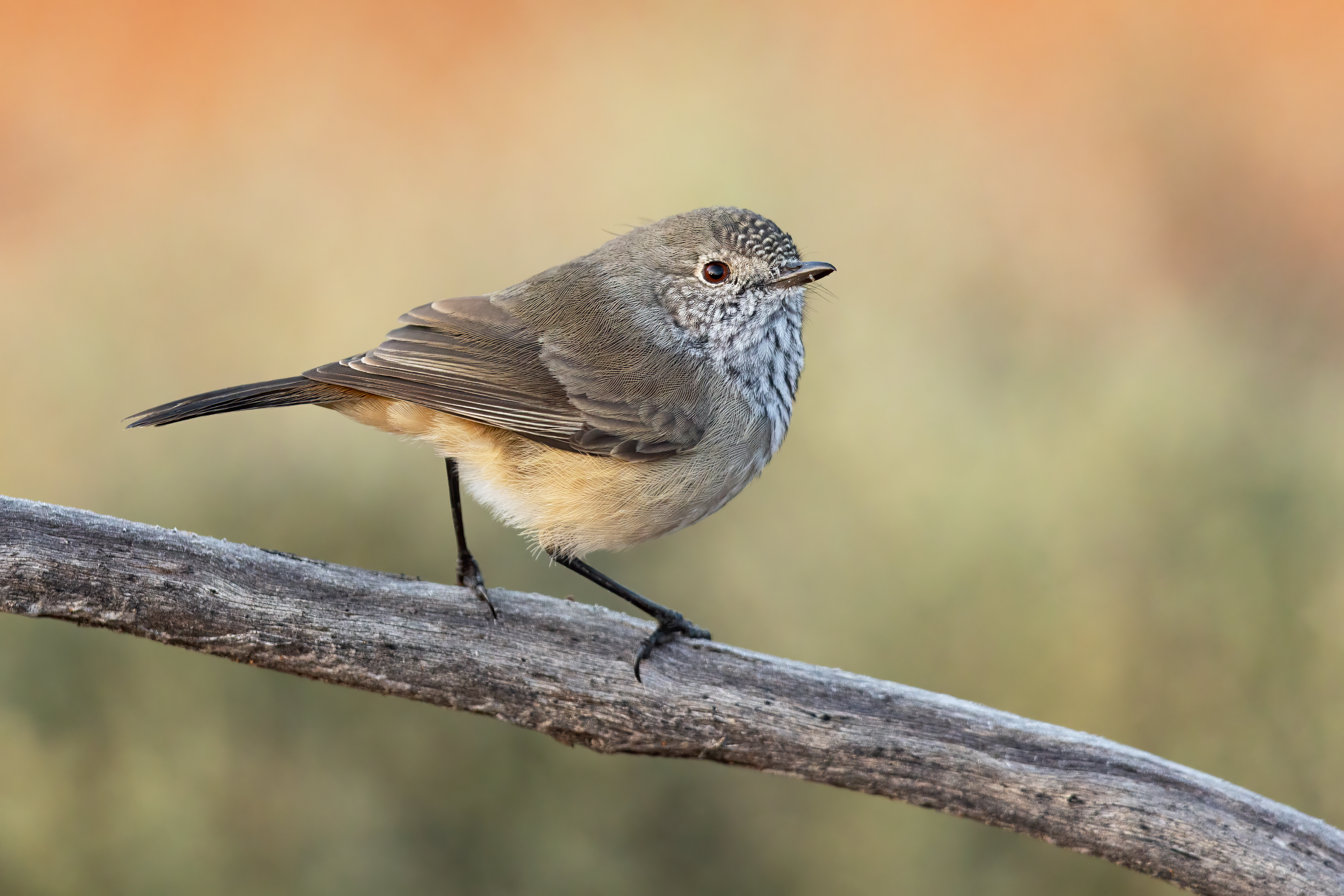
Inland thornbill

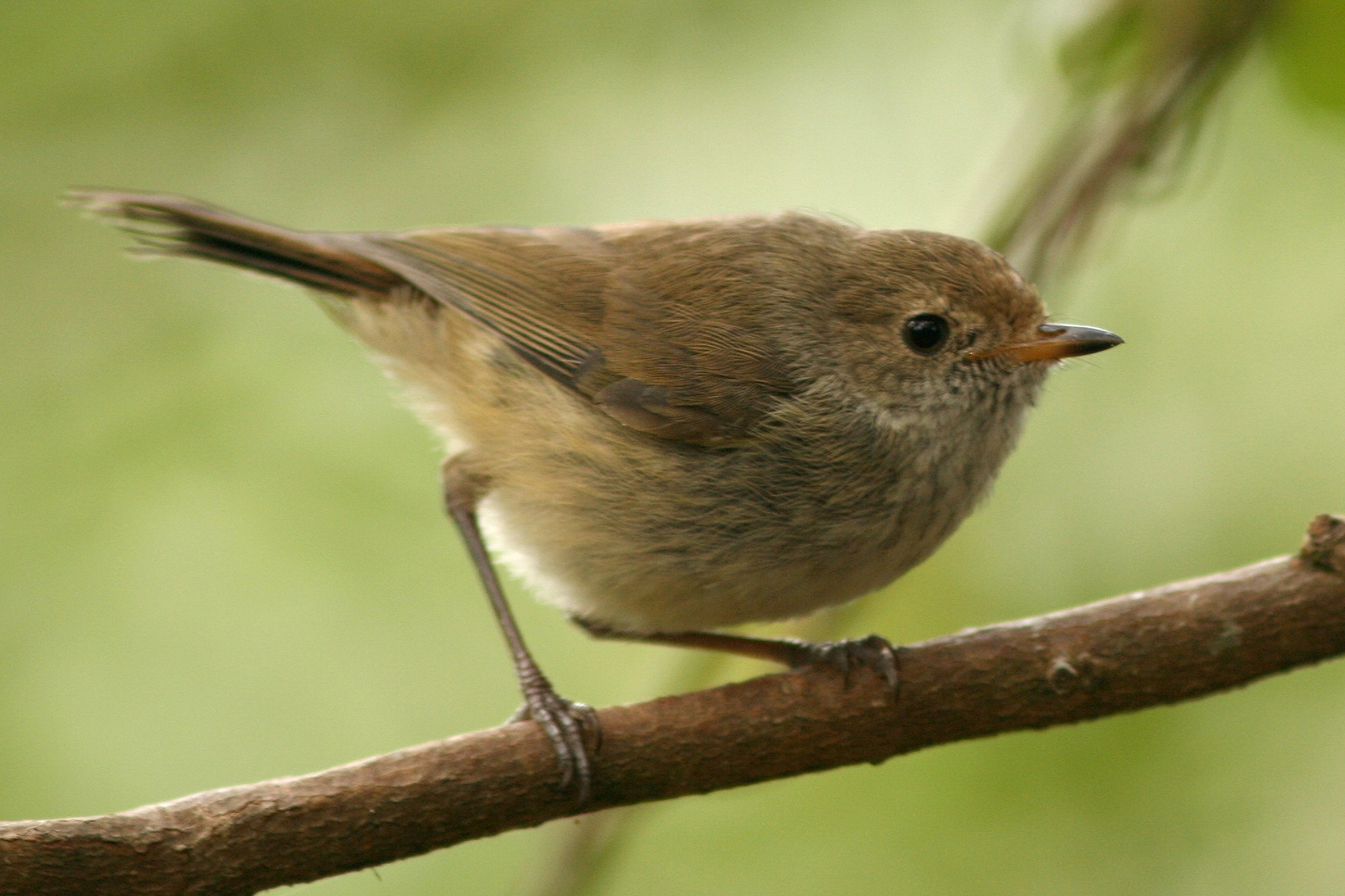
Brown thornbill

== Description ==
The inland thornbill is very similar to the brown thornbill (A. pusilla) in appearance, and these two species are sometimes considered conspecific. The brown thornbill is slightly smaller than the inland thornbill at approximately 10 cm (3.9 in) compared to 11.5 cm (4.5 in). The inland thornbill has white speckling on the forehead, while the brown thornbill has rufous speckling and is less grey than the inland thornbill. Range and habitat is the easiest way to differentiate these two species. Where both species occur in eastern Australia, the inland thornbill can be found in drier habitats than the brown thornbill; however, in southwestern Western Australia (outside of the brown thornbill's range) inland thornbill can be found in wetter forests.

Gould originally described the inland thornbill as having a larger and rounder tail, a broad and distinct band of black tipped with white across the ends of the tail feathers, and a larger overall size than other Acanthiza species. The inland thornbill has several calls similar to the brown thornbill and a high-pitched tsee-tsee. Inland thornbills have also been found to be proficient in mimicking the calls of other birds, such as the pied butcherbird (Cracticus nigrogularis), rufous whistler (Pachycephala rufiventris), bush stone-curlew (Burhinus grallarius), willie wagtail (Rhipidura leucophrys), grey fantail (Rhipidura albiscapa), and various cuckoos.

Inland thornbills are long-lived, with one instance of the same bird being retrapped and banded over seven years after the first occasion. A typical lifespan for an inland thornbill is 5.7 years.

== Ecology ==
=== Habitat and distribution ===
As the distribution range of the inland thornbills is wide, inland thornbills inhabit a variety of different habitat types. Inland thornbills inhabit arid woodlands and scrubs throughout Australia, including the mulga (Acacia aneura) of the Mallee and the Gibson Desert. Contrary to the common name, inland thornbills can also be found in mangrove forests in southwestern Western Australia and dense forests and coastal heaths. While the distribution range of inland thornbills is large, they are not a migratory species.

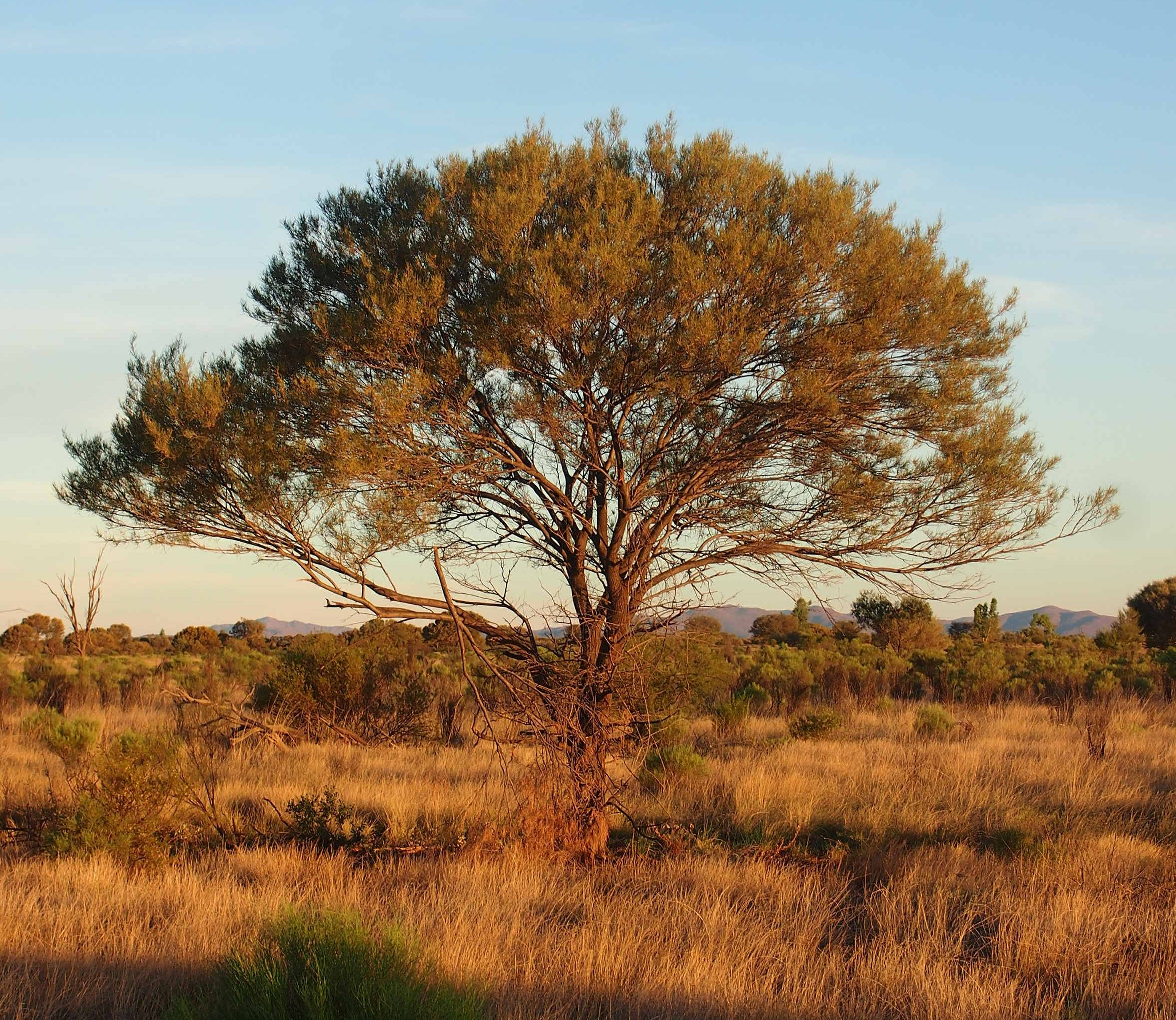
Mulga {Acacia aneura)

=== Feeding ===
Typically, inland thornbills do not feed on the ground but instead in foliage as shrubs-canopy or generalised feeders. Inland thornbills are known to forage in the foliage of trees and the dense understory of shrubs in small parties or pairs but have been known to feed with other small birds in a mixed flock. The typical diet of inland thornbills consists of spiders and other small insects.

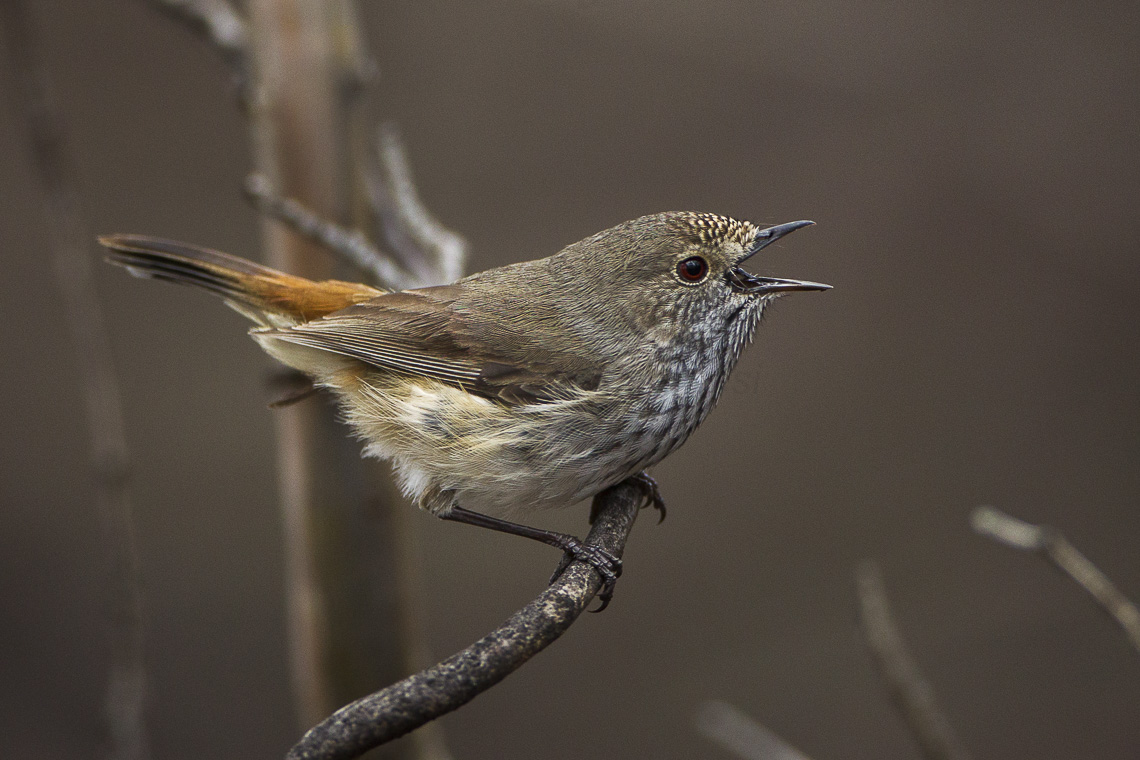
Inland thornbill, Wyperfeld National Park, Victoria

=== Breeding ===
The genus Acanthiza is native to New Guinea and Australia and comprises 12 sexually monomorphic species. The inland thornbill male is larger than the female. Some species of Acanthiza breed in pairs, while others are cooperative breeders. Inland thornbills are believed to breed in pairs as they are typically found alone or in pairs; this behaviour is similar to the known pair breeder, the brown thornbill. However, the ancestral breeding state for the genus Acanthiza and the tribe Acanthizini is cooperative breeding. Within the Acanthiza, on two separate occasions, pair breeding is believed to have evolved, but this is not believed to be due to environmental variables.

The nest of the inland thornbill is domed and is near the ground, nestled in a shrub. The nest is constructed of dry grass and bark fragments bound by cobwebs; near the top is a side entrance, and the nest is lined with feathers and soft grass. Inland thornbill breeding season is July to December with three white eggs with reddish freckles and blotches.

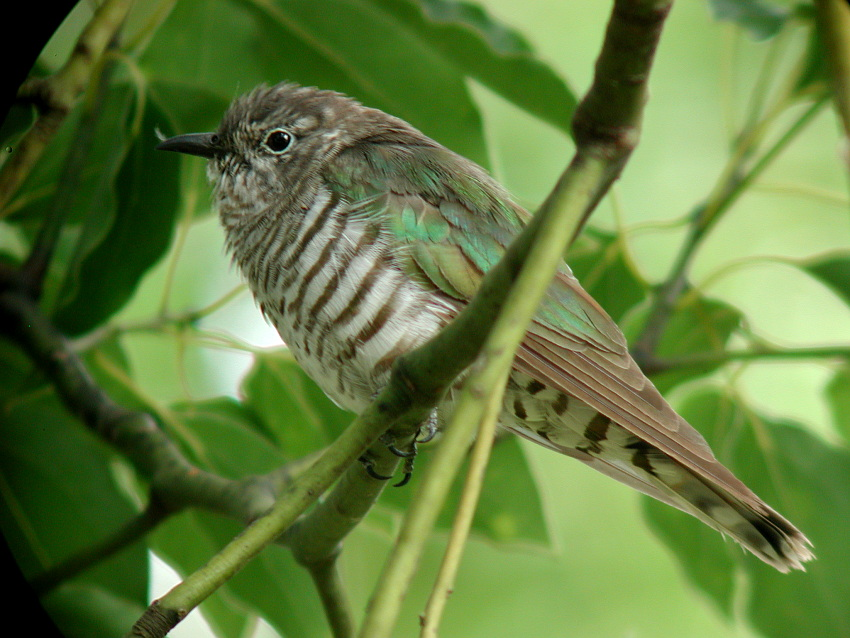
Shining bronze-cuckoo

=== Predators ===
Members of the genus Acanthiza and family Maluridae (Australasian wrens including the superb fairywren Malurus cyaneus) often foster the shining bronze-cuckoo (Chrysococcyx lucidus). The inland thornbill is also known to be parasitised by fan-tailed cuckoos (Cuculus pyrrhophanus). Inland thornbills are also susceptible to cat predation.

== Conservation ==
The IUCN Red List assessed inland thornbills as Least Concern on 01 October 2016. The justification was that the inland thornbill is not limited to a niche habitat and has a distribution range above the Vulnerable listing threshold. It is acknowledged that while the population trend of inland thornbills is decreasing, it is not rapidly approaching the >30% decline over three generations or ten years that would qualify Vulnerable due to population trend. Furthermore, while the exact population size of the inland thornbill is not quantified, it is believed to be greater than the threshold for Vulnerable status under the population size criterion.

Under the Nature Conservation Act 1992 in Queensland, the conservation status of the inland thornbill is Least Concern. Furthermore, the conservation status is secure in all states and territories where the inland thornbill can be found.

== Threats and human interaction ==
=== Habitat destruction ===
A definitive relationship between inland thornbills and habitat destruction is not clear. Some research suggests that inland thornbills have historically increased abundance when a jarrah wood forest is logged, but habitat trees are left after the logged area was burned. In comparison, other studies have found that inland thornbills struggle to recover after a wildfire or drought. One possible explanation for inhibited regeneration of the abundance of inland thornbills is poor powers of recolonisation. It is also possible that inland thornbills require less frequent fire events.

=== Poetry ===
Poet John Kinsella wrote a poem for the British magazine the New Statesman, titled "Inland Thornbills".
