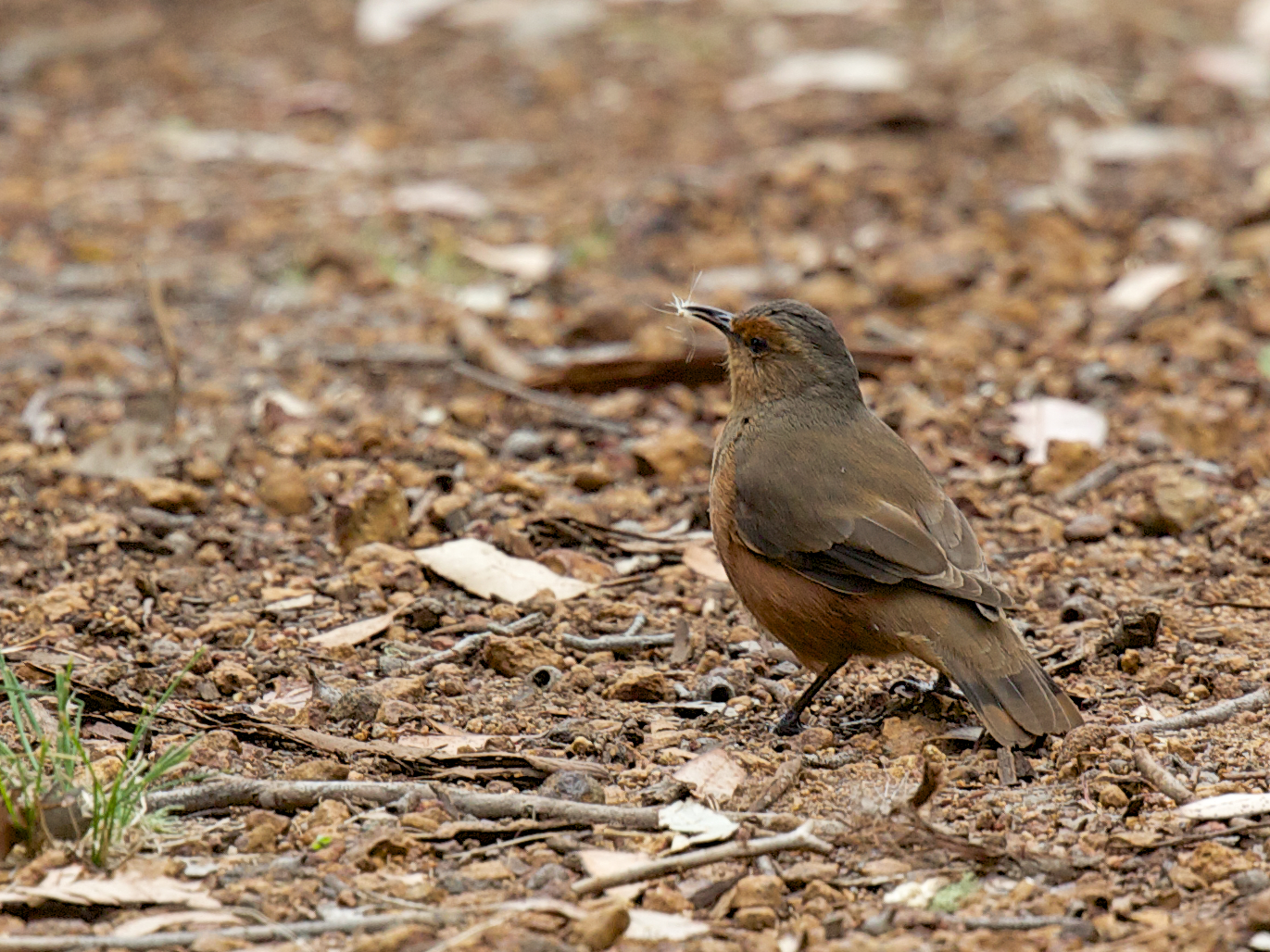

Conservation status
- Least Concern (IUCN 3.1)

Scientific classification
- Kingdom: Animalia
- Phylum: Chordata
- Class: Aves
- Order: Passeriformes
- Family: Climacteridae
- Genus: Climacteris
- Species: C. rufus

Binomial name
- Climacteris rufus Gould, 1841

= Rufous treecreeper =

Species of bird

The rufous treecreeper (Climacteris rufus) is a species of bird in the family Climacteridae. It is endemic to Southwestern Australia.

== Description ==
The rufous treecreeper measures between 15–17 centimetres (5.9–6.7 in) from bill to tail and weighs 27–37 grams (0.95–1.31 oz), with a wingspan of approximately 16–18 centimetres (6.3–7.1 in). It is gray with a rufous face and breast and brown back. The male has dark streaks on his breast while the female has pale streaks. Its mannerisms are similar to that of the Brown treecreeper. Juveniles typically have a darker face than adults, with a duller rufous-brown tint and the supercilium is barely noticeable.

== Diet ==
It forages on the trunks and branches of Eucalyptus trees for insects.

== Calls ==
Contact and territorial calls include a shrill peep, given at regular intervals.

== Breeding ==
They nest in tree hollows, laying a clutch of 1–3 spotted white eggs, measuring 24 x 19 mm. Nests are made from grass, bark, plants, and feathers. They are cooperative breeders, with all able family members helping to feed and raise the young. Breeding typically takes place during the spring.

A rufous treecreeper in Dryandra

== Distribution and habitat ==
The rufous treecreeper is found across Southwestern Australia, as far north as Shark Bay, and through to South Australia, as far east as the Eyre Peninsula. The population is heavily concentrated towards the wheatbelt and the south-west corner of Western Australia in and around Perth, becoming more dispersed further east and inland. Open eucalypt forest and woodland are its preferred habitat. It is the only treecreeper species found throughout most of its range.
