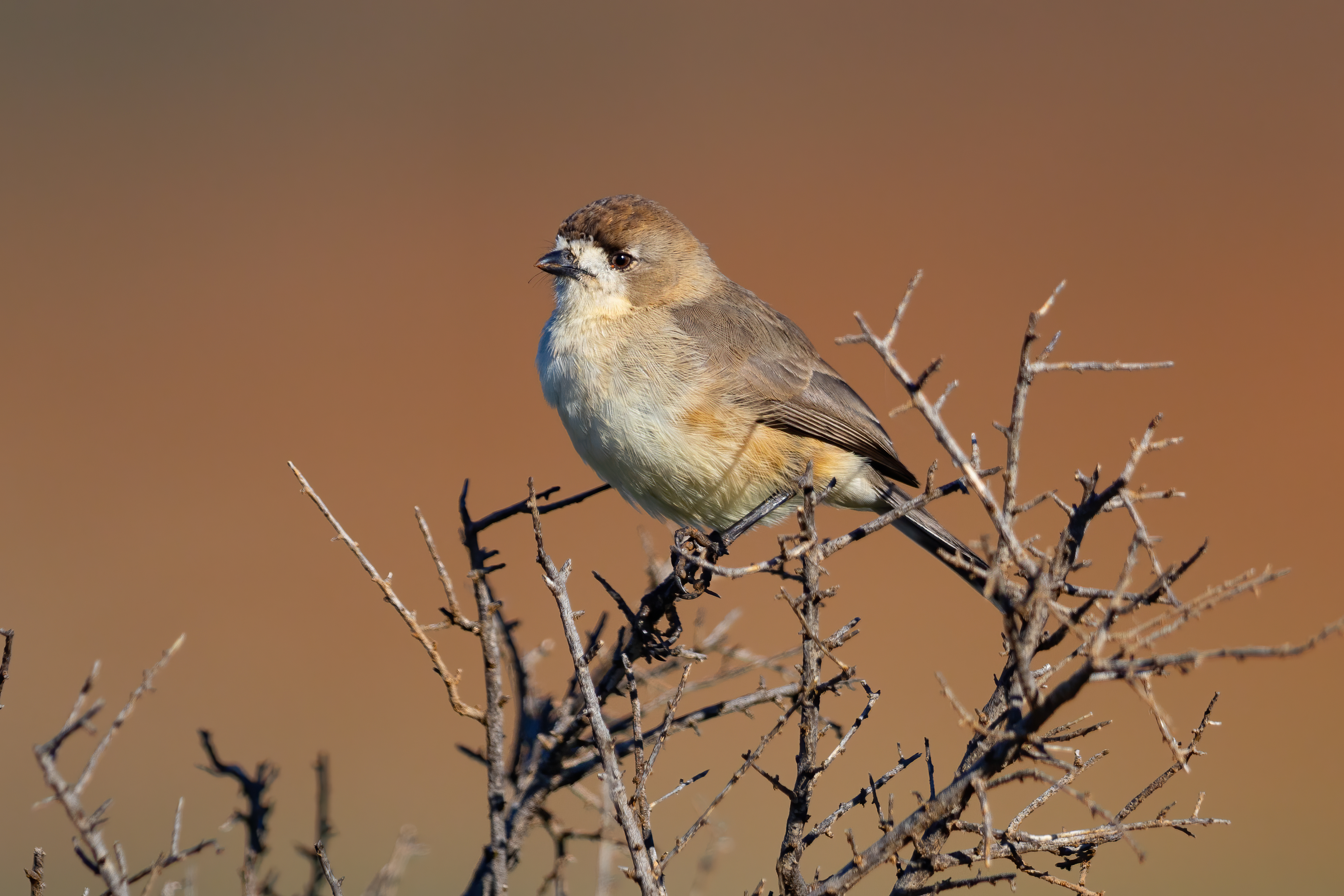

Conservation status
- Vulnerable (IUCN 3.1)

Scientific classification
- Kingdom: Animalia
- Phylum: Chordata
- Class: Aves
- Order: Passeriformes
- Family: Acanthizidae
- Genus: Aphelocephala
- Species: A. leucopsis

Binomial name
- Aphelocephala leucopsis (Gould, 1841)

Subspecies
- A. l. castaneiventris - (Milligan, 1903); A. l. leucopsis - (Gould, 1841)

= Southern whiteface =

Species of bird

The southern whiteface (Aphelocephala leucopsis) is a small passerine found in arid regions across most of the southern half of the Australian continent, excluding Tasmania. Superficially finch-like in appearance, this insectivorous bird is relatively common throughout most of its range, however, overall populations appear to be in decline.

== Taxonomy ==
Originally classified as genus Xerophila, the whitefaces were later reclassified when it was noted that a group of molluscs had already been ascribed that name and thus, are now listed as genus Aphelocephala. There are three species within the Aphelocephala, including the southern whiteface, banded whiteface (A. nigricincta) and chestnut-breasted whiteface (A. pectoralis). The generic name derives from the Ancient Greek apheles 'simple' and kephale 'head'. The specific epithet derives from Ancient Greek leukos 'white' and opsis 'face'. Recent phylogenetic study has found whitefaces to be most closely related to the scrubtit (Acanthornis magnus), a monotypic Tasmanian species similar in appearance to Sericornis scrubwrens. The marked difference in the size and shape of the whiteface beak compared with that of the scrubtit has been attributed to an increased dietary intake of seeds, requiring a more robust bill.

== Description ==
The southern whiteface is a stocky thornbill-like bird with a brown dorsum, white belly, dark brown wings and a black tail with narrow white tip. A grey wash on the belly is sometimes present, along with a grey or rufous tinge to the flanks. This species displays the characteristic facial markings of the genus; a white band across the forehead, with a darker streak along the top edge. Adult birds are approximately 11.5 cm (4.5 in) in length with a cream coloured eye, grey legs and a stubby dark grey bill of finch-like appearance. Adults are sexually monomorphic, while juveniles are distinguishable due to a lack of black rear band on the face. Call is a rapid, noisy twittering tchip-tchip-chiptchipt-chipt-chip or tzip-tzip-tziptzip and a harsher kzzurrk, kzzurrk-kzzurrk in alarm.

This species can be distinguished from other whiteface species by its somewhat duller appearance and lack of a breast band, which both the banded whiteface and chestnut-breasted whiteface possess.

The southern whiteface is a polytypic species with two recognised races:

- A. l. leucopsis; the nominate race found throughout south-eastern and central Australia. This race varies in the degree of grey colouration on the flanks, becoming progressively paler with north-westerly distribution. The pale form was previously considered a separate race; whitei.
- A. l. castaneiventris; found in south Western Australia, this race is distinguishable by a rufous wash to its flanks.

== Distribution and habitat ==
The southern whiteface is endemic to Australia and typically inhabits arid open woodlands with a shrubby or grassy understory, as well as grass plains throughout much of the continents south. Not present in Tasmania or in coastal areas of the mainland, this species prefers Acacia woodlands, particularly those dominated by mulga and drought-resistant chenopod shrub species, including saltbush and bluebush. They are considered sedentary; however, atlas records indicate that individuals may move into wetter areas outside of their normal range during drought years.

== Behaviour ==
=== Diet and foraging ===
Southern whiteface feed primarily on arthropods; particularly insect and arachnid species, but also take seeds and leaves. They forage almost exclusively on the ground, favouring habitat with low tree densities, a herb understory and without large amounts of litter cover. When foraging on ground substrates, southern whiteface preferentially make use of ground litter, herbs and bare ground over grass and substrates above ground level (e.g., tree trunks, branches and canopy) and obtain their insectivorous prey exclusively by gleaning.

Although southern whiteface typically forage in small groups of 2-8 individuals, they may congregate in larger flocks during the non-breeding season, with as many as 70 birds recorded in foraging parties in winter. They often also participate in mixed species feeding flocks, particularly with other whiteface and thornbill species.

=== Breeding ===
Breeds once or twice a year from July to October throughout most of its range; however, timing of breeding in this species can be affected by rainfall in arid regions. May breed outside of their usual season following sufficient rainfall, or may not breed at all in years of drought. Little is known about bonding in this species and although nesting is often observed in pairs, there have been multiple occurrences of co-operative breeding recorded, with up to 4 adults participating in chick rearing.

=== Nesting ===
Builds a domed nest with a side entrance, using dry grasses or bark and lining with feathers or fur. Nests are often placed in shrubs or tree hollows and can range in height from less than 1m from the ground, to greater than 10 m (33 ft). Eggs are a dull white or buff colour with brown blotching at the larger end, oval in shape and about 18 mm × 14 mm (0.71 in × 0.55 in) in size. Clutches usually consist of 3-4 eggs. Length of incubation period is unknown, but young are altricial and fledge between 14 and 19 days after hatching.

== Conservation ==
Although locally common and currently listed on the IUCN Red List as vulnerable, atlas records of southern whiteface have declined by 43% in recent years. The suitability of habitat for ground-foraging woodland species, such as the southern whiteface, is thought to depend on the variety of available ground substrates. As many types of ground cover are vulnerable to disturbance from fire (leaf litter, fallen branches), grazing (grass, herbs) and introduction of exotic plant species (open ground), the management of existing habitat has important conservation implications for this species. Understory disturbance by grazing and clearance of habitat for agriculture are currently listed as the main threats to southern whiteface. However, some studies suggest that mining operations may also impact negatively on the species, although the exact cause for their decline (e.g. habitat degradation, noise disturbance, exposure to pollutants) in mining areas is unknown.
