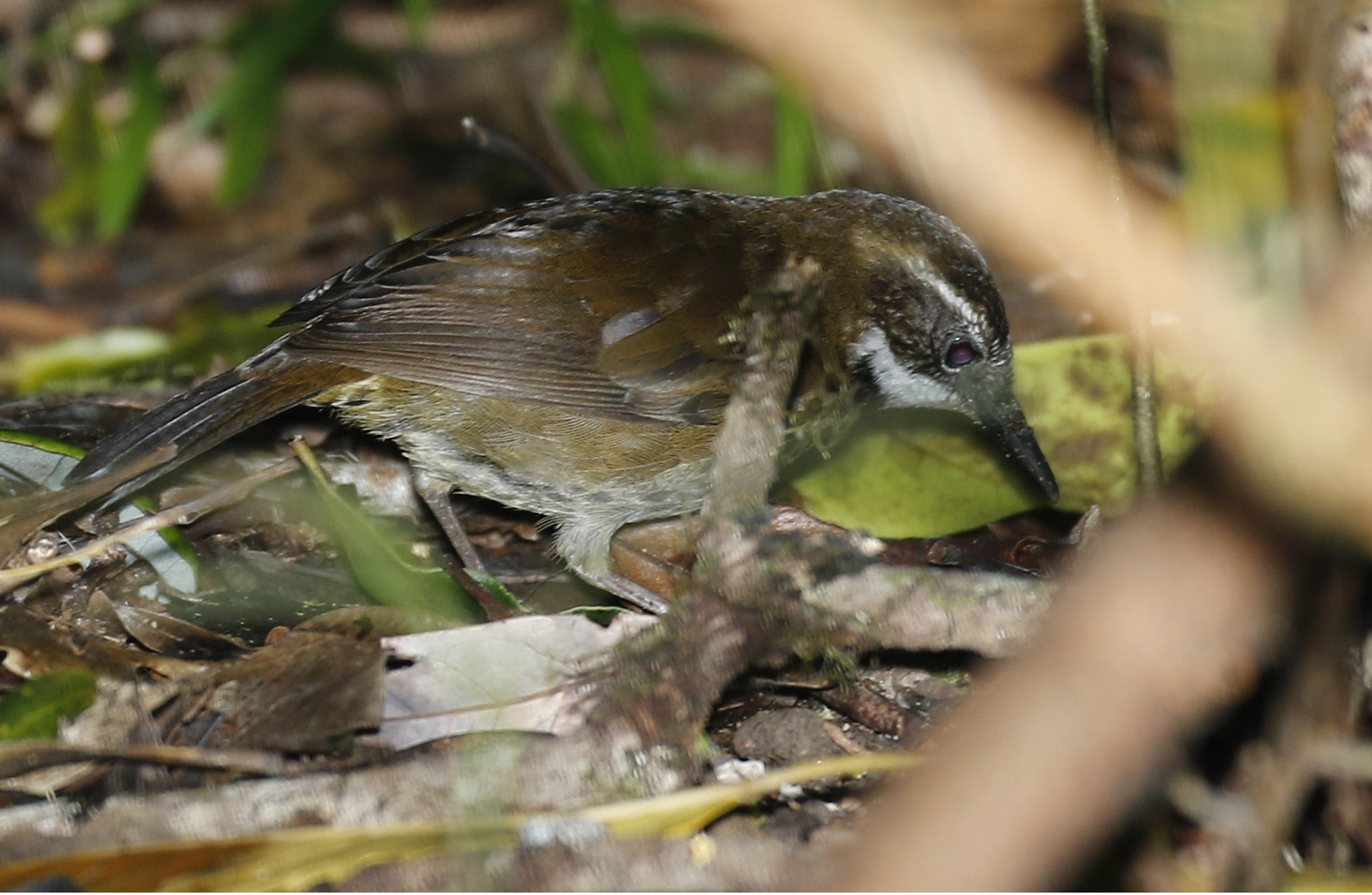

Conservation status
- Endangered (IUCN 3.1)

Scientific classification
- Kingdom: Animalia
- Phylum: Chordata
- Class: Aves
- Order: Passeriformes
- Family: Acanthizidae
- Genus: Oreoscopus; North, 1905
- Species: O. gutturalis

Binomial name
- Oreoscopus gutturalis (De Vis, 1889)
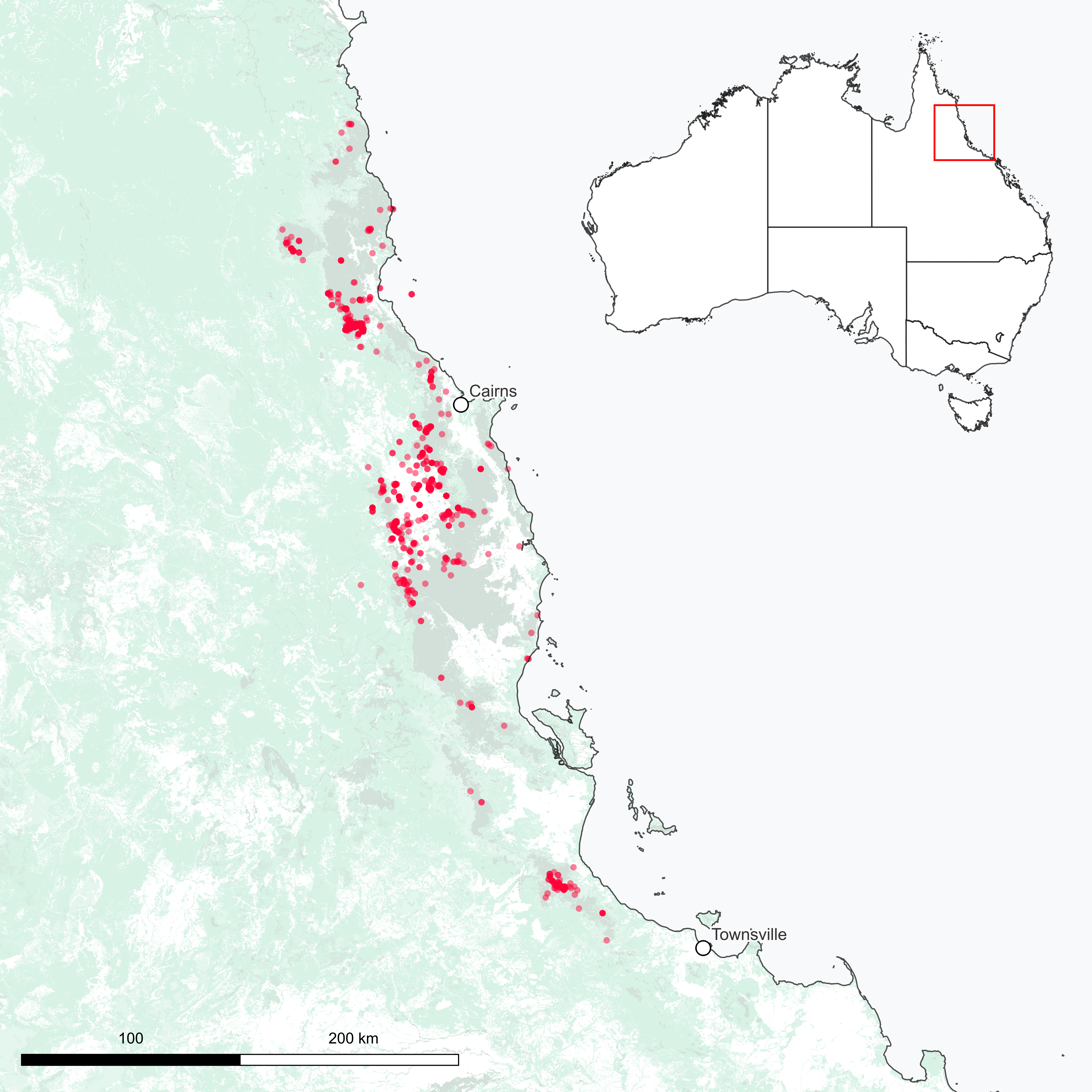
- Species distribution

= Fernwren =

Species of bird

The fernwren (Oreoscopus gutturalis) is a species of bird in the family Acanthizidae. It is monotypic within the genus Oreoscopus.

It is endemic to northern Queensland in Australia. Its natural habitats are tropical moist lowland forest and tropical moist montane forest.

== Taxonomy ==
The fernwren was first described by the English zoologist and ornithologist Charles Walter De Vis in 1889, and grouped with the scrubwrens as Sericornis gutturalis. It was later included in the genus Crateroscelis, along with three species of mouse-warblers found in New Guinea, but was subsequently moved to the monotypic genus Oreoscopus (established by North in 1905). The fernwren is a basal (subfamily) member of Acanthizidae and sister to the genus Pachycare.

The generic name Oreoscopus derives from the Ancient Greek oros meaning 'mountain' and scopos meaning 'guardian' or 'watcher'. The specific epithet gutturalis is Mediaeval Latin for 'of the throat', referring to the prominent white throat of this species. It was also known colloquially as the collared scrubwren.

== Description ==
The fernwren has a white eyebrow and throat, enclosing a dark brown face. Beneath the white throat, it has a black bib. It has a long-slender bill. The upperparts are dark olive-brown and the underparts paler. It is 12–14 cm (4.7–5.5 in) in length. The female is very similar to the male. Juveniles are dark brown without the white facial markings of the adult.

== Distribution and habitat ==
The fernwren is found in northeast Queensland rainforest between 300–1,500 m (980–4,920 ft) above sea-level, although more often above 650 m (2,130 ft). It is found in the Paluma Range, near Townsville, and from the Tully Gorge National Park northwards to Cape Tribulation. It is sedentary and classified as endangered on the IUCN Red List.

== Behaviour ==
The fernwren forages in the moist leaf-litter amongst the ferns and dense shrubbery, particularly in shady gullies of highland rainforests. As it searches through the accumulated debris of the forest floor, it frequently bows its head and flicks its short tail. It feeds on arthropods and small skinks (Scincidae). It has a variety of calls, including high-pitched squeaks and whistles, a softer chattering sequence, and a buzzing, scolding call.

== Breeding ==
In the breeding season from July to January (mainly October and November), the male and female fernwrens together construct a domed nest, often hidden beneath an overhanging bank, fallen log or in a small cave amid the ferns. The nest is composed of twigs, rootlets, moss, and lichen. The female lays a clutch of two eggs, which are glossy white, sometimes finely spotted chestnut and tan. The eggs measure 22 mm (0.87 in) long by 17 mm (0.67 in) wide. Incubation by the female lasts about 29 days, and nestlings are fed by both sexes for 21-23 days.
