= Rusty mouse-warbler =

Conservation status
- Least Concern (IUCN 3.1)

Scientific classification
- Kingdom: Animalia
- Phylum: Chordata
- Class: Aves
- Order: Passeriformes
- Family: Acanthizidae
- Genus: Origma
- Species: O. murina

Binomial name
- Origma murina (Sclater, PL, 1858)

Subspecies
- O. m. murina (Sclater, PL, 1858); O. m. monacha (Gray, GR, 1858); O. m. pallida (Rand, 1938); O. m. capitalis (Stresemann & Paludan, 1932)

Synonyms
- Crateroscelis murina

Species of bird

The rusty mouse-warbler (Origma murina), is a species of bird in the family Acanthizidae. It is found in Indonesia and Papua New Guinea, in a 1,270,000 km² distribution. Its natural habitats are subtropical or tropical moist lowland forests and subtropical or tropical moist montane forests.

This species was formerly placed in the genus Crateroscelis, but following the publication of a molecular phylogenetic study of the scrubwrens and mouse-warblers in 2018, it was moved to the genus Origma.
