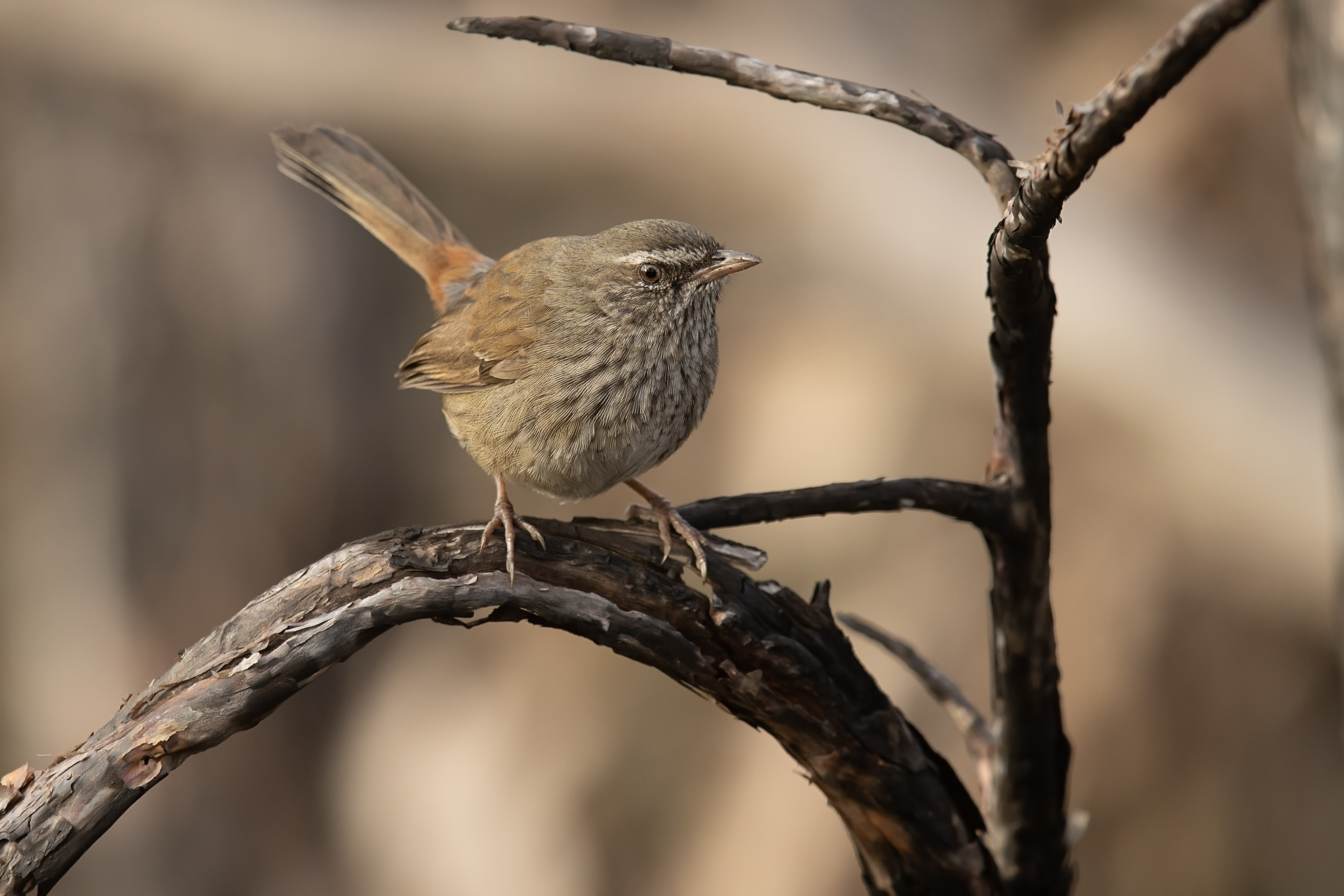

Conservation status
- Least Concern (IUCN 3.1)

Scientific classification
- Kingdom: Animalia
- Phylum: Chordata
- Class: Aves
- Order: Passeriformes
- Family: Acanthizidae
- Genus: Hylacola
- Species: H. pyrrhopygia

Binomial name
- Hylacola pyrrhopygia (Vigors & Horsfield, 1827)

Subspecies
- H. p. pyrrhopygia - (Vigors & Horsfield, 1827); H. p. parkeri - (Schodde & Mason, IJ, 1999); H. p. pedleri - (Schodde & Mason, IJ, 1999)

Synonyms
- Calamanthus pyrrhopygia pyrrhopygia Christidis and Boles (2008); Hylacola pyrrhopygius pyrrhopygius Sibley and Monroe (1990, 1993)

= Chestnut-rumped heathwren =

Species of bird

The chestnut-rumped heathwren (Hylacola pyrrhopygia) is a species of bird in the family Acanthizidae. It is endemic to temperate and subtropical forests and heathlands of Australia.

== Taxonomy ==
The chestnut-rumped heathwren was first described by the Irish zoologist Nicholas Aylward Vigors and the American physician and naturalist Thomas Horsfield in 1827. The generic name Hylacola derives from the Greek hylē 'woodland' and the Latin -cola 'dweller'. The specific epithet pyrrhopygia derives from Greek pyrrhos 'flame-coloured, red' and pyge 'rump'. It is also known colloquially as the scrub warbler. There are three subspecies: Hylacola pyrrhopygia pyrrhopygia in New South Wales and Victoria; H. p. parkeri in the Mt Lofty Ranges of South Australia; and H. p. pedleri in the southern Flinders Ranges of South Australia.

== Description ==
The chestnut-rumped heathwren is a small bushland bird with an olive-brown back with conspicuous reddish-brown rump and tail coverts. It has a streaked brown-on-white chest and the belly and rear flanks are grey-buff. There is a dark subterminal band with a white tip on the usually erect tail. Both sexes have a dull white eyebrow; eyes are yellow, while bill, legs, and feet are grey. There are only small differences between the subspecies that are not easily recognised in the field. It measures 14 cm (5.5 in) in length.

== Distribution and habitat ==
The chestnut-rumped heathwren occurs in southeastern Australia from the Granite Belt of southeast Queensland through eastern New South Wales, Victoria, and southeast South Australia. In Victoria, it ranges inland to the Grampians and Bendigo region, but is more usual in coastal parts. In New South Wales, it occurs inland as far as the Warrumbungles and Temora. Scattered populations occur in the Flinders and Mt Lofty Ranges, and the Fleurieu Peninsula of South Australia. Its preferred habitats are heaths of coastal, mountain and hinterland areas, and the dense undergrowth of forests and woodland. It is sedentary and uncommon within its range.

== Behaviour and breeding ==
The chestnut-rumped heathwren is usually shy and secretive until the breeding season from July to November, when both sexes will sing from a perch on a bush, though still staying partly concealed. Its song is a rich, melodious warbling chi-chi-tu-weet, kwe-reep, and suchlike notes in great variety, blended with mimicry of other birds. It also makes a harsh or scolding zeet on contact or alarm. The chestnut-rumped heathwren builds a domed or globular nest on or near the ground in tussocks or dense shrubs. The nest is composed of dry grass stems, bark fibre and rootlets, often appearing untidy. A clutch of three or four eggs is laid and usually incubated by the female for 14-16 days. The eggs, measuring 20 by 15 mm (0.79 by 0.59 in), are salmon-pink, freckled with light chocolate-brown, more so at the larger end.

== Diet and foraging ==
The chestnut-rumped heathwren forages singly, in pairs or small parties, occasionally with mixed species flocks of other Acanthiza species and variegated fairywrens (Malurus lamberti). Its diet consists of arthropods, including flies (Diptera), spiders (Araneae), moths and their larvae (Lepidoptera), ants (Formicidae), cicadas (Cicadidae), and cockroach egg-sacs (Blattodea). It also eats the seeds of various grass species.

== Conservation ==
Although the population of chestnut heathwrens is declining, the species is currently classified as Least Concern by the IUCN. However, it is listed as Endangered in South Australia and Vulnerable in Victoria, with continued fragmentation and loss of habitat, and predation by introduced predators, being regarded as the main pressures.
