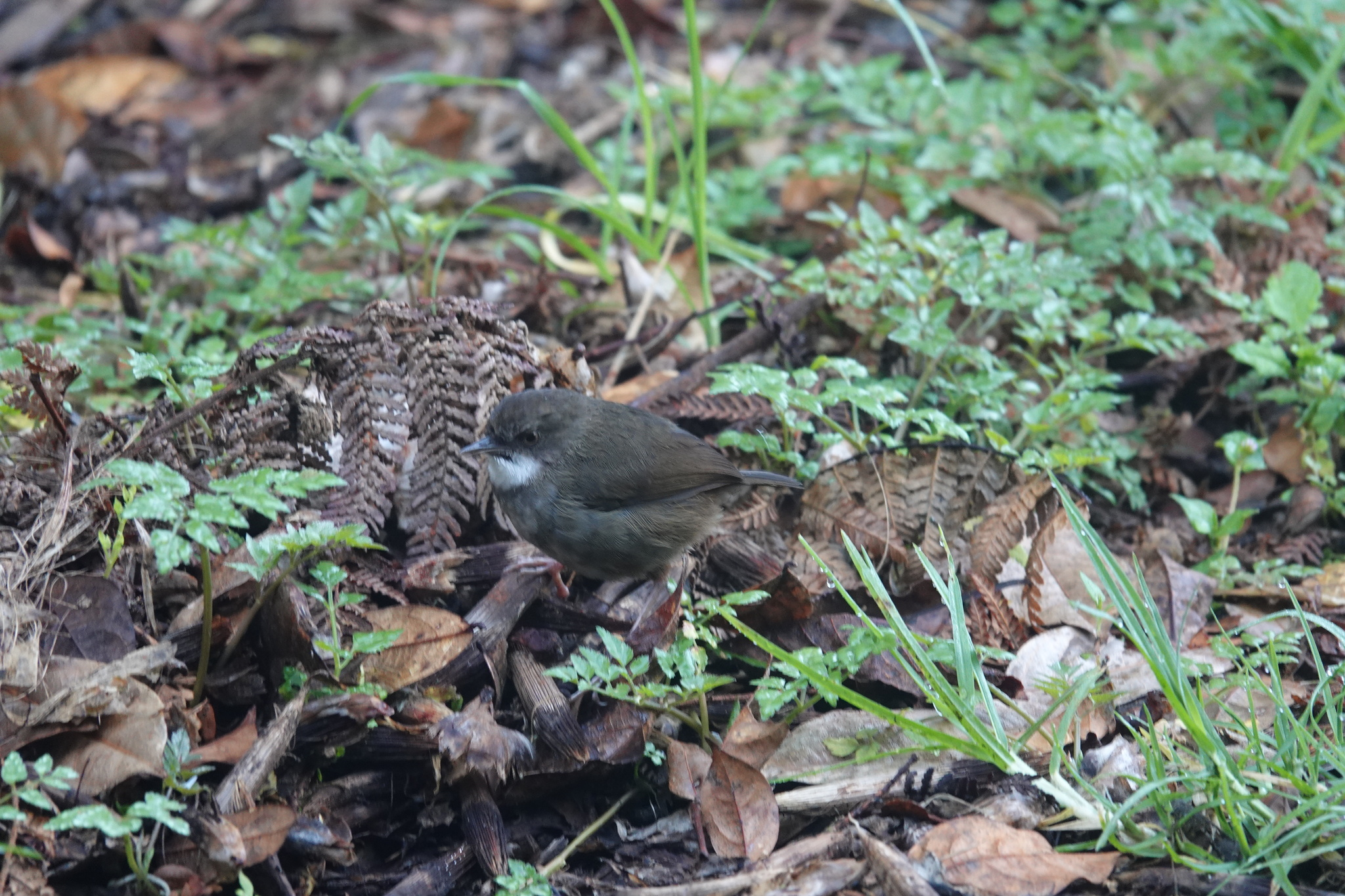

Conservation status
- Least Concern (IUCN 3.1)

Scientific classification
- Kingdom: Animalia
- Phylum: Chordata
- Class: Aves
- Order: Passeriformes
- Family: Acanthizidae
- Genus: Origma
- Species: O. robusta

Binomial name
- Origma robusta (De Vis, 1898)

Synonyms
- Crateroscelis robusta

= Mountain mouse-warbler =

Species of bird

The mountain mouse-warbler (Origma robusta) is a species of bird in the family Acanthizidae. It is found in Indonesia and Papua New Guinea, where its natural habitat is subtropical or tropical moist montane forests.

This species was formerly placed in the genus Crateroscelis, but following the publication of a molecular phylogenetic study of the scrubwrens and mouse-warblers in 2018, it was moved to the genus Origma.

== Taxonomy ==
Origma robusta includes the following subspecies:

- Origma robusta peninsularis - (Hartert, 1930)
- Origma robusta bastille - (Diamond, 1969)
- Origma robusta diamondi - (Beehler & Prawiradilaga, 2010)
- Origma robusta deficiens - (Hartert, 1930)
- Origma robusta sanfordi - (Hartert, 1930)
- Origma robusta robusta - (De Vis, 1898)
