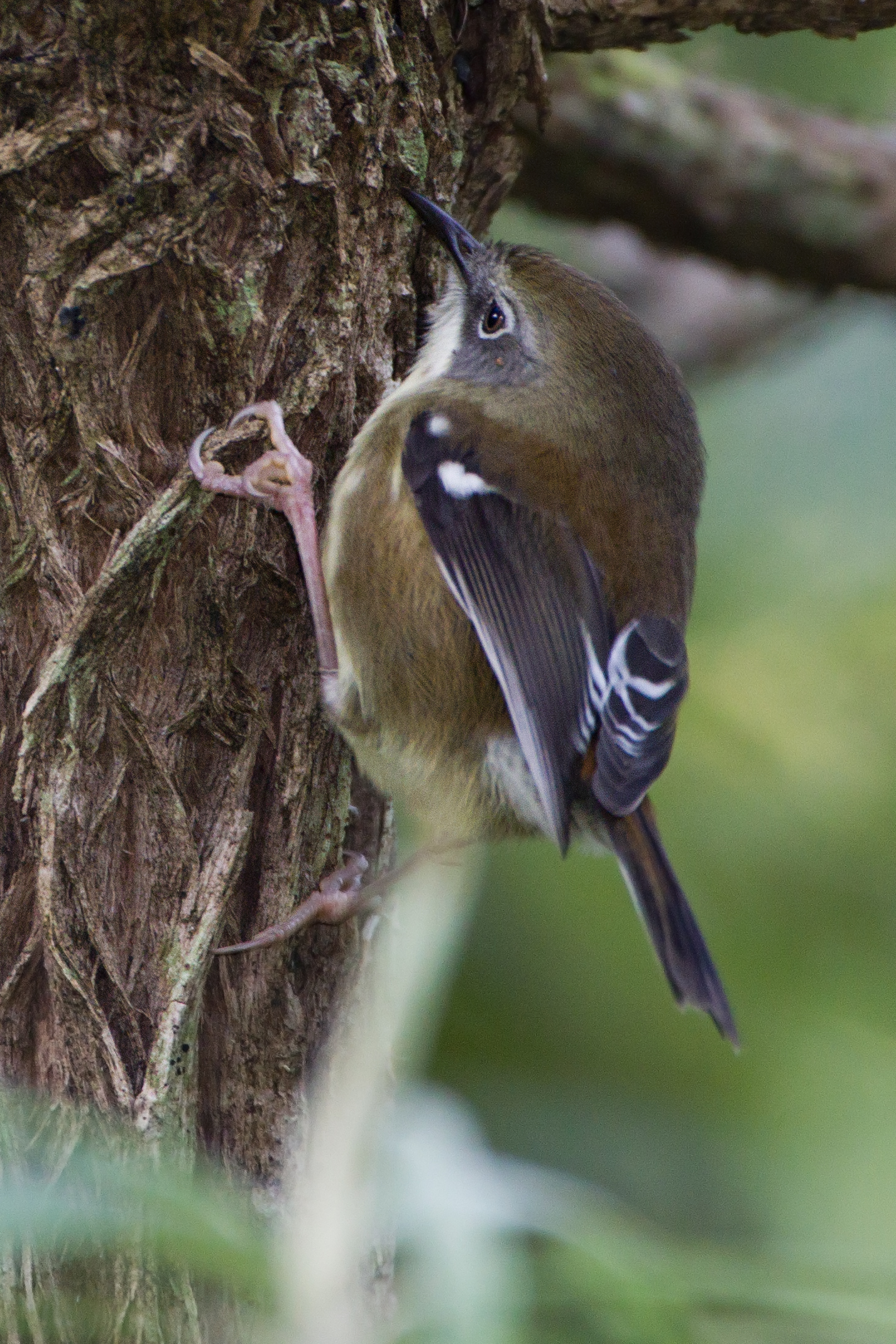

Conservation status
- Least Concern (IUCN 3.1)

Scientific classification
- Kingdom: Animalia
- Phylum: Chordata
- Class: Aves
- Order: Passeriformes
- Family: Acanthizidae
- Genus: Acanthornis; Legge, 1887
- Species: A. magna

Binomial name
- Acanthornis magna (Gould, 1855)

Subspecies
- A. m. magna - (Gould, 1855); A. m. greeniana - Schodde & Mason, IJ, 1999

Synonyms
- Acanthornis magnus

= Scrubtit =

Species of bird

The scrubtit (Acanthornis magna) is a species of bird in the thornbill family Acanthizidae. It is endemic to Tasmania and King Island in Australia. Its natural habitat is the temperate rainforest, Nothofagus beech forest and eucalypt woodland. It is a small species that resembles the Sericornis scrubwrens (with which it was once placed).

== Taxonomy ==
The scrubtit belongs to the monotypic genus Acanthornis. A 2017 genetic study using both mitochondrial and nuclear DNA found the ancestor of the scrubtit diverged from that of the three whitefaces of the genus Aphelocephala around 7 million years ago. The combined lineage had diverged from the thornbill lineage around 13 million years ago.

== Description ==
The scrubtit is 11 to 12 centimetres (4.33 to 4.72 in) long and weighs around 10 grams (0.35 oz). The plumage consists of a white throat and belly, a brown back, crown, flank and tail, black wings and grey on the face. The eye is pale and the bill is short, black and slightly curved. The species is often silent, but makes quite loud contact calls and has a song described as "sweet [and] musical".

== Behaviour ==
The scrubtit forages individually, in pairs or in small family groups near the ground in dense cover. It feeds on small invertebrates, particularly insects and their eggs. The species will associate with mixed-species feeding flocks. The species is territorial and monogamous, with the breeding season lasting from September to January. The nest is a woven globe with a side entrance, lined with feathers and fur, camouflaged and usually found between 1–3 m off the ground. The clutch size is usually three eggs but sometimes four. The eggs measure 18 by 15 millimetres (0.71 by 0.59 in) and are pearly white, with fine reddish spots, mostly around the larger end. No information exists about incubation or nestling times. Both parents feed the chicks in the nest, but unlike many Australian passerines helpers have never been reported. The species is victim to brood parasitism by fan-tailed cuckoos (Cacomantis flabelliformis) and shining bronze-cuckoos (Chrysococcyx lucidus), and quolls (Dasyurus) also take eggs and nestlings. The species is shy and unobtrusive and is seldom observed by people.

== Conservation status ==
The species has a restricted range but is not considered threatened by the IUCN. The subspecies found on King Island (A. m. greeniana) is considered critically endangered, however. A 2018 study ranked this subspecies third as the Australian bird most likely to go extinct.
