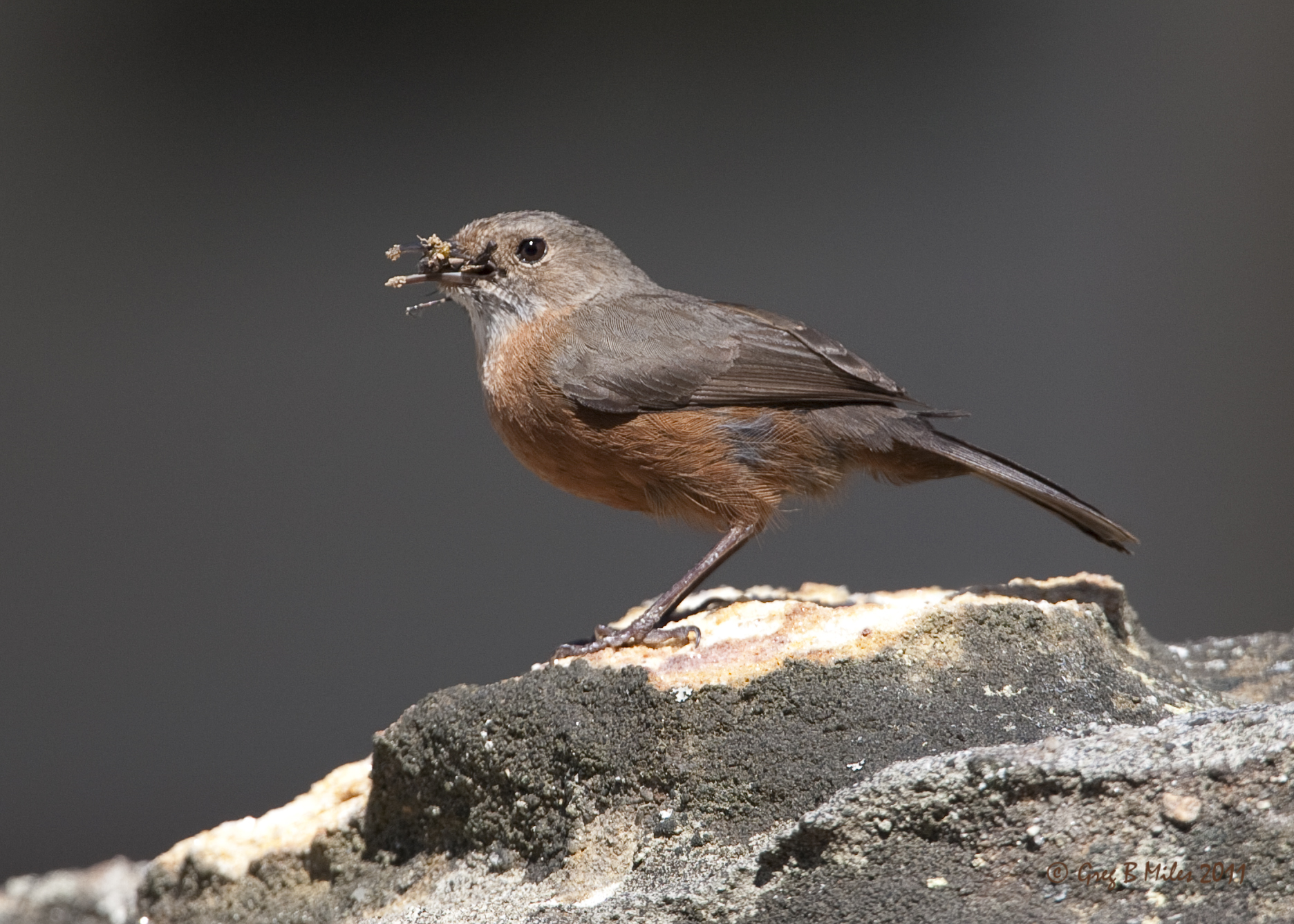
- Rockwarbler, Origma solitaria

Scientific classification
- Kingdom: Animalia
- Phylum: Chordata
- Class: Aves
- Order: Passeriformes
- Family: Acanthizidae
- Genus: Origma; Gould, 1838

Type species
- Sylvia solitaria Lewin, 1808

= Origma =

Genus of birds in the family Acanthizidae

Origma is a genus of passerine birds in the family Acanthizidae.

A molecular phylogenetic study of the scrubwrens and mouse-warblers published in 2018 led to a revision of the taxonomic classification. The genus Origma had previously contained only a single species, the rockwarbler, but in the reorganisation two additional species from the genus Crateroscelis were added. The rockwarbler diverged from the common ancestor of the other two species—the mousewarblers of New Guinea—around 9 million years ago.

The genus contains three species:

- Rockwarbler, Origma solitaria
- Rusty mouse-warbler, Origma murina – previously placed in Crateroscelis
- Mountain mouse-warbler, Origma robusta – previously placed in Crateroscelis
