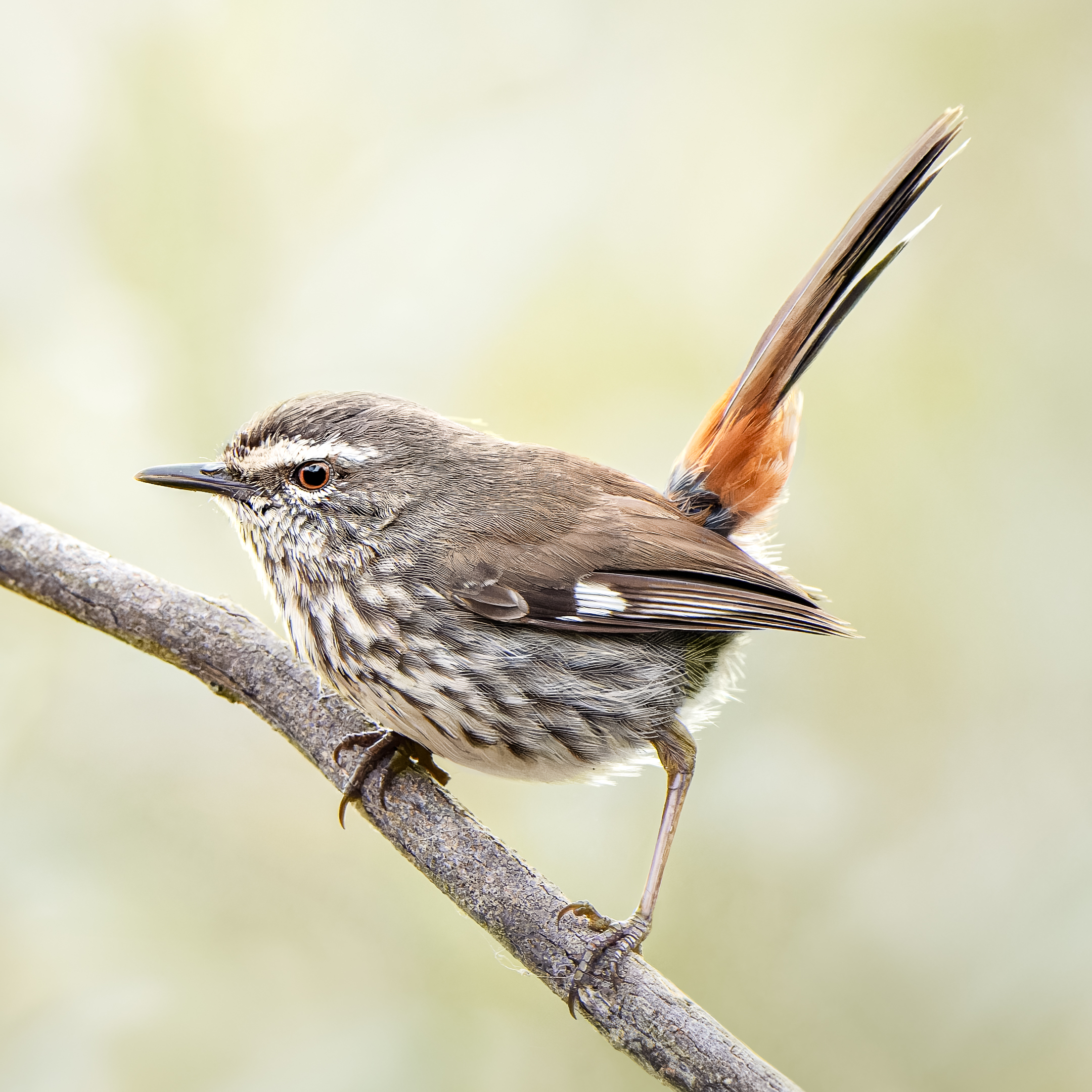

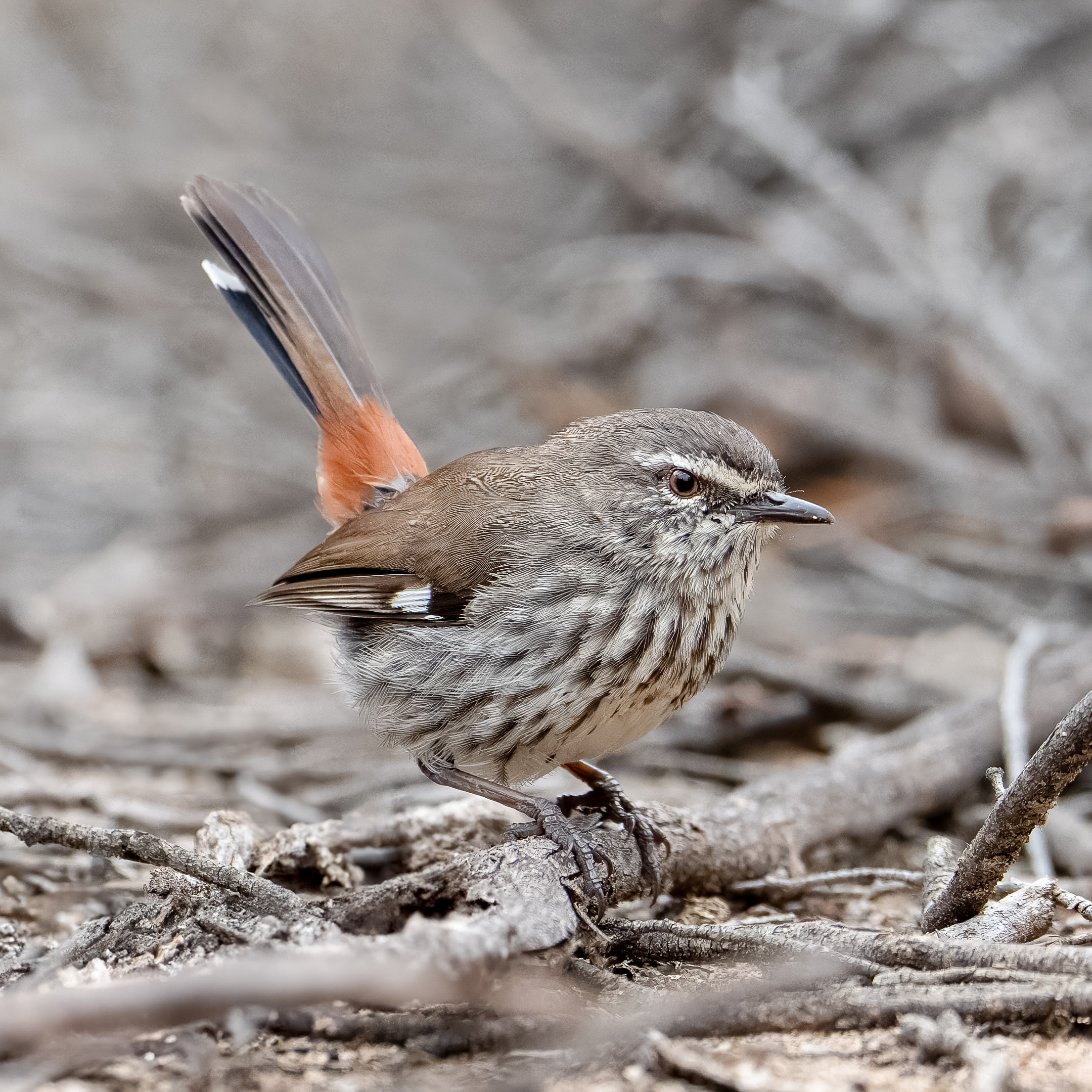

Conservation status
- Least Concern (IUCN 3.1)

Scientific classification
- Kingdom: Animalia
- Phylum: Chordata
- Class: Aves
- Order: Passeriformes
- Family: Acanthizidae
- Genus: Hylacola
- Species: H. cauta

Binomial name
- Hylacola cauta Gould, 1843

Subspecies
- H. c. macrorhyncha - (Schodde & Mason, IJ, 1999); H. c. cauta - Gould, 1843; H. c. halmaturina - (Mathews, 1912); H. c. whitlocki - (Mathews, 1912)

Synonyms
- Calamanthus cautus Hylacola cautus Sericornis cautus

= Shy heathwren =

Species of bird

The shy heathwren (Hylacola cauta) is a species of small bird in the family Acanthizidae, endemic to Australia. They inhabit mostly mallee woodland that has relatively dense shrub and heath understorey.

== Taxonomy ==
Their taxonomic name was formerly Calamanthus cautus—classing them as fieldwrens—until they were renamed in 2008. The generic name Hylacola derives from the Greek hylē 'woodland' and the Latin -cola 'dweller'. The specific epithet derives from the Latin cautus 'shy, wary'. Common names for the species include shy hylacola and mallee heathwren. Four subspecies have been recognised: the nominate subspecies Hylacola cauta cauta in South Australia and Victoria; H. c. macrorhynchus in New South Wales; H. c. halmaturina on Kangaroo Island; and H. c. whitlocki in Western Australia.

== Description ==
The birds are cock-tailed with a chestnut rump that darkens towards the tip. Their feathers are white with brown streaking underneath and greyish-brown on the back and crown. They have a white eyebrow, tail tip and patch on the flight feathers, and a black bill. Their eyes are brown to yellowish-brown and legs are slate-brown. Females have slightly duller colouring, and immature birds are duller again with some of these being fawn-coloured underneath. They have a total length when adults of 12–14 cm (4.7–5.5 in).

== Distribution and threats ==
They are uncommon residents across a wide part of southern Australia. Ranging from near West Wyalong in New South Wales to the Murchison River in Western Australia. In New South Wales, they are found in two isolated populations: one between Leeton, Willandra National Park, Nymagee and West Wyalong; and the other from Balranald to Trentham Cliffs. Within the state they are seen as a threatened and vulnerable, largely due to human-wrought habitat loss, and predation by foxes and cats.

== Behaviour ==
=== Diet ===
Shy heathwrens feed mostly on ground-dwelling insects, and rarely on seeds.

=== Nesting ===
Their ground-level nests are dome-shaped and usually concealed within grass tussocks or shrubs. They typically lay 2 or 3 freckled and pinkish eggs.
