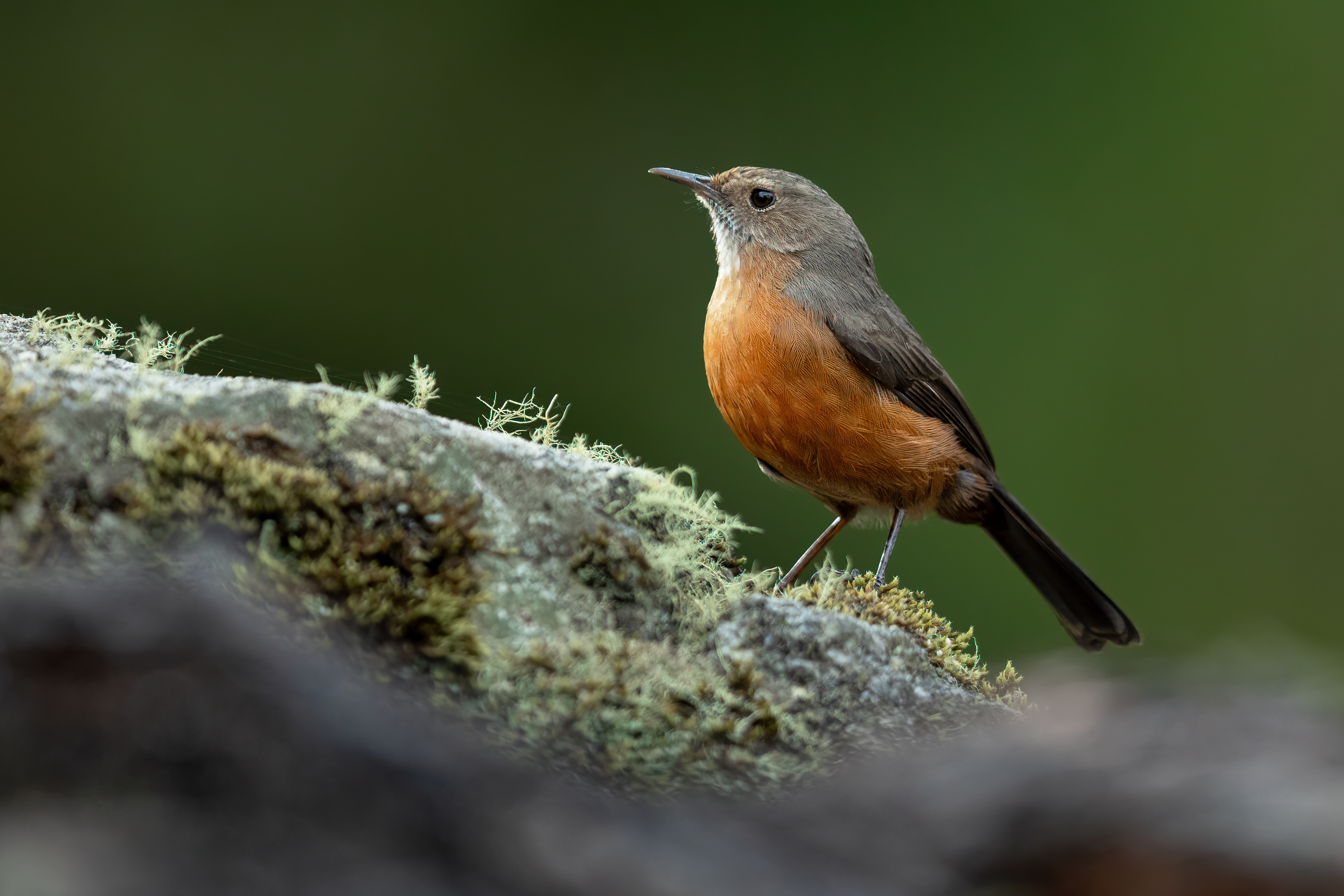

Conservation status
- Least Concern (IUCN 3.1)

Scientific classification
- Kingdom: Animalia
- Phylum: Chordata
- Class: Aves
- Order: Passeriformes
- Family: Acanthizidae
- Genus: Origma
- Species: O. solitaria

Binomial name
- Origma solitaria (Lewin, 1808)
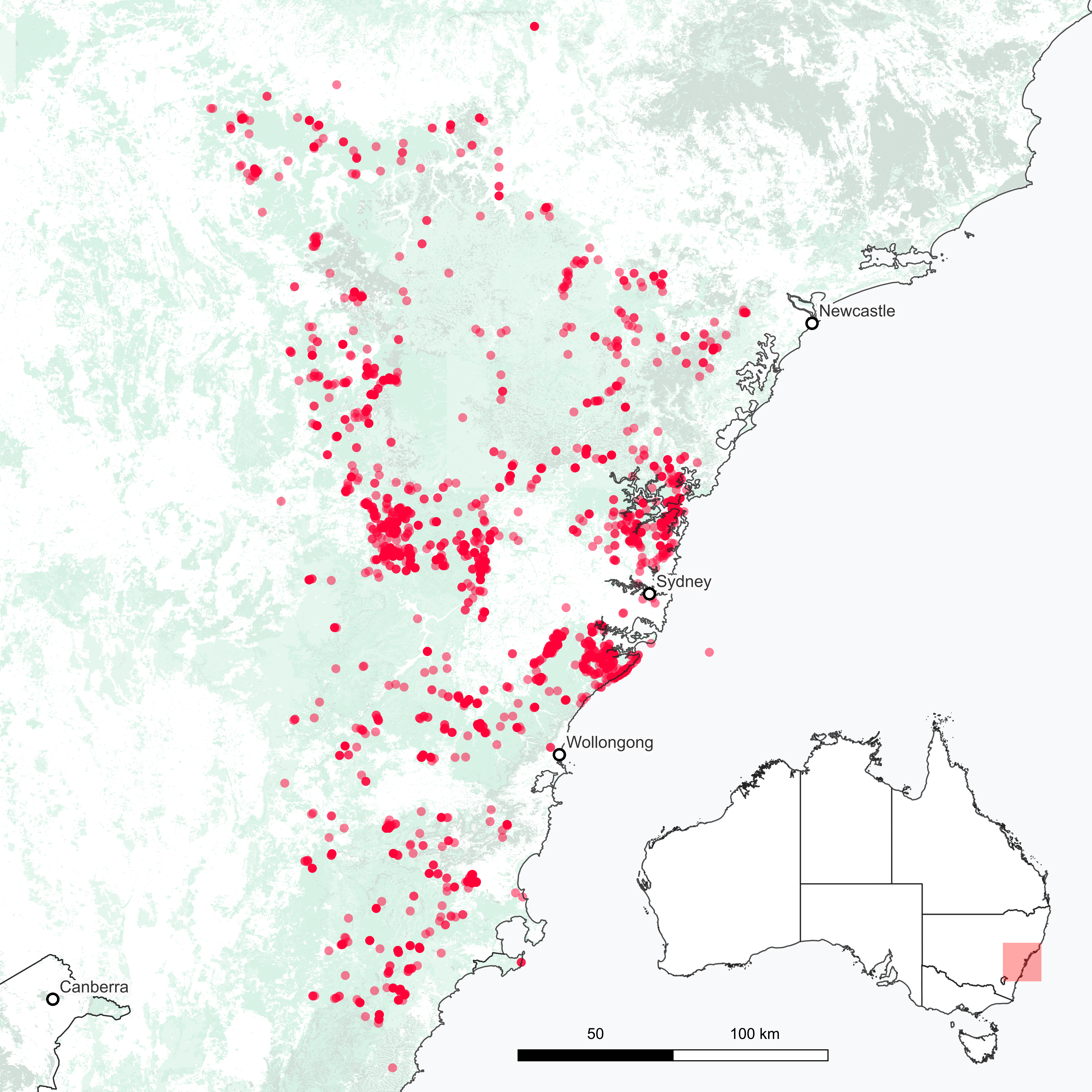
- Species distribution

Synonyms
- Sylvia solitaria, Lewin

= Rockwarbler =

Species of bird (Origma solitaria)

The rockwarbler (Origma solitaria), is a bird in the family Acanthizidae. It is the only bird species endemic to the mainland of the state of New South Wales in Australia.

== Taxonomy and systematics ==
The rockwarbler was described and illustrated in 1808 by the English artist and naturalist John Lewin under the binomial name Sylvia solitaria. For many years it was the only member of the genus Origma until genetic work showed that it was related to two species of mousewarblers from New Guinea. The rockwarbler diverged from the common ancestor of the other two species around 9 million years ago. Rockwarbler has been designated the official name by the International Ornithologists' Union (IOC). Common names also include cataract-bird, cave-bird, origma, rock-robin, and sandstone robin. A former common name, hanging dick, came about from its nest, which hangs suspended in a cave. It has no subspecies.

== Description ==
The rockwarbler is 14 cm (5.5 in) in length and weighs around 14 g (0.5 oz), with predominantly dark grey-brown plumage, darker wings and more red-brown underparts, cinnamon-tinged face and forehead, and whitish throat. Its tail is black. Adult males and females have similar plumage. Juveniles have duller and paler plumage than the adult, with a reddish tint to the throat, and a greyer chin. It can be distinguished from the pilotbird by its smaller size and head, white throat patch, and square tail.

Its main call is a repeated shrill chis-sick, given during the breeding season–though they may also give a tid-ed-dee. Its contact call is rasping and smooth. The alarm call is similar to the contact call, but a single note. Its scold call is a chatter similar to that of scrubwrens. They are accomplished mimics, and will replicate the calls of numerous other birds, including scrubwrens, white-eared honeyeaters, grey butcherbirds, eastern spinebills, rufous whistlers and more.

== Distribution and habitat ==
It is usually seen hopping erratically over rocks while flicking its tail. Its preferred habitat is woodland and gullies with exposed sandstone or limestone rocks, and often near water. Its distribution is central eastern New South Wales, within a 240 km (150 mi) radius of Sydney. It has been affected adversely by human-modified habitat, and has declined in these areas. Most of its range is protected in national parks, which has insulated the species from habitat loss. They generally do not migrate, except in very dry conditions.

== Behavior and ecology ==
Rockwarblers may live alone, in pairs, or in family groups with as many as five members. They do not fly very far, though they are quite fast. Flights tend to be low to the ground. When not flying, they will flick their tail side-to-side.

=== Breeding and nesting ===
Mated pairs maintain a territory, nesting in a sandstone cave. The nest is a hanging structure made of grasses, roots, bark and moss, with spider web used as an adhesive. It has a dome-shaped entrance. Breeding season is from August to January. The female lays a clutch of three eggs, which take around 23 days to hatch. Up to two clutches may be laid in a season.

=== Diet ===
Rockwarblers are generally insectivores, but will supplement the diet with seeds. Insects are taken mostly on the ground, or in lower branches of vegetation. They may also hover in short bursts to catch prey. They are inquisitive and will investigate nooks and crannies in rocks, as well as under leaf litter. They are nimble, being able to move vertically up rock faces to probe rock features. Preferred insects are ants, wasps, and beetles, as well as butterfly and moth larvae. Panic grass and wheat are both acceptable grains. They will also take food left by humans, namely bread crumbs and butter.
