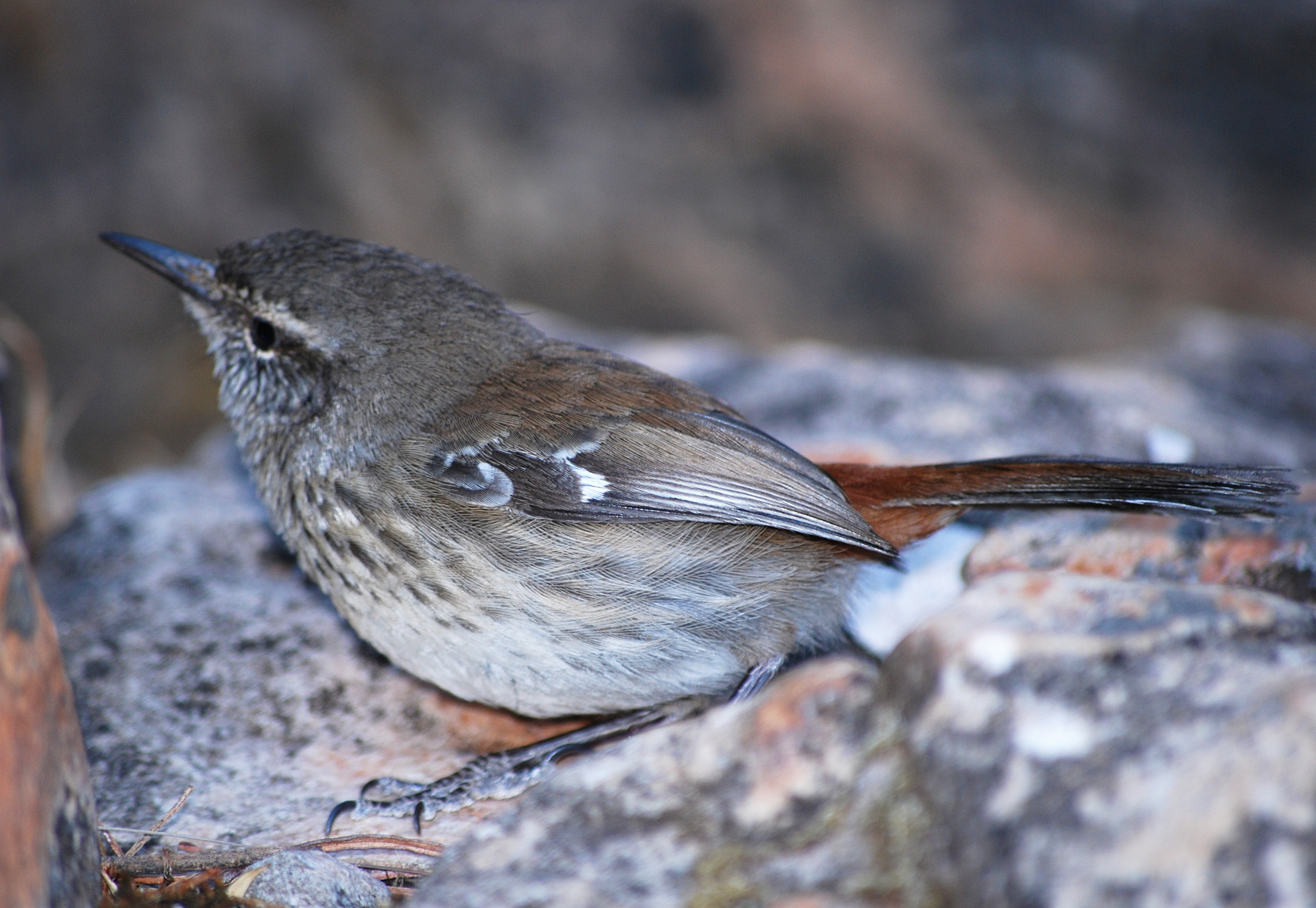
- Shy heathwren (Hylacola cauta)

Scientific classification
- Kingdom: Animalia
- Phylum: Chordata
- Class: Aves
- Order: Passeriformes
- Family: Acanthizidae
- Genus: Hylacola; Gould, 1843

= Hylacola =

Genus of birds

Hylacola is a genus of bird in the family Acanthizidae. These birds are commonly known as heathwrens.

== Species ==
It contains the following species, both of which are endemic to Australia:

| Image | Common Name | Scientific name | Distribution |
|---|---|---|---|
| | shy heathwren | Hylacola cauta | Australia |
| | chestnut-rumped heathwren | Hylacola pyrrhopygia | Australia |
