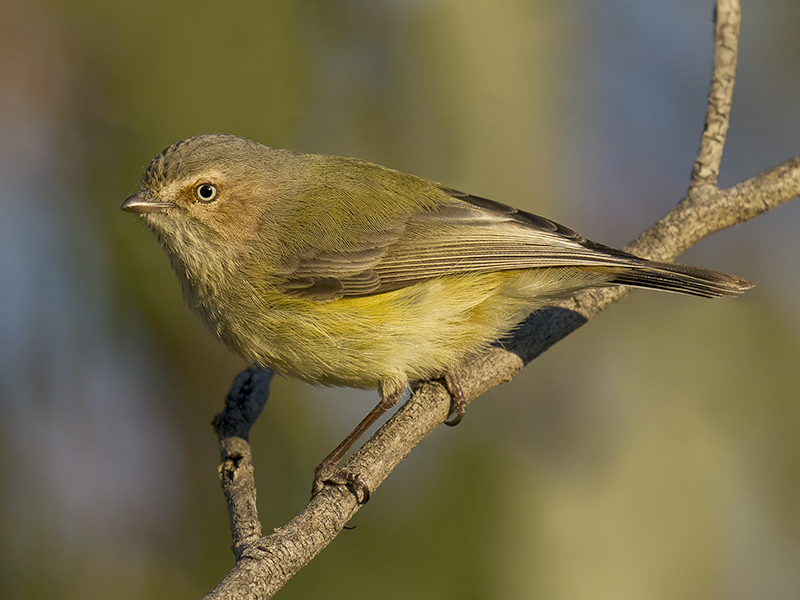
- Nominate subspecies, Victoria

Conservation status
- Least Concern (IUCN 3.1)

Scientific classification
- Kingdom: Animalia
- Phylum: Chordata
- Class: Aves
- Order: Passeriformes
- Family: Acanthizidae
- Genus: Smicrornis; Gould, 1843
- Species: S. brevirostris

Binomial name
- Smicrornis brevirostris (Gould, 1838)
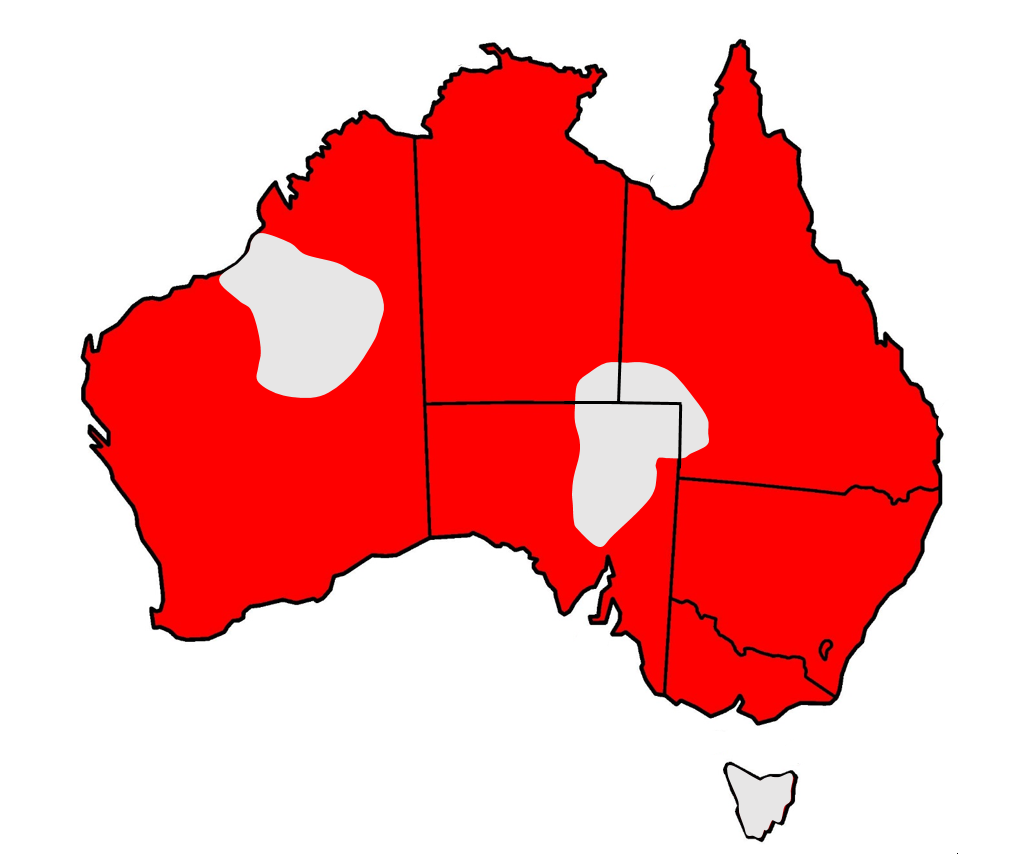
- Approximate range in Australia Year-round range

= Weebill =

Species of bird

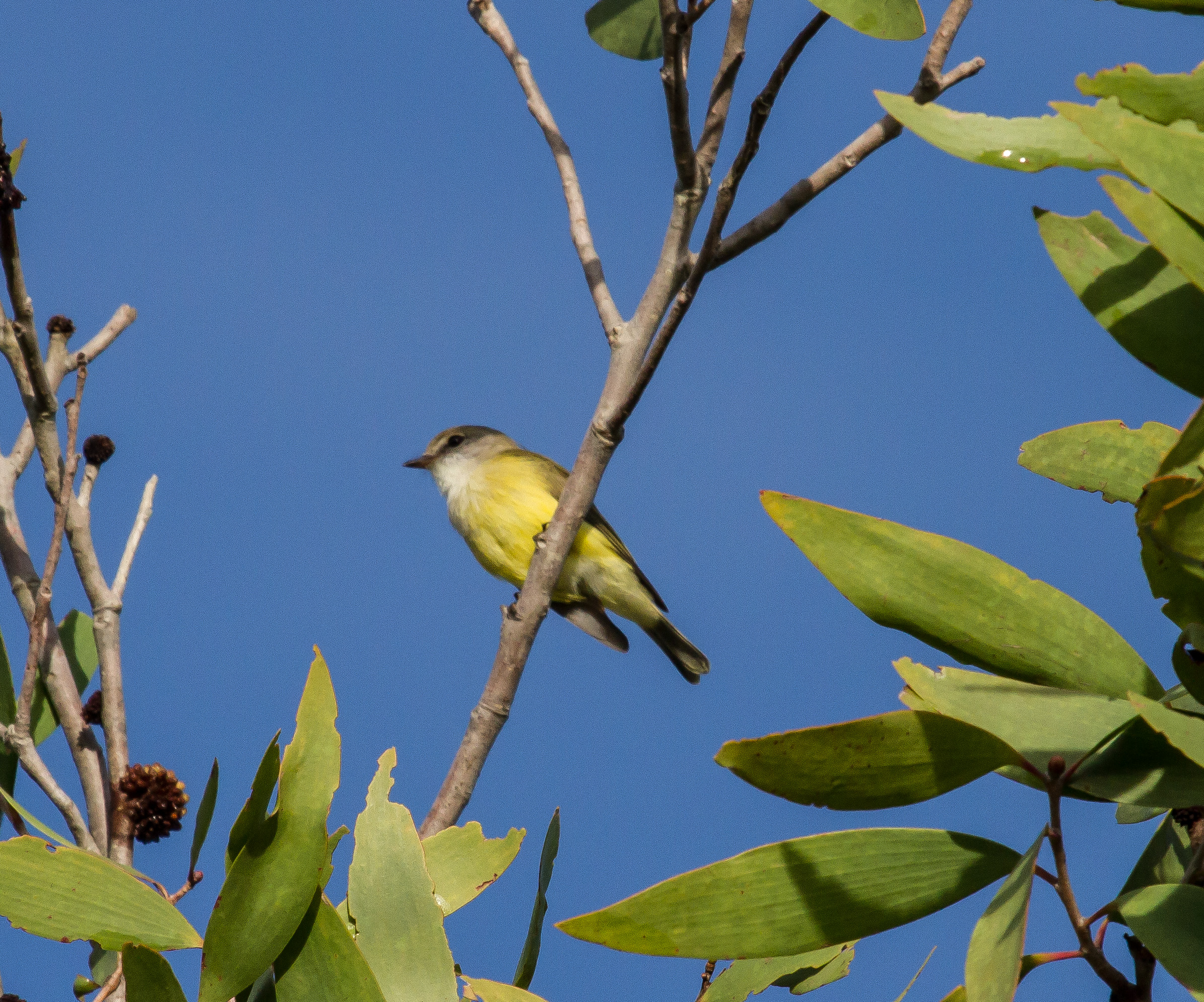
Subspecies flavescens, Northern Territory

The weebill (Smicrornis brevirostris) is a species of bird in the family Acanthizidae. It is an insectivorous passerine that is found throughout mainland Australia. At 8 to 9 cm (3.1 to 3.5 in) long, it is Australia's smallest bird. It was originally described by John Gould in 1838, and four subspecies are recognised. The weebill's plumage is nondescript, with olive-grey upperparts and paler, more yellowish underparts. It grades from more brownish plumage in the southern regions of Australia to more yellow in tropical areas.

== Taxonomy ==
The weebill was described by John Gould in 1838 as Psilopus brevirostris. The species epithet is derived from the Latin words brevis 'short' and rostrum 'beak'.

In 1843, Gould erected the genus Smicrornis for his new species Smicrornis flavescens, collected from Port Essington, noting it as distinct from Gerygone (which had replaced Psilopus as a name). The generic name Smicrornis derives from the Greek smicros 'small' and ornis 'bird'. It is the only member of genus Smicrornis; gene flow is strong and local variation follows Bergmann's and Gloger's rules.

Gould initially called it the short-billed smicrornis, but it did not gain acceptance. Other names include tree-tit, short billed tree-tit, scrub-tit, or short-billed scrub-tit. Weebill was adopted as the name in the 1926 RAOU checklist.

=== Subspecies ===
Four subspecies are currently recognised in addition to the nominate subspecies:

- S. b. flavescens (Gould, 1843) – ranging across Northern Australia from the Kimberley to northern and western Queensland (including Cape York Peninsula) and southward to the northern Great Sandy and Tanami Deserts, Central Australian ranges, northern Simpson Desert and central Thomson drainage.
- S. b. ochrogaster (Schodde & Mason, 1999) – western and central Western Australia (south from the Pilbara).
- S. b. occidentalis (Bonaparte, 1850) – southwest Western Australia (south from lower Murchison Range and Kalgoorlie region), eastward around southern rim of Nullarbor Plain to South Australia (southward from central Flinders Ranges, lower Lake Frome basin and Murray Mallee).
- S. b. brevirostris (Gould, 1838) – Eastern Australia from central and eastern Queensland (Burdekin River drainage), southward to Victoria and southeast South Australia.

== Description ==
The weebill is Australia's smallest bird at approximately 8 to 9 cm (3.1 to 3.5 in) long and weighing an average of 6 grams (adult bird). Wingspan is approximately 15 cm (5.9 in).

Weebills have inconspicuously coloured plumage ranging from yellowish-grey (front) to olive-brownish-grey (back). The two main feather pigments involved in this variation are yellow (phaeomelanin) and olive-brown (eumelanin). There is geographical variation in plumage across the four subspecies.

Adults have pale yellow eyes and a faint cream coloured supercilium. The throat feathers are grey, often with striation, and the flight feathers on the wings are pale brown. The tail feathers are brown with a black bar and white spot on the tip of all the rectrices, except the central pairs, which are completely dark. Both sexes are monomorphic in plumage colouration.

The bill is short and pale grey. The stubby bill of the weebill assists in distinguishing it from thornbills. The legs and feet of the weebill are grey, and like all passerines, their toe arrangement is anisodactyl for perching.

Juveniles have a similar plumage to adults, but can be identified by a brighter, yellow bill and greyer eye.

Four subspecies of weebill are currently recognised and exhibit slight variation in feather pigmentation, dependent on distribution. In the south and east of Australia, subspecies occidentalis and brevirostris are light brown; in the southwest, the subspecies occidentalis exhibits greyer plumage; while subspecies flavescens in northern and inland Australia is paler and more yellow. Additionally, the Northern Australian weebills are smaller than those in the south.

The voice of the weebill is a loud, clear, musical pee-pee p'wee, wee bit or wee willy weetee, often heard from a considerable distance.

== Distribution and habitat ==
The weebill is found in woodlands and forests across most of mainland Australia, excluding Tasmania. All four subspecies of weebills are sedentary in their range, and numbers are regular throughout the year.

They are most commonly found in the canopies of dry, open eucalyptus forests, woodlands and mallee, occasionally coming down to the midstory to feed primarily on small insects and their larvae. They display a preference for foraging in the canopy foliage of healthy eucalyptus trees, where they are more likely to retrieve insects. The weebill is widespread in all climates, although localised to watercourses in arid zones. They are somewhat gregarious with other small insectivorous passerines, such as thornbills, silvereyes, and pardalotes.

== Ecology ==
=== Diet ===
The diet consists mostly of insects, larvae, occasionally seeds and beetles . Arthropod prey items include spiders (Araneae), beetles (Coleoptera, including Curculionids), and flies (Diptera). Weebills forage busily in pairs, or small parties of up to 8, feeding mainly in trees, often hovering, they are active and noisy and cling to twigs while gleaning insects from the outer foliage of the canopy and midstory.

Weebills assist in maintaining the health of trees, as they glean scale insects and eat a range of other insects, including psyllids and their protective covers (lerps).

=== Reproduction ===
The dome-shaped pendant nests of weebills are made from fine, pliable materials, such as grasses and plant fibres suspended from a branch and concealed in dense foliage of the tree canopy. Weebills are known to utilize cobwebs, insect cocoons and animal hair to bind, strengthen, and further conceal the nest.

The breeding season of weebills depends on latitude and climatic conditions. They can breed at almost any time of the year, but most commonly from July to May. Courtship displays have been observed in weebills, where males ruffle their cheek and head feathers with outstretched wings to the female. It is thought that male and female weebills display to each other at the nest-site with tail-fanning, slight bowing and wing quivering.

The female usually lays two to four brown-speckled cream-coloured eggs, which are tapered-oval in shape. Only the female incubates the eggs, which hatch after 10–12 days, and then both parents care for the chicks.

Weebill eggs in the nest are occasionally vulnerable to small brood parasites, such as the Horsfield's bronze-cuckoo, where the female cuckoo removes the weebill eggs and lays one or two eggs in the host nest for the weebill to raise.

== Threats and conservation ==
Widespread and common in its habitat throughout its range on mainland Australia, the weebill is evaluated as Least Concern on the IUCN Red List of Threatened Species. However, like many woodland birds throughout Australia, local declines have been noted, these being consequent upon habitat loss and fragmentation caused by deforestation of Eucalyptus woodlands and other anthropogenic changes to the characteristics of the land.

Human-caused disturbances include introduced flora and fauna species, and altered fire regimes that can result in changes to ecosystem-level processes, modify habitat structure and consequently affect fauna assemblages.
