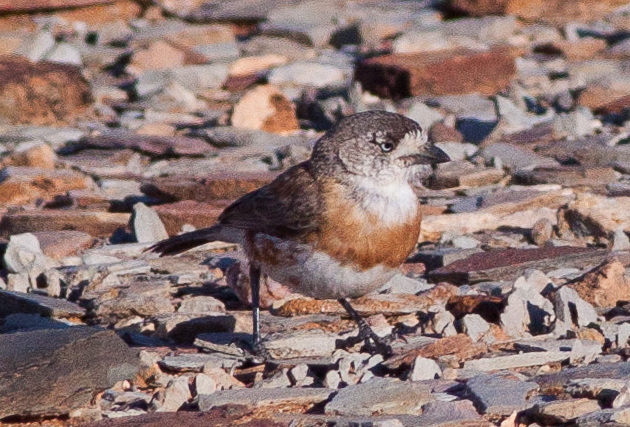
- near Strzelecki Track, South Australia, Australia

Conservation status
- Near Threatened (IUCN 3.1)

Scientific classification
- Kingdom: Animalia
- Phylum: Chordata
- Class: Aves
- Order: Passeriformes
- Family: Acanthizidae
- Genus: Aphelocephala
- Species: A. pectoralis

Binomial name
- Aphelocephala pectoralis (Gould, 1871)

= Chestnut-breasted whiteface =

Chestnut-breasted Whiteface

Species of bird

The chestnut-breasted whiteface (Aphelocephala pectoralis) is a small passerine bird endemic to inland South Australia, with some unconfirmed sightings in the Northern Territory.

The species is most likely found on the Country of the Antakirinja Matu-Yankunytjatjara, Arabana and Kokatha-Barngarla peoples, although no Indigenous name has been recorded for it and Country boundaries are approximate.

== Taxonomy ==
The holotype species was both described and named by John Gould in 1871 from a specimen forwarded to him by Frederick_George_Waterhouse the curator of the South Australian Museum at the time. Originally it was thought that the specimen was obtained by FW Andrews who was a well known field collector and had previously sent Gould new species. However, records of Andrews' collections make no reference to this species; evidence would suggest it was actually collected by Frank Gibson, a gentleman shepherd, who was an enthusiastic collector of field species for the South Australian Museum. In a book on South Australian birds, published by Waterhouse in 1876, the bird is referred to as 'Gibson's Xerophila, Xerophila pectoralis (Chestnut-breasted whiteface)' and the location was referred to as 'the Far North' (of South Australia).

For many decades after Gould's initial naming, there was some hesitation to accept it as a new species, as some believed Gould had instead identified an immature Banded_whiteface. This matter was settled in 1921 when such a juvenile was captured and used to dispel the idea and Gould was exonerated.

It took 43 years after its initial discovery for a second scientific observation, after which there were many to confirm its existence and to gain more information.

Typical for Linnaean binomial nomenclature (Linnaean_taxonomy), it was named for its appearance, in this case the colour of its chestnut breast. The Latin translates to 'plain-headed, breast-banded' from the Latin Aphelocephala meaning 'smooth or plain headed' (referring to the relatively unmarked, simple head pattern of the whitefaces in this genus) and pectoralis meaning 'of the breast'.

== Description ==
The chestnut-breasted whiteface is around 9–12 cm in length, with an unknown wingspan. An adult bird averages 9–10 g in weight.

It is comparable in appearance to the Banded Whiteface but the distinctive breast band of a rufous-brown/chestnut colour allows for definitive identification; this colour appears in all plumages.

True to its name, the lores, chin, throat, malar area, lower forehead, throat and chin are all a whitish colour, although worn or dirty birds may have grey or black smudges or stripes in these regions. The crown of the head, nape and hind neck are a mottled light grey or brown colour. The distinctive band of rufous or chestnut crosses over the complete breast and loops around to the mantle and lesser coverts. The belly is white but the flanks take on barred dark rufous colouring.

The undertail coverts are white; the undertail is predominantly black but turns white at the broad, flat tip. The uppertail is predominantly black, but blends to light brown at the terminus.

The flight feathers vary from dark brown to a light brown or buff colour with lighter edge scalloping, creating a scaly appearance.

Eye colour tends to be a buff white but may have a blue tinge in some individuals.

The chestnut-breasted whiteface has a short, finch-like bill, which is black in colour. Its legs are also black.

The species is considered sexually monomorphic, with very little variation between male and female.

Juveniles are very similar to adults but have a breast band that is less observable, as well as a paler version of the rest of the adult colouring.

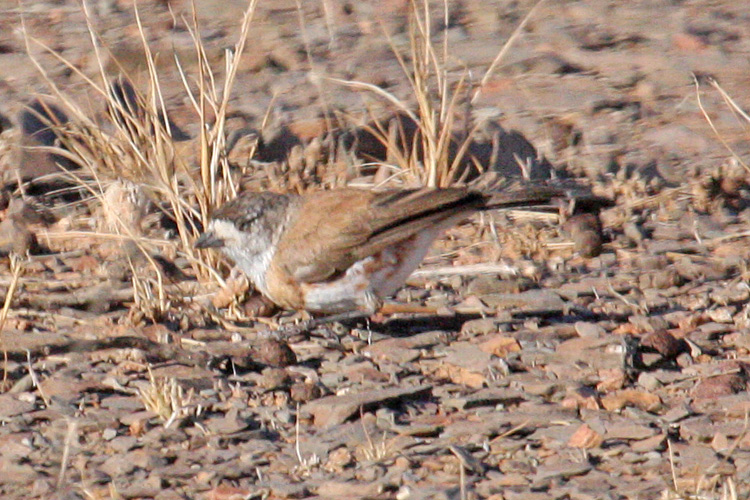
Chestnut-breasted Whiteface (Aphelocephala pectoralis) from side

== Distribution and habitat ==
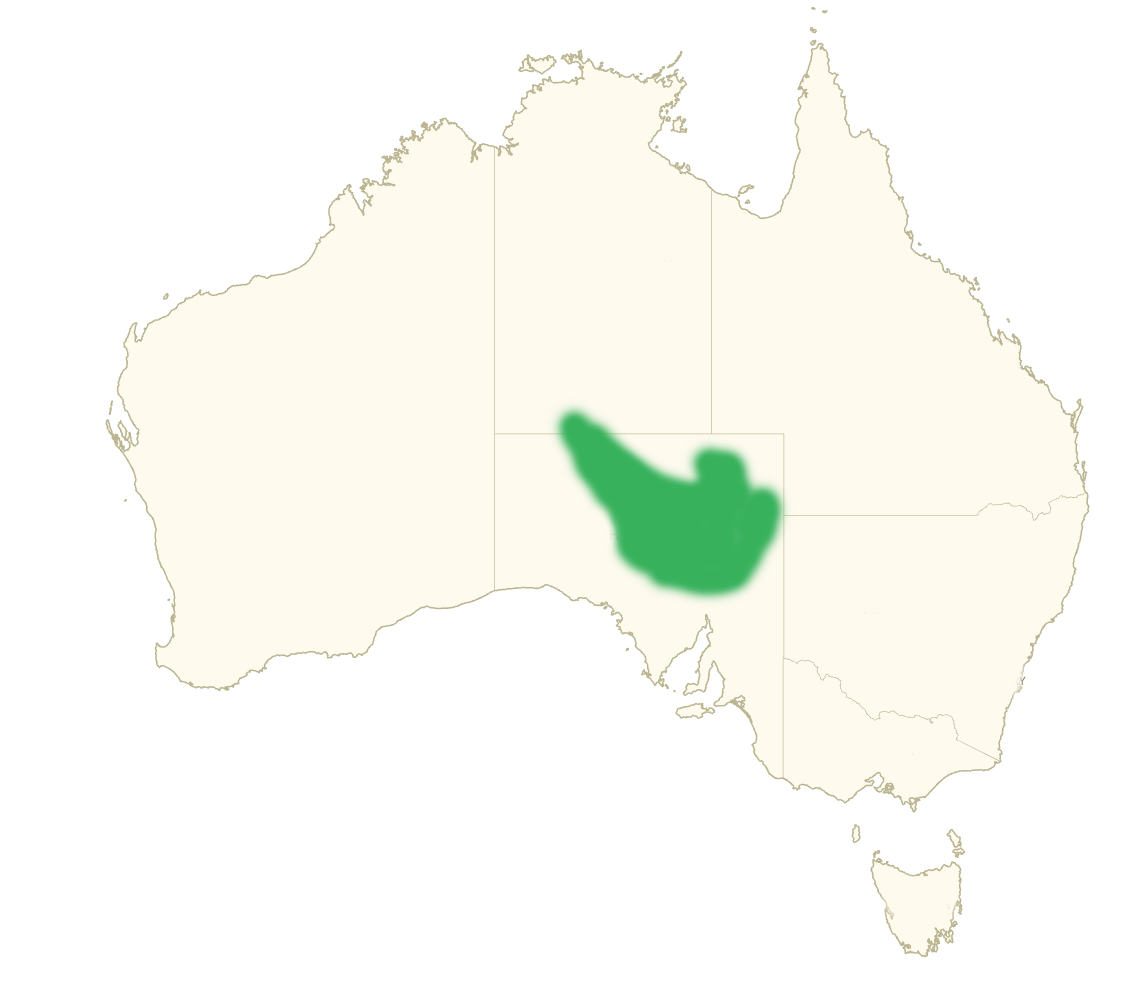
Distribution map of the Chestnut-breasted Whiteface (Aphelocephala pectoralis) in Australia

Chestnut-breasted whiteface sightings are rare because they are mostly found in the arid zone of South Australia, but do extend into semi-arid areas. This location is sparsely populated by humans and has few accessible roads. The terrain is mostly gibber tablelands, stony hills and undulating rises with sparse vegetation. Gibber plains have very little vegetation, so sightings there are unlikely as the species requires undergrowth for safety and foraging. Instead, they prefer chenopod shrublands, which are characterised by low, hardy plants such as Atriplex (saltbush), bluebush Maireana (especially Maireana astrotricha), Sclerolaena, Rhagodia and Eremophila. These plants are drought and salt resistant.

== Behaviour ==
These birds are generally found in pairs or small flocks and have been observed in mixed foraging flocks with other whitefaces or Cinnamon_quail-thrush. They have been observed to be the last species to move on after the leaders of a mixed foraging group flew to a new area, and were comparatively quiet during foraging whilst other species called noisily. They perch in low shrubs and are described as timid and often difficult to approach. If disturbed they tend to fly off in a low, undulating manner either a short distance to continue foraging or, if suitably alarmed, will fly far enough away to make relocation challenging.

The chestnut-breasted whiteface is limited in its vocalisation, and few recordings exist. It has been described as producing a loud, medium-pitched trill of repeated syllables as well as a twittering song.

== Diet ==
The diet of the chestnut-breasted whiteface consists of insects and seeds. Arthropods eaten include beetles, butterfly and moth larvae, wasps, grasshoppers and shield bugs. Seeds eaten include those of arid grasses (Panicum, Setaria), heath-like shrubs (Epacris), flowering shrubs and herbs (Sida) and succulent plants (Portulaca).

They feed by foraging on the ground or catching insects on the wing, known as hawking.

== Nesting ==
The species favours Low Bluebush (Maireana astrotricha) for nesting. The lining of the nests usually consists of sheep wool and fine feathers. The dimensions of the first nest documented were 12 cm long and 10 cm thick. In subsequent observations they have been described as bulky dome shapes with a side entrance leading to two chambers, an inner and outer.

The birds generally lay 2–3 eggs of a pale pink ground colour that are less than 2 cm long.

Nestlings are altricial and remain in the nest to be fed by the parents. They are believed to hatch mostly naked.

== Threats ==
Overgrazing by livestock and rabbits poses a threat to this species due to habitat loss and degradation. Heavy opal mining is also known to destroy habitat.

== Conservation status ==
The chestnut-breasted whiteface is currently listed as a Near-threatened_species, with a rare status.

The justification for this listing is that the species was never common and appears to have declined in areas where it was previously recorded, indicating a possible ongoing decline. It is likely that there is more than one subpopulation and numbers most likely exceed 1000 mature birds.
