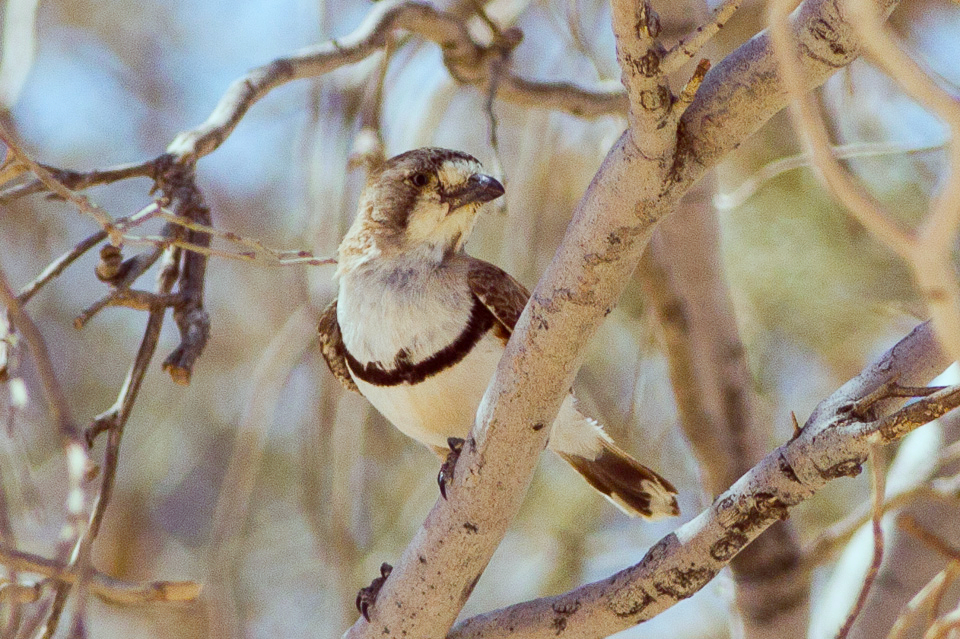
- Near Strzelecki Track, South Australia

Conservation status
- Least Concern (IUCN 3.1)

Scientific classification
- Kingdom: Animalia
- Phylum: Chordata
- Class: Aves
- Order: Passeriformes
- Family: Acanthizidae
- Genus: Aphelocephala
- Species: A. nigricincta

Binomial name
- Aphelocephala nigricincta (North, 1895)

Synonyms
- Xerophila nigricincta North

= Banded whiteface =

Species of bird

The banded whiteface (Aphelocephala nigricincta) is a species of bird in the family Acanthizidae. It is endemic to dryer regions of Australia.

The ornithologist Alfred John North described the banded whiteface as Xerophila nigricincta in 1895, from specimens collected at Missionary Plains, Northern Territory. Harry Church Oberholser pointed out that this genus name was invalid as it had been given to a genus of mollusc, hence it gained its current name Aphelocephala nigricincta in 1899.

== Description ==
The adult banded whiteface is around 10 cm (4 in) long. The upper parts of the body and head are greyish brown. The face has a white mask bordered by a darker band which runs vertically across the region of the eyes. The upper breast is pale blue-grey and the underparts white, separated by a prominent black band across the breast. There are red-brown patches on the flanks. The bill and legs are black and the eyes are white. The plumage of male and female are alike and juveniles are duller.

== Behaviour ==
Like the other birds in its genus, the banded whiteface hops over open ground in pairs or small groups foraging for seeds and insects.

Nesting takes place in winter from July to September or after a period of rain. Located on the ground near shrubs, the round hollow nest is constructed of twigs and grass and has a long tubular entrance. Both the nest and the tunnel are lined with flowers and feathers. The clutch consists of three or four matte white eggs with brown blotches mostly at the larger end. Tapered oval in shape, they are around 17 mm long by 13 mm wide.

The banded whiteface has been reported to enter torpor at night in winter months, reawakening as it warms in the morning.

== Distribution and habitat ==
A nomadic or sedentary species moving according to seasonal conditions, the banded whiteface is found in a very large range from southwestern Queensland across dryer parts of central and southern Australia into mid-Western Australia. It inhabits mulga woodland, gibber plains and sandhills, and frequents saltbush and spinifex.
