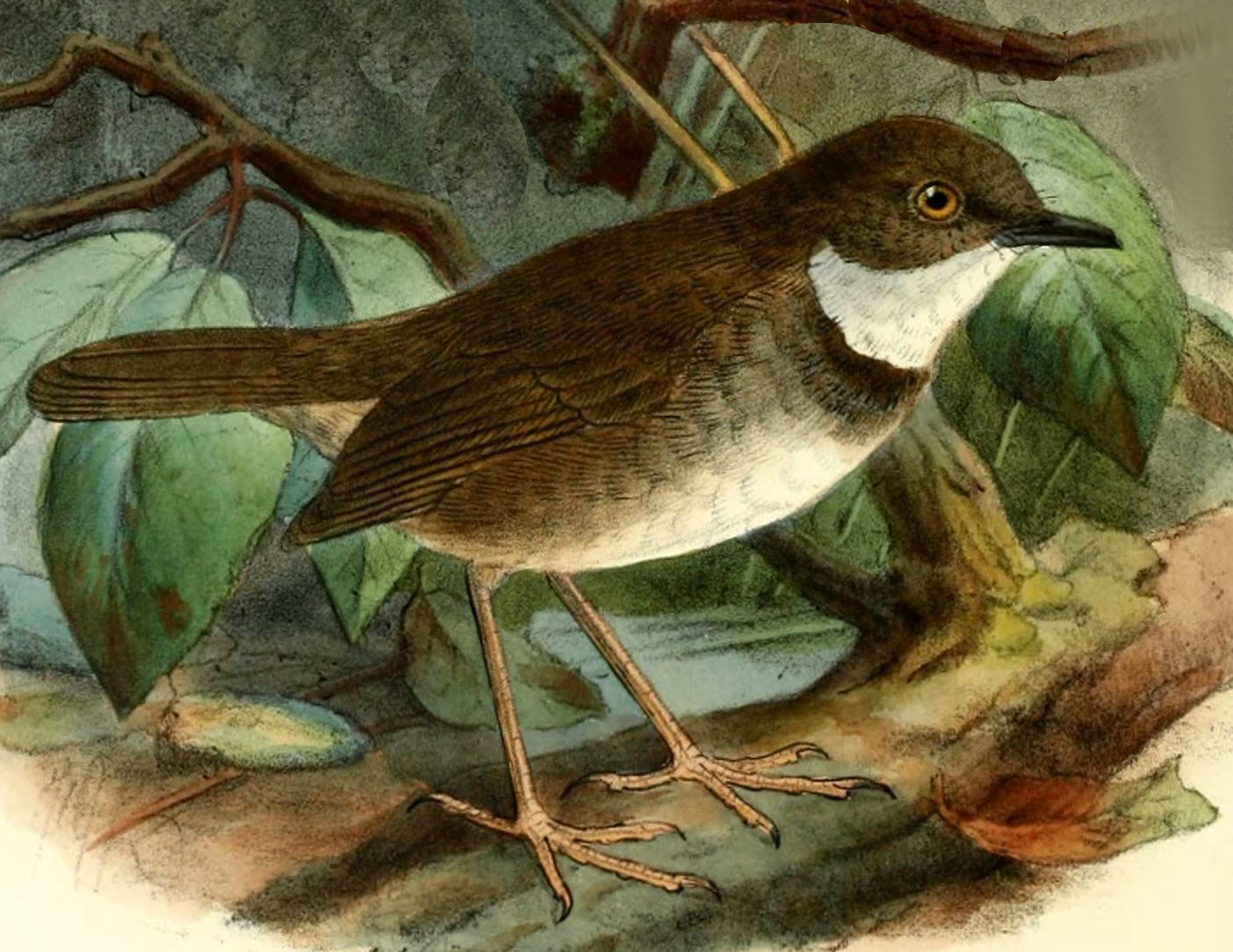
- Mountain mouse-warbler, Crateroscelis robusta

Scientific classification
- Kingdom: Animalia
- Phylum: Chordata
- Class: Aves
- Order: Passeriformes
- Family: Acanthizidae
- Genus: Crateroscelis; Sharpe, 1883

= Crateroscelis =

Genus of birds

Crateroscelis is a songbird genus of the Australasian "warbler" family (Acanthizidae). It was formerly placed in the Pardalotidae, which are now considered monotypic to genus. The common name of these birds is mouse-warblers.

It contains the following species:

Image	Scientific name	Common name
	Crateroscelis murina	Rusty mouse-warbler
	Crateroscelis nigrorufa	Bicolored mouse-warbler
	Crateroscelis robusta	Mountain mouse-warbler
