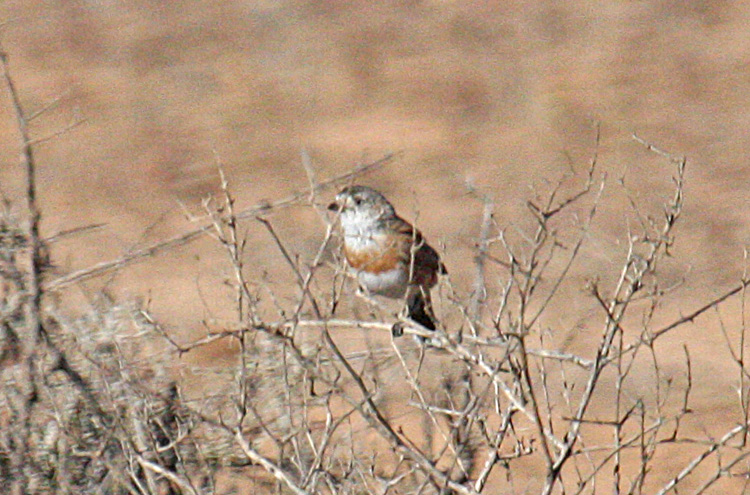
- Chestnut-breasted whiteface (Aphelocephala pectoralis)

Scientific classification
- Kingdom: Animalia
- Phylum: Chordata
- Class: Aves
- Order: Passeriformes
- Family: Acanthizidae
- Genus: Aphelocephala; Oberholser, 1899

Type species
- Xerophila leucopsis Gould, 1841

Species
- 3, see text

= Aphelocephala =

Genus of birds

Aphelocephala is a genus of bird in the thornbill family Acanthizidae. The three species are collectively known as whitefaces. They are endemic to Australia, generally occurring in the arid centre of the continent. They are a striking looking bird, particularly compared to their duller looking relatives, having dark upperparts and white breasts and faces (as suggested by the name). Two species, the chestnut-breasted and banded whitefaces, break up the white undersides with a darker band (or double band). The three species have stubby bills and unlike the rest of the Acanthizidae they consume large numbers of seeds in their diet.

The genus had been originally described as Xerophila by John Gould, however Harry Church Oberholser pointed out that this genus name had been given to a genus of mollusc. Hence he proposed the name Aphelocephala from the Ancient Greek aphelos "simple" and kephale (Latin: caput) "head".

It contains the following three species:

Image	Common name	Scientific name	Distribution
	Southern whiteface	Aphelocephala leucopsis	most of the southern half of Australia, excluding Tasmania
	Chestnut-breasted whiteface	Aphelocephala pectoralis	inland South Australia, unconfirmed sightings in Northern Territory
	Banded whiteface	Aphelocephala nigricincta	dryer regions of Australia
