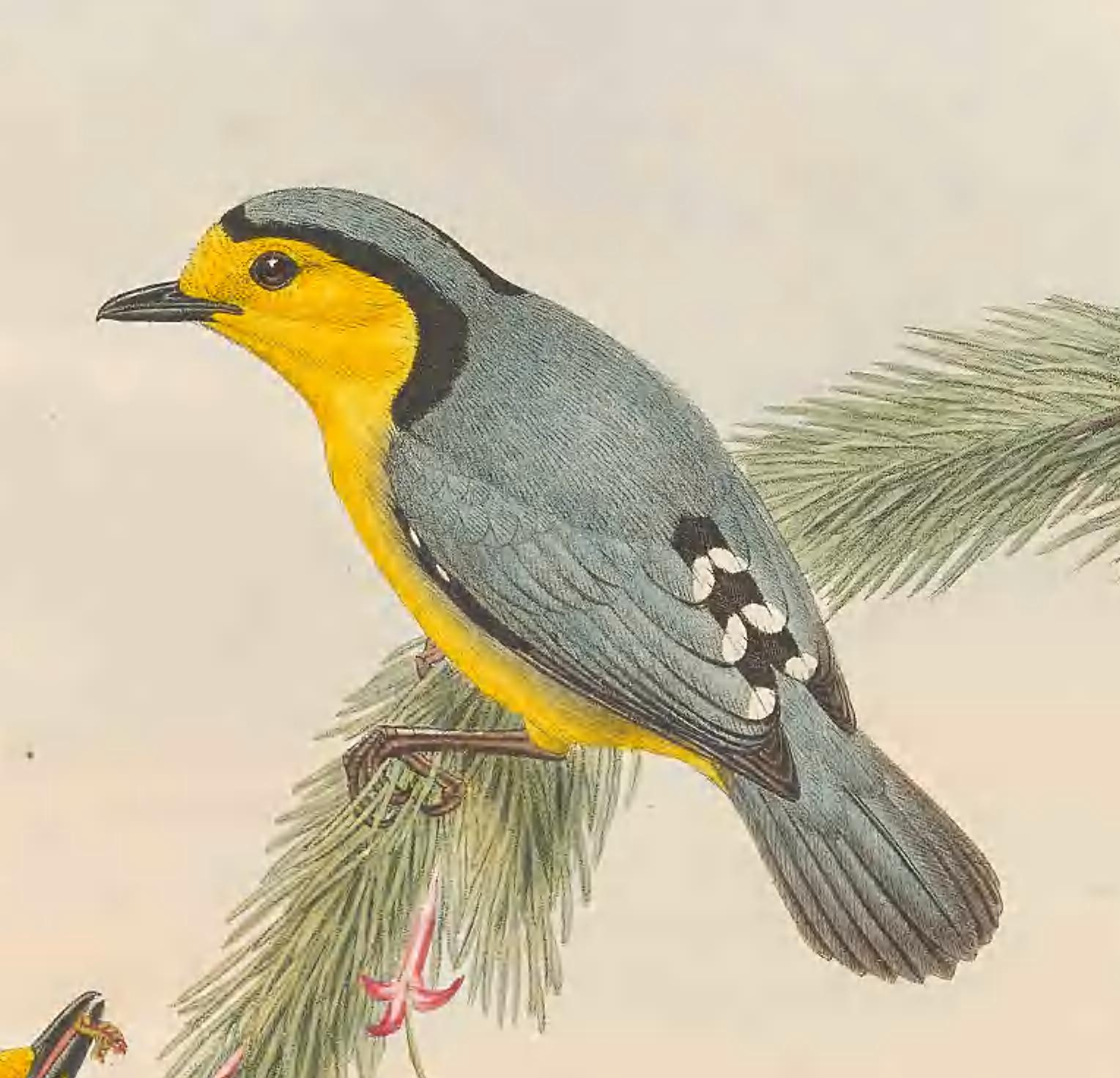
- Illustration by John Gould and W. Hart
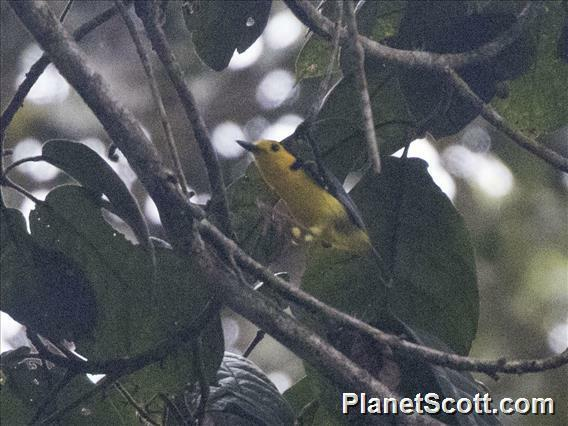

Conservation status
- Least Concern (IUCN 3.1)

Scientific classification
- Kingdom: Animalia
- Phylum: Chordata
- Class: Aves
- Order: Passeriformes
- Family: Acanthizidae
- Genus: Pachycare; Gould, 1876
- Species: P. flavogriseum

Binomial name
- Pachycare flavogriseum (A.B. Meyer, 1874)

Subspecies
- P. f. lecroyae - Beehler & Prawiradilaga, 2010; P. f. flavogriseum - (Meyer, AB, 1874); P. f. subaurantium - Rothschild & Hartert, 1911; P. f. subpallidum - Hartert, 1930

= Goldenface =

Species of bird

The goldenface (Pachycare flavogriseum) is a species of passerine bird endemic to New Guinea. It is the only species (monotypic) within the genus Pachycare.

== Taxonomy and systematics ==
The placement of this species and genus within the passerines is uncertain. It has been suggested that it belongs with the whistlers, in the family Pachycephalidae, based on its bright yellow plumage and voice, and the species is sometimes known as the dwarf whistler. Others have suggested placing it with the Australasian robins in the family Petroicidae, but the nest architecture is unlike that of the robin family; in fact, its nests more closely resemble those of the thornbills in the family Acanthizidae, another family to which it has sometimes been aligned. This relationship was supported by a 2009 molecular study, which placed the species in that family. There are four subspecies: Pachycare flavogriseum flavogriseum, P. f. subaurantium, P. f. subpallidum and P. f. lecroyae.

== Range and distribution ==
The species is endemic to the island of New Guinea, where it occurs in both Papua and Papua New Guinea. The preferred habitat of the goldenface is hill and montane forest, between 400 and 1800 m; it is usually commoner in dense forest between 1600 and 1800 m.

== Description ==
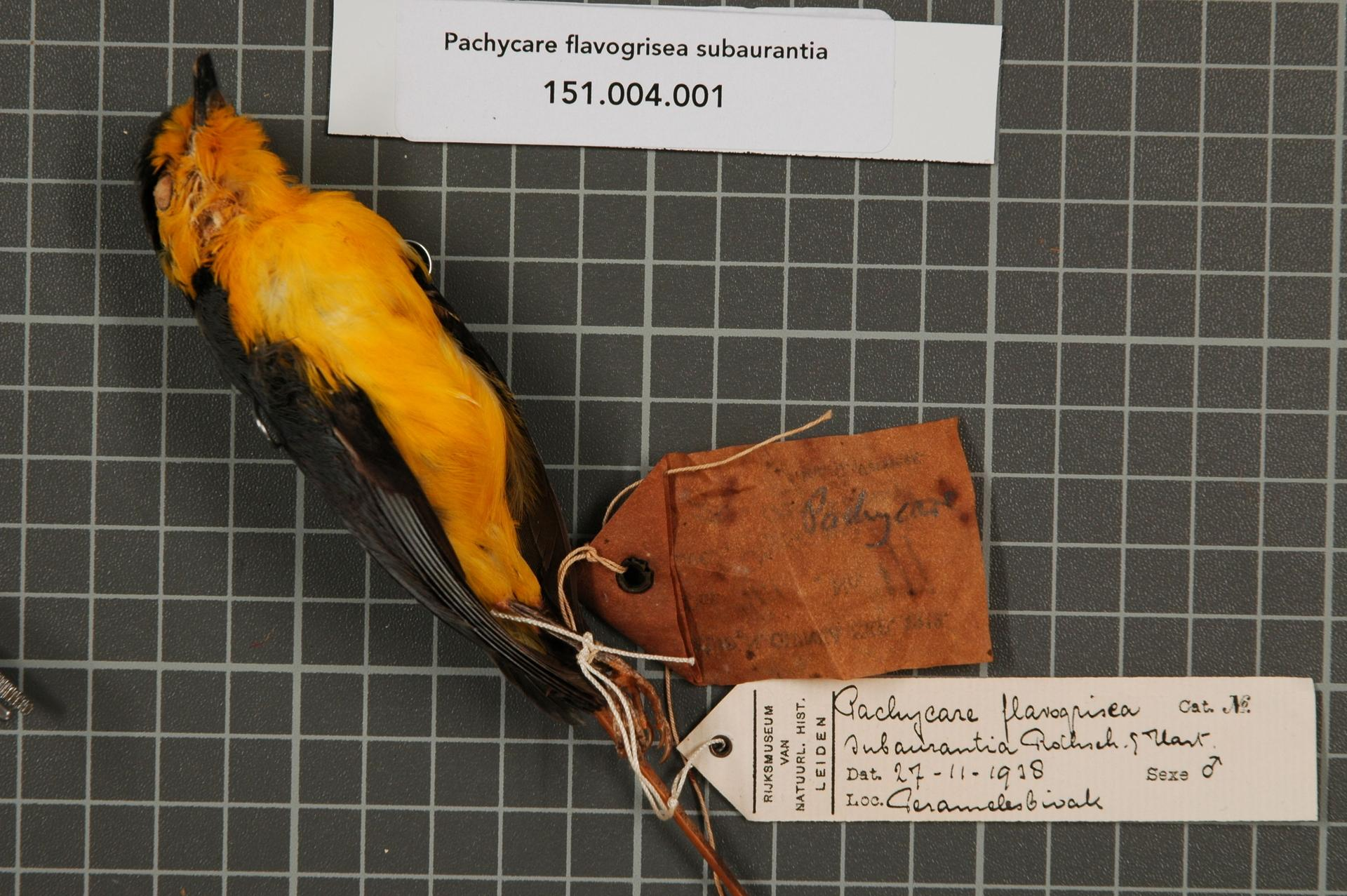
Bird skin specimen at Naturalis Biodiversity Center

The goldenface is a small whistler, around 13 cm in length and weighing 14–19 g. The plumage of the species is striking; the nominate subspecies (Pachycare flavogriseum flavogriseum) has a slate-grey back, tail, wing, cap and back of the neck and bright yellow face, throat, breast and belly. From the crown to the shoulder, the face is bordered with a black line and the tertial feathers of the wing are tipped with black and white. The eye and bill are black and the legs are pink. There is a small amount of sexual dimorphism, with the female differing from the male in having a dusky patch on the face. Immature birds of either sexes resemble the female. The three other subspecies resemble the nominate subspecies with minor differences. The subspecies P. f. subaurantium has darker upperparts and a slight orange tint, and P. f. subpallidum has much paler upperparts and the most yellow undersides. The identification of goldenface study skins held in museum collections is complicated by the tendency of the plumage colours used to identify the subspecies fading after death.

== Behaviour ==
Insects and spiders form the majority of the diet of this species. These prey items are gleaned from the outer foliage of trees, usually in the midstory, sometimes entering the upper stories of the forest. Goldenfaces will sometimes join mixed-species feeding flocks when foraging.

Little is known about the breeding biology of the goldenface. It may be slightly seasonal; birds in breeding condition have been found in August and October, and eggs and nestlings have been found from June to November. The nest, which is built by both parents, is globular in shape and has a downward pointing side entrance.
