= Alfred John North =

Australian ornithologist

- Born: 11 June 1855; Melbourne
- Died: 6 May 1917 (aged 61); Sydney
- Education: Melbourne Grammar School
- Known for: List of the Insectivorous Birds of New South Wales (1897)
- Scientific career
- Fields: Ornithology
- Institutions: Australian Museum, Sydney
- Author abbrev. (zoology): North

Alfred John North (11 June 1855 – 6 May 1917) was an Australian ornithologist.

North was born in Melbourne and was educated at Melbourne Grammar School. He was appointed to the Australian Museum, Sydney in 1886 and was given a permanent position there five years later. He wrote a List of the Insectivorous Birds of New South Wales (1897) and a Descriptive Catalogue of the Nests and Eggs of Birds Found Breeding in Australia and Tasmania (1889) with George Barnard as co-author. He described a number of birds for the first time, many in the Victorian Naturalist, the magazine of the Field Naturalists Club of Victoria of which he was a founding member.
