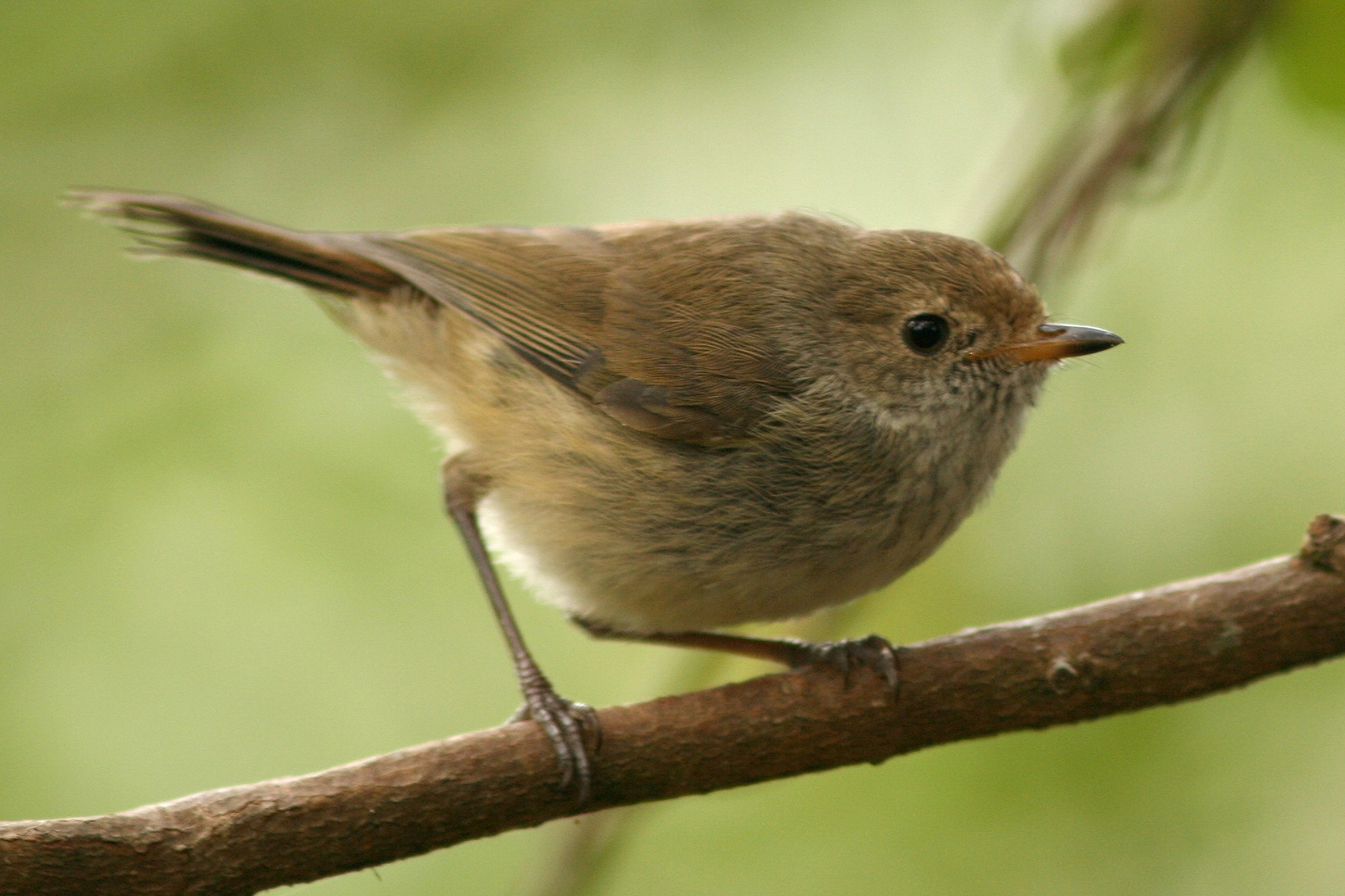
- Brown thornbill (Acanthiza pusilla)

Scientific classification
- Kingdom: Animalia
- Phylum: Chordata
- Class: Aves
- Order: Passeriformes
- Superfamily: Meliphagoidea
- Family: Acanthizidae; Bonaparte, 1854

Genera
- 15, see list

= Acanthizidae =

Family of birds

Acanthizidae—sometimes called Australian warblers—are a family of passerine birds which includes gerygones, thornbills Acanthiza, and scrubwrens Sericornis. The family Acanthizidae consists of small to medium passerine birds, with a total length varying between 8 and 19 centimetres (3.1 and 7.5 in). They have short rounded wings, slender bills, long legs, and a short tail. Most species have olive, grey, or brown plumage, although some have patches of a brighter yellow. The weebill is the smallest species of acanthizid, and the smallest Australian passerine; the largest is the pilotbird.

== Taxonomy and systematics ==
Following the Sibley-Ahlquist taxonomy (1990) they were previously regarded as subfamily Acanthizinae within the family Pardalotidae. More recent molecular genetic studies do not support this arrangement. The Dasyornithidae (which include the bristlebirds) are variously seen either as subfamily Dasyornithinae within the family Acanthizidae or Pardalotidae or as their own family (Schodde & Mason 1999). A molecular phylogenetic study published in 2019 found that the family Acanthizidae is sister to the pardalotes in the small family Pardalotidae. The pardalotes are native to Australia.

=== List of genera ===
The family contains 67 species divided in 15 genera.

- Pachycare – Goldenface Pachycare flavogriseum
- Oreoscopus – Fernwren Oreoscopus gutturalis
- Acanthornis – Scrubtit Acanthornis magna
- Smicrornis – Weebill Smicrornis brevirostris
- Calamanthus – Fieldwrens (three species)
- Hylacola – Heathwrens (two species)
- Pycnoptilus – Pilotbird Pycnoptilus floccosus
- Pyrrholaemus – Redthroat and Speckled Warbler (two species)
- Origma – Rockwarbler and two species of Mouse-Warblers (three species)
- Neosericornis – Yellow-throated Scrubwren Neosericornis citreogularis
- Aethomyias – Scrubwrens and Bicoloured Mouse-warbler (six species)
- Sericornis – Scrubwrens (eight species)
- Gerygone – Gerygones (20 species including one now extinct)
- Acanthiza – Thornbills (14 species)
- Aphelocephala – Whitefaces (three species)

== Distribution and habitat ==
Acanthizids are native to Australia, Indonesia, New Zealand, and the southwest Pacific. The greatest diversity is found in Australia, 35 endemic species, then New Guinea with 15. A species lives in Vanuatu, New Caledonia and the Solomon Islands, and a further three in the New Zealand region, including endemic species in the Chatham Islands and Norfolk Island. In Asia two species are restricted to Indonesia and another is found in the Philippines and on mainland Asia. Most species are sedentary, except the gerygones. The family occupies a range of habitats from rainforests to arid regions.

== Behaviour and ecology ==
Most species are terrestrial, feeding primarily on insects, although also eating some seeds. In particular the whitefaces consume large numbers of seeds, and other species will take fruits. The secretions of sap-sucking insects are favoured by some species, as are the insects themselves. Some species are less terrestrial, such as the weebill, which forages in the treetops, or the rock-dwelling rockwarbler. Rainforest species lay one to two eggs in a clutch, and species in the deserts and Tasmania lay three to four. Acanthizids are unusual for passerines in their long incubation periods, which rival those of large songbirds like the Corvidae. Also, despite their long incubation period hatching is completely synchronous and within-brood mortality completely absent. Acanthizids are relatively long-lived, with many species living to over ten years of age in the wild and cooperative breeding is found in the weebill and with a lesser degree of development in all whitefaces and most species of Sericornis and Acanthiza.

== Status and conservation ==
Most taxa are considered as least concern. One species – the Lord Howe gerygone (Gerygone insularis) – became extinct by rat predation in the early 1930s. The Norfolk Island gerygone (Gerygone modesta) is vulnerable and the chestnut-breasted whiteface (Aphelocephala pectoralis) is near threatened.

== Gallery ==
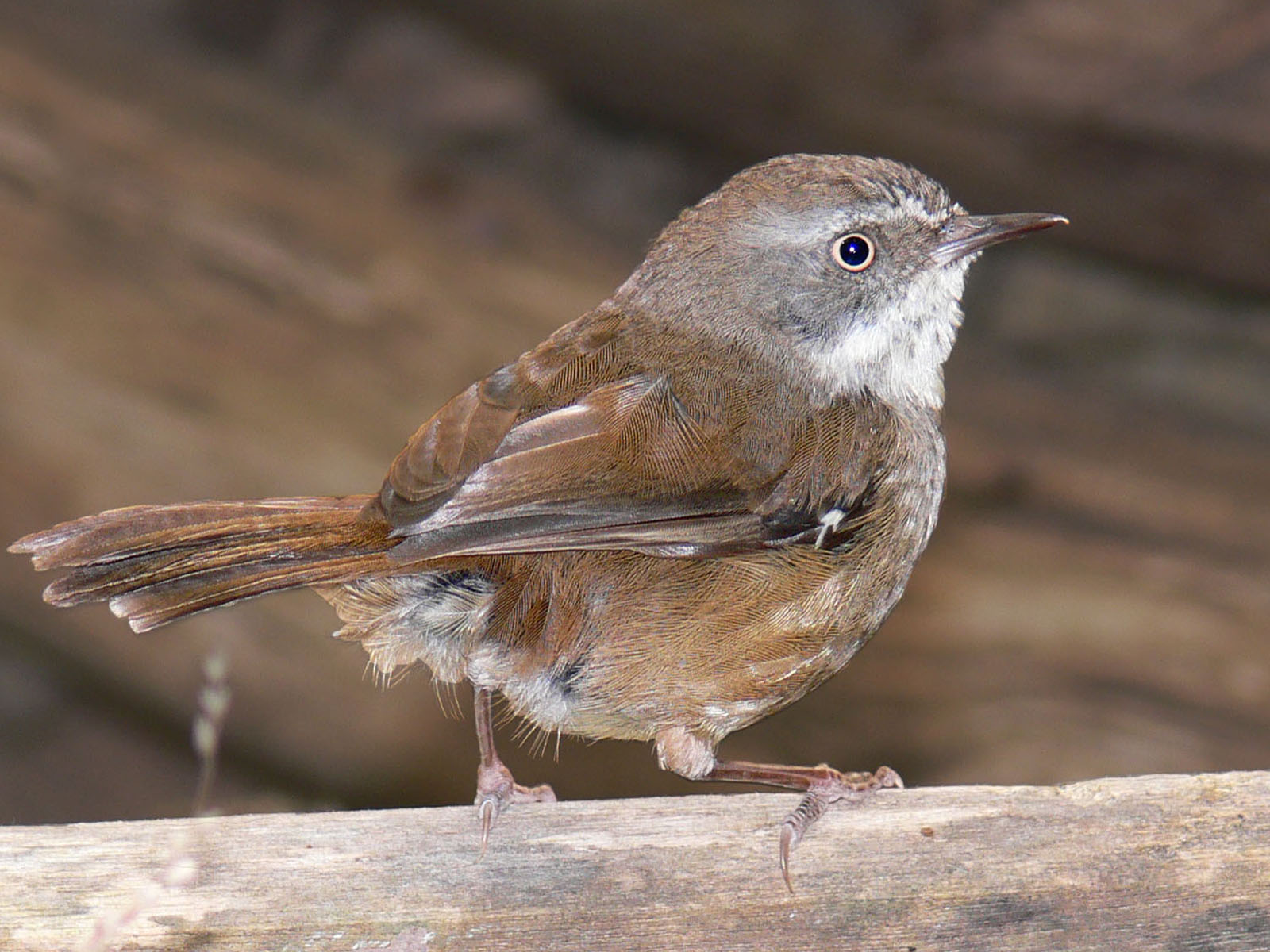
White-browed scrubwren (Sericornis frontalis)

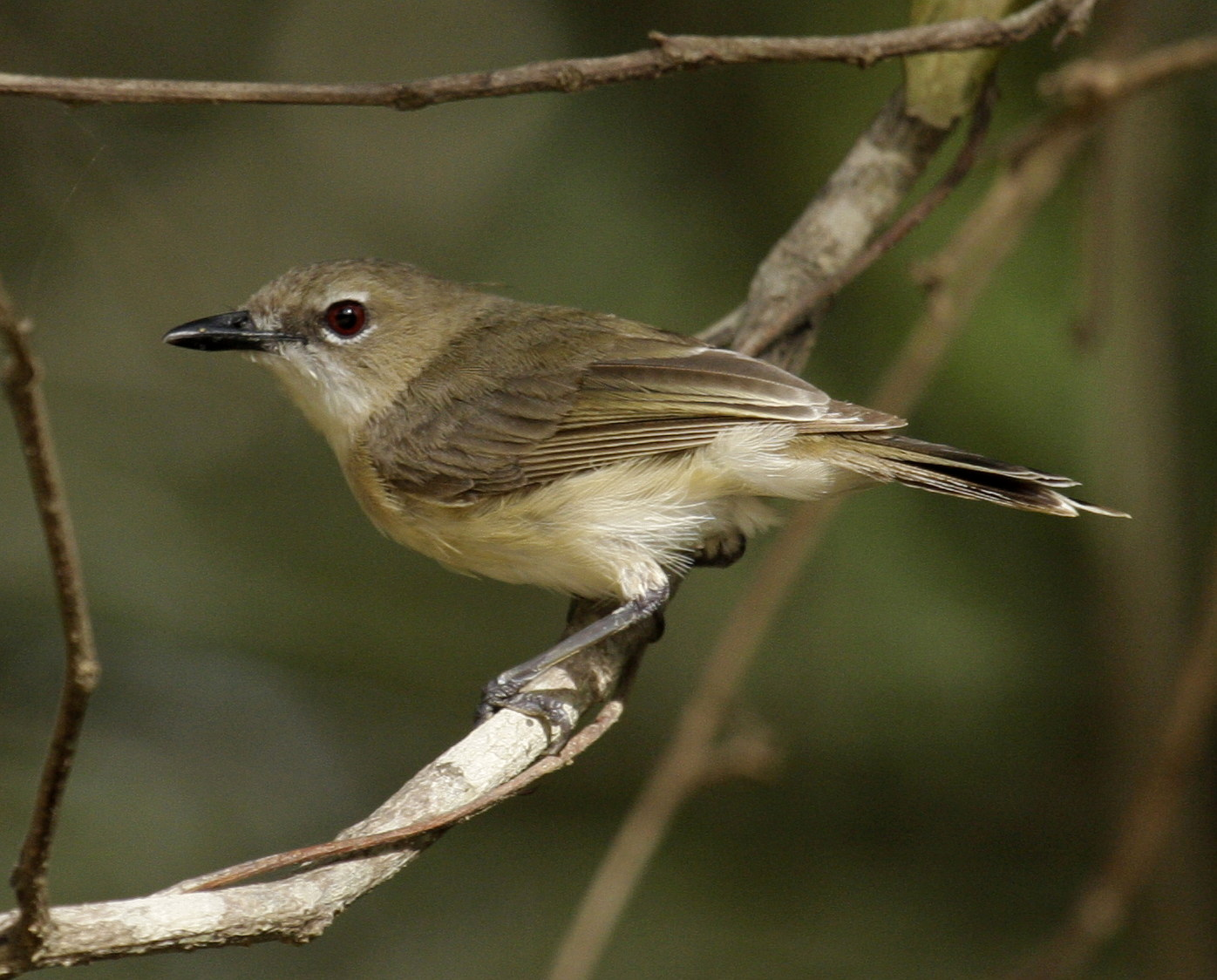
Large-billed gerygone (Gerygone magnirostris)

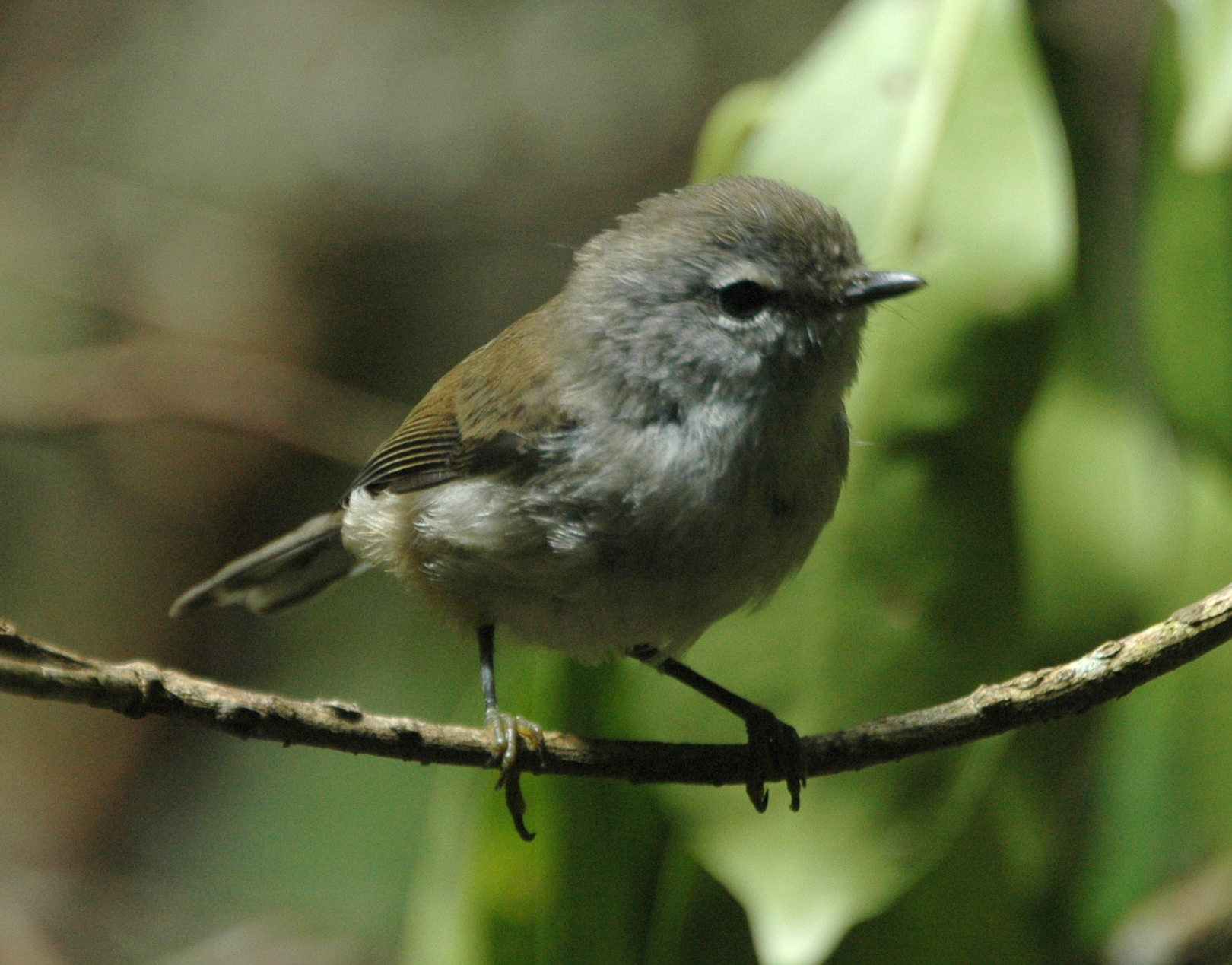
Brown gerygone (Gerygone mouki)

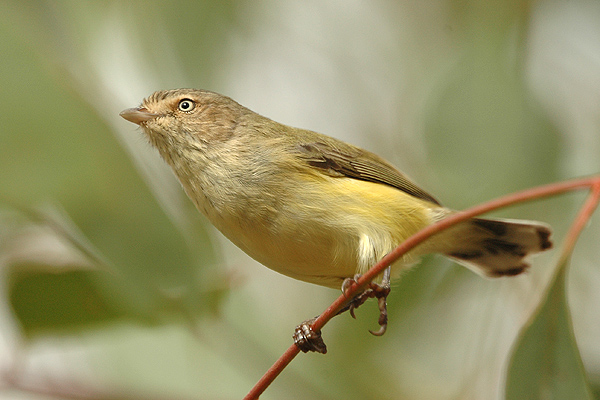
Weebill (Smicrornis brevirostris)

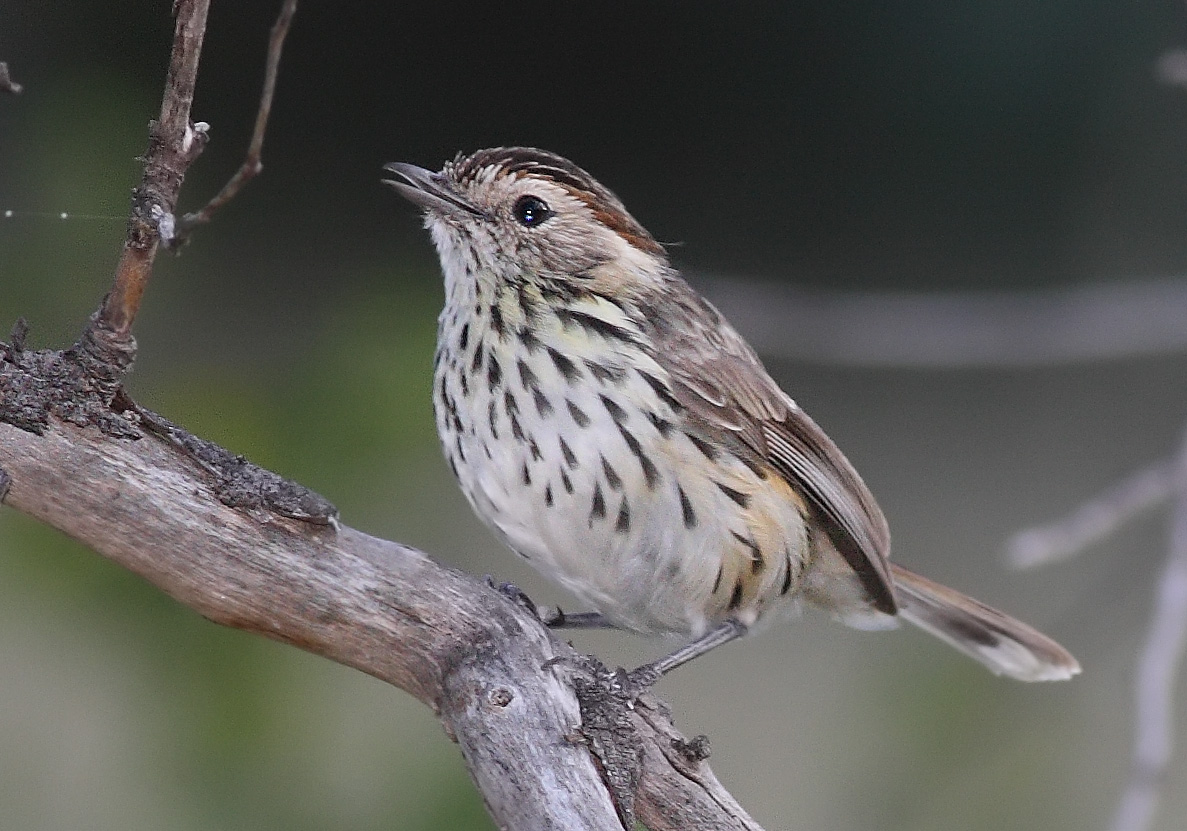
Speckled warbler (Chthonicola sagittatus)

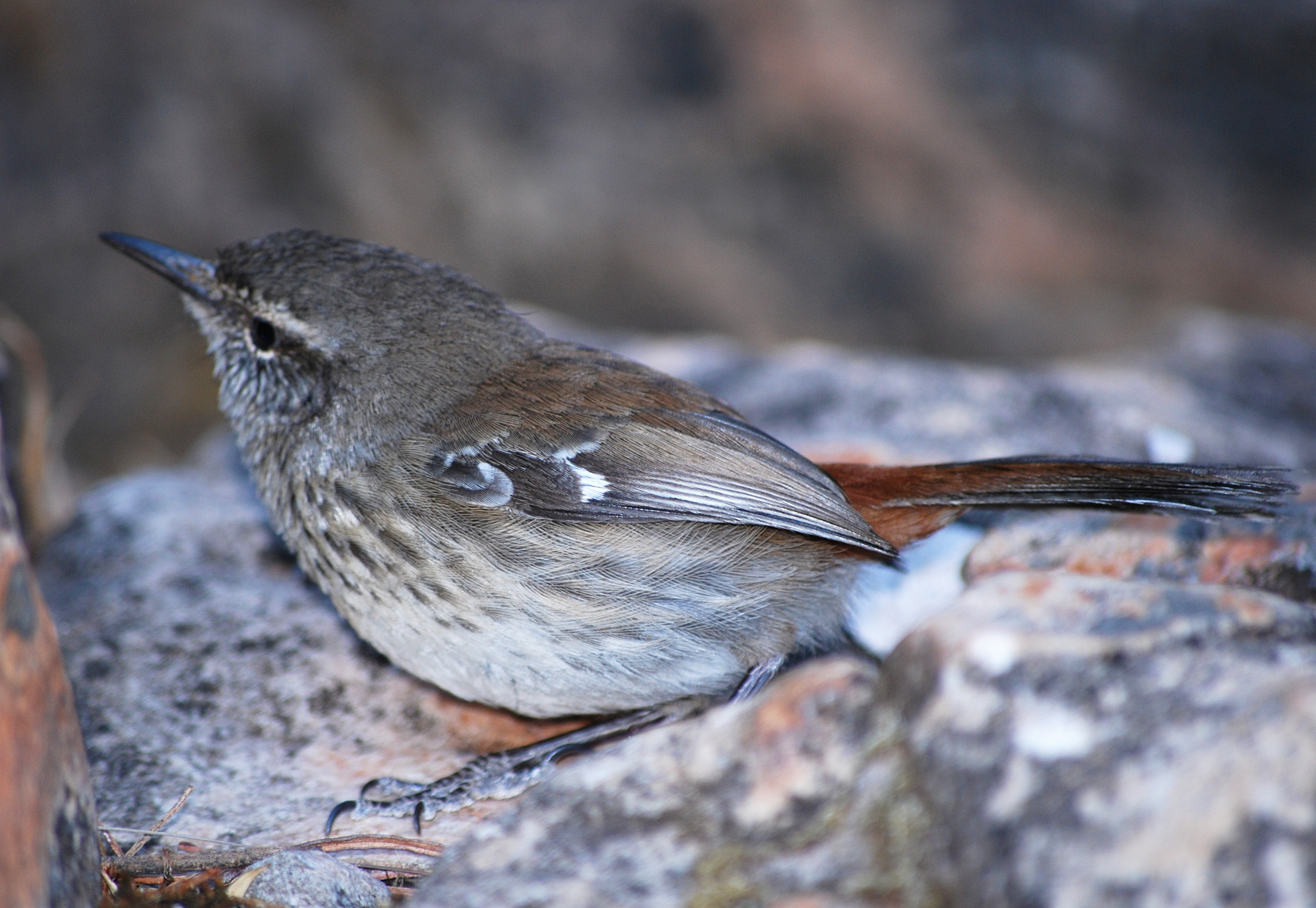
Shy heathwren (Hylacola cauta)

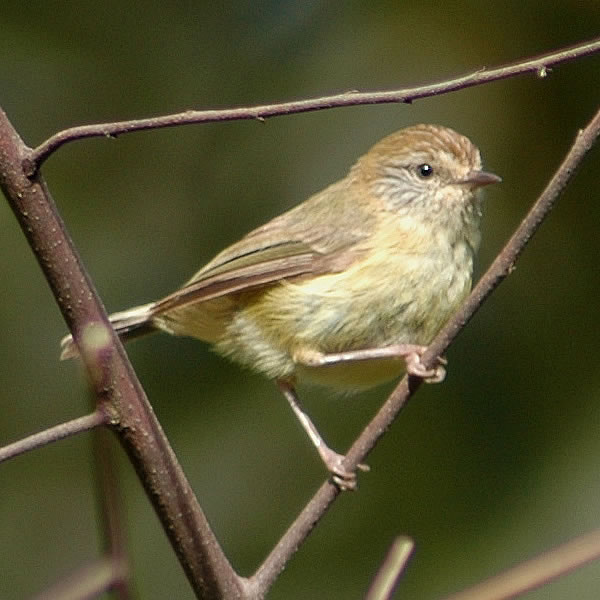
Yellow thornbill (Acanthiza nana)
