= Chiltern-Mt Pilot National Park =

National park in Victoria, Australia

Chiltern–Mt Pilot National Park
- IUCN category II (national park)
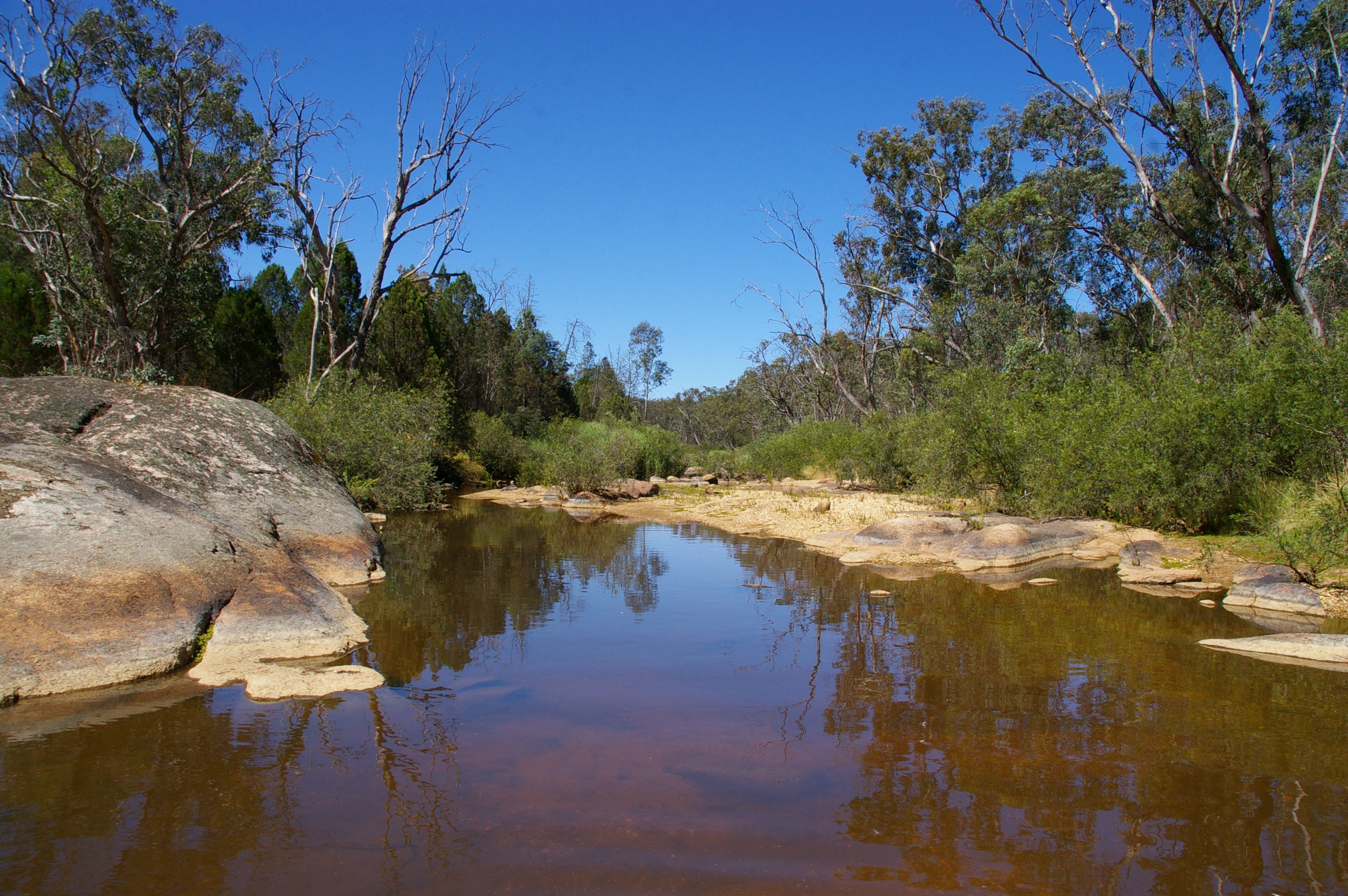
- Reedy Creek at Gladstone Track

- Location within Victoria
- Location: Victoria
- Nearest city: Chiltern
- Coordinates: 36°07′59″S 146°36′04″E
- Area: 215.6 km^{2} (83.2 sq mi)
- Established: 30 October 2002
- Governing body: Parks Victoria
- Website: http://parkweb.vic.gov.au/explore/parks/chiltern-mt-pilot-national-park

The Chiltern-Mt Pilot National Park is a national park in the Hume region of Victoria, Australia. The 21,650-hectare (53,500-acre) national park is situated approximately 275 kilometres (171 mi) northeast of Melbourne, and extends west from Beechworth across the Hume Freeway and the Albury-Melbourne railway line to the west of Chiltern.

The park was established under the National Parks (Box–Ironbark and Other Parks) Act, 2002 (Vic) to protect a diverse range of threatened species and ecosystems. The distinctive features of the park include the Woolshed Falls, picturesque Mt Pilot summit, culturally significant Aboriginal rock art at Yeddonba and historical relics of the goldmining era scattered throughout. The park is used for a number of recreational activities including bushwalking, hiking, trail riding, rock climbing, picnicking, camping, bird watching and prospecting.

== Background ==
=== History ===
At the time of European settlement, box-ironbark forests covered approximately 3,000,000 hectares (7,400,000 acres) or 13% of Victoria. As a result of settlement, nearly 80% of these forests were cleared and the remaining areas were badly degraded by grazing. The forests of the Chiltern-Mt Pilot National Park are living testament to these claims with some of its natural systems deteriorated as a result of grazing, clearing, logging and mining.

When gold was discovered in the area during the mid-1800s, extensive alluvial and reef mining, quartz mining and gravel quarrying began. Fossicking, prospecting and gem hunting are still permitted within the park today. Evidence of these activities including disturbed ground, mullock heaps, dams and old mineshafts may be found scattered throughout the park.

Pastoralists driving cattle through Chiltern, known at the time as Black Dog Creek, discovered the forests of box and ironbark during the 1930s. The species were renowned for their strong durable timber and soon felled for fencing, construction and firewood. In fact, firewood collection continued until 2002 when the National Park was formed. A landscape that was originally dominated by large, mature trees and grassy forest floors quickly deteriorated into closely packed stands of multi-stemmed coppice regrowth.

The clearing of land for agriculture and grazing impacted negatively on this landscape. Grazing continued through the Chiltern section of the park until the 1980s and the Mt Pilot section until the 1990s. Common problems associated with these activities including the introduction of pest species, soil compaction and erosion, increased salinity and habitat fragmentation were all reported as a result.

=== Park establishment ===
The Chiltern-Mt Pilot National Park is an amalgamation of two separate parks, each with distinct geological, historical and ecological profiles.

The Chiltern Regional Park, first known as the Chiltern State Park, was a 4,250-hectare (10,500-acre) Box-ironbark forest that was reserved in 1980 following the 1977 Land Conservation Council (LCC) recommendations. The Mt Pilot Multipurpose Park was also established under the 1977 LCC recommendations. The Environment Conservation Council (ECC) replaced the LCC in 1997 and gave rise to the Chiltern Box-ironbark National Park of 4,320 hectares (10,700 acres).

When the Victorian State parliament gave assent to the National Parks (Box–Ironbark and Other Parks) Act, 2002 (Vic) it initiated the creation of a highly protected system of parks and reserves. The Chiltern Box-ironbark National Park and the Mt Pilot Multipurpose Park, in addition to Woolshed falls and surrounding land, were brought together to form Chiltern-Mt Pilot National Park as it is known today.

== Ecology ==
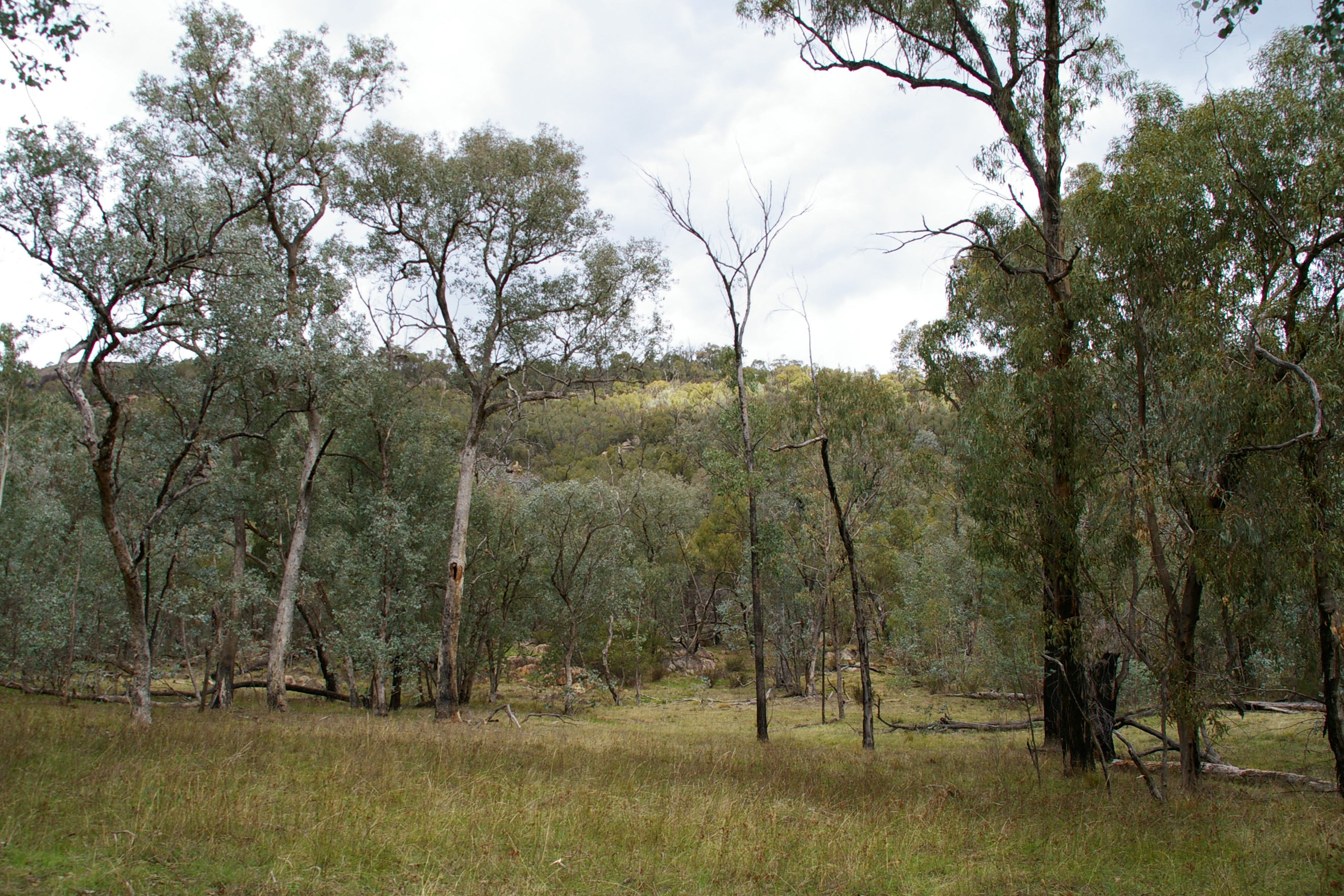
Woodland in Mt Pilot section

The Chiltern-Mt Pilot National Park falls within the Victorian Riverina and Northern Inland Slopes sub-bioregions. The Chiltern section of the park comprises low-lying hills formed from Ordovician sedimentary rock which are distinctly contrast to the rugged Devonian granite of the Mt Pilot section. The park protects a total 18 ecological vegetation classes (EVCs) of which four are threatened: Box-Ironbark, Spring-soak Woodland, Gilgai Plain Woodland/Wetland Mosaic and the Valley Grassy Forest. The park supports over 600 native species of flora and has the most intact assemblage of fauna with more birds, mammals and reptiles recorded than any other Box-ironbark forest. Most notably, the Chiltern-Mt Pilot National Park provides a critical habitat for the recovery of the barking owl (Ninox connivens) and brush-tailed phascogale (Phascogale tapoatafa). It is part of the Warby–Chiltern Box–Ironbark region Important Bird Area, identified as such by BirdLife International because of its importance for the conservation of Box–Ironbark forest ecosystems and several species of threatened woodland birds dependent on them.

=== Fauna ===
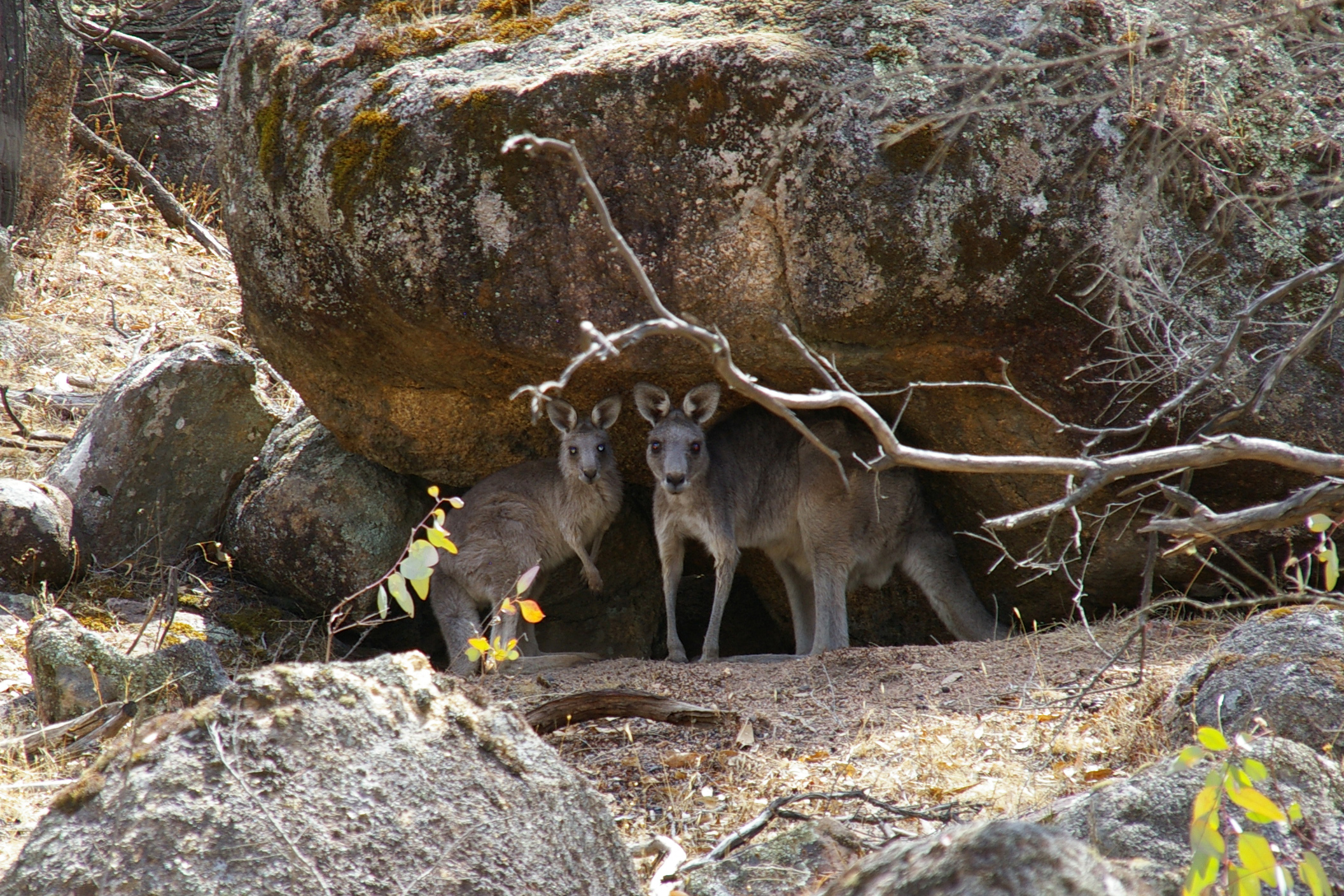
Grey kangaroos

The park supports a diverse range of native fauna with 276 different species of mammals, birds and reptiles being reported. As well as common species including the grey kangaroo (Macropus giganteus), koala (Phascolarctos cinereus) and laughing kookaburra (Dacelo novaeguineae), the park is home to 43 fauna species listed as threatened; 21 one of which are listed under the Victorian Flora and Fauna Guarantee Act 1988. Some significant species are described in more detail below.

==== Squirrel glider ====
The squirrel glider (Petaurus norfolcensis) is a small to medium-sized arboreal marsupial that occupies a vast range of habitats throughout Eastern Australia. It is listed as a threatened species under the FFG Act 1988. The gliders have highly specific feeding and nesting requirements and use trees to move through the landscape. Consequently, they are highly susceptible to changes in forest conditions. Squirrel gliders have a reported home range size of approximately 3.9 hectares (9.6 acres) in northeast Victoria. This size can vary greatly and is strongly influenced by the availability of food and the quality of the forest habitat. The glider's diet consists of arthropods, nectars and insect exudates with foraging accounting for a high proportion of their nocturnal activity. Most of their time is spent in living eucalypt trees with a strong preference for large, mature trees in flower. Gliders use dead trees to shelter in and facilitate movement through the forest.

==== Brush-tail phascogale ====
Brush-tail phascogales (Phascogale tapoatafa) are small carnivorous, arboreal marsupials that are solitary by nature. They breed once per year with all males dying at the end of each breeding season. These mammals are widely distributed across Australia but habitat loss and degradation following European settlement in Victoria has meant this species is now listed as threatened. The average home range size for females is 41 hectares (100 acres) and for males it often exceeds 100 hectares (250 acres).

Phascogales are regarded as foraging generalists with invertebrates comprising the bulk of their diet. Foraging in trees accounts for up to 90% of their nocturnal activity with larger trees offering greater surface areas for phascogales to forage on. Large remnant trees also contain more hollows and potential nest sites than smaller trees. Phascogales typically occupy living trees of large diameter and it is not uncommon for them to maintain multiple nests across the majority of their home range. For these reasons, sites that offer mature, evenly spaced trees and well connected patches are considered the most suitable habitats.

==== Barking owl ====
The barking owl (Ninox connivens) is listed as threatened under the Victorian Flora and Fauna Guarantee Act. It is one of the largest native predators remaining in southern Australia and renowned for its unique prey holding behaviour. As a predator, the owls have comparatively low abundance and require a constant source of high-energy food which makes them particularly vulnerable to habitat fragmentation and degradation. This highly territorial species has an average home range of approximately 1,400 hectares (3,500 acres) and requires large trees to maintain diurnal roosts. With one of the largest body sizes of any hollow-depended species in Australia, mature trees are essential to provide cavities big enough for nesting. A combination of drought and brushfire over the past ten years has led to a significant reduction in the number of breeding pairs residing in the Mt Pilot area. The Chiltern-Mt Pilot National Park is now a critical habitat for the recovery of this species.

==== Regent honeyeater ====
Populations of regent honeyeaters (Xanthomyza phrygia) were historically concentrated in three locations around Adelaide, northeast Victoria and central-east New South Wales, but are now locally extinct in South Australia. They are considered to be nationally endangered with a population of approximately 1500 individuals remaining. The honeyeater typically inhabits eucalypt woodland and dry open forests. Their diets consist principally of insects and nectar and are occasionally supplemented with fruits. Honeyeaters observed in northeast Victoria demonstrate a preference for box-ironbark forest, particularly the nectar from yellow gum (Eucalyptus leucoxylon) and winter flowering red ironbark (Eucalyptus tricarpa).

==== Other species ====
In addition to the species described above, the Chiltern-Mt Pilot National Park is home to a number of other significant fauna species. These include the painted honeyeater (Grantiella picta), swift parrot (Lathamus discolor), turquoise parrot (Neophema pulchella), square-tailed kite (Lophoictinia isura), spot-tailed quoll (Cinclosoma punctatum), bandy bandy (Vermicella annulata), woodland blind snake (Ramphotyphlops proximus) and brown toadlet (Pseudophryne bibronii).

=== Flora ===
The Chiltern-Mt Pilot National Park protects 42 threatened species of flora of which ten are listed under the Flora and Fauna Guarantee Act (Vic). This includes a range of species such as the crimson spider orchid (Caladenia concolor), yellow hyacinth-orchid (Dipodium hamiltonianum), sturdy leek orchid (Prasophyllum validum), Warby swamp gum (Eucalyptus cadens), mountain swainson-pea (Swainsona recta) and the narrow goodenia (Goodenia macbarronii) that are listed as endangered or vulnerable in Victoria. Other significant flora species found within the park are described below.

==== Red ironbark ====
Red ironbark (Eucalyptus sideroxylon), also known as mugga ironbark, grows to a height of 10–30 metres (33–98 ft) in open forests along the inland slopes of the Great Dividing Range in Victoria, New South Wales and southern Queensland. Flowering occurs throughout the year with seven small flower buds in umbels appearing in the axils of mature leaves. Small fruits measuring 5–8 millimetres (0.20–0.31 in) appear approximately one month after flowering. Leaf size is known to vary in response to environmental factors including water availability and soil composition. Both the swift parrot and regent honeyeater visit the park during winter to take advantage of the red ironbark's peak flowering period.

==== Black cypress pine ====
The park has the largest reserved population of black cypress pine (Callitris endlicheri) in Victoria. The native conifer is commonly found in the hilly areas of southeast Australia where the climates are relatively warm and dry. The monoecious species is wind pollinated and described as having mostly erect branches, tough furrowed bark and dark green foliage. The species exhibits strong drought tolerance and an ability to survive in densely crowded strands though the rate of maturation can be slowed under these conditions. The pine is vulnerable to changes in rainfall and grazing pressure from rabbits and deer. The pine is highly susceptible to fire and mortality usually follows exposure. The Chiltern-Mt Pilot pine population was severely affected by the 2003 Eldorado fire. This places the species at greater risk of local extinction from future fires, particularly if two fires were to occur in close succession.

==== Mt Pilot spider orchid ====
The Mt Pilot spider orchid (Caladenia pilotensis) is a rare orchid species currently listed as threatened under the Flora and Fauna Guarantee Act (Vic) and endangered by the Department of Sustainability and Environment (DSE). The species is described as having a hairy stem that grows to approximately 35 centimetres (14 in) in height, a single basal leaf and light green to yellow coloured flower with pale red shading. The deciduous herb originates from a population of approximately 100 individuals located inside a 10 kilometres (6.2 mi) radius in the Mt-Pilot section of the park. It can be found in four small groups on the well-drained soils of the open grassy forest floor. Little is known about the ecology of this orchid but it is reported that pollination is severely restricted or absent in small populations. This problem is exacerbated by a decline in the rate of flowering as the eucalyptus forests recover from the 2003 bushfires. The risk of local extinction is high owing to the small population size and the threat of animal grazing, soil disturbance and weed invasion.

==== Blakely’s red gum ====
Blakely's red gum (Eucalyptus blakelyi) is a common native Australian eucalypt found on the inland slopes of the Great Dividing Range in New South Wales and Victoria. The evergreen tree grows to a height of 25 metres (82 ft) and flowers predominantly between November and December on a two to three-year cycle depending on environmental conditions. Seedling establishment is affected by common factors including temperature, light, litter accumulation, grazing, fire, frost and insect predation.

== Environmental threats ==
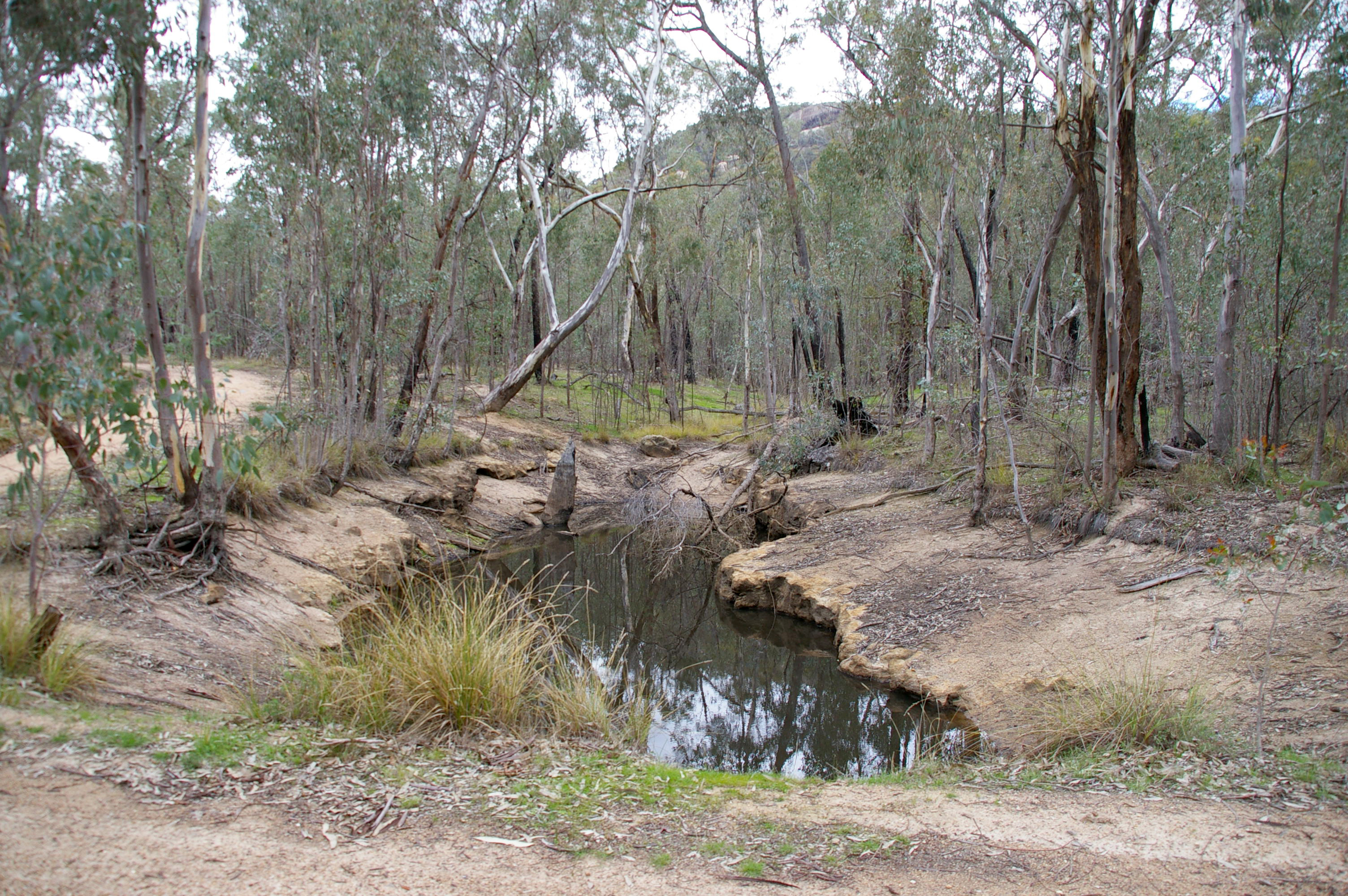
Erosion prone soils of Mt Pilot section.

Northeast Victoria is susceptible to periodic natural disasters including fire, flood and drought. Major bushfires have occurred in the Chiltern-Mt Pilot National Park in 1899, 1912, 1927, 1940 and 2003. Bushfires in National Parks are likely to lead to the loss of conservation areas, significant species and communities and park infrastructure including toilet blocks, picnic areas, lookouts, car parks, signage and tracks. While some species benefit from burns through heat activated germination, others like the isolated populations of black cypress pine or Mount Pilot spider orchids may face local extinction.

Flood events and heavy rains have the potential to result in severe erosion given the park's duplex soils and steep inclines. During flood events, contaminants such as mercury can be mobilised and transformed into chemicals that jeopardize the health of the park's aquatic systems. It is likely that past mining practices have led to heavy metal contamination in the park's waterways and sediments.

Pest plants including Blackberry (Rubus fruticosus), bridal creeper (Asparagus asparagoides), furze (Ulex europaeus) and paterson's curse (Echium plantagineum) have been identified as problematic weeds within the park that pose a threat to native flora populations. St John's Wort (Hypericum perforatum) and prickly pear (Opuntia ficus-indica) occurring in the Mt Pilot Range have been brought under control but continued management is required. Pest animals known to occur within the park include the red fox (Vulpes vulpes), European rabbit (Oryctolagus cuniculus) and feral cat (Felis catus). Foxes and cats pose serious predation risks to native fauna while rabbits impact on native flora and are notorious for the degree of soil disturbance caused by burrowing.

== Park management ==
=== Approach ===
The Chiltern Mt-Pilot National Park Management Plan was prepared in October 2008 in accordance with the National Parks Act 1975 (Vic) s 17. The plan outlines the park's values and attractions and sets the basis and future direction for its long term management and protection. Key elements of the plan include the protection of threatened species and ecological communities, protection of Indigenous culture and history, invasive species management, sustainable recreation, tourism and support for community based management and participation.

The management plan was prepared by Parks Victoria using evidence from existing reports and studies of the area, a best practise approach and community consultation. The plan clearly articulates the park's significance and values in terms of natural resources, culture, history, tourism and recreation as well as providing an extensive list of legislative requirements and ECC recommendations with which it complies. As a model for the management of landscape diversity, there is significant emphasis placed on conservation and protection through zoning. Zoning is said to reflect the park's management priorities by assisting with the protection of sensitive and fragile environments and minimising the impact of potentially harmful activities.

=== Outcomes ===
A community based approach to natural resource management is reflected through collaborative partnerships with groups including Friends, Landcare and other volunteers who play an active role in monitoring and research activities. The Friends of Chiltern-Mt Pilot National Park Inc. report that a range of activities have been undertaken since 2009 including removal of weeds, tree planting, site maintenance, sign posting, monitoring of nesting boxes, release of captive bred species and counting of significant species.

== See also ==
- Protected areas of Victoria
