= Warby =

Warby is a surname, and may refer to:

- Ed Warby (born 1968), Dutch musician
- Ken Warby (born 1939), Australian motorboat racer
- Mark Warby (born 1958), judge of the High Court of England and Wales

== See also ==
- Clavy-Warby, a commune in the Ardennes department in northern France
- Warby–Chiltern Box–Ironbark Region, a cluster of separate blocks of remnant box-ironbark forest habitat in Victoria, Australia
- Warby-Ovens National Park, a national park located in the Hume region of Victoria, Australia
- Warby Range State Park, a former state park in Victoria, Australia, since 2010 a part of Warby-Ovens National Park
- Warby Parker, an American brand of prescription eyeglasses and sunglasses founded in 2010
