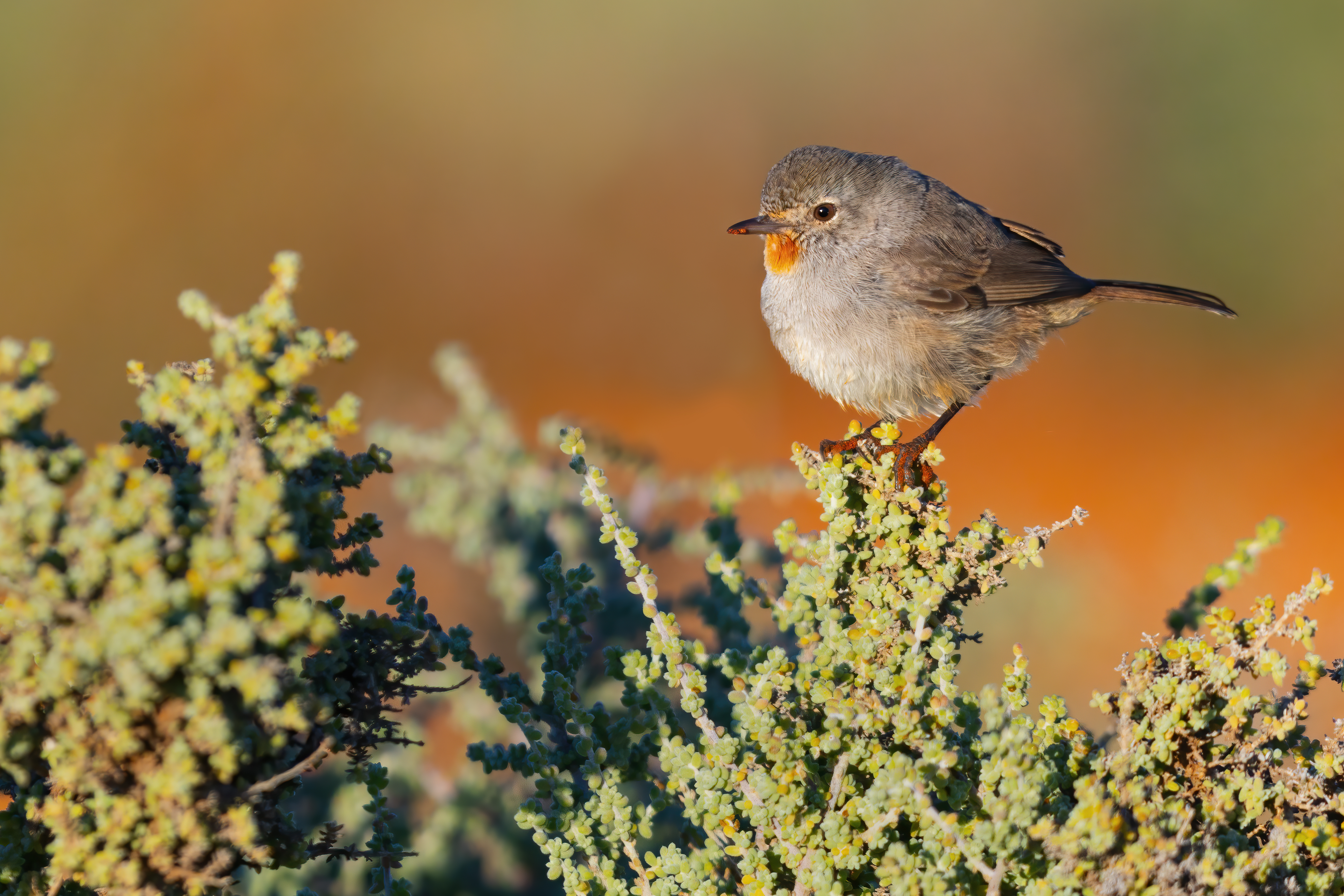
- Redthroat at top.

Conservation status
- Least Concern (IUCN 3.1)

Scientific classification
- Kingdom: Animalia
- Phylum: Chordata
- Class: Aves
- Order: Passeriformes
- Family: Acanthizidae
- Genus: Pyrrholaemus
- Species: P. brunneus

Binomial name
- Pyrrholaemus brunneus Gould, 1841

= Redthroat =

Species of bird

The redthroat (Pyrrholaemus brunneus) is a small, mostly ground-dwelling species of bird in the family Acanthizidae. It is endemic to Australia, occurring mostly in arid and semi-arid areas containing acacia and chenopod shrublands. The species has a distinctive red throat patch and is able to mimic the calls of numerous other bird species.

== Taxonomy ==
The first formal description of the redthroat was by the English ornithologist and bird artist John Gould in 1841 under the present binomial name Pyrrholaemus brunneus. The name of the genus Pyrrholaemus is from classical Greek pyrrhos meaning 'flame-coloured' or 'red' and laimos for 'throat'. The specific epithet brunneus is modern Latin for 'brown'. The redthroat is a small passerine bird within the family Acanthizidae, also known as the Australasian warblers. The Acanthizidae were once regarded as a subfamily within the family Pardalotidae; although current revisions place the Acanthizidae in their own family, sister to the Pardalotidae. The species most closely related to the redthroat are the speckled warbler (Chthonicola sagittata), which was previously classified in the same genus as the redthroat (Pyrrholaemus), and the pilotbird (Pycnoptilus floccosus). Recent phylogenetic studies have found that this clade of species (Pyrrholaemus-Chthonicola-Pyncnoptilus) is sister to the heathwrens and fieldwrens (Hylacola-Calamanthus).

== Description ==
A small 11–12 cm (4.3–4.7 in) shy greyish-brown bird, the redthroat is most often seen swiftly darting through low branches and shrubs or hopping mouse-like on the ground. Only adult males have the distinctive small, rusty-brown throat patch, which gives the species its common name and the absence of which makes the identification of females and juveniles more difficult. The upper part of the head, body, wings, and tail are a dark brownish-grey, particularly dark on the rump and tail. While the underbody is predominantly whitish-grey, with a more whitish belly and pale buff colour blending into the flanks and undertail-coverts. The tail has prominent white patches on the tips of the outer feathers, which can be seen during flight and with the tail folded. Fine off-white scalloping is visible on the forehead, with off-white eye rings and lores merging into the lighter underparts of the body. It may be confused with some thornbill species, which are more compact with a shorter tail than the redthroat. It is unlikely to be mistaken for fieldwrens or heathwrens, which have a more strongly upturned tail at rest.

The melodious call, similar to that of a canary, has sustained warbling and loud cheery notes. In addition to its own calls, the redthroat is able to mimic the calls of numerous other birds, including the pied butcherbird, rufous fieldwren, grey fantail, fairywrens, and thornbills. The redthroat has even been known to mimic the non-vocal sound of whistling wingbeats made by a crested pigeon in flight. Although both sexes call throughout the year, during the breeding season male calls are more sustained. The species is vocal when foraging and will also sing while perched atop shrubs and taller trees.

== Distribution ==
The redthroat is endemic to mainland Australia, occurring in all states and territories, except the Australian Capital Territory and Tasmania. The species is most prevalent in Western Australia and South Australia. It has a widespread but scattered distribution throughout most of South Australia. In Western Australia, the species is not present in the far north or the south-east, but is prevalent throughout the mid-latitudes of the state. In the Northern Territory, the species is restricted to the south of the state, around the Simpson Desert and the MacDonnell Ranges. In Queensland, the species is restricted to inland south-western regions. In Victoria, the species is restricted to the mallee regions in the northwest of the state. In New South Wales, the species is only known to occur in the far west, in several core populations, including Broken Hill, Tibooburra, Penarie and Nearie Lake Nature Reserve.

The species is thought to be mostly sedentary, with no evidence to suggest seasonal migration. Individuals recaptured after banding have all been found within 10 kilometres (6.21 miles) of the banding site.

== Habitat ==
The habitat of the redthroat consists primarily of arid and semi-arid regions of inland Australia, but it also occupies some coastal areas, as well as plains and rangelands. Communities it favours are most often acacia and chenopod shrublands. These communities are usually characterised by an overstory of mulga (Acacia aneura), red mulga (A. cyperophylla), or lacewood (A. shirleyi) with an understory of saltbush (Atriplex spp.), bluebush (Chenopodium spp.) or emu bush (Eremophila spp.). However, in some areas the species is known to occur in mallee with a diverse understory, semi-arid woodlands, Banksia and tea tree thickets and shrublands with an overstory of white cypress. The consistent feature among these habitats appears to be the presence of a complex understory, which provides suitable foraging and nesting resources for this shy, mostly ground-dwelling species.

== Diet and foraging behaviour ==
Redthroats are omnivores with a diet consisting of seeds from grasses and shrubs as well as a broad variety of invertebrates, such as spiders, insects, and gastropods. Observations of redthroat foraging behaviour found that the species predominantly forages at heights of less than 1m (73% of observations) and was not observed foraging at heights greater than 3m. This study found that redthroats feed mostly by pouncing on prey from the ground or gleaning in low vegetation, with very few instances of hunting on the wing. Another study of foraging behaviour found that all observations of foraging occurred on the ground (<0.1 m), using a combination of gleaning and probing.

== Breeding and nesting ==
Breeding mostly occurs between June–December with some geographic variation in timing. Little is known about sexual behaviour, although the species appears to breed in pairs. Nests are relatively large for a bird of its size 9–14 centimetres (3.54–5.51 in), often domed, spherical or domed with a round entrance near the top 2.5–4 centimetres (0.98–1.57 in). They are usually constructed of bark strips and bark fibre, often lined with feathers, fur or soft plant material. Nests are located on or close to the ground among shrubs, grass tussocks, at the base of trees, in fallen logs or in small depressions. Two to four eggs are laid and the female is solely responsible for incubating the eggs. The redthroat and the closely related speckled warbler are the only members of the acanthizids that have a solid coloured chocolate-brown egg. Furthermore, the redthroat (and the speckled warbler) are the primary host species of some brood parasites, such as the black-eared cuckoo (Chrysococcyx osculans)and fan-tailed cuckoo (Cacomantis flabelliformis), which remove redthroat eggs from the nest and lay their own similar looking eggs.

== Conservation status ==
Populations of redthroats have declined in many areas throughout Australia and the species is subject to many threatening processes. This has warranted its conservation listing in New South Wales and Victoria as follows:

- The redthroat is listed as threatened on the Victorian Flora and Fauna Guarantee Act (1988). Under this Act, an Action Statement for the recovery and future management of this species has not yet been prepared.
- On the 2013 advisory list of threatened vertebrate fauna in Victoria, the redthroat is listed as endangered.
- The redthroat is listed at vulnerable under the NSW Threatened Species Conservation Act (1995)

In New South Wales, several threatening processes affecting redthroat populations have been formally identified, including the following:

- Clearing of suitable vegetation communities can cause range contractions and isolate populations.
- Overgrazing by feral herbivores, particularly goats, can cause habitat degradation and prevent habitat regeneration for the species.
- The infestation of suitable habitat by the noxious environmental weed Mesquite also impacts habitat values and foraging resources.
- Given that redthroats are predominantly ground-dwelling and nesting birds, they are also highly susceptible to predation by exotic predators, such as foxes and cats.

Although the species is not yet federally listed under the Environment Protection and Biodiversity Conservation Act 1999, the threatening processes listed above are present throughout most of the species distribution. The ongoing impacts of land clearing, noxious weeds, introduced herbivores, and introduced predators are likely to cause further declines throughout the species range, which may warrant further environmental protection measures.
