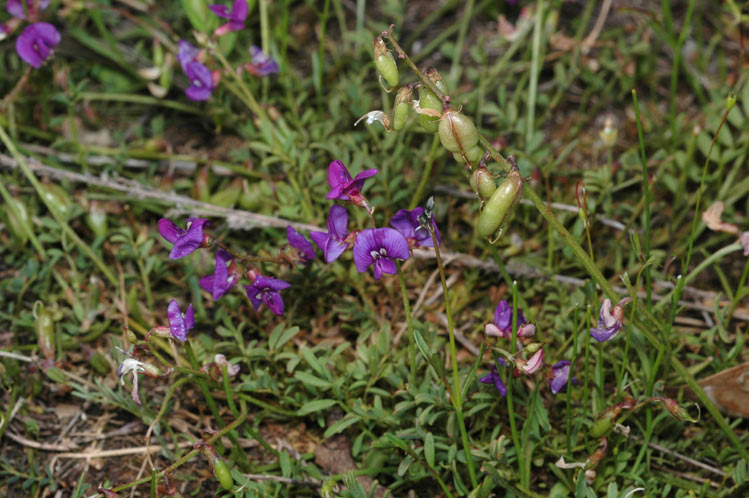
- Near Barmedman

Scientific classification
- Kingdom: Plantae
- Clade: Tracheophytes
- Clade: Angiosperms
- Clade: Eudicots
- Clade: Rosids
- Order: Fabales
- Family: Fabaceae
- Subfamily: Faboideae
- Genus: Swainsona
- Species: S. similis

Binomial name
- Swainsona similis Joy Thomps.

Synonyms
- Swainsona parviflora var. vestita C.T.White & W.D.Francis

= Swainsona similis =

Species of plant

Swainsona similis is a species of flowering plant in the family Fabaceae and is endemic to inland eastern Australia. It is an erect or spreading perennial plant with imparipinnate leaves with 5 to 15 narrowly elliptic leaflets and racemes of 5 to 15 purple flowers.

== Description ==
Swainsona similis is an erect or spreading perennial plant that typically grows to a height of up to about 25 cm (9.8 in), and has sparsely-hairy stems. Its leaves are imparipinnate, about 50 mm (2.0 in) long with 5 to 15 narrowly elliptic leaflets, the side leaflets usually 5–8 mm (0.20–0.31 in) long and 1–2 mm (0.039–0.079 in) wide. There is a stipule 1–6 mm (0.039–0.236 in) long at the base of the petiole. The flowers are arranged in racemes 100–250 mm (3.9–9.8 in) long with 5 to 15 flowers on a peduncle 0.5–1.5 mm (0.020–0.059 in) wide, each flower 6–7 mm (0.24–0.28 in) long on a pedicel about 0.5–1.5 mm (0.020–0.059 in) long. The sepals are joined at the base, forming a tube about 2 mm (0.079 in) long, the sepal lobes about as long as the tube. The petals are purple, the standard petal 7–11 mm (0.28–0.43 in) long and wide, the wings about 5.5–9 mm (0.22–0.35 in) long, and the keel about 5.5–7 mm (0.22–0.28 in) long and 2.5 mm (0.098 in) deep. The fruit is 6–15 mm (0.24–0.59 in) long and 5–8 mm (0.20–0.31 in) wide.

== Taxonomy and naming ==
Swainsona similis was first formally described in 1990 by Joy Thompson in the journal Telopea from specimens she collected near Brewarrina in 1968. The specific epithet (similis) refers to this species' similarity to S. recta and S. parviflora.

== Distribution and habitat ==
This species of pea grows in red soil in grassland or open woodland, on the western plains of New South Wales and inland parts of southern Queensland.
