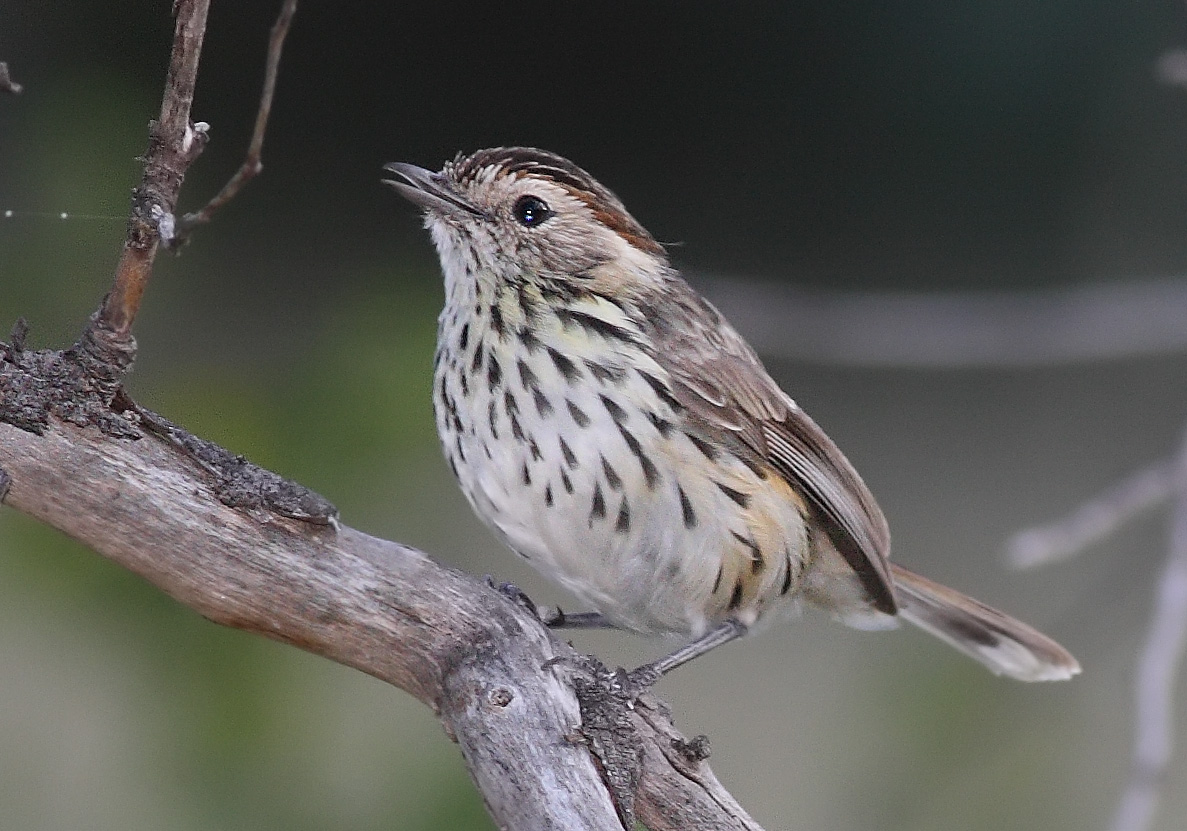

Conservation status
- Least Concern (IUCN 3.1)

Scientific classification
- Kingdom: Animalia
- Phylum: Chordata
- Class: Aves
- Order: Passeriformes
- Family: Acanthizidae
- Genus: Pyrrholaemus
- Species: P. sagittatus

Binomial name
- Pyrrholaemus sagittatus (Latham, 1801)

Synonyms
- Chthonicola sagittatus

= Speckled warbler =

Species of bird

The speckled warbler (Pyrrholaemus sagittatus) is a species of bird in the family Acanthizidae. It is endemic to eastern Australia. Its natural habitat is temperate forests.

== Taxonomy ==
The speckled warbler was first described by English physician and ornithologist John Latham in 1801. It was earlier grouped with the scrubwrens in Sericornis and then in the monotypic genus Chthonicola. Morphological similarities and DNA studies now place it as a sister taxon with the redthroat in the genus Pyrrholaemus. It is monotypic, having no subspecies. The generic name Pyrrholaemus is from classical Greek pyrrhos meaning 'flame-coloured, red' and laimos 'throat'. The specific epithet is the Latin sagittatus 'shot with arrows', referring to the bird's streaked chest. Other common names are blood tit, chocolate-bird, little fieldwren and speckled jack.

== Description ==
The speckled warbler is a small, ground-dwelling warbler, measuring 11.5 to 12.5 centimetres (4.5 to 4.9 in) in length and weighing 13.5 grams (0.48 oz). It has an off-white face, streaked with buffy-brown on the ear coverts, and the crown is brown with white speckles. The eye is brown, the bill is dark grey-brown, and the legs are pinkish-brown. The male has a black upper margin to the brow, whereas on the female it is reddish-brown. The plumage of the upperparts is grey-brown with darker streaks. The tail is dark-brown with a black subterminal band and white tips, and it is usually held horizontally. The underparts are yellowish-white and heavily streaked with black. The juvenile is similar to the female, but the top of its head is more diffusely spotted.

== Distribution and habitat ==
The speckled warbler is found in southeastern Australia. It is patchily distributed in Queensland, roughly southeast of a line between Mackay and Charleville, being somewhat more common towards the extreme southeast of the state. In New South Wales, it occurs throughout the New England Tablelands and the South West Slopes, extending westward to the Pilliga Scrub and to Griffith in the Riverina, and eastwards into the Hunter Valley. It is fairly common in the Australian Capital Territory. In Victoria, the speckled warbler is found within a broad strip, including the Chiltern Box-Ironbark and Warby-Ovens National Parks, the Bendigo region, the Brisbane Ranges and You Yangs, across to Balmoral on the western side of the Grampians. It is scarce to moderately common within its range. Its preferred habitat is open eucalypt woodland with rocky gullies, tussocky grass, scattered logs, and sparse shrubbery.

== Behaviour ==
The speckled warbler is quiet and well camouflaged. However, when disturbed, it will make a grating twitter and fly to a perch, then soon return to foraging on the ground. Its song is soft, mellow and musical, interspersed with sharp whistles, somewhat like that of the western gerygone (Gerygone fusca). It is also a mimic of other species. Like the redthroat (Pyrrholaemus brunneus), the speckled warbler makes a distinctive whirring sound with its wings in flight.

=== Breeding ===
The breeding season is from August to January. It builds a dome-shaped nest with a side-entrance in a slight hollow, near the base of a tree or dense shrub, or among fallen branches. The nest is loosely built of dried grass, bark-shreds and moss, often lined with feathers and fur, and resembling the surrounding debris. It lays a clutch of 3 or 4 eggs, each measuring 19 by 16 millimetres (0.75 in × 0.63 in). The eggs are a reddish-chocolate colour, darker at the large end. The female incubates the eggs for 17–20 days, and then broods the hatchlings. The nestlings are fed by her and the primary male for 15–19 days. The nests are parasitised by the fan-tailed cuckoo (Cacomantis flabelliformis) and the black-eared cuckoo (Chrysococcyx osculans).

=== Diet and foraging ===
It feeds on the ground, often in the company of other birds (mixed species flocks), such as the buff-rumped thornbill (Acanthiza reguloides), eastern yellow robin (Eopsaltria australis), white-browed scrubwren (Sericornis frontalis), spotted pardalote (Pardalotus punctatus), weebill (Smicrornis brevirostris), and silver-eye (Zosterops lateralis). It is mainly insectivorous, but occasionally eats seeds. Its chief prey are beetles (Coleoptera), wasps and winged ants (Hymenoptera), moth and butterfly larvae (Lepidoptera), mantids and grasshoppers (Orthoptera).

== Conservation status ==
Although relatively abundant with a population estimated at 400,000, the speckled warbler appears to be declining within its range. Threats include land clearance, leading to the advent of invasive weeds and increased predator pressure, as well as over-grazing and salinization with consequent fragmentation and degradation of habitat. Drought and fire also pose ongoing threats.

On the IUCN Red List, the speckled warbler was uplisted from near threatened to least concern status in 2000, having found to be more common than previously believed. In October 2016, it continued to be assessed as least concern on the IUCN Red List. Speckled warbler are not listed as threatened on the Australian Environment Protection and Biodiversity Conservation Act 1999. It is listed as "vulnerable" under the New South Wales Threatened Species Conservation Act 1995. It is listed as "threatened" on the Victorian Flora and Fauna Guarantee Act (1988). Under this Act, an Action Statement for the recovery and future management of this species has not been prepared. On the 2007 advisory list of threatened vertebrate fauna in Victoria, the speckled warbler is listed as vulnerable.

SE Queensland, Australia
