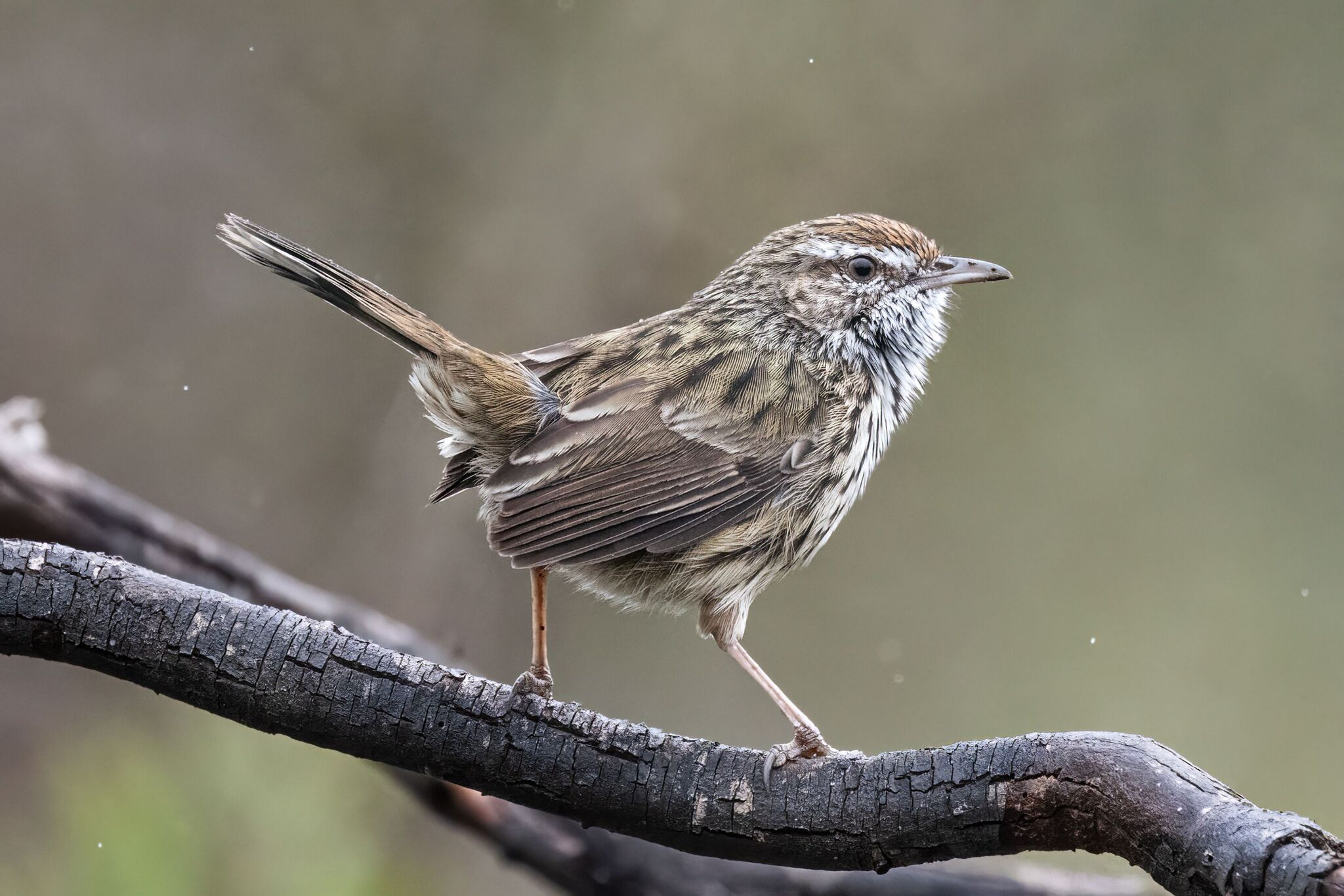

Conservation status
- Least Concern (IUCN 3.1)

Scientific classification
- Kingdom: Animalia
- Phylum: Chordata
- Class: Aves
- Order: Passeriformes
- Family: Acanthizidae
- Genus: Calamanthus
- Species: C. montanellus

Binomial name
- Calamanthus montanellus Milligan, 1903

Synonyms
- Calamanthus campestris montanellus

= Western fieldwren =

Species of bird

The western fieldwren (Calamanthus montanellus) is a species of bird in the family Acanthizidae, endemic to southwestern Australia. It is often considered a subspecies (Calamanthus campestris montanellus) of the rufous fieldwren (C. campestris), most notably by Christidis and Boles in their 2008 work, but as a separate species by many other authorities including the International Ornithological Committee.

A 2020 genetic and morphological analysis of the genus suggests that C. montanellus is a synonym of C. campestris, and that rather than consisting of seven subspecies, C. campestris comprises two mainland subspecies C. c. campestris and C. c. rubiginosus east and west, respectively, of 133 degrees longitude, and only one island subspecies, C. c. hartogi.
