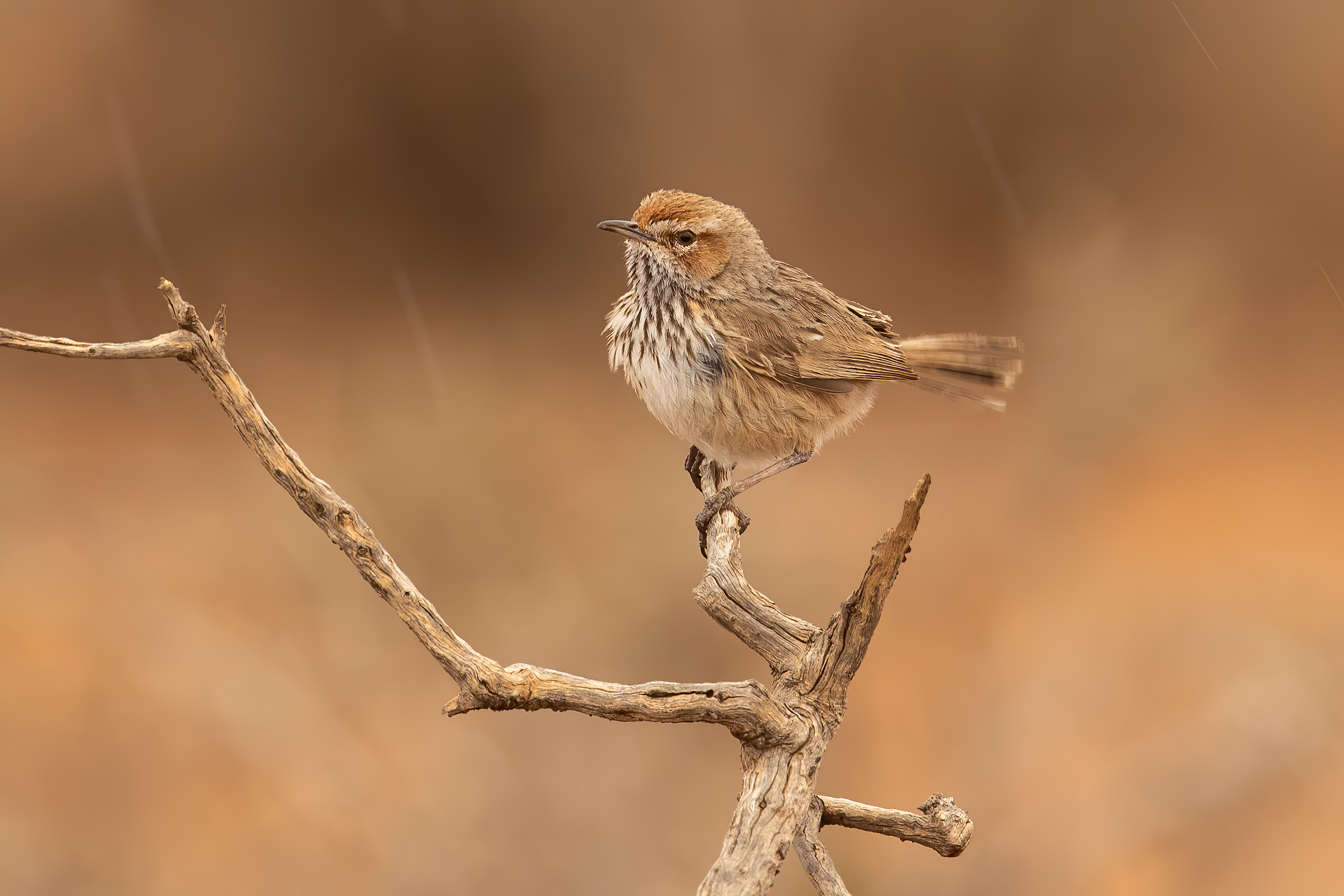

Conservation status
- Least Concern (IUCN 3.1)

Scientific classification
- Kingdom: Animalia
- Phylum: Chordata
- Class: Aves
- Order: Passeriformes
- Family: Acanthizidae
- Genus: Calamanthus
- Species: C. campestris

Binomial name
- Calamanthus campestris (Gould, 1841)

= Rufous fieldwren =

Species of bird

The rufous fieldwren (Calamanthus campestris) also known as the desert wren or sandplain wren is a species of insectivorous bird in the family Acanthizidae, endemic to Australia.

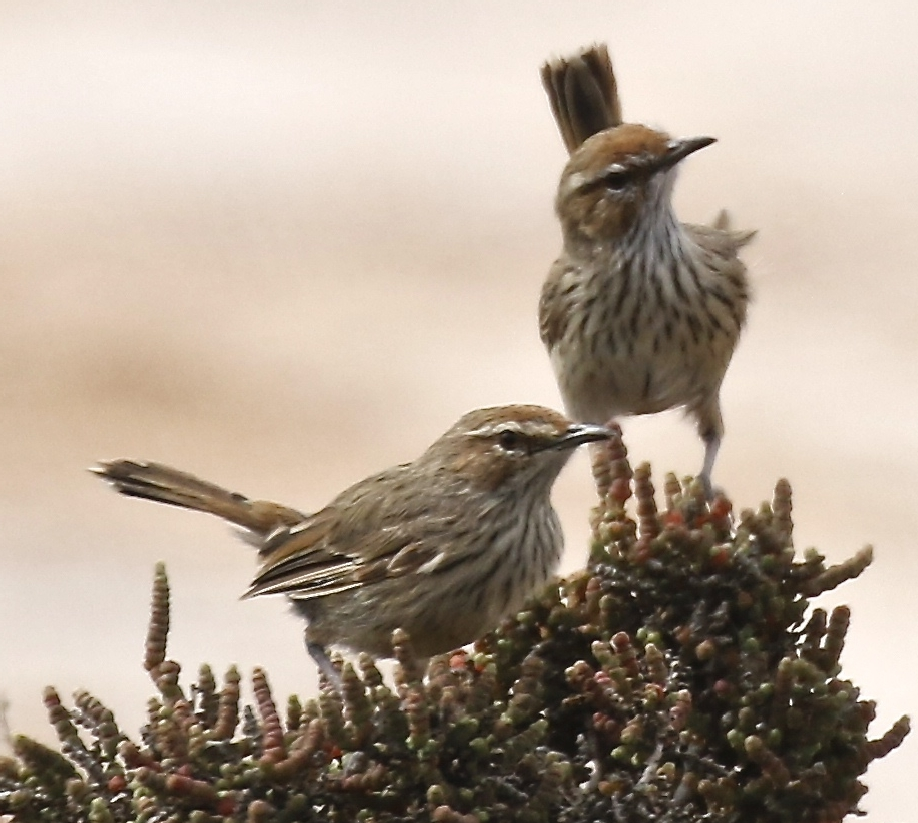
Lake Tyrrell, Victoria, Australia

== Taxonomy ==
The rufous fieldwren is one of 63 species of the Australasian warbler family Acanthizidae, which includes gerygones, scrubwrens and thornbills.

=== Subspecies ===
Calamanthus campestris includes the following subspecies:

- C. c. winiam - (Campbell, AJ. & Campbell, AG., 1927) from southeastern Australian mallee.
- C. c. campestris - (Gould, 1841) from southern South Australia and Nullarbor Plain.
- C. c. rubiginosus - (Campbell, AJ., 1899)
- C. c. dorrie - (Mathews, 1912)
- C. c. hartogi - (Carter, 1916)
- C. c. wayensis - (Mathews, 1912)
- C. c. isabellinus - (North, 1896)
- C. c. montanellus (Milligan, 1903)

There is both historical and contemporary contention to Calamanthus campestris montanellus' split from a subspecies of the rufous fieldwren to a taxonomically recognised species: the Western Fieldwren.

The 1926 Royal Australasian Ornithological Union Checklist recognised four individual fieldwren species; the striated fieldwren (fuliginosus), the rufous fieldwren(campestris), the rusty fieldwren(isabellinus) and the rock fieldwren (montanellus). This was contended at the time by Mathews (1912), whose 'official' bird reference list documented just striated and rufous fieldwrens.

The International Ornithological Committee's World Bird List v.12.1 and IUCN's Red List both list the Western Fieldwren as its own species, where as the Handbook of Australian, New Zealand and Antarctic Birds (HANZAB) supports Parker & Eckert (1983), and Christidis & Boles (1994) in only recognising C. campestris and C. fuliginosus as the two fieldwren species.

Current in print field guides highlight this division with the CSIRO The Australian Bird Guide (first printed 2018 and revised edition) only recognises the striated fieldwren and the rufous fieldwren. Whilst Pizzey & Knight's The Field Guide to the Birds of Australia (7th edition) includes the Western fieldwren: C. montanellus as the third species.

Recent (2021) genetic and morphological analysis of the genus suggests that C. montanellus is a synonym of C. campestris, and that rather than consisting of seven subspecies, C. campestris comprises two mainland subspecies C. c. campestris and C. c. rubiginosus east and west, respectively, of 133 degrees longitude, and only one island subspecies, C. c. hartogi.

== Description ==
The rufous fieldwren is a small terrestrial bird, measuring 11.5–13.5 cm (4.5–5.3 in) long, 15.5–19.5 cm (6.1–7.6 in) wingspan, 11–16 g (0.38–0.56 oz) weight.

The eight subspecies are divisible into five groups by their physical traits, characterised by the prominent colour of their mantle, back, scapulars, underbody and degree of striation throughout their plumage.

- Subspecies C.c. campestris and C.c. rubiginosus is predominantly grey backed with a slight rufous wash, a cream toned underbody with dark striations.
- Subspecies C.c. winiam features a grey back, thick streaking on the underside.
- Subspecies C.c. Isabellinus and C.c. wayenis rich rufous-brown upper parts, wish washed cinnamon underparts, has very fine, if not obsolete streaking.
- Island Subspecies C.c. Dorrie and C.c. Hartogi have pale-grey upper parts, white underneath with moderate striations.
- C.c montanellus is the darkest form, resembling closely to the striated fieldwren Olive grey above with a pale yellow underside.

Females of all subspecies are descriptively similar, only differing through a slightly duller supercilium. Sexual dimorphism is most prominent in subspecies C. montanellus with the chin, throat and supercilium being white in males and yellowish-white and duller in females.

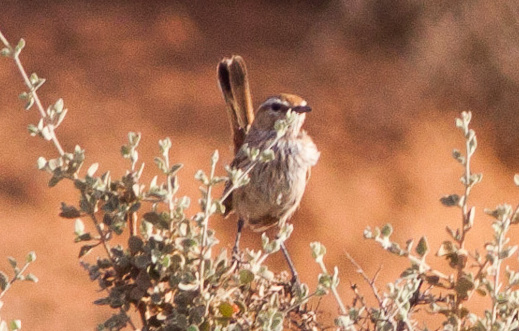
Rufous fieldwren

Both sexes are known to sing, which is a cheerful, melodious and clear whirr-whirr-chick-chick-whirr-ree-ree whistled from atop low-lying shrubs. Singing only occurs during their breeding season, which in some sub-populations can occur year-round. Their song can typically be heard at daybreak and for about 30 minutes after the sun has set. Alarm calls consist of sharp chrr-r-r and han-han-han.

Rufous fieldwrens are usually observed singly or in pairs, but can be seen in small family groups of up to five and are often mingled in interspecies flocks with similarly sized inland thornbills, shy heathwrens and slender-billed thornbills. Their tail is always strongly cocked including when hopping along the ground, though sometimes when running they will flatten their tail out horizontally.

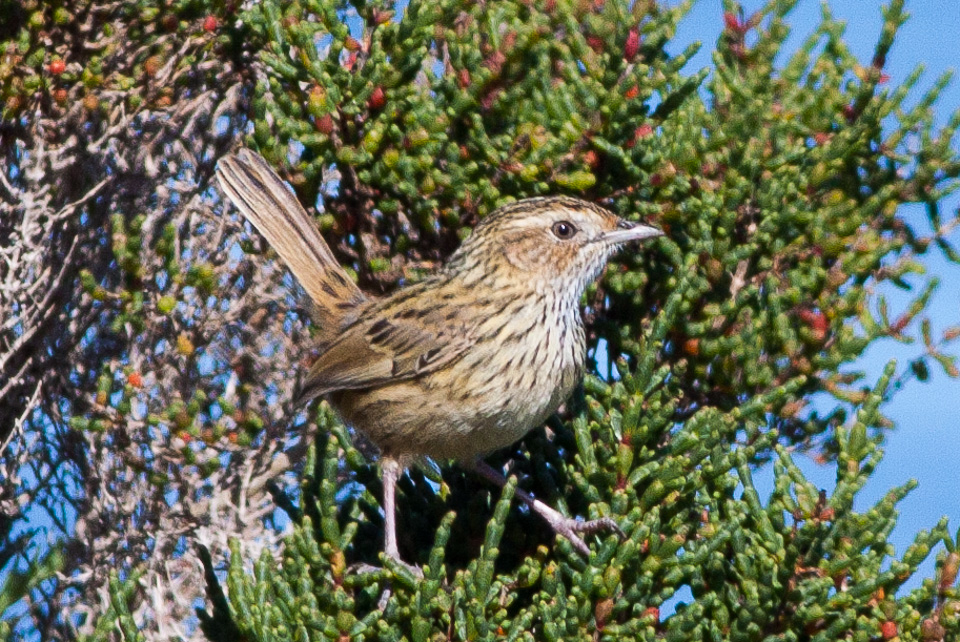
Striated fieldwren

Unlikely to be confused with similar species if clearly spotted, though the rufous fieldwren does share similar traits to the striated fieldwren. Best distinguishing features are differences in habitat, with the rufous fieldwren preferring low shrub or heathland, whereas the striated fieldwren occupies rank herbage or cutting-grass swamps, although they can overlap through coastal melaleuca heathland.

The rufous fieldwren has noticeably greyer upperparts with whiter underparts and has a distinctive longer and finer decurved bill than its striated counterpart whose bill is straighter and diagnostically wedge-shaped in profile, with much heavier streaking its through plumage than rufous fieldwrens.

== Distribution and habitat ==
=== Populations ===
Occurring in multiple sub-populations, the subspecies of the rufous fieldwren occur across the four southern states of mainland Australia.

=== Habitat ===
Due to the widespread but disjunct range of the rufous fieldwren sub-populations, there is a diverse variety of habitat that the rufous fieldwren occupies. Populations to the west prefer dry and open woodlands and coastal heaths, mainly in the temperate and sub-tropical zone of Western Australia. On the north-west Nullarbor Plain, rufous fieldwren populations occur throughout pearl bluebush shrubland, clumps of ray flower and usually throughout a diverse variety of shrubs such as mallee paperbark, mallee honey myrtle and dwarf sheoaks.

Subspecies occurring through the arid and semi-arid regions of central Australia mainly occupy chenopod shrublands and heathlands gravitating towards vegetation stands of Atriplex and Sclerolaena saltbush, Maireana bluebush and Sarcocornia samphire shrublands and heathlands.

Eastern populations occur throughout gibber plains, saline or brackish wetlands with a preference for rocky areas sparsely vegetated with spinifex groundcover and eucalypts. Rufous fieldwren are occasionally observed in the Little Desert, Victoria, amongst stunted mallee eucalypts and spinifex grasslands.

== Behaviour ==
=== Breeding ===
Breeding has been recorded from June to April with timing of egg-laying and incubation varying geographically. Subpopulations in Western Australia have been observed breeding year round. Nesting sites are scattered throughout the rufous fieldwren's entire range, though nest records are sparse, representing sites from North-West Victoria through to the west coast of Western Australia.

Nesting sites are predominately ground-based, under the canopy of shrubs or grass tussocks, though nests have been found out in the open on mounds of soil, and also above ground in the branches of low-lying vegetation; usually saltbush, bluebush, samphire or occasionally spinifex grass.

Nests are globular or domed in construction, measuring 15.2 cm (5.98 in) external length, 10.2 cm (4.01 in) external diameter, 3.8 cm (1.49 in) entrance diameter, and made largely with strips of bark, or fine dry grass. Nests are lined with softer materials such as wool, fur, feathers, plant down and insect cocoons. A nest observed from subspecies C. c. winiam was lined with the feathers of Australian magpies, brown falcons, quails and duck down.

Females sit closely and are likely to be the sole incubator, with egg incubation periods largely unknown. Clutch sizes are similar across all subspecies with 3 or 4 eggs, with occasionally only two being laid.

The smooth and glossy eggs are oval to rounded-oval in shape measuring 19–22 mm (0.74–0.86 in) in length, and 14.5–18 mm (0.57–0.7 in) diameter width. There is geographical variation in egg colouration with inland subspecies' eggs being uniformly pale chocolate coloured, grading to a darker toned cap. Subspecies closer to the coast observed to have buff salmon, chocolate-red and chestnut-brown egg colourations. Subspecies C. c. montanellus' eggs closely resemble eggs of the striated fieldwren and feature deeper-toned, flecked markings along the surface.

Both parents attend to and feed fledglings, who are dependent for up to 17 days. Nestling success is not well documented, though birds can be quick to abandon nest and young, or dismantle nests when disturbed by human observers. Rufous fieldwren's nests can be prone to brood parasitism by pallid cuckoos, black-eared cuckoos, Horsfield's and shining bronze-cuckoos.

=== Feeding ===
Little is known of the rufous fieldwren's diet and feeding behaviours outside of casual observations. They are predominate insectivores feeding largely on beetles, wasps and small grasshoppers. They will occasionally also eat small spiders, snails and seeds from Setaria viridis and Erodium cygnorum.

== Threats and human interaction ==
Degradation of habitat, largely from over-grazing of livestock, clearing land for agriculture and the invasion of weeds in Western Australia's Wheatbelt has caused steady decline and isolation in rufous fieldwren subpopulations from their former range. Rufous fieldwrens will persist and inhabit an area until the last remnant of cover remaining has been removed, with windbreaks occasionally providing suitable habitat.

Isolated population's survival is dependent on the maintenance of their current remnant habitat by selective planting to link vegetation being a viable solution, as threats of fires on the remaining habitat can lead to localised extinctions. Despite the presence of livestock, feral cats and occasional large-scale landscape fires, subspecies C. c. hartogi persists on Dirk Hartog Island.

== Conservation status ==
The International Union for Conservation of Nature's Red List of Threatened Species evaluates the rufous fieldwren as Least Concern.
