= Reef Hills State Park =

Protected area in Victoria, Australia

- IUCN category II (national park)
- Location within Victoria
- Location: Victoria
- Nearest city: Benalla
- Coordinates: 36.5945°S 145.9363°E
- Area: 20.13 km^{2} (7.77 sq mi)
- Established: 1986
- Governing body: Parks Victoria
- Website: Official website

Reef Hills State Park is a protected area of 2013 hectares, about 5 km south-west of Benalla, in the north east of Victoria, Australia. There are traces of a mining activity from the gold rush. It was established in 1986.

== Environment ==
The park is home to more than 17 mammal species and 100 bird species. It is part of the Warby-Chiltern Box-Ironbark Region Important Bird Area, identified as such by BirdLife International because of its importance for the conservation of Box-Ironbark forest ecosystems and several species of threatened woodland birds dependent on them.
