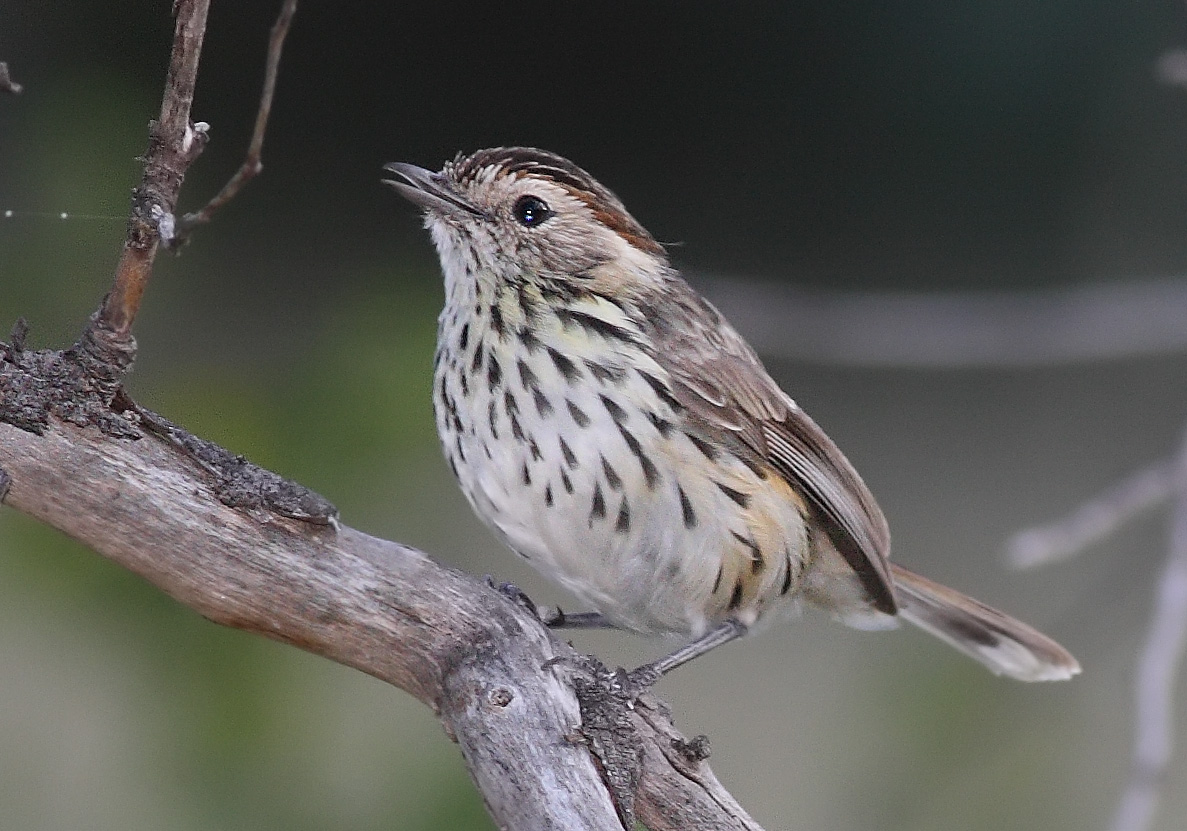
- Speckled warbler (Pyrrholaemus sagittatus)

Scientific classification
- Kingdom: Animalia
- Phylum: Chordata
- Class: Aves
- Order: Passeriformes
- Family: Acanthizidae
- Genus: Pyrrholaemus; Gould, 1841

Type species
- Pyrrholaemus brunneus Gould, 1841

= Pyrrholaemus =

Genus of birds

Pyrrholaemus is a genus of birds in the family Acanthizidae.

The genus was introduced by the English ornithologist and bird artist John Gould in 1841. The name Pyrrholaemus is from classical Greek purrhos meaning "flame-coloured" or "red" and laimos for "throat".

== Species ==
The genus contains two species:

Image	Common name	Scientific name	Distribution
	Redthroat	Pyrrholaemus brunneus	Western Australia and South Australia, Tasmania
	Speckled warbler	Pyrrholaemus sagittatus	Australia (Queensland, New South Wales).
