= Warby Range State Park =

Protected area in Victoria, Australia

- IUCN category II (national park)
- Location within Victoria
- Location: Victoria
- Nearest city: Glenrowan
- Coordinates: 36.2184°S 146.1812°E
- Area: 114.6 km^{2} (44.2 sq mi)
- Established: 1978
- Governing body: Parks Victoria
- Website: Official website

Warby Range State Park was a Victorian state park just north of Glenrowan. In 2010, the park became part of the newly declared Warby-Ovens National Park. It is 11,460 hectares (28,300 acres) in area, and named after Ben Warby, a pastoralist who settled in the area in 1844. There are two basic campgrounds, and many other sites for true bush camping.

== History ==
The 400 m rocky escarpments are believed to have been used by the Kelly gang as a lookout for robbing wagons loaded with gold, heading to Melbourne and Port Phillip Bay. In 2002, the park was expanded to include the state forest of Killawarra as part of a program of protecting Box-Ironbark forests.

== Environment ==
The park is part of the Warby-Chiltern Box-Ironbark Region Important Bird Area, identified as such by BirdLife International because of its importance for the conservation of Box-Ironbark forest ecosystems and several species of threatened woodland birds dependent on them. The ranges run north-to-south, allowing plant and animal species to migrate from the Australian Alps to the riverina plains, Murray River and arid regions.
