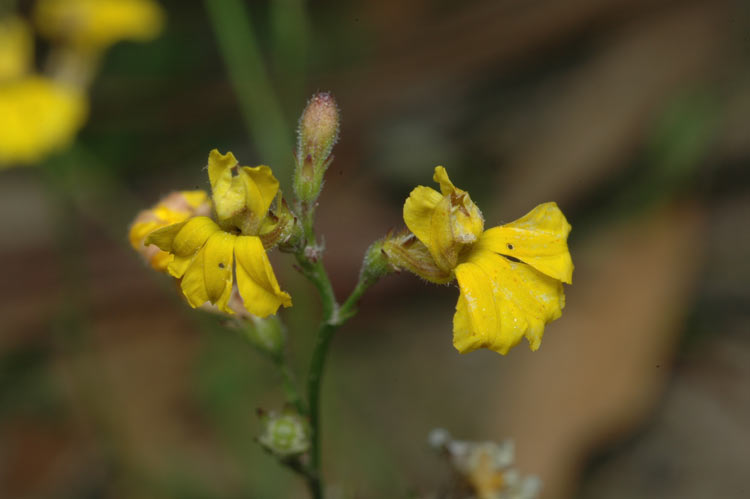
- Goodenia macbarronii in Goobang National Park

Conservation status
- Priority Three — Poorly Known Taxa (DEC)

Scientific classification
- Kingdom: Plantae
- Clade: Tracheophytes
- Clade: Angiosperms
- Clade: Eudicots
- Clade: Asterids
- Order: Asterales
- Family: Goodeniaceae
- Genus: Goodenia
- Species: G. macbarronii

Binomial name
- Goodenia macbarronii Carolin

= Goodenia macbarronii =

Narrow goodenia

Species of plant

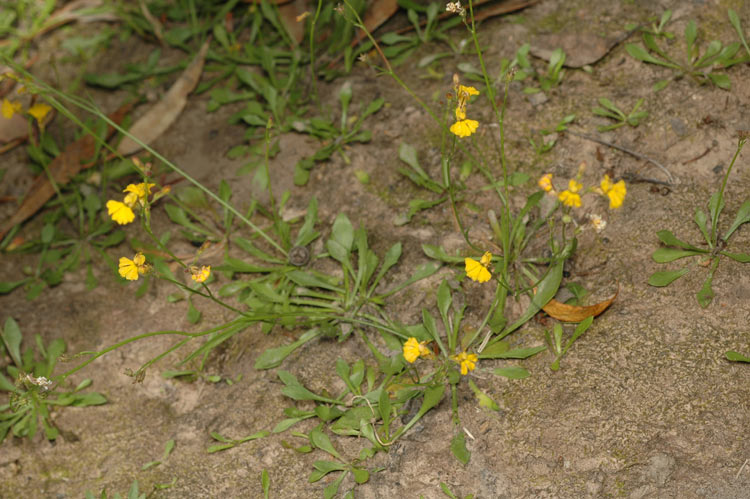
Habit

Goodenia macbarronii, commonly known as narrow goodenia, is a species of flowering plant in the family Goodeniaceae and is endemic to south-eastern Australia. It is an erect perennial herb with adventitious roots, toothed, lance-shaped leaves with the lower end towards the base, and racemes of yellow flowers.

== Description ==
Goodenia macbarronii is an erect, perennial herb that typically grows to a height of up to 30 cm (12 in) long and has adventitious roots. The leaves are thick, lance-shaped with the narrower end towards the base, 50–100 mm (2.0–3.9 in) long and 2–5 mm (0.079–0.197 in) wide, with toothed edges. The flowers are arranged in racemes up to 250 mm (9.8 in) long on a peduncle up to 20 mm (0.79 in) long, with linear bracts 2–20 mm (0.079–0.787 in) long and bracteoles 1–1.5 mm (0.039–0.059 in) long, each flower on a pedicel 0.5–3 mm (0.020–0.118 in) long. The sepals are linear to elliptic, 1–2 mm (0.039–0.079 in) long, the petals yellow 7–9 mm (0.28–0.35 in) long. The lower lobes of the corolla are 4–4.5 mm (0.16–0.18 in) long with wings about 1 mm (0.039 in) wide. Flowering mainly occurs from October to March and the fruit is an oval capsule 3–4 mm (0.12–0.16 in) long.

== Taxonomy and naming ==
Goodenia macbarronii was first formally described in 1990 Roger Charles Carolin in the journal Telopea, from specimens collected by E.J. McBarron near Holbrook in 1947. The specific epithet (macbarronii) honours the collector of the type specimens.

== Distribution and habitat ==
Narrow goodenia grows in damp places on the western slopes of the Great Dividing Range, between the Guyra and Inverell districts of New South Wales and the Wedderburn and Moyhu districts of northern Victoria.
