= Warby–Chiltern Box–Ironbark Region =

Forest habitat in Victoria, Australia

Coordinates: 36°18′40″S 146°14′01″E

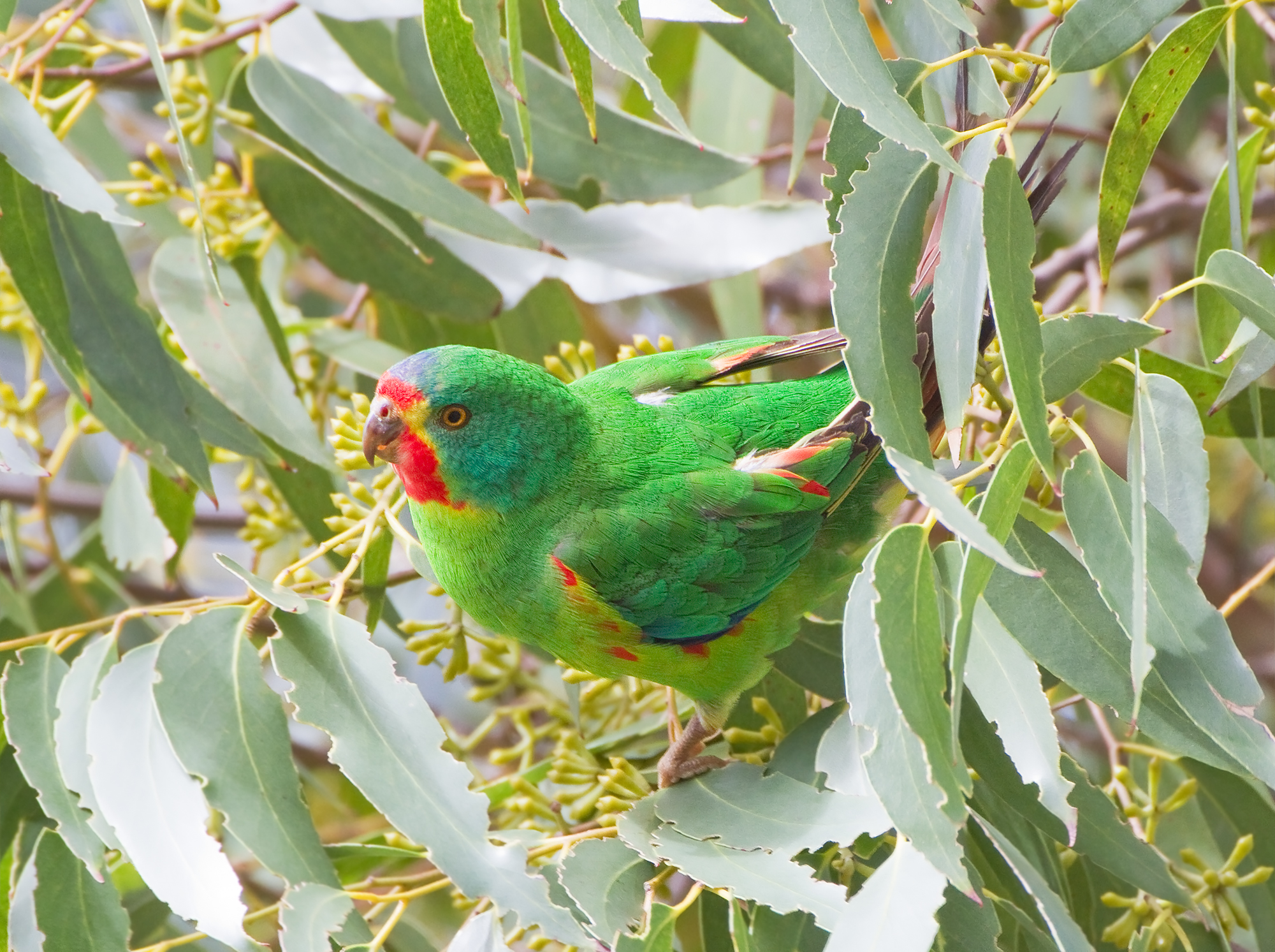
The forests provide important feeding habitat for migratory swift parrots in autumn and winter

The Warby–Chiltern Box–Ironbark Region comprises a cluster of separate blocks of remnant box-ironbark forest habitat, with a collective area of 253 km^{2}, in north eastern Victoria, south-eastern Australia.

== Description ==
This site lies to the east of the Rushworth Box-Ironbark Region IBA. It includes the Reef Hills and Warby-Ovens National Parks, Killawarra Forest, Chesney Hills, Mount Meg Reserves, Winton Wetlands Reserve, the Boweya Flora and Fauna Reserve, Rutherglen Conservation Reserve, Mount Lady Franklin Reserve and part of Chiltern-Mount Pilot National Park. Most of it lies within protected areas or state forests, encompassing only small blocks of private land.

== Birds ==
The site has been identified as an Important Bird Area (IBA) by BirdLife International because it provides feeding habitat for relatively large numbers of non-breeding swift parrots when flowering conditions are suitable, as well as the last few endangered regent honeyeaters in Victoria. It also supports small numbers of painted honeyeaters, diamond firetails and non-breeding flame robins. Declining woodland birds still present in the IBA include brown treecreepers, speckled warblers, hooded robins, grey-crowned babblers, Gilbert's whistler and, occasionally, migrant black honeyeaters. crested bellbirds are locally extinct.
