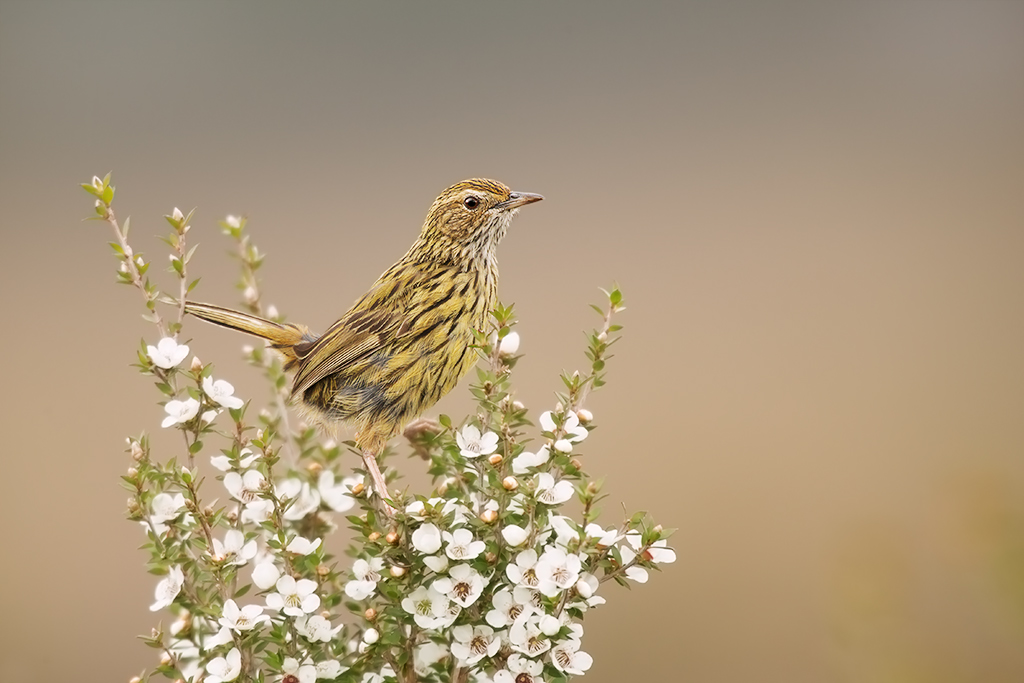
- Striated fieldwren (Calamanthus fuliginosus)

Scientific classification
- Kingdom: Animalia
- Phylum: Chordata
- Class: Aves
- Order: Passeriformes
- Family: Acanthizidae
- Genus: Calamanthus; Gould, 1838

Type species
- Praticola anthoides Swainson, 1837=Anthus fuliginosus Vigors & Horsfield, 1827

= Calamanthus =

Genus of birds

Calamanthus is a genus of bird in the family Acanthizidae, consisting of three species, all endemic to Australia. These birds are commonly known as fieldwrens.

== Taxonomy ==
The genus Calamanthus was introduced in 1838 by the English ornithologist John Gould as a replacement name for Praticola that had been introduced in 1837 by William Swainson to accommodate Praticola anthoides Swainson, a junior synonym of Anthus fuliginosus Vigors and Horsfield, the striated fieldwren. The name Praticola was pre-occupied as it had previous been introduced in 1829 by the German naturalist Johann Jakob Kaup. The genus name combines the Ancient Greek καλαμαια/kalamaia meaning "grasshopper" with the genus Anthus Bechstein, 1805.

A poorly researched genus, the alliance has been recognised as a single species treatment (Schodde, 1975) and later two species or provisionally three separate species. Birds of the World: Recommended English Names lists the following three species:

Image	Common name	Scientific name	Distribution
	rufous fieldwren	Calamanthus campestris	Australia
	striated fieldwren	Calamanthus fuliginosus	Australia
	western fieldwren	Calamanthus montanellus	Australia
