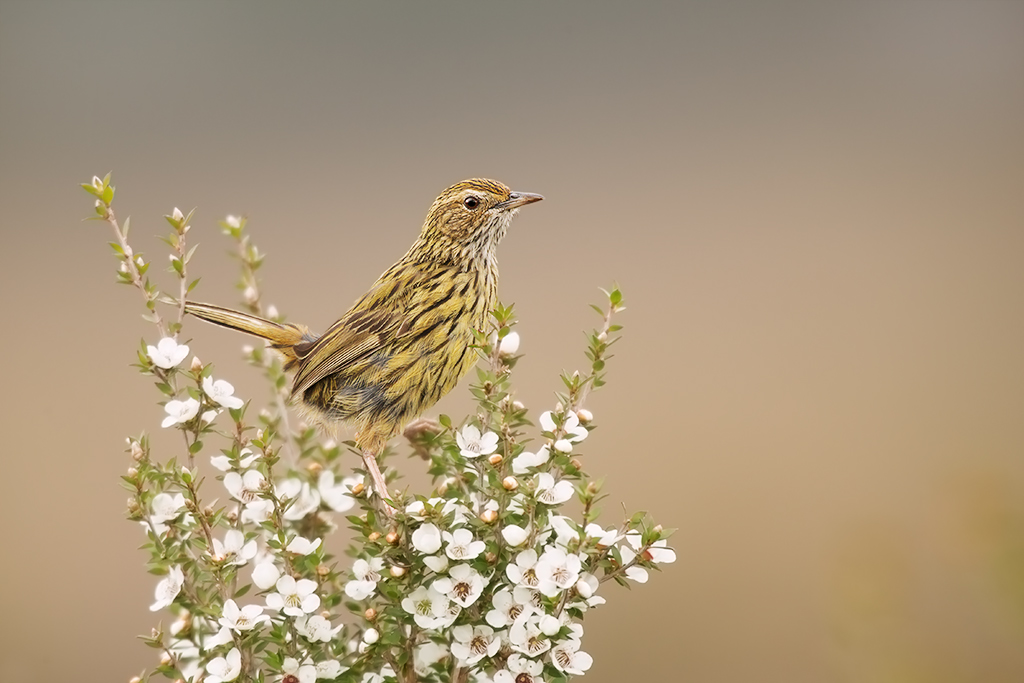
- in South West Tasmania

Conservation status
- Least Concern (IUCN 3.1)

Scientific classification
- Kingdom: Animalia
- Phylum: Chordata
- Class: Aves
- Order: Passeriformes
- Family: Acanthizidae
- Genus: Calamanthus
- Species: C. fuliginosus

Binomial name
- Calamanthus fuliginosus (Vigors & Horsfield, 1827)

Subspecies
- C. f. albiloris - North, 1902; C. f. bourneorum - Schodde & Mason, IJ, 1999; C. f. fuliginosus - (Vigors & Horsfield, 1827); C. f. diemenensis - North, 1904

= Striated fieldwren =

Species of bird

The striated fieldwren (Calamanthus fuliginosus) is a species of bird in the family Acanthizidae, endemic to Australia.

== Description ==
The striated fieldwren is a small bird, 140mm in size. It is light brown and olive-colored, with a white stomach, and black streaks all over. Its tail is cocked and whitish with black and brown streaks.

The striated fieldwren's front is buff with dark gray and brown streaks; their wings are also brown and gray but with darker and bolder streaks. The bird's flight feathers, however, do not have streaks. Instead, they have fine light gray edges. A whitish line over the eye can also be found on the striated fieldwren.

Striated fieldwrens can be difficult to spot as they forage quietly in thick vegetation or on the ground. If approached, the bird's tail will elevate and sometimes move side to side, while continuing its song until it feels trapped, then it will fly away and relocate.

== Sounds and vocal behavior ==
During the springtime, the striated fieldwren is easier to spot as they perch up in vegetation, and the male fieldwrens will sing. Striated fieldwrens have a unique sound that can be described as a song, sounding strong and whirring. Their song is generally heard from the tops of bushes causing them to be confused with other species of birds.

It is a very familiar sound to hear in the months of winter and spring; however, there is a short period of time that the "sweet little strain" is not able to be heard. The striated fieldwren songs can be heard in different variations throughout the year; however, their chirp is less heard outside of breeding season. The striated fieldwren has a loud song, that has been described as whit whit chee whit whit pee chew.

== Habitat and distribution ==
Striated fieldwrens are more easily observed in the springtime even though they can camouflage themselves in the vegetation. The small olive-brown bird inhabits locations of dense heath, grassland, and salt marsh. Striated fieldwrens are commonly found in the coastal areas of South Australia, Victoria, New South Wales and Tasmania. The striated fieldwren is now known as a vulnerable species, as their habitats have been lost to land clearance and degradation. Due to habitat intervention, their presence is commonly recorded in national parks and reserves. They have been known to locally move in New South Wales. Striated fieldwrens can be found alone, in pairs, or in family groups in the low bushes and shrubs of these areas.

== Diet and breeding ==
Their location is also important to their breeding habits. Striated fieldwrens nest in pairs and form a compact, roughly spherical nest, made up of the coarse grass, seaweed, moss, and leaves of the area.

Their nests are hidden under dense brush and grass, in areas usually vulnerable to flooding or trampling livestock. Their location is also heavily influenced by their diet. They are known to eat and forage, arthropods, and seeds known to the area. Fieldwren's eat specific arthropods including beetles of the families Chrysomelidae, Curculionidae, Dytiscidae, and more.
