= Swainsona parviflora =

Scientific classification
- Kingdom: Plantae
- Clade: Tracheophytes
- Clade: Angiosperms
- Clade: Eudicots
- Clade: Rosids
- Order: Fabales
- Family: Fabaceae
- Subfamily: Faboideae
- Genus: Swainsona
- Species: S. parviflora

Binomial name
- Swainsona parviflora Benth.

Synonyms
- Swainsona parviflora Benth. var. parviflora; Swainsonia parviflora F.Muell. orth. var.

Species of legume

Swainsona parviflora is a species of flowering plant in the family Fabaceae and is endemic to the eastern Australia. It is a low-lying perennial with imparipinnate leaves with 5 to 11 narrowly elliptic to narrowly lance-shaped or oblong leaflets, and racemes of 3 to 10 purple flowers.

== Description ==
Swainsona parviflora is a low-lying perennial plant with a few slender, hairy stems. The leaves are imparipinnate, mostly less than 50 mm (2.0 in) long with 5 to 11 narrowly elliptic to narrowly lance-shaped or oblong leaflets, the side leaflets mostly 10–25 mm (0.39–0.98 in) long and 1–2 mm (0.039–0.079 in) wide with stipules 1–2 mm (0.039–0.079 in) long at the base of the petioles. The flowers are purple, 5–8 mm (0.20–0.31 in) long, arranged in racemes of 3 to 11, 80–200 mm (3.1–7.9 in) long, on a peduncle 0.5–1.0 mm (0.020–0.039 in) long. The sepals are joined at the base to form a tube 1–2 mm (0.039–0.079 in) long, with lobes equal to or slightly longer than the tube. The standard petal is 5–9 mm (0.20–0.35 in) long and 6–11 mm (0.24–0.43 in) wide, the wings 5–8 mm (0.20–0.31 in) long and the keel 5–8 mm (0.20–0.31 in) long and 2.5–3.0 mm (0.098–0.118 in) deep.

== Taxonomy and naming ==
Swainsona parviflora was first formally described in 1864 by George Bentham in his Flora Australiensis from specimens collected near Wide Bay by John Carne Bidwill. The specific epithet (parviflora) means "small-flowered".

== Distribution ==
This species of swainsona grows in well-watered grassland on the Northern Tablelands, North West Slopes and plains of New South Wales and in south-eastern Queensland.
