= Clavy-Warby =

- Commune
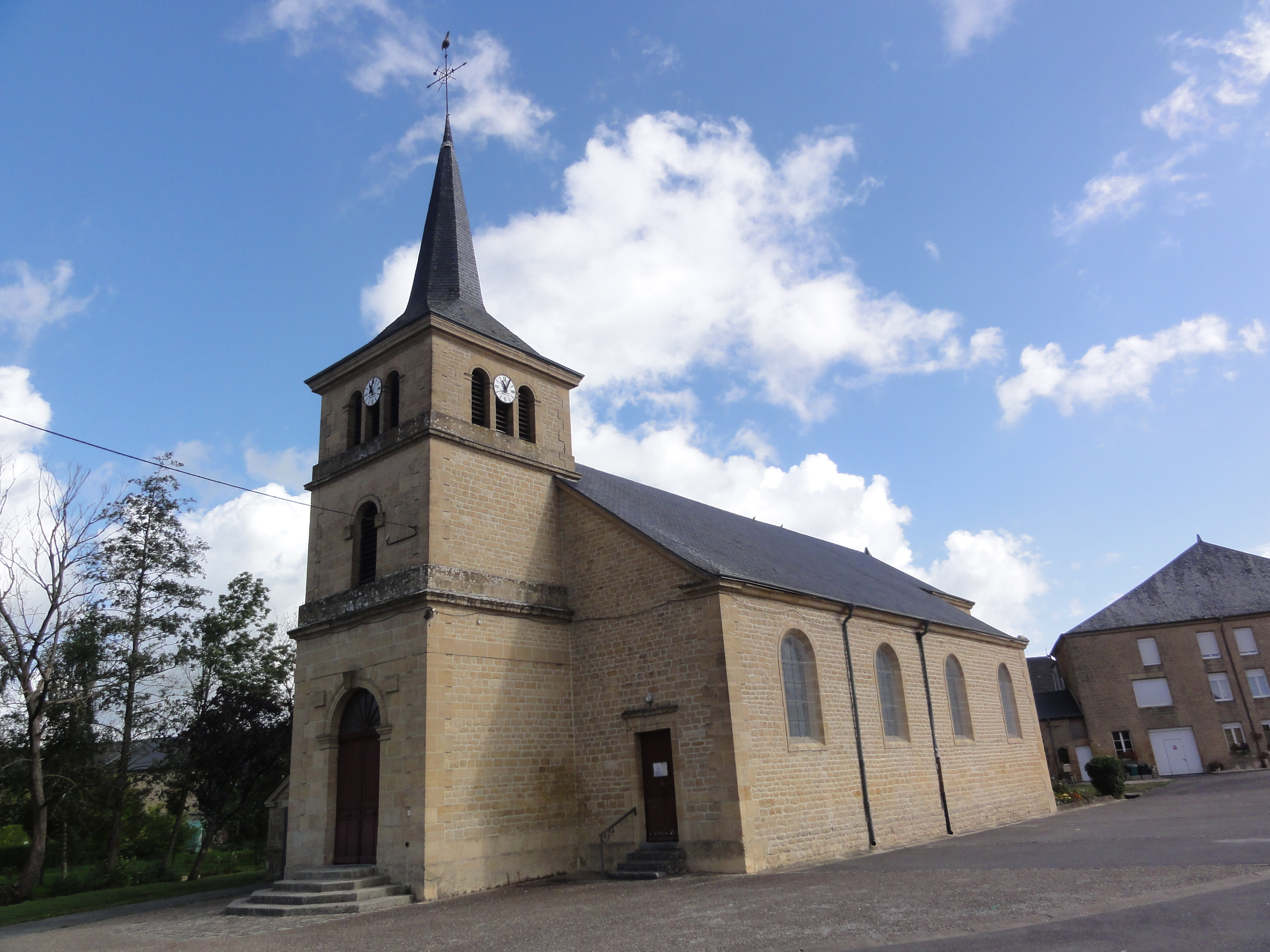
- The church in Clavy

- Coat of arms
- Location of Clavy-Warby
- Location within France Location within Grand Est
- Coordinates: 49°45′19″N 4°33′24″E
- Country: France
- Region: Grand Est
- Department: Ardennes
- Arrondissement: Charleville-Mézières
- Canton: Signy-l'Abbaye
- Intercommunality: Crêtes Préardennaises

Government
  - Mayor (2020–2026): François Justine
- Area^{1}: 11.78 km^{2} (4.55 sq mi)
- Elevation: 167 m (548 ft)
- Population (2023): 338
  - Density: 28.7/km^{2} (74.3/sq mi)
- Time zone: UTC+01:00 (CET)
  - Summer (DST): UTC+02:00 (CEST)
- INSEE/Postal code: 08124 /08460
- ^{1} French Land Register data, which excludes lakes, ponds, glaciers > 1 km^{2} (0.386 sq mi or 247 acres) and river estuaries.

Clavy-Warby is a commune in the Ardennes department in northern France.

== Population ==
Historical population
Year	Pop.	±% p.a.
1968	199	—
1975	210	+0.77%
1982	330	+6.67%
1990	328	−0.08%
1999	350	+0.72%
2007	350	+0.00%
2012	355	+0.28%
2017	348	−0.40%
2023	338	−0.48%
Source: INSEE

== See also ==
- Communes of the Ardennes department
