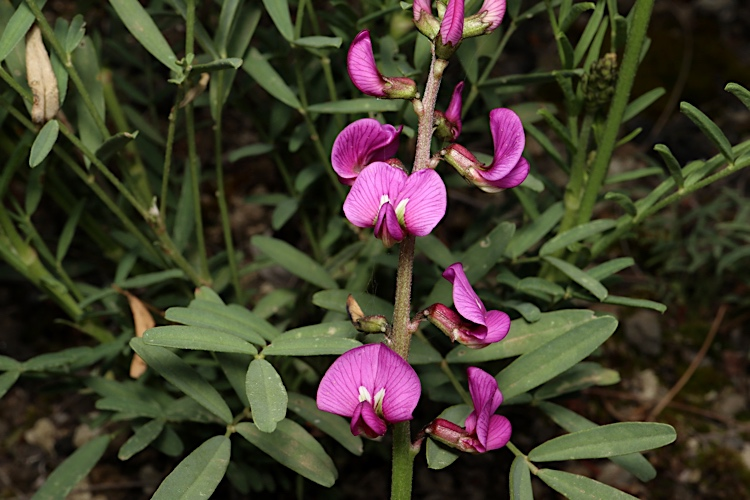
- In the Australian National Botanic Gardens

Conservation status
- Endangered (EPBC Act)

Scientific classification
- Kingdom: Plantae
- Clade: Tracheophytes
- Clade: Angiosperms
- Clade: Eudicots
- Clade: Rosids
- Order: Fabales
- Family: Fabaceae
- Subfamily: Faboideae
- Genus: Swainsona
- Species: S. recta

Binomial name
- Swainsona recta A.T.Lee

= Swainsona recta =

Species of legume

Swainsona recta, commonly known as mountain Swainson-pea or small purple pea, is a species of flowering plant in the family Fabaceae and is endemic to the south-east of continental Australia. It is an erect or ascending perennial plant with imparipinnate leaves with 5 to 13 very narrowly linear leaflets, and racemes of about 6 to more than 25 purple flowers.

== Description ==
Swainsona recta is an erect or ascending perennial plant that typically up to a height of 20 cm (7.9 in) with 1 or 2 slender, ribbed stems. Its leaves are imparipinnate, mostly 30–60 mm (1.2–2.4 in) long, with 5 to 13 very narrowly linear leaflets, the side leaflets mostly 10–20 mm (0.39–0.79 in) long and 1 mm (0.039 in) wide. There is a long, narrow stipule, between 2 and 10 mm (0.079 and 0.394 in) long at the base of the petiole. The flowers are arranged in racemes 80–250 mm (3.1–9.8 in) long with about 6 to more than 25 flowers on a peduncle 0.5–1.5 mm (0.020–0.059 in) long, each flower 5–8 mm (0.20–0.31 in) long on a densely hairy pedicel 1–2 mm (0.039–0.079 in) long. The sepals are joined at the base, forming a tube 2.0–2.5 mm (0.079–0.098 in) long, the sepal lobes usually half as long as the tube. The petals are purple, the standard petal about 7–11 mm (0.28–0.43 in) long and wide, the wings 5–9 mm (0.20–0.35 in) long, and the keel about 6–7 mm (0.24–0.28 in) long and 2.0–2.5 mm (0.079–0.098 in) deep. Flowering occurs between September and early December, and the fruit is 5–10 mm (0.20–0.39 in) long and 4–5 mm (0.16–0.20 in) wide with the remains of the style about 4 mm (0.16 in) long.

== Taxonomy and naming ==
Swainsona recta was first formally described in 1948 by Alma Theodora Lee in Contributions from the New South Wales National Herbarium, from specimens collected by Marie Henley near Wangaratta. The specific epithet (recta) means "straight".

== Distribution and habitat ==
Mountain Swainson-pea grows in grassland and open woodland, often on stony hillsides on the Central and South Western Slopes of New South Wales and in the north and north-east of Victoria.

== Conservation status ==
Swainsona recta is listed as "endangered" under the Australian Government Environment Protection and Biodiversity Conservation Act 1999, and the New South Wales Government Biodiversity Conservation Act 2016, and as "critically endangered" under the Victorian Government Flora and Fauna Guarantee Act 1988. In the past, this species was relatively widespread in north-eastern Victoria and on the slopes and tablelands of New South Wales, but is now clustered in two locations, one between Wellington and Mudgee and the other in the Canberra - Williamsdale district. Plants raised at the Australian National Botanic Gardens have been successfully translocated to a nature reserve in the south of the Australian Capital Territory. The species is part of the "Saving our Species" program, and an "action plan" has been implemented.
