= Bendigo Box-Ironbark Region =

Important Bird Area in Victoria, Australia

Coordinates: 36°47′13″S 144°16′53″E

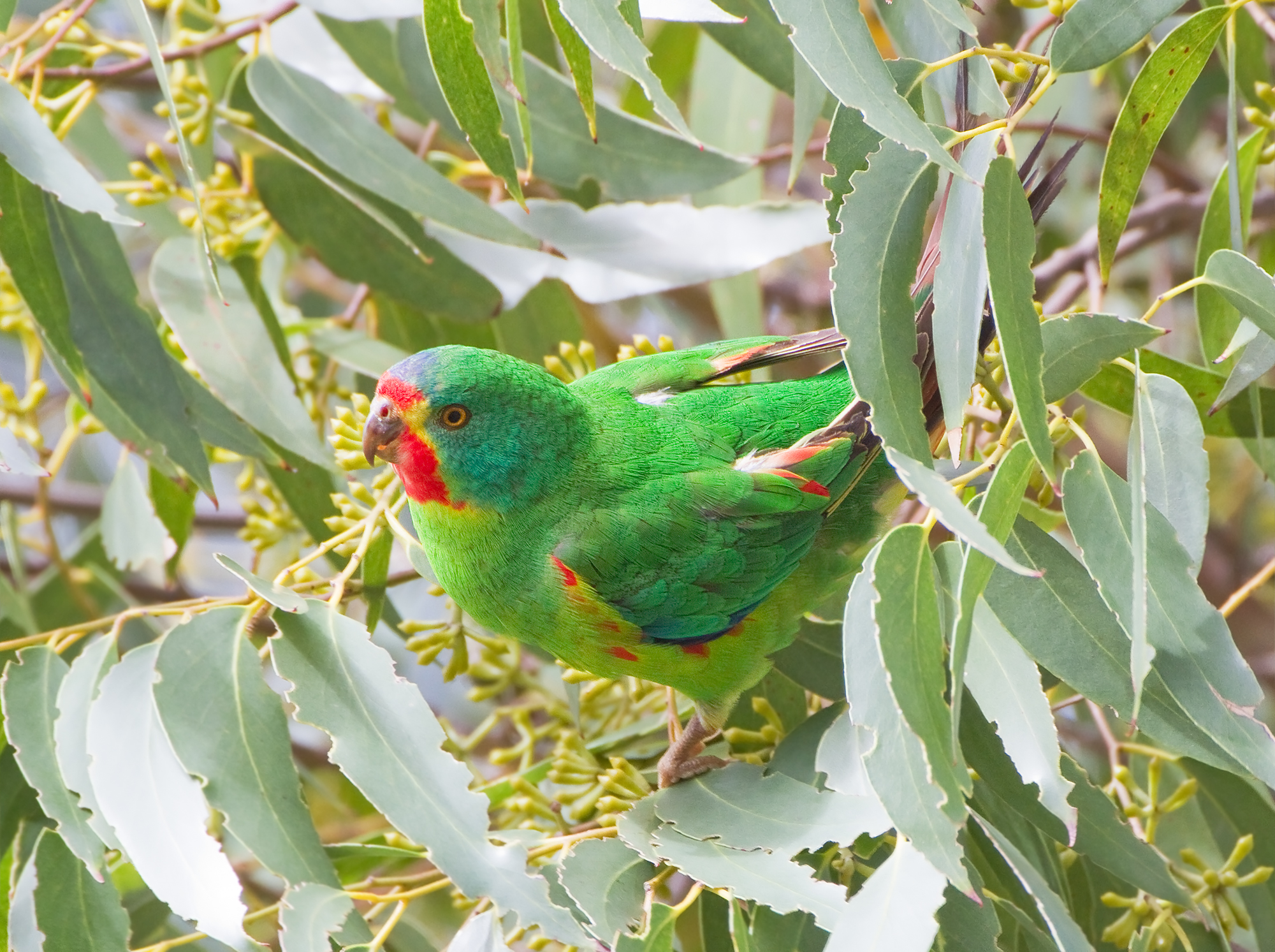
The region is important for swift parrots

The Bendigo Box-Ironbark Region is a 505 km^{2} fragmented and irregularly shaped tract of land that encompasses all the box-ironbark forest and woodland remnants used as winter feeding habitat by swift parrots in the Bendigo-Maldon region of central Victoria, south-eastern Australia.

== Description ==
The site lies between the Maryborough-Dunolly Box-Ironbark Region and Rushworth Box-Ironbark Region Important Bird Area (IBAs). It includes much of the Greater Bendigo National Park, several nature reserves and state forests, with a few small blocks of private land. It excludes other areas of woodland that are less suitable for the parrots.

== Birds ==
The region was identified as an IBA because, when flowering conditions are suitable it supports up to 1,100 non-breeding swift parrots. It is also home to small populations of diamond firetails and non-breeding flame robins. Other declining woodland birds recorded from the IBA include brown treecreepers, speckled warblers, grey-crowned babblers, Gilbert's whistlers, hooded and pink robins, crested bellbirds, and black honeyeaters.
