= Kara Kara National Park =

National park in Victoria, Australia

- IUCN category II (national park)
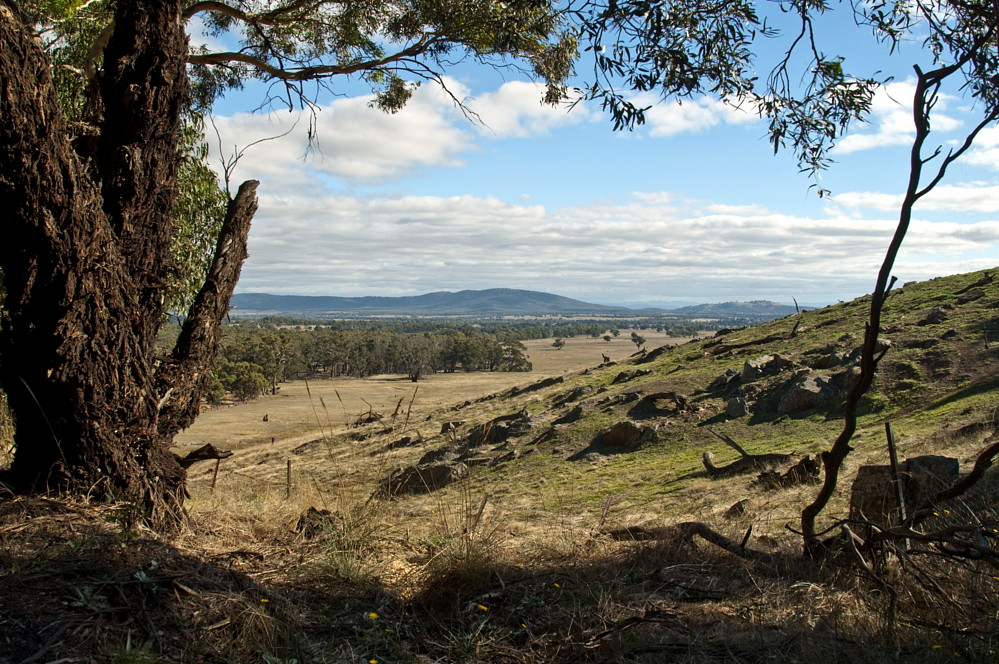
- The view looking south from the St Arnaud Range, within the Kara Kara National Park

- Location within Victoria
- Location: Victoria
- Nearest city: St Arnaud
- Coordinates: 36°51′38″S 143°17′07″E
- Area: 139.9 km^{2} (54.0 sq mi)
- Established: 30 October 2002
- Governing body: Parks Victoria
- Website: Official website

The Kara Kara National Park is a national park located in the Wimmera/Goldfields region of Victoria, Australia. The 13,990-hectare (34,600-acre) national park is situated approximately 190 kilometres (120 mi) north-west of Melbourne, west of the Sunraysia Highway, and to the south of the town of St Arnaud.

== Features ==
Kara Kara National Park protects one of the most intact remnants of Victoria's box-ironbark forests. Parts of the national park are relatively unmodified in comparison to other areas of forest in the central goldfields and are a fine example of the type of vegetation that once covered almost 13% of Victoria. The national park is of importance to the Dja Dja Wurrung people.

Most of the national park lies within the Northern Grampians Shire and the southern part of the national park is within the Pyrenees Shire. The national park was proclaimed on 30 October 2002 as the St Arnaud Range National Park which included the former Kara Kara State Park and most of the St Arnaud Range State Forest. Following release of a draft park management plan in April 2009 and subsequent consultations in accordance with the Geographic Places Names Act, 1998 (Vic) and Guidelines for Geographic Names (2010), the national park was renamed as the Kara Kara National Park.

The national park lies within the St Arnaud Box-Ironbark Region Important Bird Area, identified as such by BirdLife International because of its importance for swift parrots and other woodland birds.

The national park has numerous tracks of varying grades and quality for mountain biking and hiking with easy access off Sunraysia Highway between Redbank and St Arnaud.

== See also ==
- Protected areas of Victoria
- List of reduplicated Australian place names
- Parks Victoria
- List of national parks of Australia
