= Box–ironbark forest =

South-Eastern Woodland Ecosystem

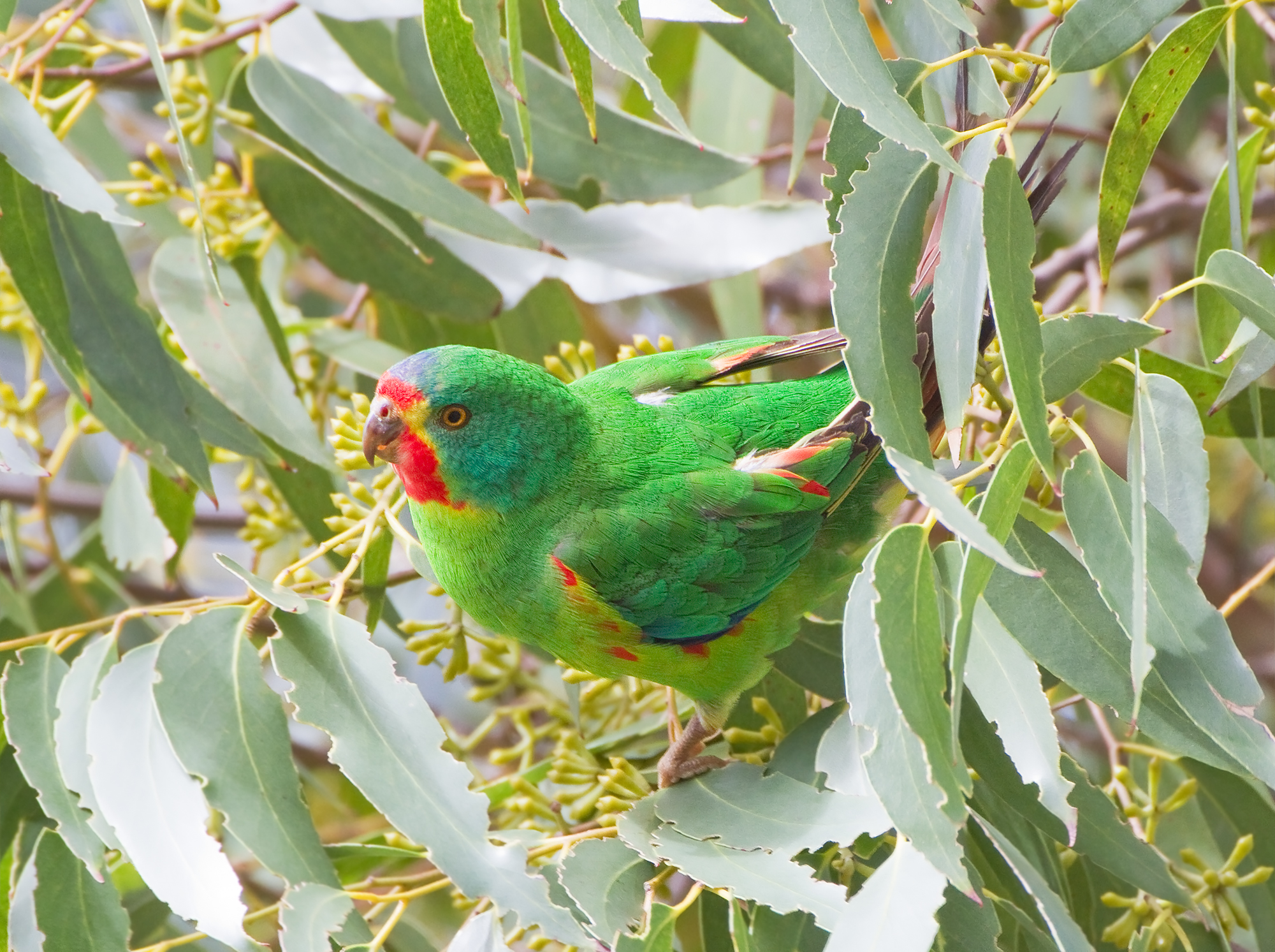
The forests provide important feeding habitat for migratory swift parrots in autumn and winter

Box–ironbark forest is a forest or woodland ecosystem that is largely limited to central Victoria in south-eastern Australia. Because its component tree species produce abundant nectar and pollen throughout the year, it is important for the conservation of many species of birds and other animals.

== History ==
Because box–ironbark forest lies mainly within the Goldfields region of Victoria, during the main years of the gold rush (1851-1870) it underwent intensive digging and clearing in the goldfields, accompanied by extensive timber cutting for infrastructure and firewood in surrounding areas. After the gold rush subsided the forests were still heavily cut for firewood and cleared for pasture.

== Description ==
The extent of Box-Ironbark Forest in 2001 (source: Environment Conservation Council)

Box–ironbark forest is found on rocky, often auriferous (gold-bearing), soils, in flat and undulating landscapes at altitudes of 150–600 m above sea level, and with an average annual rainfall of 500–800 mm. About 40% of the area formerly supporting the ecosystem in Victoria is public land with less than 20% protected in conservation reserves. About 55% has been permanently cleared for agriculture, mining and urban development. Remaining forest has been fragmented.

=== Vegetation ===
Box–ironbark forest is characterised by a canopy of box, ironbark and gum-barked eucalypts, growing to 25 m in height, over a sparse understorey of wattles, small-leaved and prostrate shrubs, herbs and grasses. The main trees are white box, red box, red ironbark, mugga ironbark, yellow gum and red stringybark. In some areas they may grow with, or be replaced by, yellow box, long-leaf box or silver bundy. The mix of plants in the groundcover includes the largest concentrations of orchids of any Victorian ecosystem. Small herbs and shrubs most abundant in, or largely restricted to, box–ironbark forests include Cheiranthera cyanaea, Philotheca verrucosa, Xerochrysum viscosum, Pultenaea largiflorens, Acacia williamsonii and Stuartina muelleri.

=== Animals ===
Because the trees of the box–ironbark forest are such prolific flowerers and nectar producers, they are a major source of nectar and pollen for honeyeaters, lorikeets and many kinds of invertebrates. Flowering of the different species of eucalypts takes place at different times of year so there is always a nectar or pollen source available for migratory, nomadic and resident birds. Consequently, there are both more species, and greater numbers of individuals, of honeyeaters and lorikeets than in any other ecosystem. Nectar and pollen feeding birds such as the black-chinned, regent, fuscous and brown-headed honeyeaters, Swift parrots and musk lorikeets are all more abundant in box–ironbark forests than elsewhere. The ecosystem supports the largest numbers of eastern grey kangaroos in Victoria and is a stronghold for brush-tailed phascogales, yellow-footed antechinuses and squirrel gliders.

== See also ==
- Bendigo Box-Ironbark Region
- Maryborough-Dunolly Box-Ironbark Region
- Rushworth Box-Ironbark Region
- St Arnaud Box-Ironbark Region
- Warby-Chiltern Box-Ironbark Region
