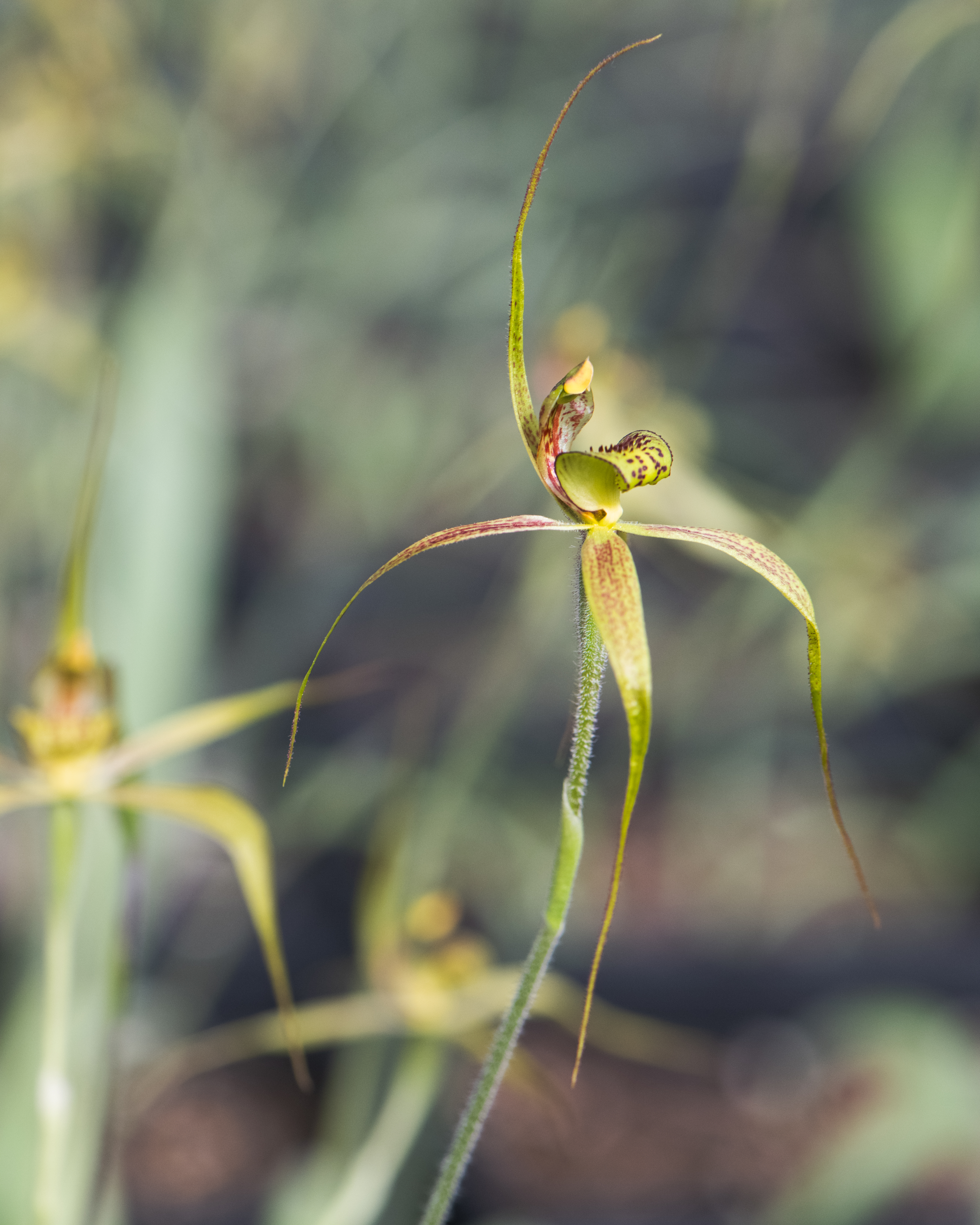
- In Royal Botanic Gardens, Cranbourne

Conservation status
- Endangered (EPBC Act)

Scientific classification
- Kingdom: Plantae
- Clade: Tracheophytes
- Clade: Angiosperms
- Clade: Monocots
- Order: Asparagales
- Family: Orchidaceae
- Subfamily: Orchidoideae
- Tribe: Diurideae
- Genus: Caladenia
- Species: C. audasii

Binomial name
- Caladenia audasii R.S.Rogers

Synonyms
- Arachnorchis audasii (R.S.Rogers) D.L.Jones & M.A.Clem.; Calonema audasii (R.S.Rogers) Szlach. nom. illeg.; Calonemorchis audasii (R.S.Rogers) Szlach.; Caladenia patersonii auct. non R.Br.: Weber, J.Z. & Bates, R. in Jessop, J.P. & Toelken, H.R. (ed.)

= Caladenia audasii =

Species of orchid

Caladenia audasii is a plant in the orchid family Orchidaceae and is endemic to Victoria. It is a rare ground orchid with a single hairy leaf and a single yellow flower.

== Description ==
Caladenia audasii is a terrestrial, perennial, deciduous, herb with an underground tuber and a single hairy leaf, 5–10 cm (2–4 in) long and 6–10 mm (0.2–0.4 in) wide.

A single yellow flower 9 cm (4 in) in diameter is borne on a spike 11–19 cm (4–7 in) high. The petals and sepals are 3–6 cm (1–2 in) long and spreading, the petals somewhat shorter than the sepals. The petals and lateral sepals are 4–5 mm (0.16–0.20 in) wide and taper to a thread-like end covered with glandular hairs. The labellum is curved with the tip rolled under and has erect lateral lobes. It is about 18 mm (0.7 in) long and 10 mm (0.4 in) wide when flattened. The edges of the labellum are scalloped and the middle lobe has short, broad teeth. There are six rows of stalkless calli along the centre of the labellum. Flowering occurs from September to November.

== Taxonomy and naming ==
The species was first formally described by Richard Rogers in 1927 and the description was published in Transactions and Proceedings of the Royal Society of South Australia. The type specimen was collected on Mount McIvor near Bendigo. The specific epithet (audasii) honours James Wales Clarendon Audas, a member of staff at the National Herbarium of Victoria.

== Distribution and habitat ==
Only five plants of this orchid species were known in 2000, growing in grassy Box–ironbark forest in three disjunct populations near Bendigo, Kingower and Deep Lead north-west of Stawell. It is extinct in South Australia. In June 2015, thirty new plants were introduced into the Greater Bendigo National Park.

== Conservation ==
This species is classified as "Endangered" under the Commonwealth Government Environment Protection and Biodiversity Conservation Act 1999 (EPBC) Act.
