= St Arnaud Box-Ironbark Region =

Australian habitat

Coordinates: 36°51′31″S 143°07′54″E

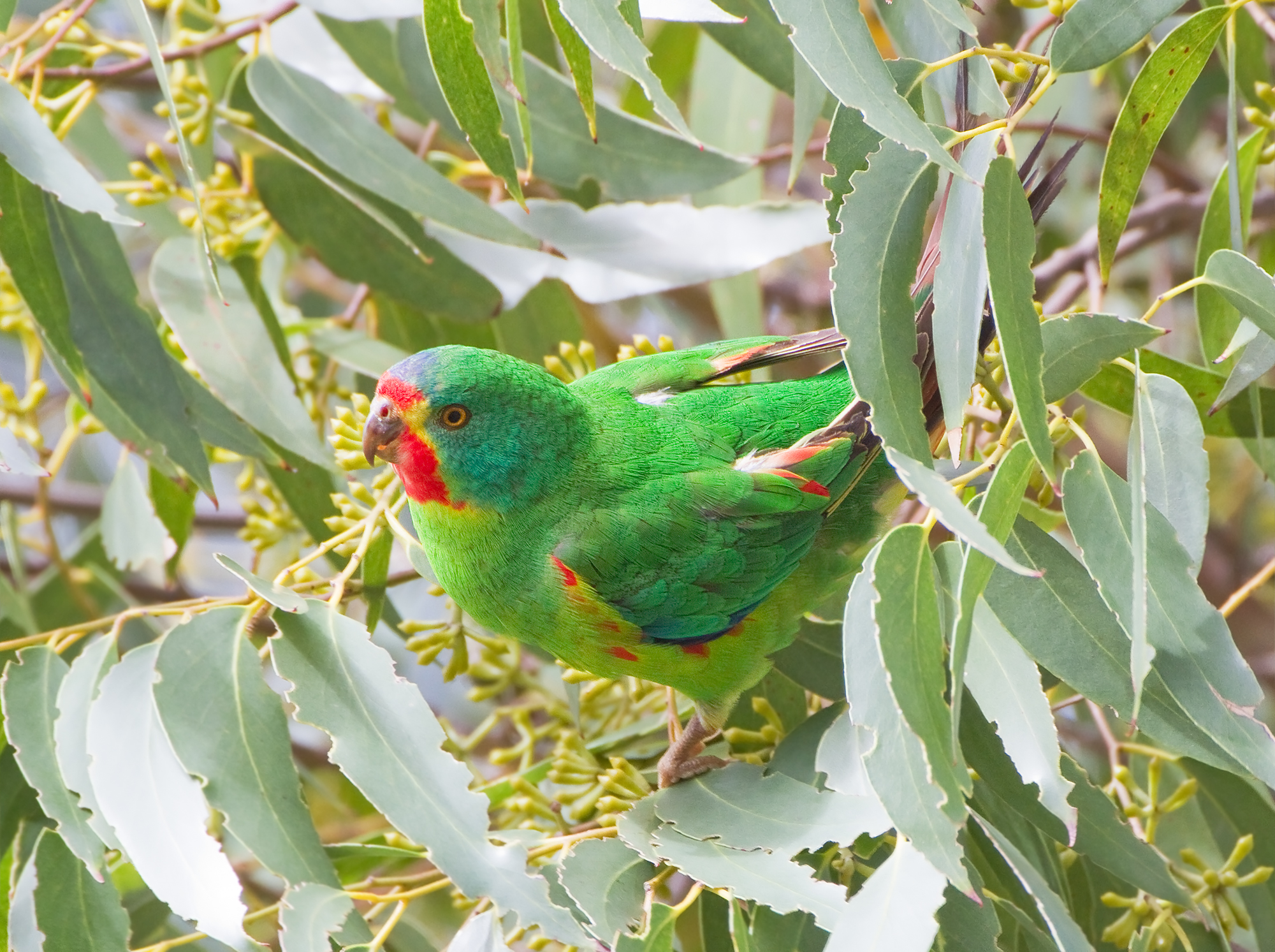
The region is important for swift parrots

The St Arnaud Box-Ironbark Region is a 481 km^{2} (186 sq mi) fragmented and irregularly shaped tract of land that encompasses all the box-ironbark forest and woodland remnants used as winter feeding habitat by swift parrots in the St Arnaud-Stawell region of central Victoria, south-eastern Australia.

== Description ==
The site lies west of the Maryborough-Dunolly Box-Ironbark Region Important Bird Area (IBA). It includes the St Arnaud Range National Park, several nature reserves and state forests, with a few small blocks of private land. It excludes other areas of woodland that are less suitable for the parrots.

== Birds ==
The region was identified as an Important Bird Area (IBA) because, when flowering conditions are suitable it supports up to about 75 non-breeding swift parrots. It is also home to small populations of diamond firetails and non-breeding flame robins. Other declining woodland birds recorded from the IBA include brown treecreepers, speckled warblers, hooded and pink robins, crested bellbirds and black honeyeaters.
