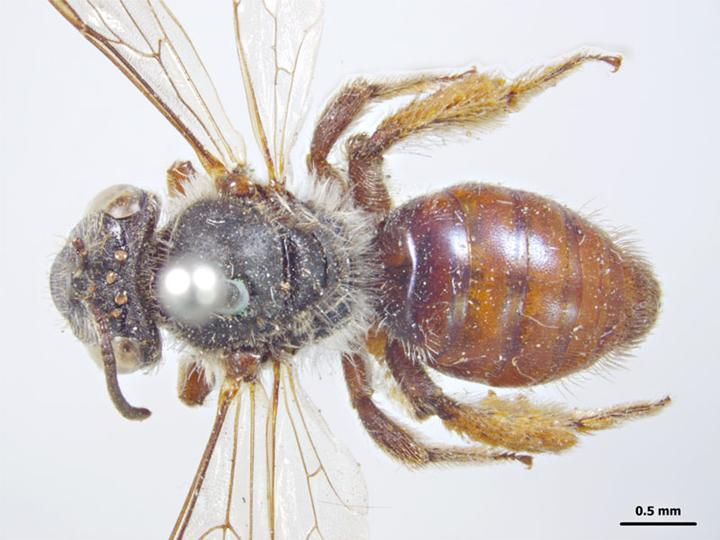
- Female

Scientific classification
- Kingdom: Animalia
- Phylum: Arthropoda
- Clade: Pancrustacea
- Class: Insecta
- Order: Hymenoptera
- Family: Colletidae
- Genus: Leioproctus
- Species: L. platycephalus

Binomial name
- Leioproctus platycephalus (Cockerell, 1912)

Synonyms
- Paracolletes platycephalus Cockerell, 1912; Paracolletes truncatulus Cockerell, 1913; Dasycolletes rufoaeneus Friese, 1924; Paracolletes nigropurpureus Rayment, 1935

= Leioproctus platycephalus =

Species of bee

Leioproctus platycephalus, or Leioproctus (Leioproctus) platycephalus, is a species of bee in the family Colletidae and subfamily Colletinae. It is endemic to Australia. It was described by British-American entomologist Theodore Dru Alison Cockerell in 1912.

== Description ==
Female body length is about 10 mm. Colouration is mainly black, with a ferruginous-red abdomen.

== Distribution and habitat ==
The species occurs in south-eastern Australia. Type localities include Heathmont and Adelaide.

== Behaviour ==
The adults are flying mellivores. Flowering plants visited by the bees include Davievsia mimosoides and Pultenaea largiflorens, as well as Scleria, Leucopogon, Dillwynia and Eutaxia species.

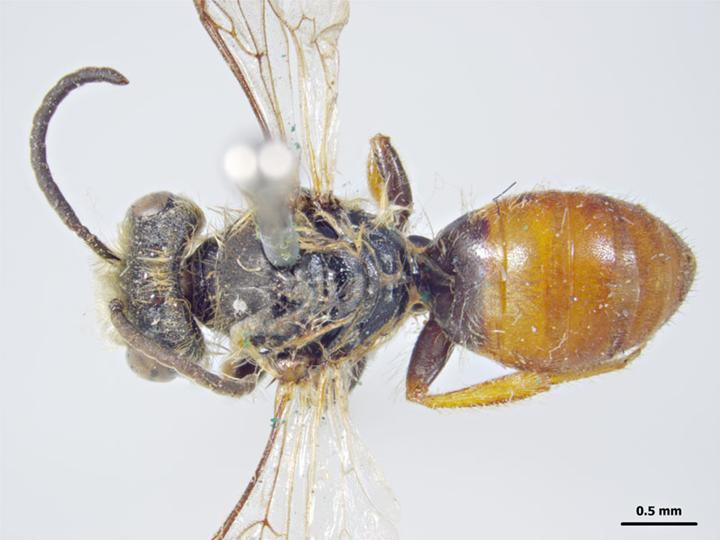
Male
