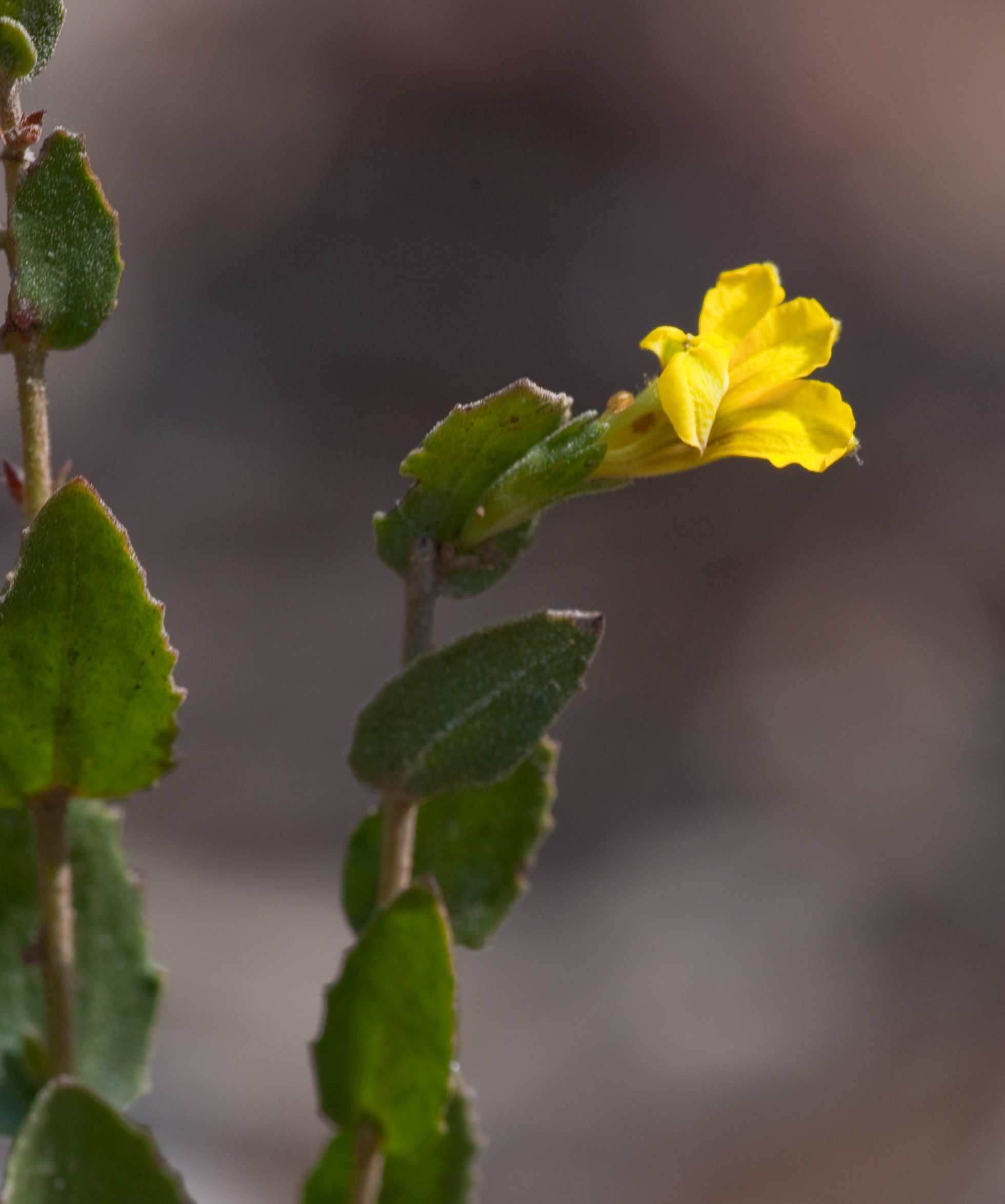
- Goodenia benthamiana in Greater Bendigo National Park

Scientific classification
- Kingdom: Plantae
- Clade: Tracheophytes
- Clade: Angiosperms
- Clade: Eudicots
- Clade: Asterids
- Order: Asterales
- Family: Goodeniaceae
- Genus: Goodenia
- Species: G. benthamiana

Binomial name
- Goodenia benthamiana Carolin

Synonyms
- Goodenia amplexans var. parvifolia Benth.; Goodenia amplexans auct. non F.Muell.: Willis, J.H. (1973)

= Goodenia benthamiana =

Small-leaf goodenia

Species of plant

Goodenia benthamiana, commonly known as small-leaf goodenia, is a species of flowering plant in the family Goodeniaceae and is endemic to south-eastern Australia. It is an aromatic undershrub with stem-clasping, egg-shaped to elliptic leaves with toothed edges, and yellow flowers arranged singly or in groups of up to three in leaf axils, with leaf-like bracteoles at the base.

== Description ==
Goodenia benthamiana is an erect, aromatic undershrub that typically grows to a height of 40 cm (16 in). The leaves are sessile, stem clasping, 10–30 mm (0.39–1.18 in) long and 4–20 mm (0.16–0.79 in) wide with toothed edges. The flowers are arranged singly or in groups of up to three in leaf axils on a peduncle 0.5–1 mm (0.020–0.039 in) long, the individual flowers on a pedicel 0.5–3 mm (0.020–0.118 in) long. There are egg-shaped to lance-shaped bracteoles 2–4 mm (0.079–0.157 in) long at the base of the flowers. The sepals are egg-shaped to lance-shaped, 2–3 mm (0.079–0.118 in) long and the petals are yellow and 10–12 mm (0.39–0.47 in) long. The lower lobes of the corolla are about 4 mm (0.16 in) long with wings about 1.5 mm (0.059 in) wide. Flowering mainly occurs from September to January and the fruit is an oval capsule about 5 mm (0.20 in) long.

== Taxonomy and naming ==
Small-leaf goodenia was first formally described in 1868 by George Bentham as Goodenia amplexans var. parvifolia in Flora Australiensis from specimens collected by John Dallachy on Mount Arapiles. In 1992, Roger Charles Carolin raised the variety to species status as G. benthamiana in Flora of Australia. The specific epithet (benthamiana) honours George Bentham.

== Distribution and habitat ==
Goodenia benthamiana grows in forest, woodland and mallee scrubland in scattered areas of western Victoria and on the Eyre Peninsula in South Australia.
