= Rushworth Box-Ironbark Region =

Tract of forested land in Victoria, Australia

Coordinates: 36°44′57″S 144°54′22″E

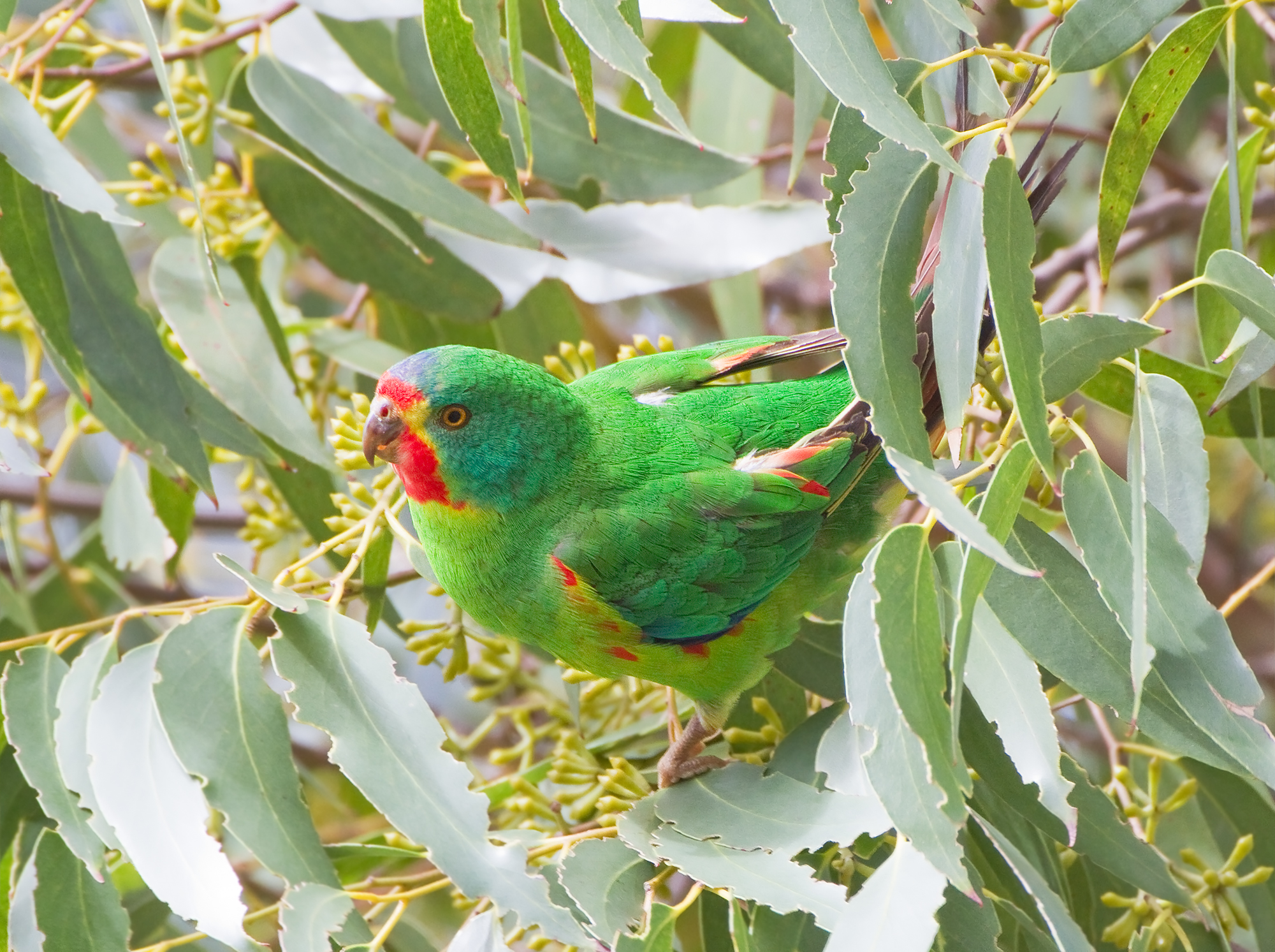
The region is important for swift parrots

The Rushworth Box-Ironbark Region is a 510 km^{2} fragmented and irregularly shaped tract of land that encompasses all the box–ironbark forest and woodland remnants used as winter feeding habitat by endangered swift parrots in the Rushworth-Heathcote region of central Victoria, south-eastern Australia. It lies north of, and partly adjacent to, the Puckapunyal Important Bird Area (IBA).

The site was identified by BirdLife International as an IBA and includes the Heathcote-Graytown National Park, several nature reserves and state forests, with a few small blocks of private land. It excludes other areas of woodland that are less suitable for the parrots.

== Birds ==
The region was identified as an IBA because, when the flowering conditions are suitable it supports up to about 70 non-breeding swift parrots. It is also home to small populations of diamond firetails and non-breeding flame robins.

Other woodland birds recorded from the IBA include brown treecreepers, speckled warblers, hooded robins, grey-crowned babblers, crested bellbirds and Gilbert's whistlers, with bush stone-curlews, migrant black honeyeaters and pink robins seen occasionally.
