= Hastings-Macleay Important Bird Area =

Important Bird Area in New South Wales, Australia

Coordinates: 31°13′05″S 152°54′28″E

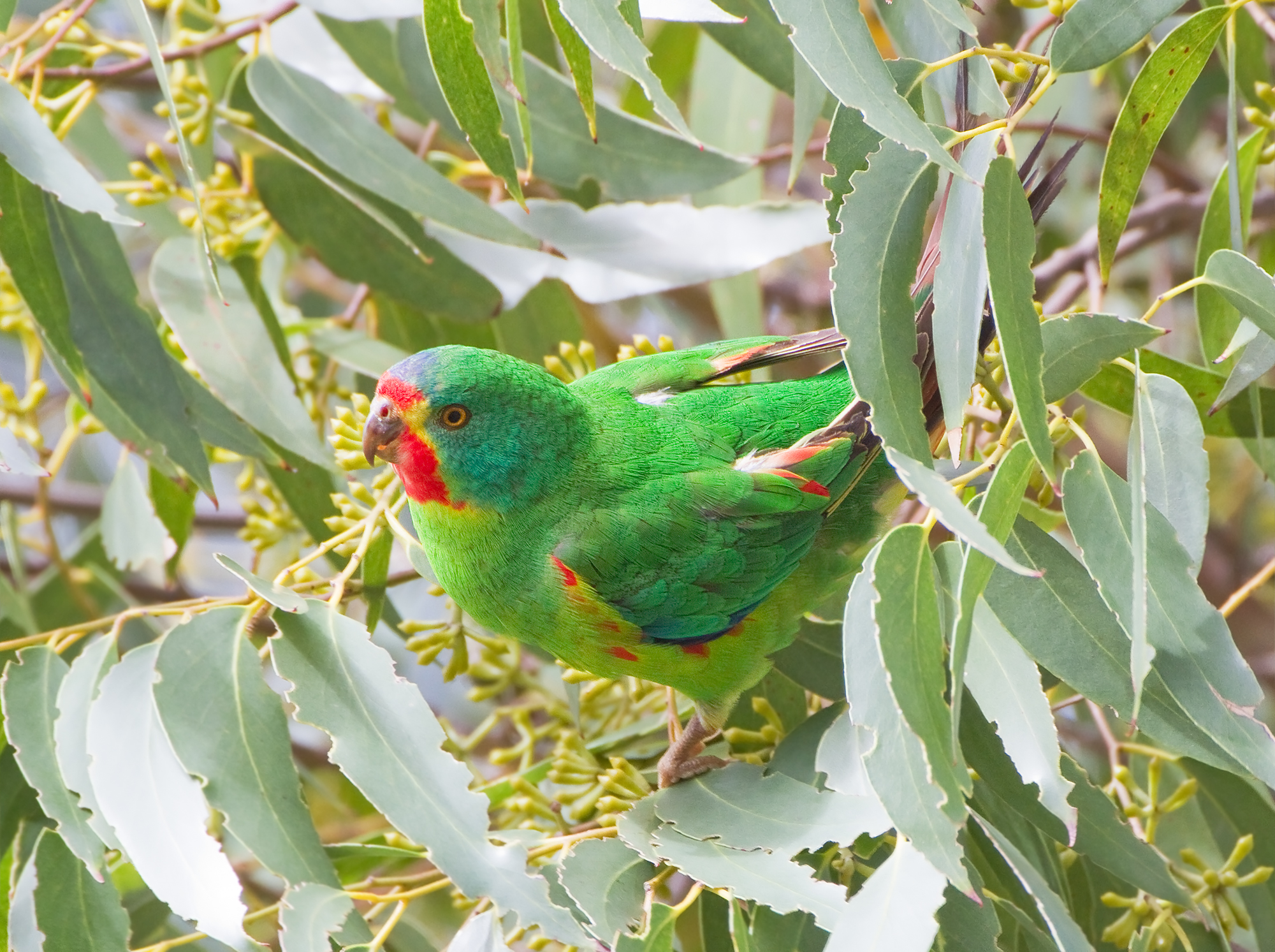
The IBA is an important site for swift parrots

The Hastings-Macleay Important Bird Area is a 1148 km^{2} tract of land stretching for 100 km along the Mid North Coast of New South Wales, Australia, from Stuarts Point in the north to the Camden Haven River in the south. It is bounded on the west by the Pacific Highway. It combines ephemeral wetlands with coastal swamp forests. It is mostly cattle-grazed but contains large blocks of state forest, protected areas and tea-tree plantations. For specific information on Birds of the Macleay Valley Region visit SWR / Macleay Birds Group

== Birds ==
The land was identified by BirdLife International as an IBA because it regularly supports significant numbers of the endangered swift parrot, regent honeyeater and Australasian bittern, and probably over 1% of the world population of sharp-tailed sandpipers.
