= Maryborough-Dunolly Box-Ironbark Region =

Coordinates: 36°49′44″S 143°41′25″E

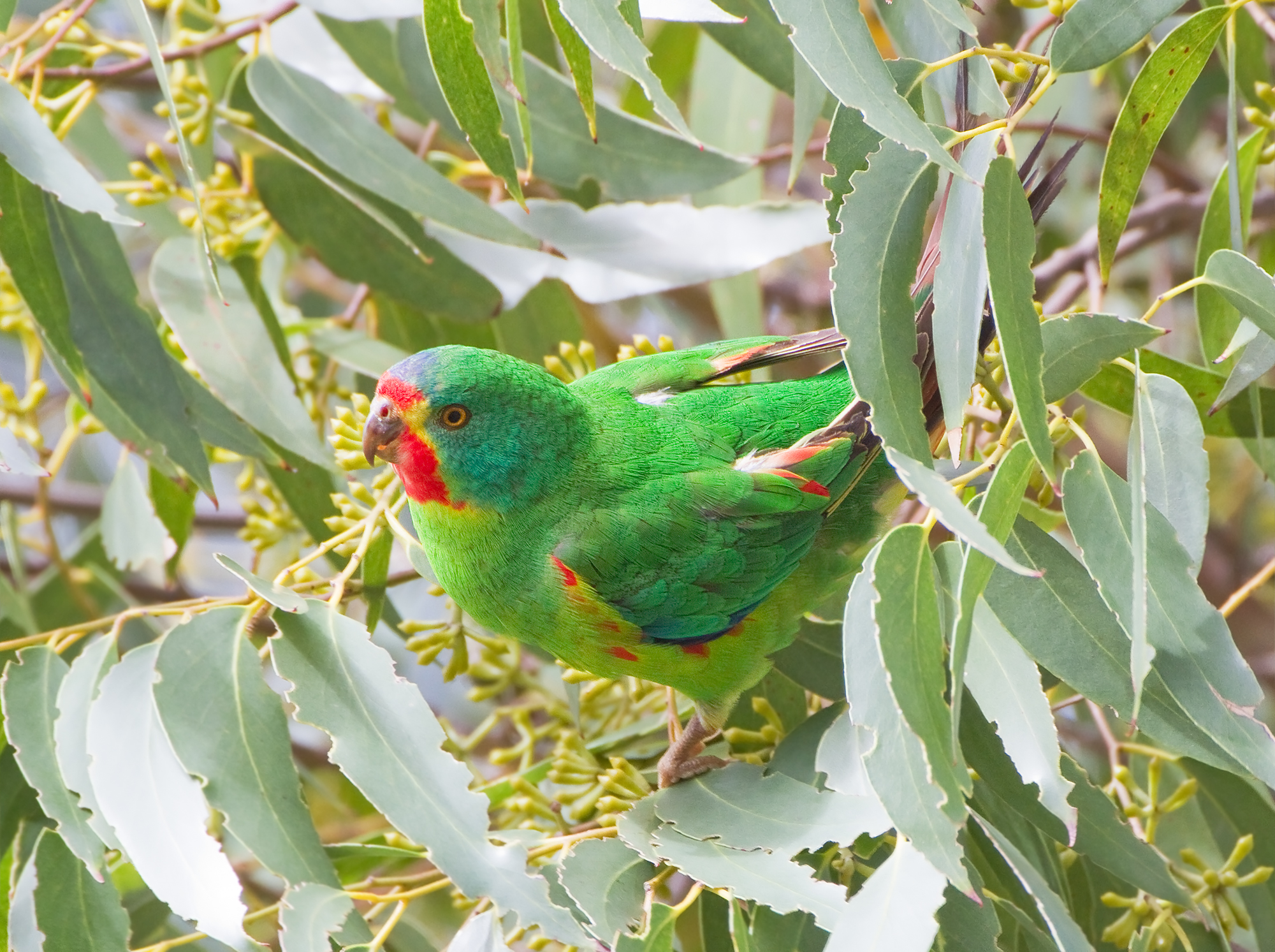
The region is important for swift parrots

The Maryborough-Dunolly Box-Ironbark Region includes all the box-ironbark forest and woodland remnants used as winter feeding habitat by swift parrots in the Maryborough-Dunolly region of central Victoria, south-eastern Australia. The 900 km^{2} region was identified by BirdLife International as an Important Bird Area (IBA) and includes several nature reserves, state parks and state forests, with only a few small blocks of private land. It excludes adjacent areas of woodland that are less suitable for the parrots.

== Birds ==
The region was identified as an Important Bird Area (IBA) because, when the flowering conditions are suitable it supports up to about 250 non-breeding swift parrots. It is also home to a small population of diamond firetails. Other woodland birds recorded from the IBA include painted honeyeaters, brown treecreepers, speckled warblers, hooded robins, crested bellbirds and Gilbert's whistlers, with migrant black honeyeaters and pink robins seen occasionally.
