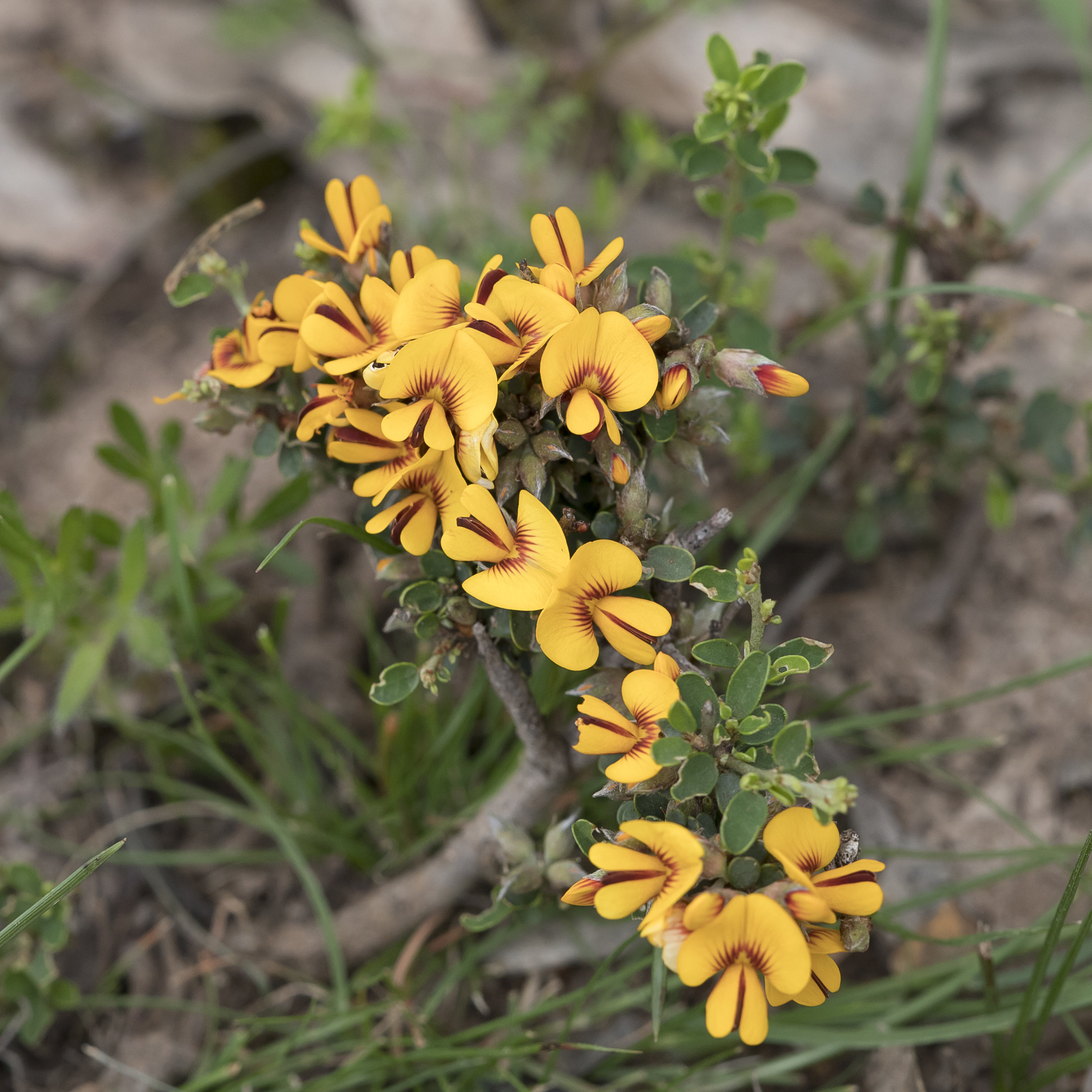
- In Belair National Park

Scientific classification
- Kingdom: Plantae
- Clade: Tracheophytes
- Clade: Angiosperms
- Clade: Eudicots
- Clade: Rosids
- Order: Fabales
- Family: Fabaceae
- Subfamily: Faboideae
- Genus: Pultenaea
- Species: P. largiflorens

Binomial name
- Pultenaea largiflorens F.Muell. ex Benth.

Synonyms
- Pultenaea largiflorens F.Muell. nom. inval., nom. nud.; Pultenaea largiflorens F.Muell. ex Benth. var. largiflorens; Pultenaea largiflorens var. latifolia H.B.Will.; Pultenaea stricta var. largiflorens (F.Muell. ex Benth.) Ewart

= Pultenaea largiflorens =

Twiggy bush-pea

Species of flowering plant

Pultenaea largiflorens, commonly known as twiggy bush-pea, is a species of flowering plant in the family Fabaceae and is endemic to south-eastern continental Australia. It is a rigid, erect shrub with narrow egg-shaped leaves with the narrower end towards the base, and bright yellow and crimson flowers.

== Description ==
Pultenaea largiflorens is a rigid erect shrub that typically grows to a height of 30–50 cm (12–20 in), sometimes higher, and has softly-hairy stems. The leaves are wedge-shaped to narrow egg-shaped with the narrower end towards the base, 3–10 mm (0.12–0.39 in) long and 1.5–4 mm (0.059–0.157 in) wide with triangular stipules less than 1 mm (0.039 in) long pressed against the stem at the base. The leaves are often folded lengthwise and the upper surface is paler than the lower. The flowers are 6–8 mm (0.24–0.31 in) long, sessile or on a pedicel less than 1.5 mm (0.059 in) long. There are overlapping oblong bracts 2–4 mm (0.079–0.157 in) long at the base of the flowers. The sepals are 6–7 mm (0.24–0.28 in) long with egg-shaped bracteoles about 3 mm (0.12 in) long near the base of the sepal tube. The standard and wings are yellow to orange, the standard 7–10 mm (0.28–0.39 in) long, and the keel is crimson. Flowering occurs from July to December and the fruit is an egg-shaped, hairy pod about 4 mm (0.16 in) long.

== Taxonomy and naming ==
Pultenaea largiflorens was first formally described in 1864 by George Bentham in Flora Australiensis from an unpublished description by Ferdinand von Mueller. The specific epithet (largiflorens) means "plentiful-flowering".

== Distribution and habitat ==
Twiggy push-pea grows in forest, woodland and mallee in Victoria, New South Wales and South Australia. It is most common in central Victoria, and occurs in the west of New South Wales, south from West Wyalong and in the south-east of South Australia.
