= Greater Bendigo National Park =

National park in Victoria, Australia

- IUCN category II (national park)
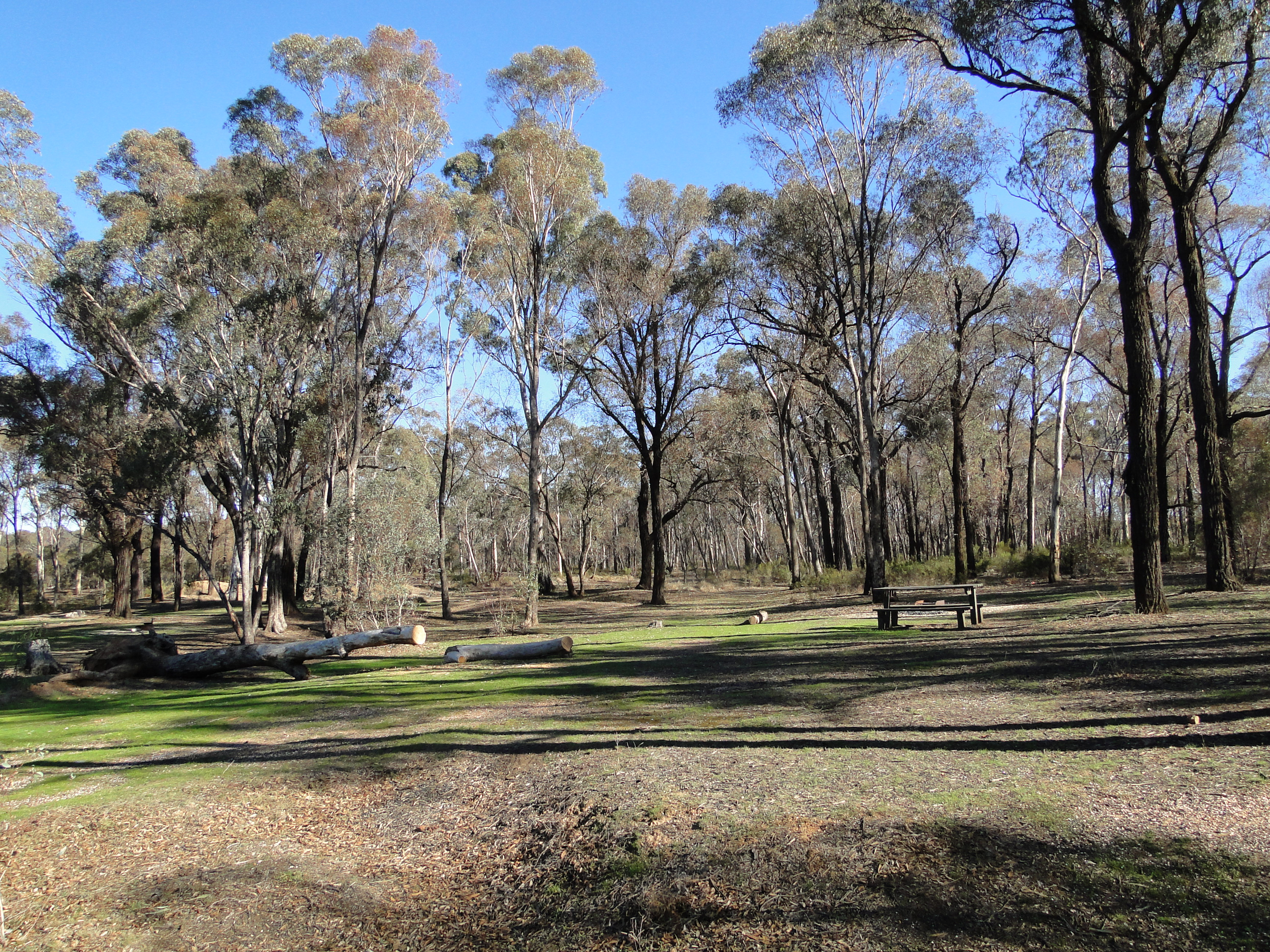
- Notley camping area, Greater Bendigo National Park.

- Location within Victoria
- Location: Victoria
- Nearest city: Bendigo
- Coordinates: 36°40′26″S 144°15′17″E
- Area: 170 km^{2} (66 sq mi)
- Established: 30 October 2002
- Governing body: Parks Victoria
- Website: Official website

The Greater Bendigo National Park is a national park located in the Loddon Mallee region of Victoria, Australia. The 17,020-hectare (42,100-acre) national park was created in 2002 from the former Whipstick State Park, Kamarooka State Park, One Tree Hill Regional Park, Mandurang State Forest and the Sandhurst State Forest.

Much of the park lies within the Bendigo Box-Ironbark Region Important Bird Area, identified as such by BirdLife International because of its importance for swift parrots and other woodland birds.

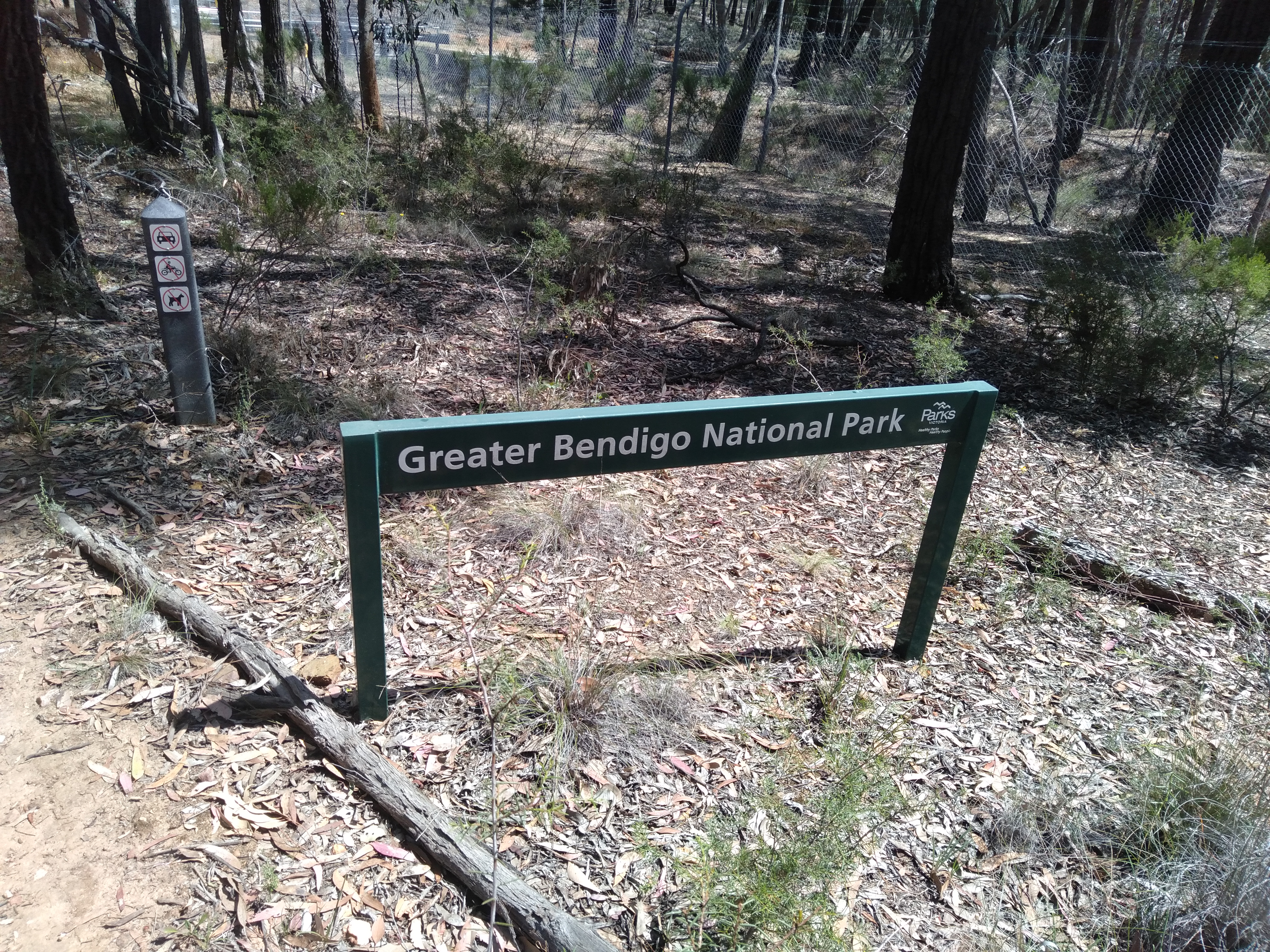
A sign for the National Park

== See also ==
- Protected areas of Victoria
- List of national parks of Australia
