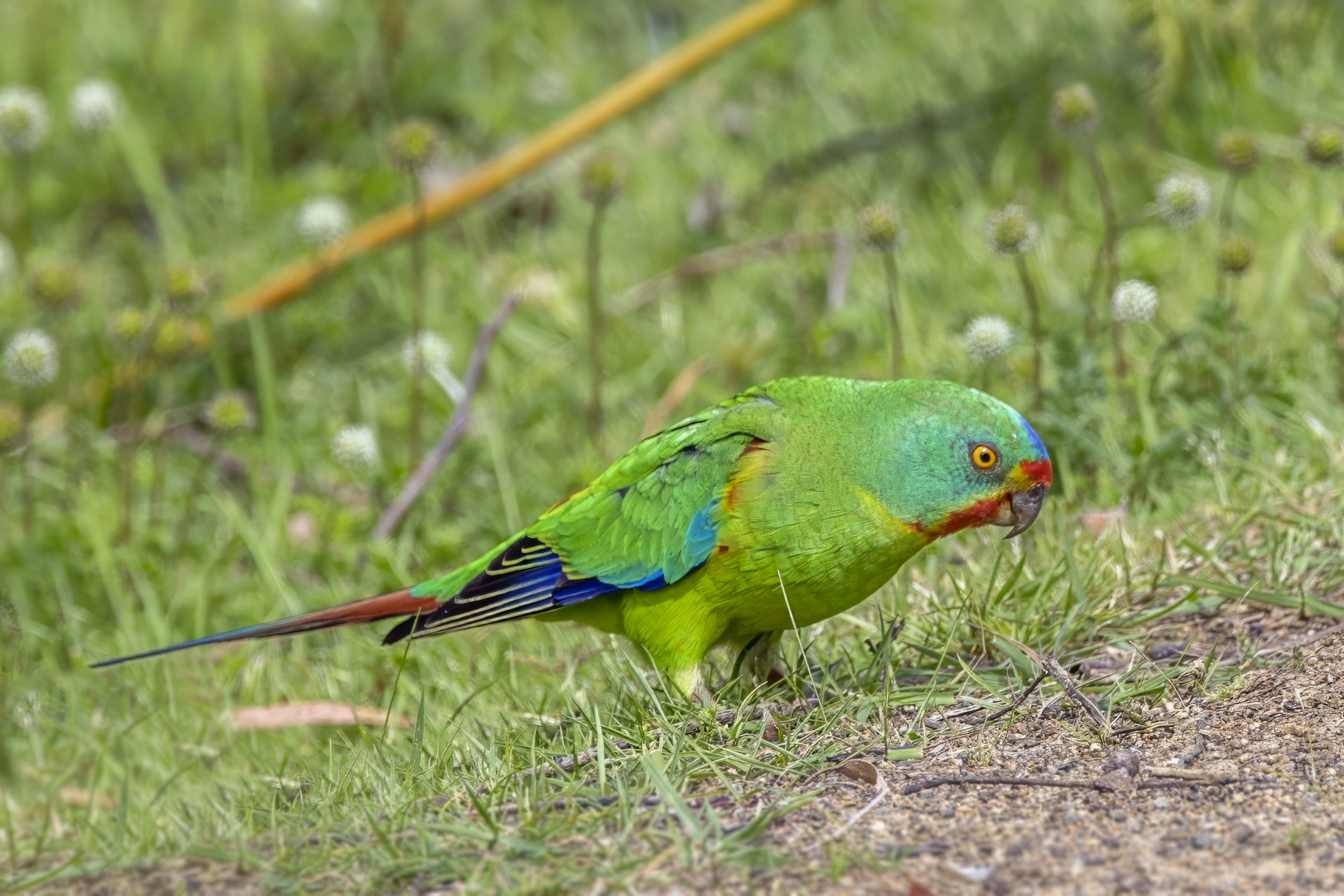
- South Bruny, Tasmania

Conservation status
- Critically Endangered (IUCN 3.1)

Scientific classification
- Kingdom: Animalia
- Phylum: Chordata
- Class: Aves
- Order: Psittaciformes
- Family: Psittaculidae
- Tribe: Platycercini
- Genus: Lathamus; Lesson, 1830
- Species: L. discolor

Binomial name
- Lathamus discolor (Shaw, 1790)
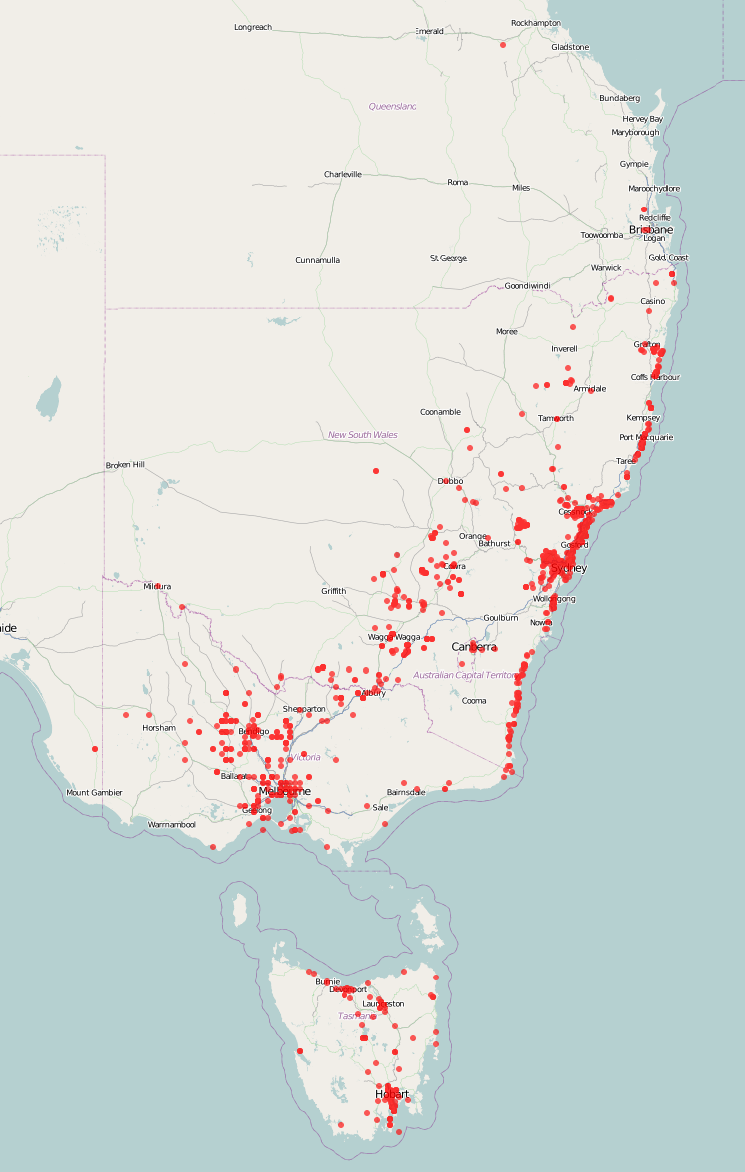
- Distribution of the swift parrot From Atlas of Living Australia

Synonyms
- Psittacus discolor Shaw, 1790; Psittacus sanguinolentus Kerr, 1792; Psittacus lathami Bechstein, 1811; Psittacus humeralis Bechstein, 1811; Psittacus banksianus Vieillot, 1818; Psittacus australis Kuhl 1820; Lathamus rubrifrons Lesson, 1830

= Swift parrot =

Swift parrot, swift waylitja

Critically endangered species of Australian bird

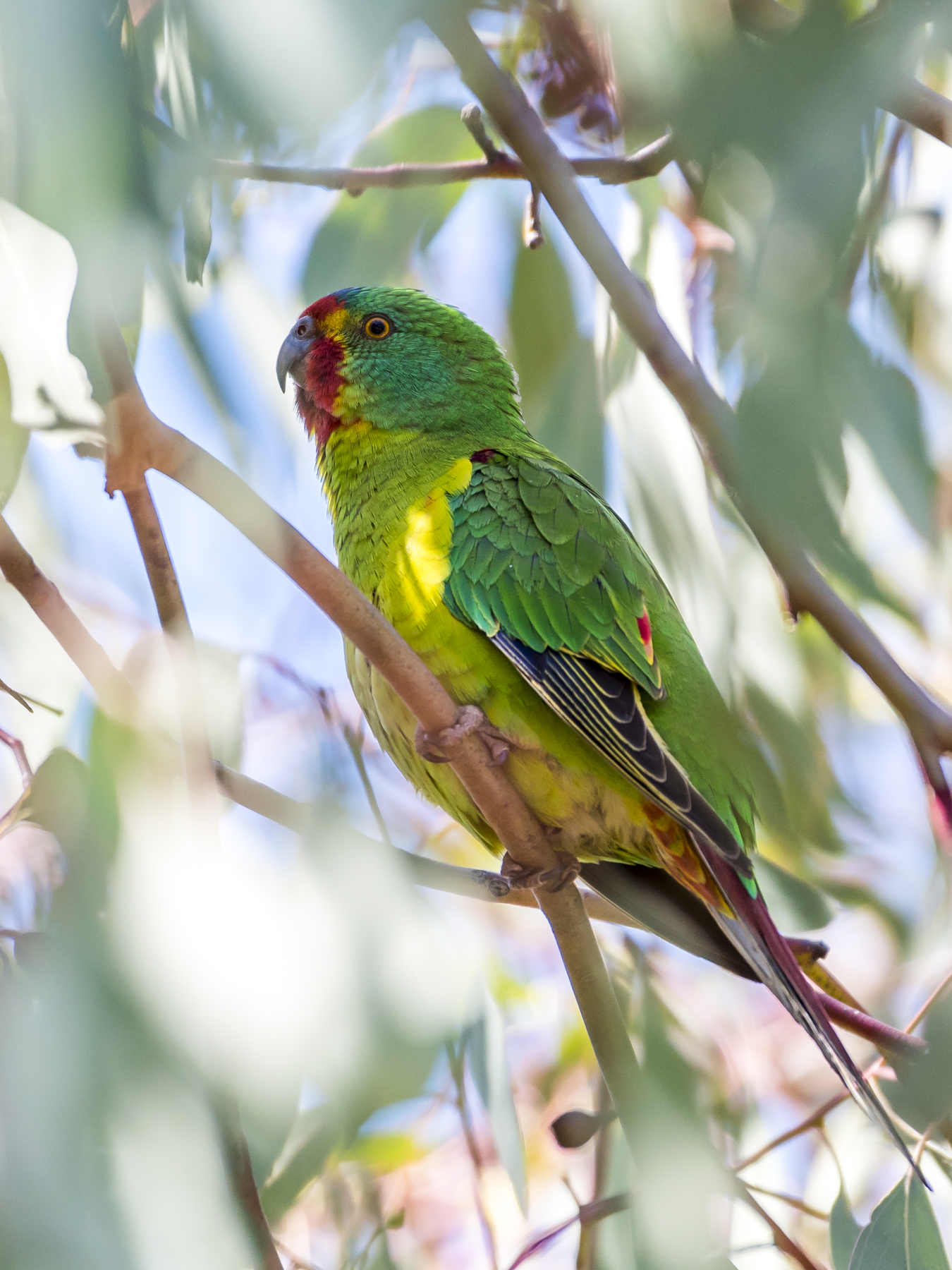
migrant in Canberra, ACT

The swift parrot (Lathamus discolor), also known by the palawa kani name swift waylitja, is a species of broad-tailed parrot, found only in southeastern Australia. The species breeds in Tasmania during the summer and migrates north to southeastern mainland Australia from Griffith-Warialda in New South Wales and west to Adelaide in the winter. It is a nomadic migrant, and it settles in an area only when there is food available. The Swift Parrot was voted 2023 Bird of the Year in The Guardian Australia and BirdLife Australia's biennial poll.

The species is critically endangered, and the severe predation by introduced sugar gliders (Petaurus breviceps) on breeding females and nests in some locations has demonstrated an unexpected but potentially serious new threat. Genetic evidence for the effective population size suggests that the minimum potential population size is now around 300–500 individual swift parrots. This supports the results of earlier studies that use demographic information about swift parrots to predict that the species could be extinct by 2031.

Habitat for the critically endangered swift parrot is being "knowingly destroyed" by logging because of government failures to manage the species' survival.

== Denominations ==
The swift parrot's name is related to its speed during the flight and wing. The name swift waylitja is derived from the palawa kani word waylitja which means parrot.

== Taxonomy ==
The surgeon John White described the swift parrot in 1790 as the red-shouldered paroquet (Psittacus discolor). It was placed in the genus Lathamus by René Primevère Lesson in 1830.

Despite their superficial resemblance to lorikeets in appearance and behaviour, the swift parrot belongs to tribe Platycercini, making them more closely related to rosellas than to lorikeets. Like lorikeets, they possess brush-tipped tongues, although the "bristles" or papillae are shorter and more localised. Their close resemblance to more distantly-related genera is an example of convergent evolution.

A 2011 genetic study including nuclear and mitochondrial DNA found that the swift parrot was an early offshoot from a lineage giving rise to the genera Prosopeia, Eunymphicus and Cyanoramphus, diverging around 14 million years ago.

"Swift parrot" has been designated the official common name by the International Ornithologists' Union (IOC).

== Description ==
The swift parrot is about 25 centimetres (10 in) long and has long pointed wings and long tapering tail feathers. It is mainly green with bluish crown and red on the face above and below the beak. The adult female is slightly duller, and the juvenile has a dark brown iris and a pale orange bill. The forehead to throat is crimson and there is also crimson patch at the top, edge of the wing. They are noisy, always active and showy, and are very fast with their direct flight.

== Breeding ==
The species breeds in Tasmania from September to February. It nests in tree cavities, but is highly selective in the types of cavities it uses as nests. It prefers cavities with small entrances, deep chambers and wide floors. Tree cavities with these traits are rare and comprise only 5% of the available cavities in Tasmanian forests. These cavities are more likely to occur in large trees. These characteristics of tree cavities are important for passive defence of their nests against native Tasmanian predators. Tree cavities suitable for nesting are highly vulnerable to disturbance. Wildfire caused the collapse of 62.8% of known swift parrot nest cavities (and 48.6% of nesting trees). Deforestation (primarily driven by native forest logging) has been an important contemporary cause of habitat loss for swift parrots. In just one area of swift parrot breeding habitat, the southern forests, 33% of total forest cover was lost/disturbed by logging between 1996–2016, and 23% of potential swift parrot nesting habitat was logged over this same time period. The local extent of deforestation is also positively correlated with other threats to the parrots like predation by sugar gliders.

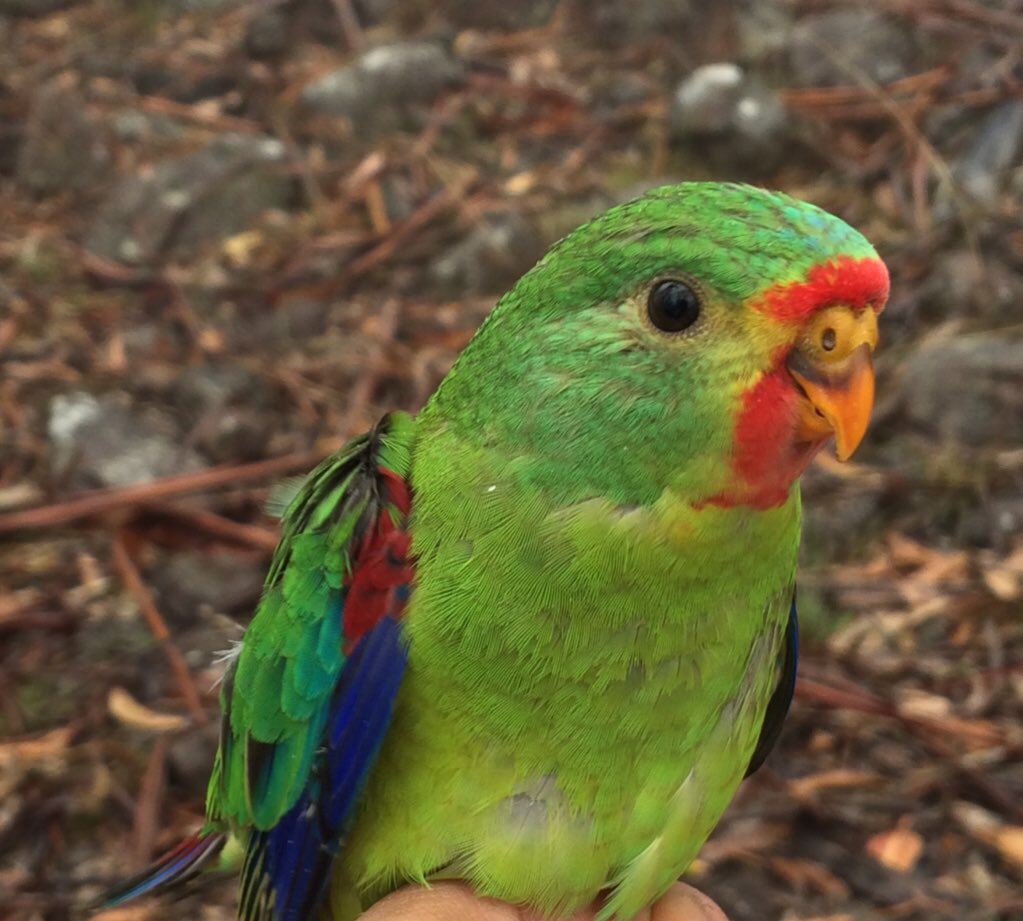
A juvenile swift parrot in Tasmania.

Swift parrots select where to breed in Tasmania based on the local availability of both food and nesting sites. The parrots settle wherever in Tasmania their preferred food (nectar from flowering Eucalyptus globulus and Eucalyptus ovata) is abundant, but birds can only breed where suitable nesting sites are also available nearby. Because swift parrots prefer to breed in the most resource rich patch of food, they are able to rear their nestlings in the 'best' conditions each year. Successful swift parrot nests have a mean clutch sizes of 3.8 eggs, and produce 3.2 fledglings, equating to breeding success of 86.9%. However sugar gliders, which are introduced to Tasmania, are a major nest predator of swift parrots. Sugar gliders can result in locally severe parrot nesting failure, and there is a positive relationship between the severity of glider predation and land-cover of mature forest within 500m of a swift parrot nest. This relationship means that in locations where forest cover is low and disturbed, nest failure of swift parrots can be as high as 100%. Sugar gliders are tolerant of forest disturbance, and have high rates of occupancy of swift parrot habitat in Tasmania. On offshore islands where sugar gliders are absent, swift parrots have higher breeding success.

== Distribution ==
Genetic evidence has shown that the swift parrot is a single, genetically mixed and nomadic population that moves around the landscape each year. Because they are nomadic, swift parrots can occur across a very large potential area, but settlement at a given location depends on the local availability of food. However, in the Tasmanian breeding range, swift parrots need both food and suitable nesting sites to occur in close proximity in order to nest at a given site. The swift parrot migrates each year across Bass Strait between Tasmania and the mainland of Australia. They arrive in Tasmania during September and return to south-eastern Australia during March and April. They can be found as far north as south-eastern Queensland and as far west as Adelaide in South Australia, although recent sightings have been restricted to the south-eastern part of the state. Because swift parrots are nomadic migrants, their occurrence at any one location are difficult to predict. Although they will repeatedly return to the same locations, local occurrence may only happen intermittently depending on whether or not food (flowering trees) is available in a given year.

=== Important Bird Areas ===
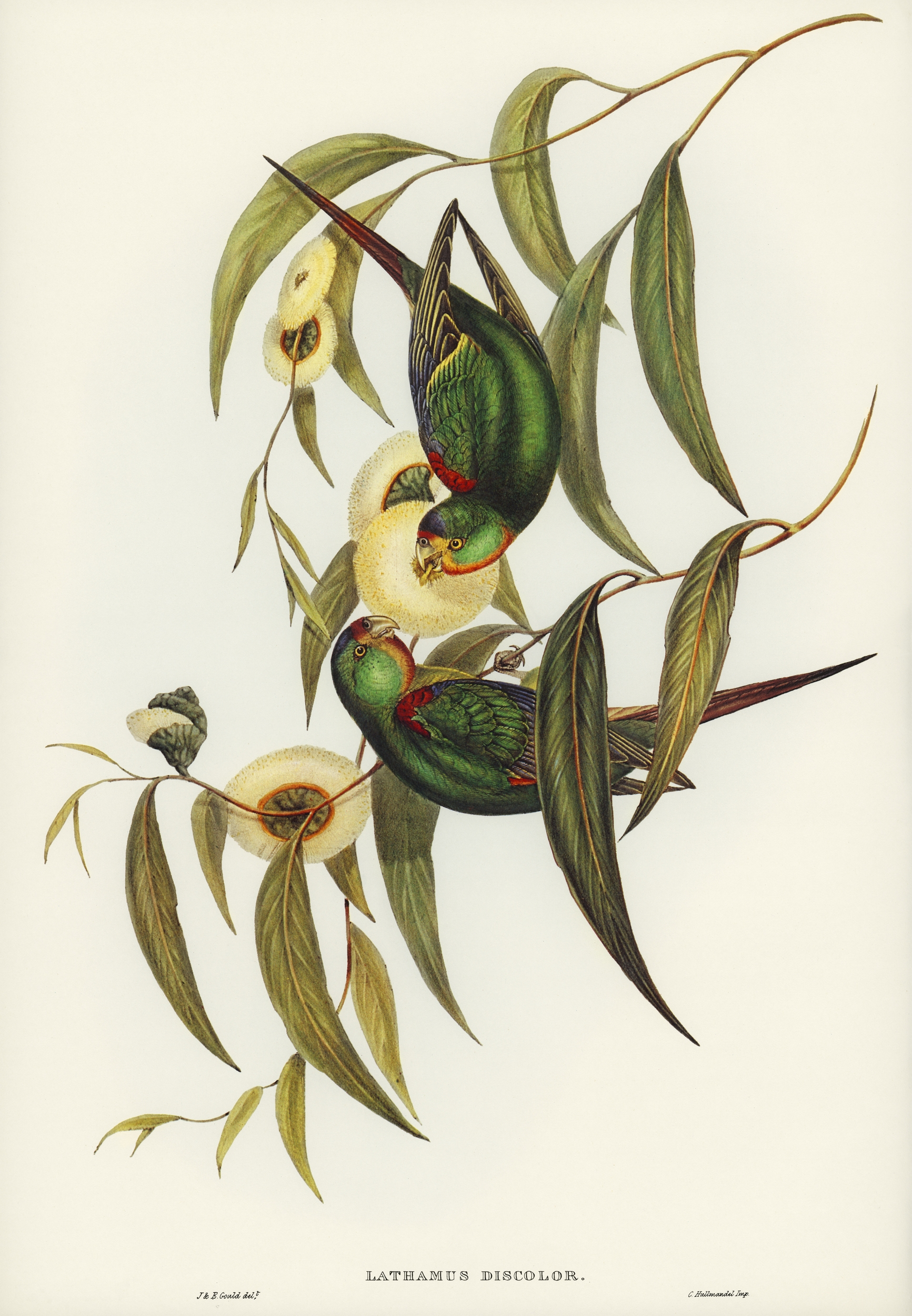
Swift Lorikeet (Lathamus discolor) illustrated by Elizabeth Gould (1804–1841) for John Gould's (1804–1881) Birds of Australia (1972 Edition, 8 volumes).

BirdLife International has identified the following sites as being important for swift parrots:

New South Wales

- Brisbane Water
- Capertee Valley
- Hastings-Macleay
- Hunter Valley
- Lake Macquarie
- Richmond Woodlands
- South-west Slopes of NSW
- Tuggerah
- Ulladulla to Merimbula

Victoria

- Bendigo Box-Ironbark Region
- Maryborough-Dunolly Box-Ironbark Region
- Puckapunyal
- Rushworth Box-Ironbark Region
- St Arnaud Box-Ironbark Region
- Warby-Chiltern Box-Ironbark Region

Tasmania

- Bruny Island
- Maria Island
- South-east Tasmania

== Habitat ==
Mudgereeba, SE Queensland, Australia

Usually inhabiting: forests, woodlands, agricultural land and plantations, and also in urban areas.

== Diet ==
Swift parrots are primarily nectar feeders, preferring nectar from flowering Eucalyptus spp. In Tasmania, their settlement of breeding habitat is regulated by the occurrence of flowering in their two main food trees Eucalyptus globulus and Eucalyptus ovata. In the winter, their habitat use is broader, with foraging occurring on a range of flowering Eucalyptus spp. across southeastern mainland Australia.

== Conservation status ==
Modelling of demographic data predicted that the swift parrot is Critically Endangered. Further modelling showed that other aspects of their life history (sex ratio bias and shared paternity) makes their population declines worse than originally predicted. Genetic evidence showed there is only one swift parrot population, so threats at different times and places can potentially act on the entire population. Although expert opinion has estimated the species population size as approximately 2,000 individuals, extensive genetic evidence suggests this is overly optimistic, and that the (minimum) census size of the population may be around 300–500 individuals. Severe deforestation of their breeding range has been long recognised as the principal threat to the species. Logging has already had severe impacts on habitat availability in recent decades and there is evidence that up to 23% of swift parrot breeding habitat has been logged just in the Southern Forests region of Tasmania over the last 20 years. Deforestation also affects the rate of predation by sugar gliders – where mature forest cover is diminished, parrots suffer worse predation rates. Sugar glider predation is worst where logging is severe; these threats interact in a synergistic manner.

Given the severity of deforestation across the breeding range, and the relationship between deforestation and sugar glider predation intensity, habitat loss in critical breeding areas of Tasmania may be the species most severe threat. Unfortunately, there is evidence that weak and ineffective policy for protection of threatened species in Tasmania's logged forests is likely to continue to threaten the swift parrot into the future.

Matthew Webb and Dejan Stojanovic, two of the Eureka prize finalists from the Australian National University's Difficult Bird Research Group, say governments have stalled on management plans that would protect known feeding and nesting habitat in Tasmania. The researchers analysed logging in Tasmania's southern forests during the 20-year course of the previous regional forest agreement. They found that a third of the eucalypt forest in this area had been logged between 1997 and 2016 and a quarter of old growth trees that provide nesting habitat for swift parrots had been cleared. "It is very clear that critical breeding habitat is being logged and that current logging regimes are not sustainable," the paper states.

=== Australia ===
Swift parrots are listed as Endangered on the Australian Environment Protection and Biodiversity Conservation Act 1999 (EPBC Act), which has been criticised for failing to protect them and other threatened species.

==== Victoria ====
The swift parrot is listed as threatened on the Victorian Flora and Fauna Guarantee Act (1988). Under this Act, an Action Statement for the recovery and future management of this species has been prepared.

- On the 2007 advisory list of threatened vertebrate fauna in Victoria, the swift parrot was listed as Endangered.
