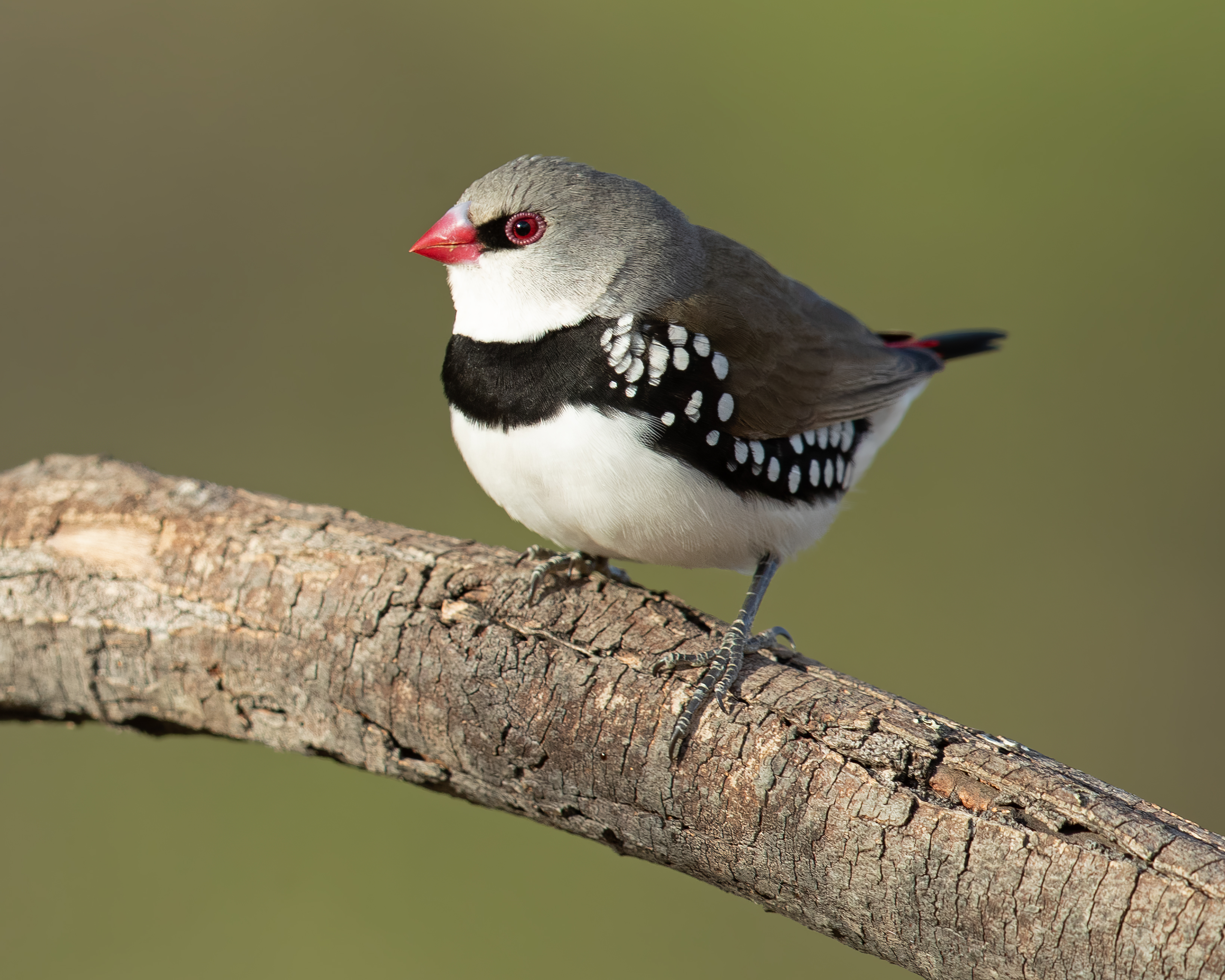

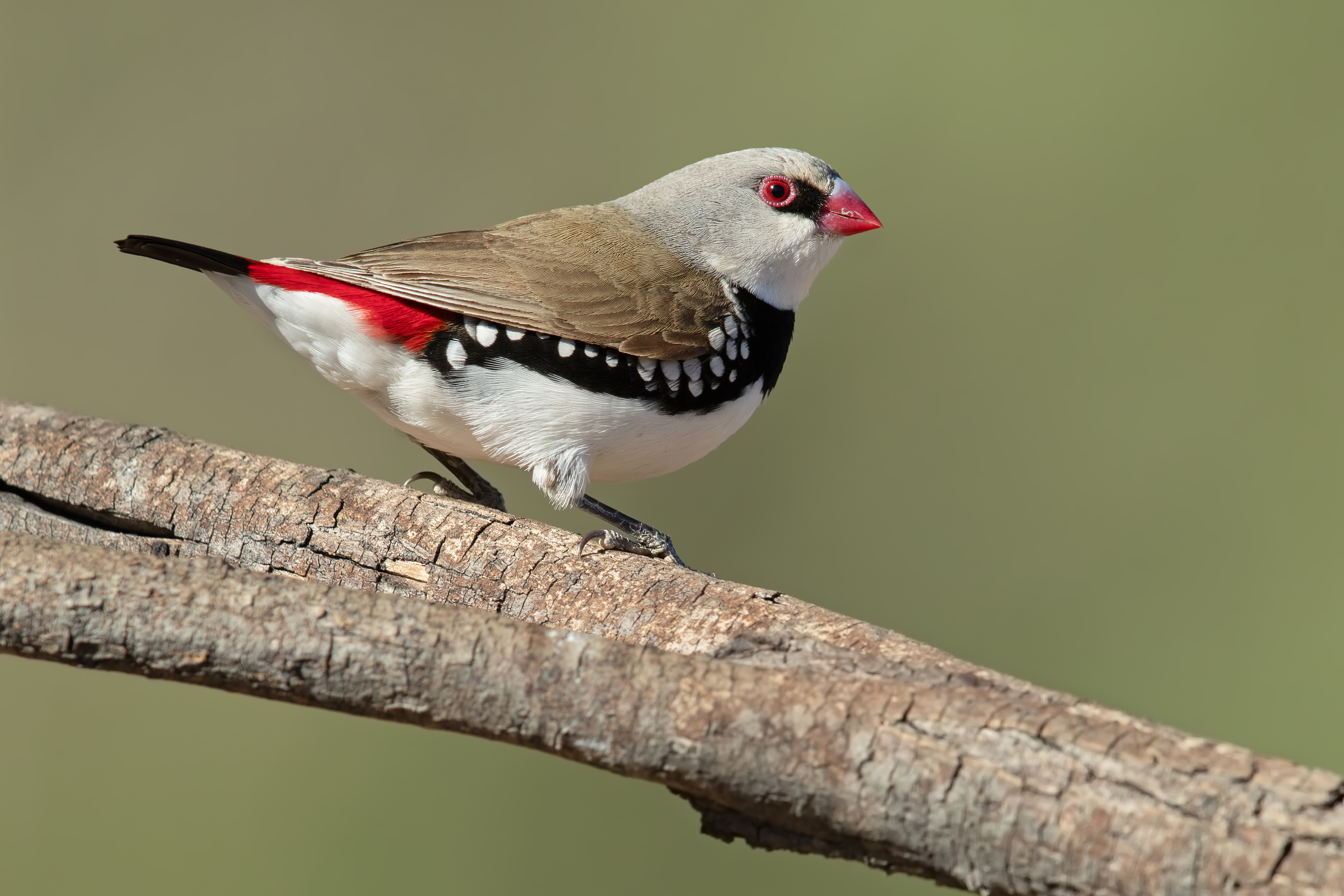

Conservation status
- Vulnerable (IUCN 3.1)

Scientific classification
- Kingdom: Animalia
- Phylum: Chordata
- Class: Aves
- Order: Passeriformes
- Family: Estrildidae
- Genus: Stagonopleura
- Species: S. guttata

Binomial name
- Stagonopleura guttata (Shaw, 1796)

= Diamond firetail =

Species of estrildid finch

The diamond firetail (Stagonopleura guttata) is a species of estrildid finch that is endemic to Australia. It has a patchy distribution and generally occupies drier forests and grassy woodlands west of the Great Dividing Range from South East Queensland to the Eyre Peninsula in South Australia. While it is a small stocky bird it is one of the largest finches in Australia. The birds are very distinctive with a black breast-band on a white breast. The flanks are black with white spots and it has a scarlet rump (hence the name) and a black tail.

== Taxonomy ==
The family Estrildidae (grass-finches) was named by Swainson in 1827 and "finch" can be traced back to the Old English finc but its origin is debated. Firetail is now used to describe the three species of Stagonopleura. The red-browed finch (Neochmia temporalis) is no longer considered a firetail even though it has a red rump.

The diamond firetail has also been known as the "spotted finch (Lewin 1808), spotted grossbeak (Lewin 1822), spotted-sided grossbeak (Latham 1823), spotted-sided finch (Mathews 1927) and spotted- finch (Gould 1848)". The name diamond firetail was first used in the Royal Australian Ornithological Union (RAOU's) second official checklist in 1926. Stagonopleura, is from the Greek for 'spotty flanks' and guttata from the Latin gutta, a 'droplet'.

== Description ==
The diamond firetail is one of the largest of the Australian finches by both weight (15–19 g) and wingspan (64–71 mm). eBird describes the firetail having an olive back and grey head. The belly and throat are white with a complete black band. The flanks are black with distinctive white spots. The rump is bright red and the tip of the tail is black. The rump is also described as scarlet by some authors. Juvenile diamond firetails are duller than the adults and have a black bill.

The rump is very distinctive in flight. These birds are generally seen in pairs or small flocks, sometimes up to a hundred birds. The birds fly low and in long lines.

== Distribution and habitat ==
The diamond firetail has a patchy distribution from Southeast Queensland to the Eyre Peninsula in South Australia. The Australian Bird Guide shows its core distribution from southern Queensland (just north in Inglewood) through to Victoria and around the coast to the Eyre Peninsula in South Australia and the eBird distribution is similar. Birdlife Australia has a more extensive distribution from the Carnarvon Ranges in Queensland to the Eyre Peninsula and Kangaroo Island which is broader than other references. This broader distribution reflects the historic range of the bird based on the surveys done for The Atlas of Australian Birds. The species was recorded as far north as the Kirrama Tableland in North Queensland in 1917, as a "new record for the district".

The bird is mostly sedentary and lives in open grassy eucalypt forest and woodland, heath, mallee country, farmland and grassland with scattered trees. The bird's habitat has been threatened by alteration of vegetation structure caused by over-grazing, weed invasion, salinisation and other flow-on processes. This loss of main food plants and habitat results in competition with invasive species, and increased predation.

== Behaviour ==
=== Feeding ===
Diamond firetails are ground feeders with a diet of grass seeds; ripe or partially ripe. They have also been observed eating insects and larvae. While feeding they will be seen hopping on the ground but if disturbed they will fly into nearby trees.

=== Vocalisation ===
The Slater Field Guide notes the voice is a penetrating twoo-hee or pain, while the Australian Bird Guide describes the contact call as a "drawn out, mournful whistle like descending call of black-eared cuckoo, though typically disyllabic, with first syllable ascending and second descending". They are generally silent in flight.

=== Reproduction ===
Nests are built with green grass, leaves and stems then lined with feathers and fine grasses. Nests can be found in dense foliage such as "hakeas, rose bushes, boxthorn and the sharp-sounding Sea Urchin Hakea" and high in trees including within mistletoe and babblers' nests. It has also been known to build in hawks' nests. Birdlife Australia records "To safeguard their eggs and nestlings, diamond firetails are often recorded building their nests into the base of the large stick-nest of a bird of prey, such as a whistling kite, white-bellied sea-eagle, wedge-tailed eagle, brown falcon, nankeen kestrel or a square-tailed kite. One nest of a whistling kite contained nine diamond firetail nests!"

The incubation and care for the young is done by both partners. Normally only one clutch of between 4 and 9 eggs is laid per season.

== Status and conservation ==
- Internationally

* The species is listed under the IUCN Red List of Threatened Species as a species of Vulnerable.

- Australia

* The species is nationally listed as Vulnerable under the EPBC Act.
* In NSW, it is listed as Vulnerable under the Biodiversity Conservation Act 2016.
* In Queensland, the species is listed as Vulnerable under the Nature Conservation (Animals) Regulation 2020.
* In South Australia, the species is listed as Vulnerable under the National Parks and Wildlife Act 1972.
* In Victoria, the species is listed as Vulnerable under the Flora and Fauna Guarantee Act 1988.

== Aviculture ==
The striking plumage of the diamond firetails make them popular in aviculture. However, they are not particularly suited for inexperienced keepers as they are hard to breed, are assertive in behaviour, and are difficult to sex. In some Australian states, strict licensing requirements apply.

=== Mutations ===
There are few mutations in the diamond firetail. However, one mutation produces an orange tail instead of the fiery red. In this case the bird is known as the yellow diamond. Other mutations are the pied diamond which has splashes of white, the white diamond, and the fawn diamond.

=== Nutrition ===
The birds will eat lettuce, spinach, chickweed, spray millet, eggfood, broccoli tops, sprouted seed, meal worms, small cockroaches, small crickets, hulled oats and carrot tops.

== Gallery ==
Sundown NP, S Queensland, Australia

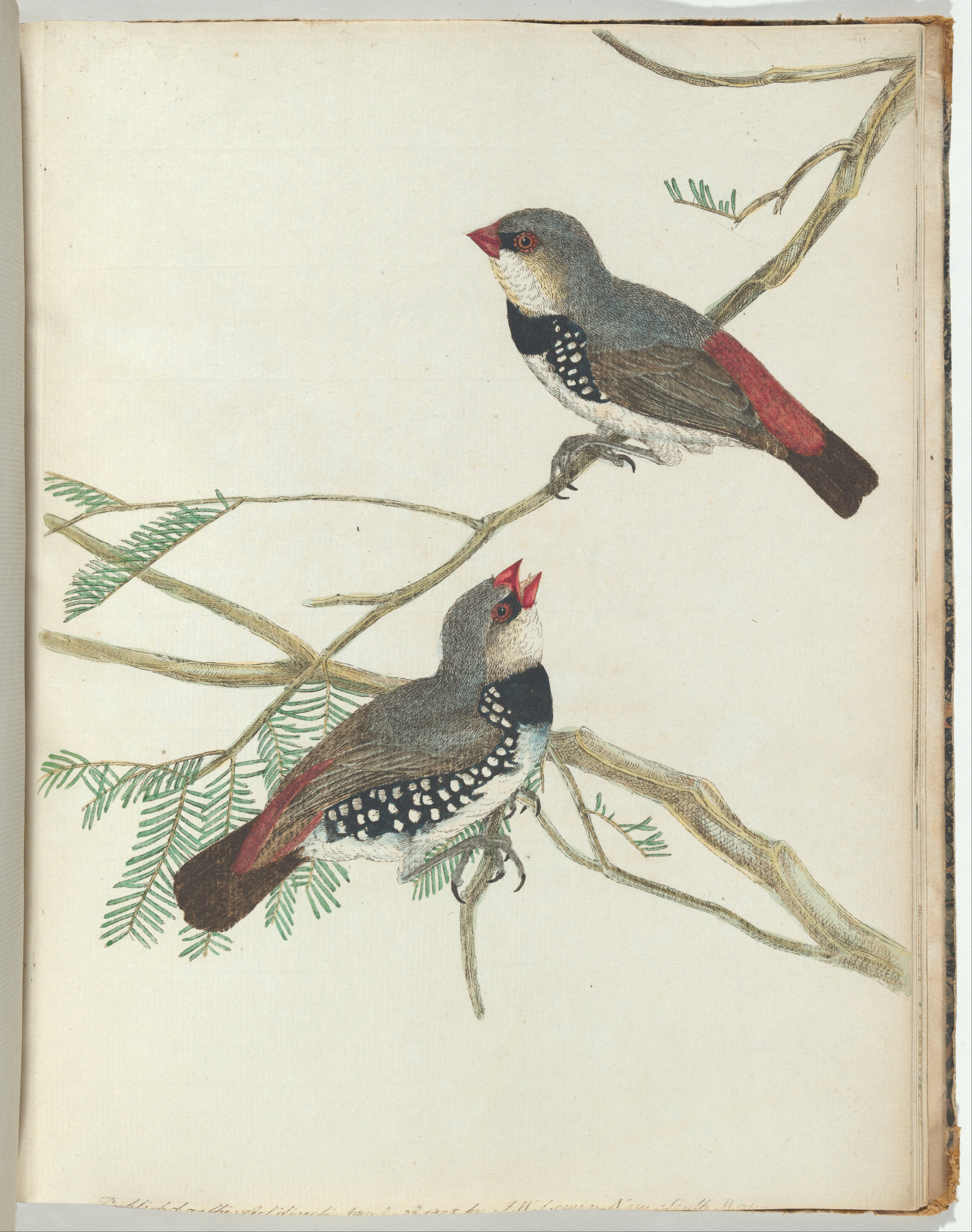
Lewin- spotted grossbeak 1819

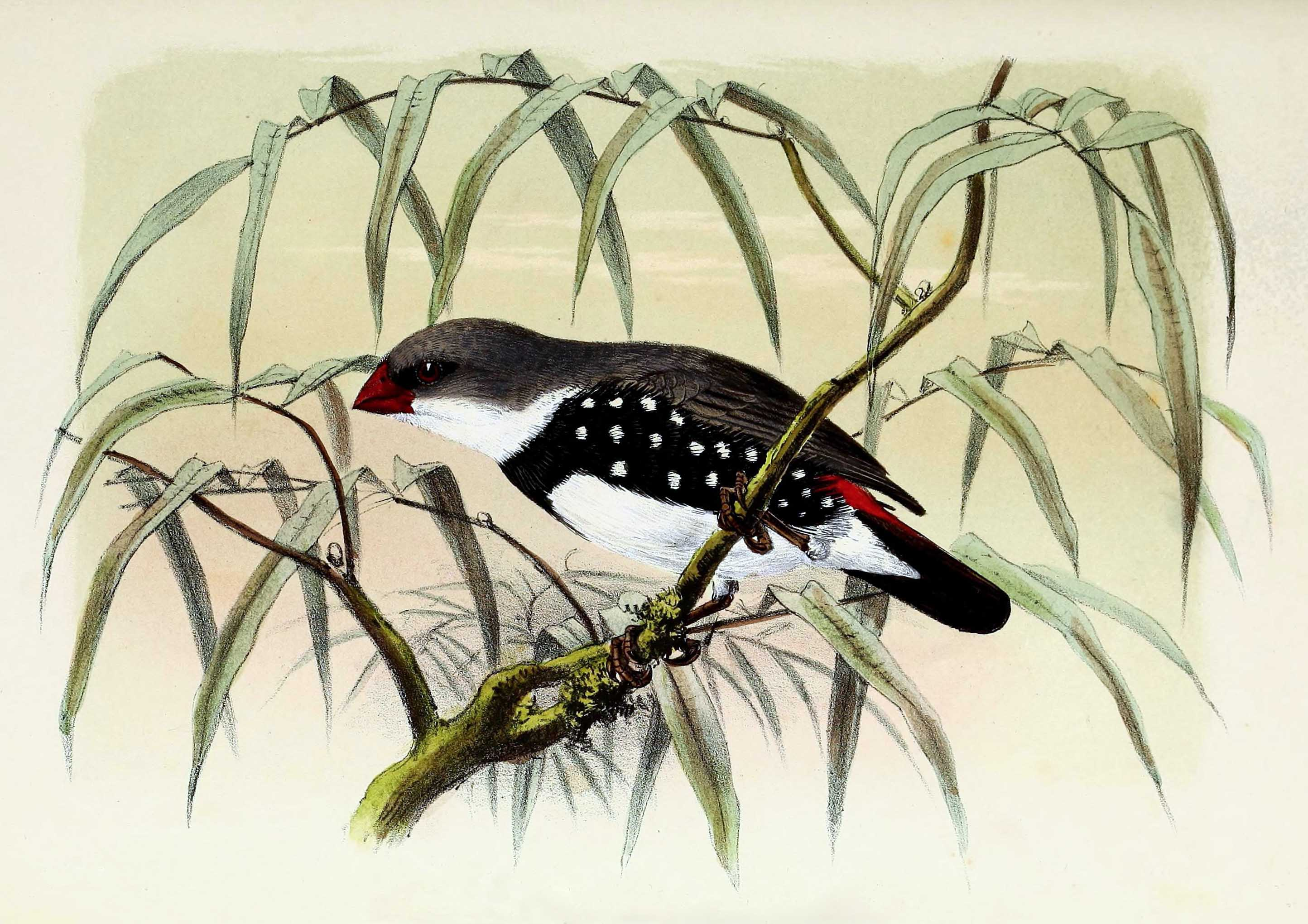
Stagonopleura guttata, John Gerrard Keulemans, 1873

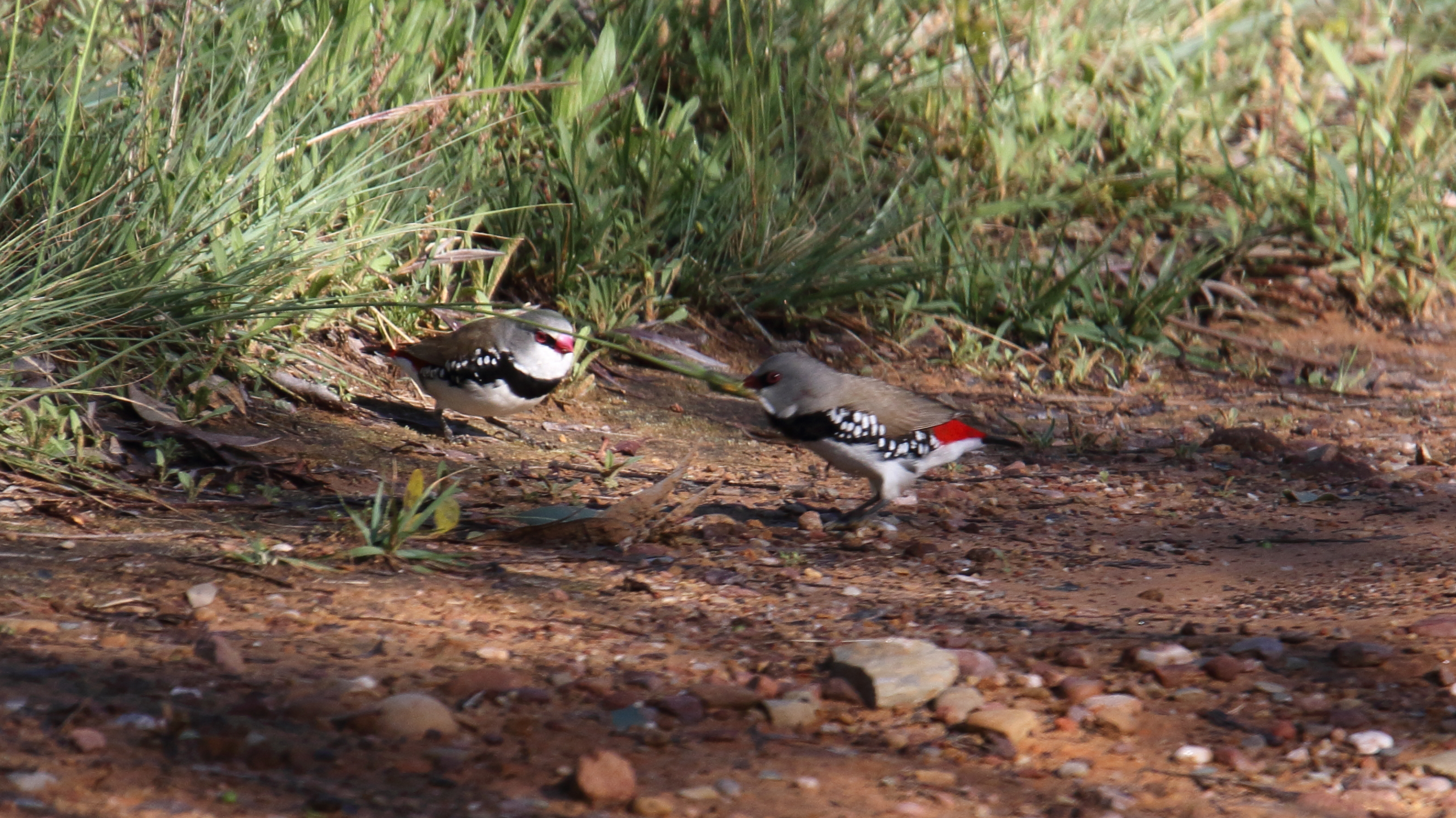
Diamond firetail feeding

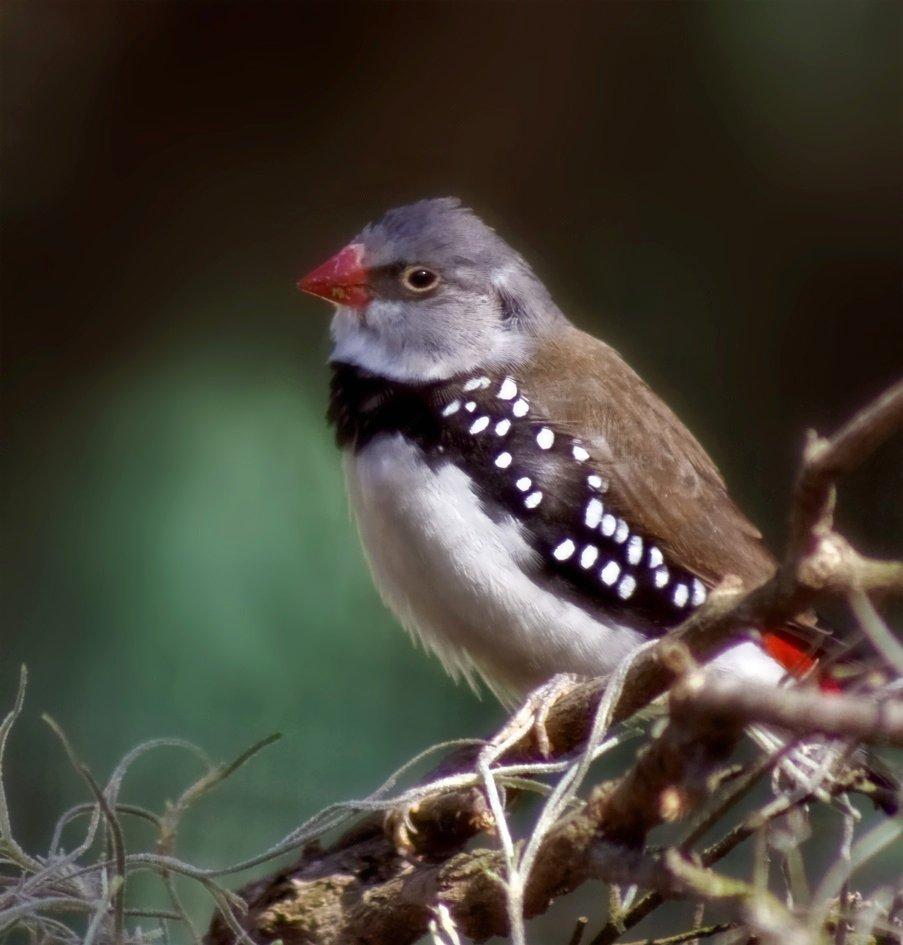
Auburn Botanical Gardens, NSW
