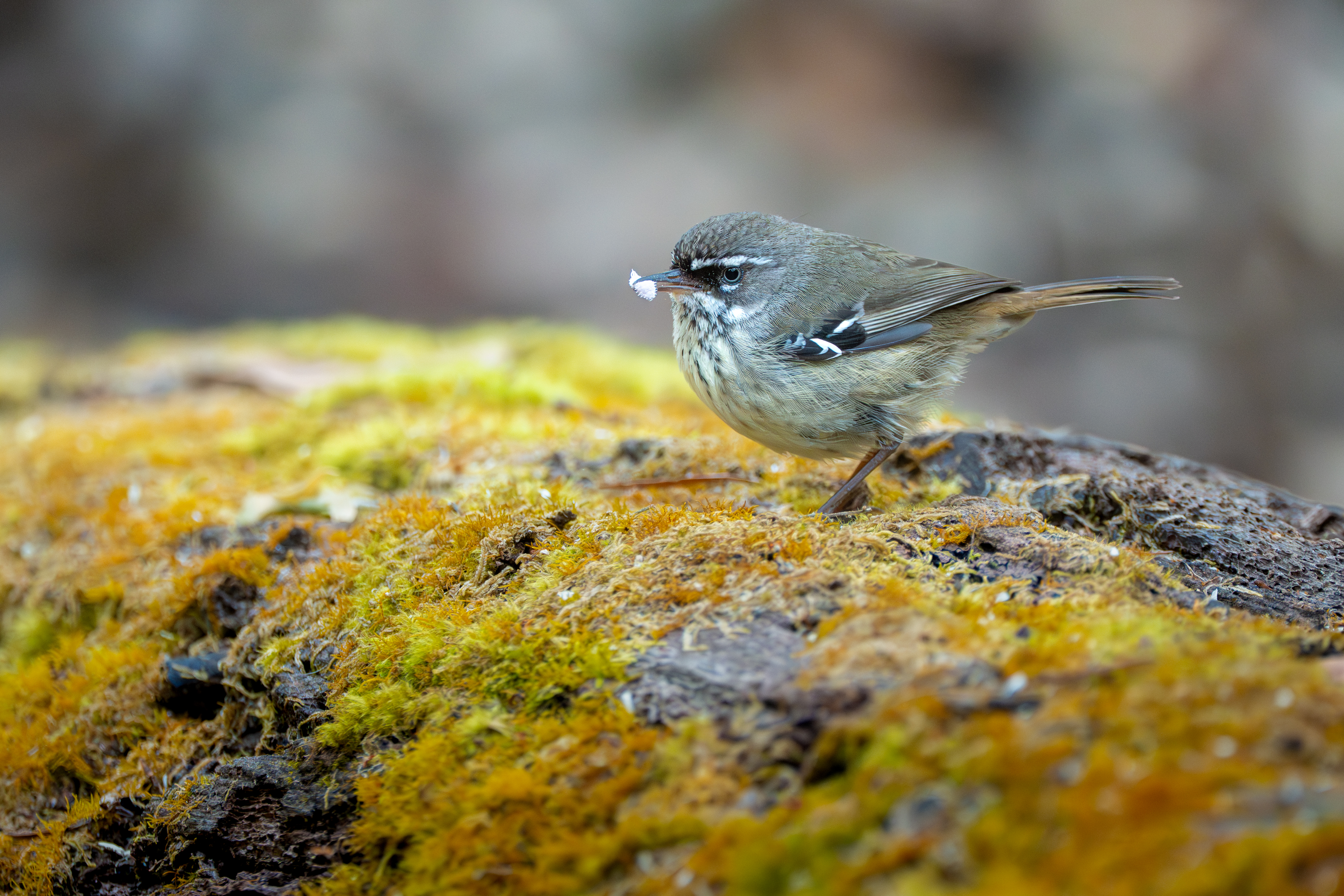
- Spotted scrubwren with captured prey in beak

Scientific classification
- Kingdom: Animalia
- Phylum: Chordata
- Class: Aves
- Order: Passeriformes
- Family: Acanthizidae
- Genus: Sericornis
- Species: S. maculatus

Binomial name
- Sericornis maculatus Gould, 1847

= Spotted scrubwren =

Species of bird

The spotted scrubwren (Sericornis maculatus) is a bird species native to coastal southern Australia, from Adelaide westwards to Shark Bay in Western Australia. It was formerly considered conspecific with the white-browed scrubwren, and is known to hybridize with that species where their ranges overlap in the Adelaide area. Genetic analysis in a 2018 study of the family found that this taxon was more divergent from the white-browed scrubwren than the Tasmanian or Atherton scrubwrens and hence proposed its reclassification as a species. It was reclassified as a species in 2019.

== Taxonomy ==
Sericornis maculatus includes the following subspecies:

- S. m. ashbyi - Mathews, 1912
- S. m. mellori - Mathews, 1912
- S. m. maculatus - Gould, 1847
- S. m. balstoni - Ogilvie-Grant, 1909
