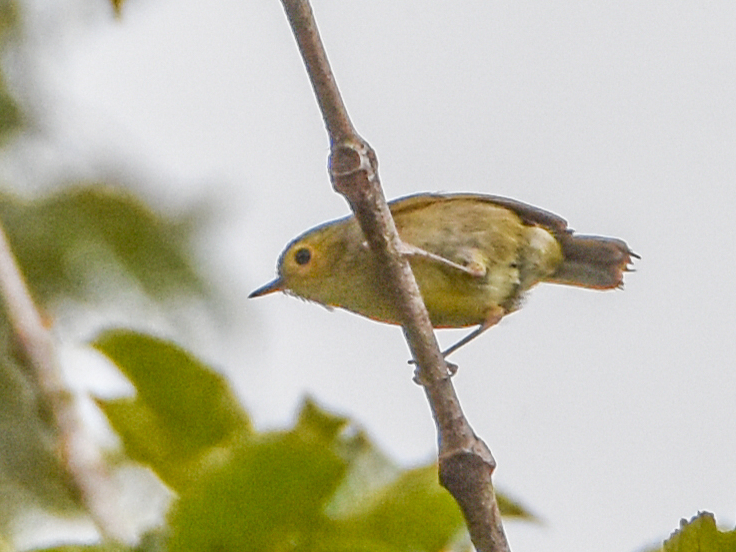

Conservation status
- Least Concern (IUCN 3.1)

Scientific classification
- Kingdom: Animalia
- Phylum: Chordata
- Class: Aves
- Order: Passeriformes
- Family: Acanthizidae
- Genus: Aethomyias
- Species: A. perspicillatus

Binomial name
- Aethomyias perspicillatus (Salvadori, 1896)

Synonyms
- Sericornis perspicillatus

= Buff-faced scrubwren =

Species of bird

The buff-faced scrubwren (Aethomyias perspicillatus) is a bird species in the family Acanthizidae. It is found in the highlands of New Guinea; Its natural habitat is subtropical or tropical moist montane forests.

This species was formerly placed in the genus Sericornis but following the publication of a molecular phylogenetic study of the scrubwrens in 2018, it was moved to the resurrected genus Aethomyias.
