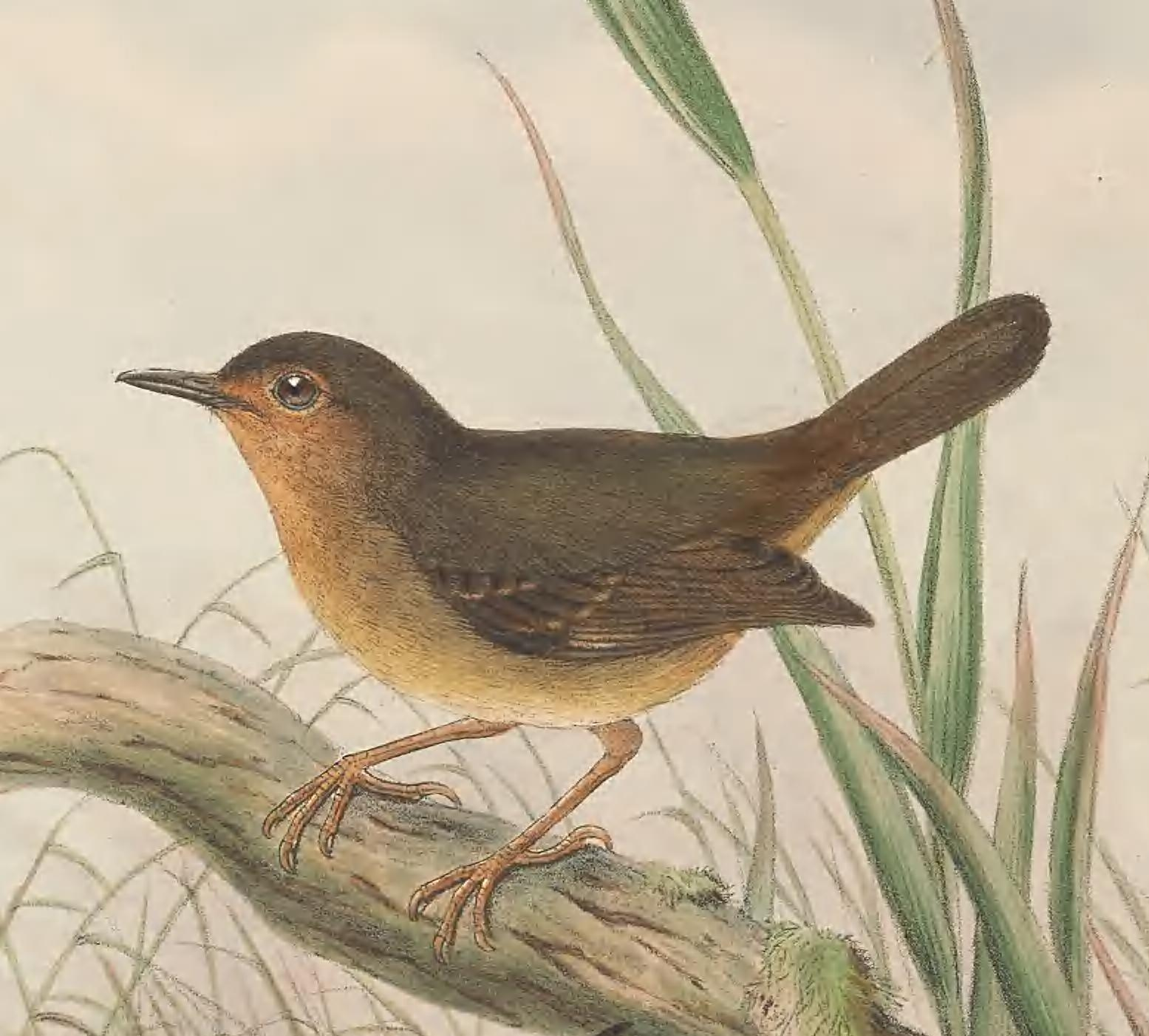
- Grey-green scrubwren, Aethomyias arfakianus by William Matthew Hart

Scientific classification
- Kingdom: Animalia
- Phylum: Chordata
- Class: Aves
- Order: Passeriformes
- Family: Acanthizidae
- Genus: Aethomyias; Sharpe, 1879

Type species
- Entomophila spliodera Gray, G.R., 1859

= Aethomyias =

Genus of birds in the family Acanthizidae

Aethomyias is a genus of passerine birds in the family Acanthizidae that are endemic to New Guinea.

A molecular phylogenetic study of the scrubwrens and mouse-warblers published in 2018 led to a substantial revision of the taxonomic classification. In the reorganisation the genus Aethomyias was resurrected to bring together a group of scrubwrens that had previously been placed in the genera Sericornis and Crateroscelis. The genus Aethomyias had originally been introduced by the English ornithologist Richard Bowdler Sharpe in 1879 to accommodate a single species, Entomophila spliodera G.R. Gray 1859, the pale-billed scrubwren, which is therefore the type species. The name of the genus combines the Ancient Greek aēthēs "unusual" or "change" with the Modern Latin myias meaning "flycatcher".

== Species ==
The genus contains six species:

Image	Common name	Scientific name	Distribution
	Bicolored scrubwren	Aethomyias nigrorufus	New Guinea
	Pale-billed scrubwren	Aethomyias spilodera	New Guinea
	Vogelkop scrubwren	Aethomyias rufescens	West Papua, Indonesia
	Buff-faced scrubwren	Aethomyias perspicillatus	New Guinea
	Papuan scrubwren	Aethomyias papuensis	New Guinea
	Grey-green scrubwren	Aethomyias arfakianus	New Guinea
