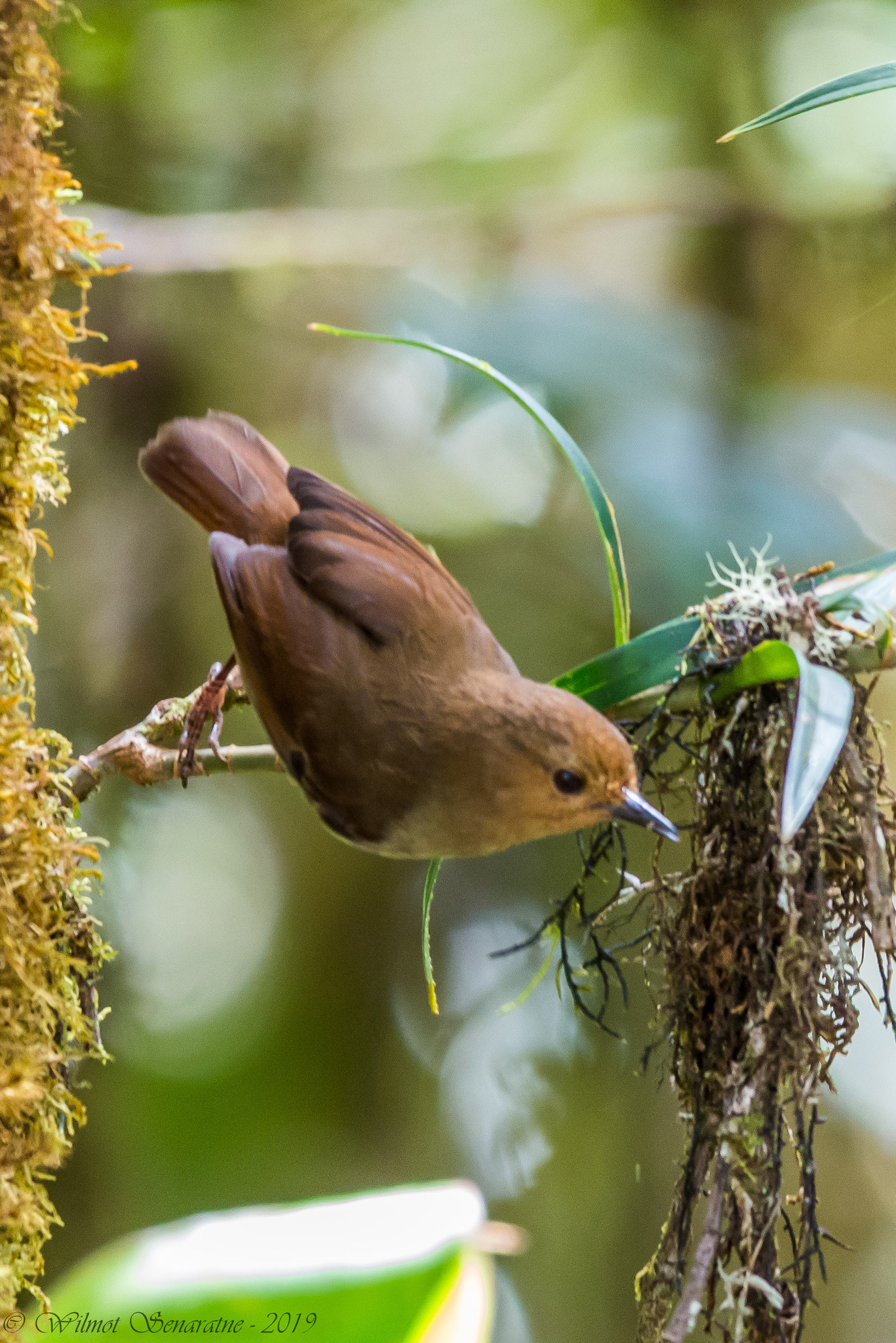

Conservation status
- Least Concern (IUCN 3.1)

Scientific classification
- Kingdom: Animalia
- Phylum: Chordata
- Class: Aves
- Order: Passeriformes
- Family: Acanthizidae
- Genus: Sericornis
- Species: S. nouhuysi

Binomial name
- Sericornis nouhuysi van Oort, 1909

= Large scrubwren =

Species of bird

The large scrubwren (Sericornis nouhuysi) is a bird species. Placed in the family Pardalotidae in the Sibley-Ahlquist taxonomy, this has met with opposition and indeed is now known to be wrong; they rather belong to the independent family Acanthizidae.

It is found in New Guinea. Its natural habitat is subtropical or tropical moist montane forests.

== Taxonomy ==
The large scrubwren was formally described in 1909 by the Dutch ornithologist Eduard Daniël van Oort based on a specimen collected in the Jayawijaya Mountains of western New Guinea by the Dutch explorer Hendrikus Albertus Lorentz. Van Oort considered the specimen to be a subspecies on the grey-green scrubwren (Aethomyias arfakianus) and coined the trinomial name Sericornis arfakiana nouhuysi. He chose the epithet nouhuysi to honour Jan Willem van Nouhuys, Lorentz's travelling companion.

Ten subspecies are recognised:

- S. n. cantans Mayr, 1930 – montane Bird south Head and Arfak Mts. (northwest New Guinea)
- S. n. nouhuysi van Oort, 1909 – montane central west New Guinea
- S. n. idenburgi Rand, 1941 – Gauttier Mountains and slopes above Idenburg River (northwest New Guinea)
- S. n. stresemanni Mayr, 1930 – montane central, central east New Guinea
- S. n. adelberti Pratt, 1982 – Adelbert Range (northeast New Guinea)
- S. n. oorti Rothschild & Hartert, EJO, 1913 – Huon Peninsula and Herzog Mountains (northeast New Guinea)
- S. n. monticola Mayr & Rand, 1936 – montane southeast New Guinea
- S. n. jobiensis Stresemann & Paludan, 1932 – Yapen (Geelvink Bay Islands, northwest New Guinea)
- S. n. pontifex Stresemann, 1921 – Victor Emanuel Mountains, Hunstein Range and Sepik Mountains (central north New Guinea)
- S. n. virgatus (Reichenow, 1915) – central north, northeast New Guinea (Bewani Mountains, Torricelli Mountains, Prince Alexander Mountains, and north slopes of Sepik-Ramu drainage. (includes boreonesioticus)

Subspecies S. n. virgatus, S. n. jobiensis and S. n. pontifex have sometimes been considered as a separate species, the perplexing scrubwren.
