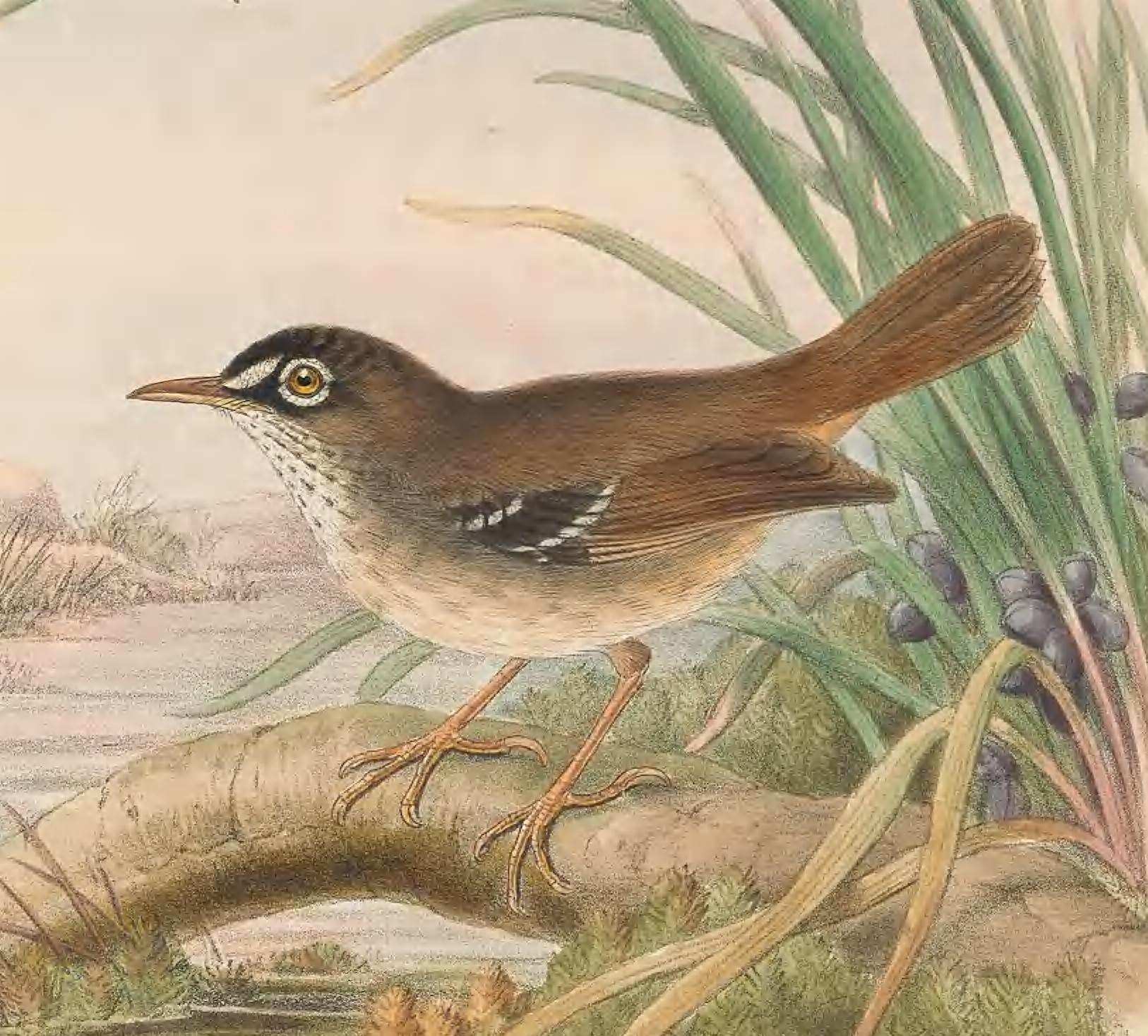
- Illustration by William Matthew Hart
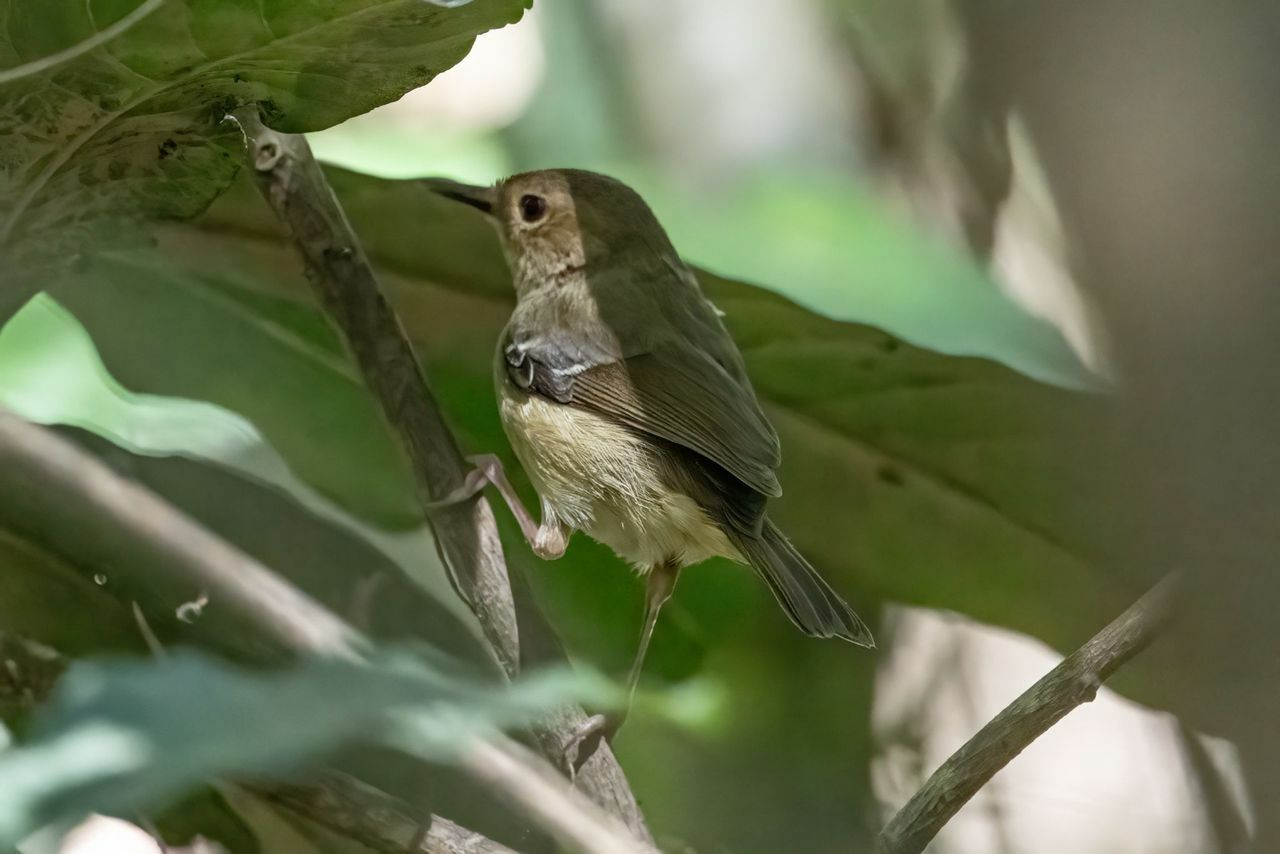

Conservation status
- Least Concern (IUCN 3.1)

Scientific classification
- Kingdom: Animalia
- Phylum: Chordata
- Class: Aves
- Order: Passeriformes
- Family: Acanthizidae
- Genus: Sericornis
- Species: S. beccarii

Binomial name
- Sericornis beccarii Salvadori, 1874

= Tropical scrubwren =

Species of bird

The tropical scrubwren or Beccari's scrubwren (Sericornis beccarii) is a bird species. Placed in the family Pardalotidae in the Sibley-Ahlquist taxonomy, this has met with opposition and indeed is now known to be wrong; they rather belong to the independent family Acanthizidae.

It is found in tropical moist forests of north-eastern Australia including Queensland, the Aru Islands and southern New Guinea.

== Taxonomy ==
Sericornis beccarii includes the following subspecies:

- S. b. wondiwoi – Mayr, 1937
- S. b. beccarii – Salvadori, 1874
- S. b. weylandi – Mayr, 1937
- S. b. idenburgi – Rand, 1941
- S. b. cyclopum – Hartert, 1930
- S. b. randi – Mayr, 1937
- S. b. minimus – Gould, 1875
- S. b. dubius – Mayr, 1937
