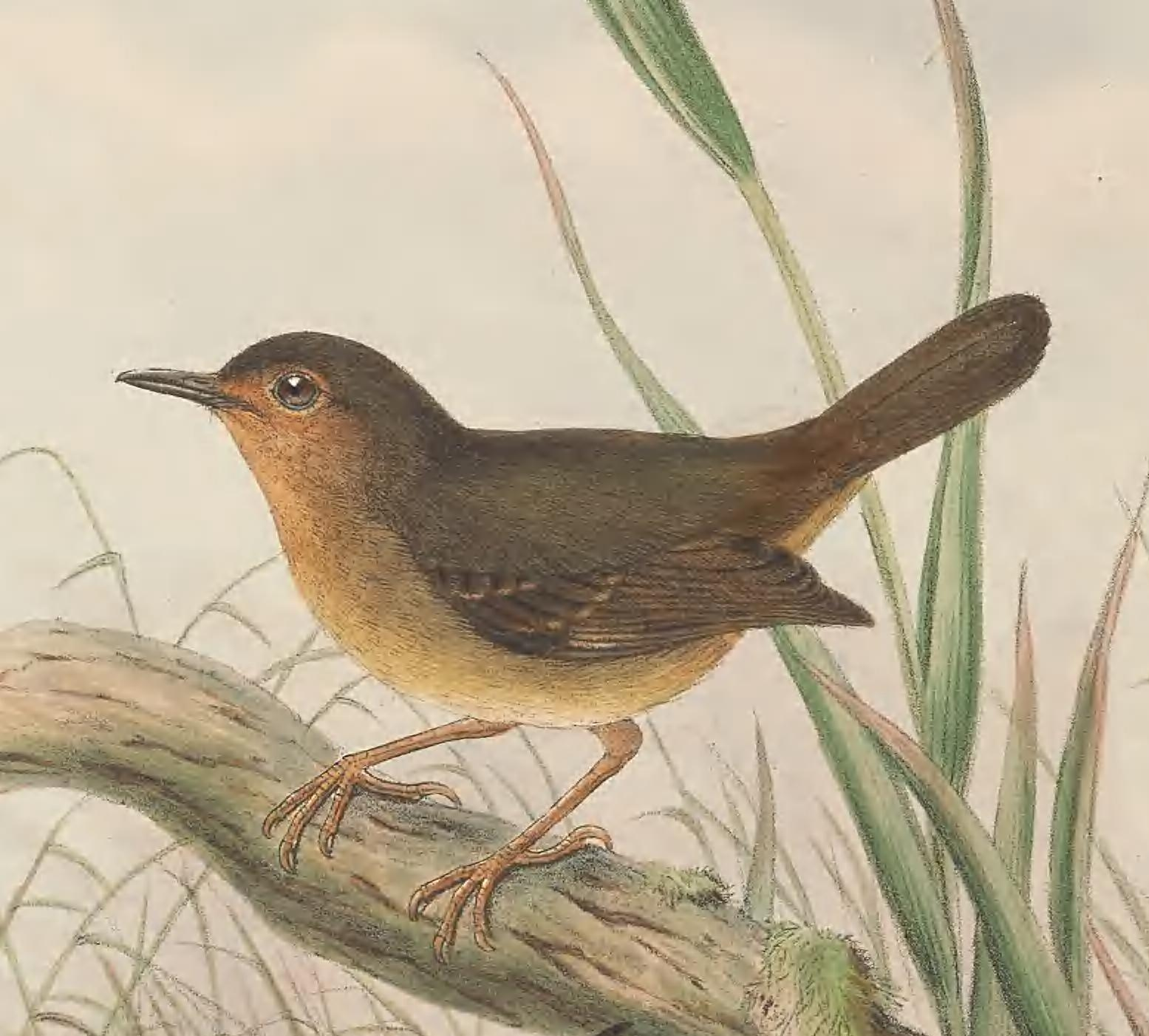
- Illustration by William Matthew Hart
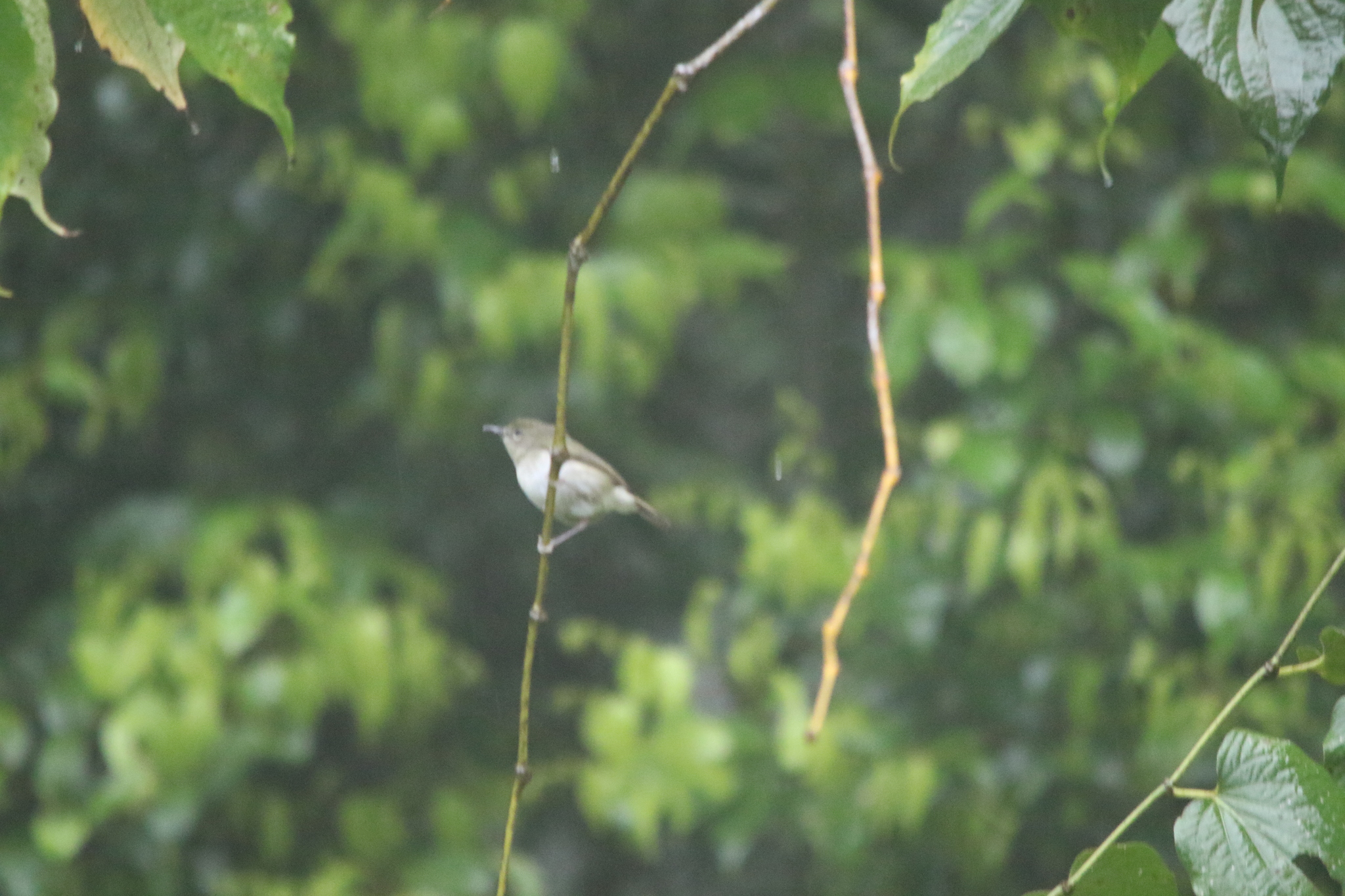

Conservation status
- Least Concern (IUCN 3.1)

Scientific classification
- Kingdom: Animalia
- Phylum: Chordata
- Class: Aves
- Order: Passeriformes
- Family: Acanthizidae
- Genus: Aethomyias
- Species: A. arfakianus

Binomial name
- Aethomyias arfakianus (Salvadori, 1876)

Synonyms
- Sericornis arfakianus

= Grey-green scrubwren =

Species of bird

The grey-green scrubwren (Aethomyias arfakianus) is a species of bird in the family Acanthizidae. It is found in the highlands of New Guinea; its natural habitat is subtropical or tropical montane forests.

This scrubwren was formerly placed in the genus Sericornis, but following the publication of a molecular phylogenetic study of the scrubwrens in 2018, it was moved to the resurrected genus Aethomyias.
