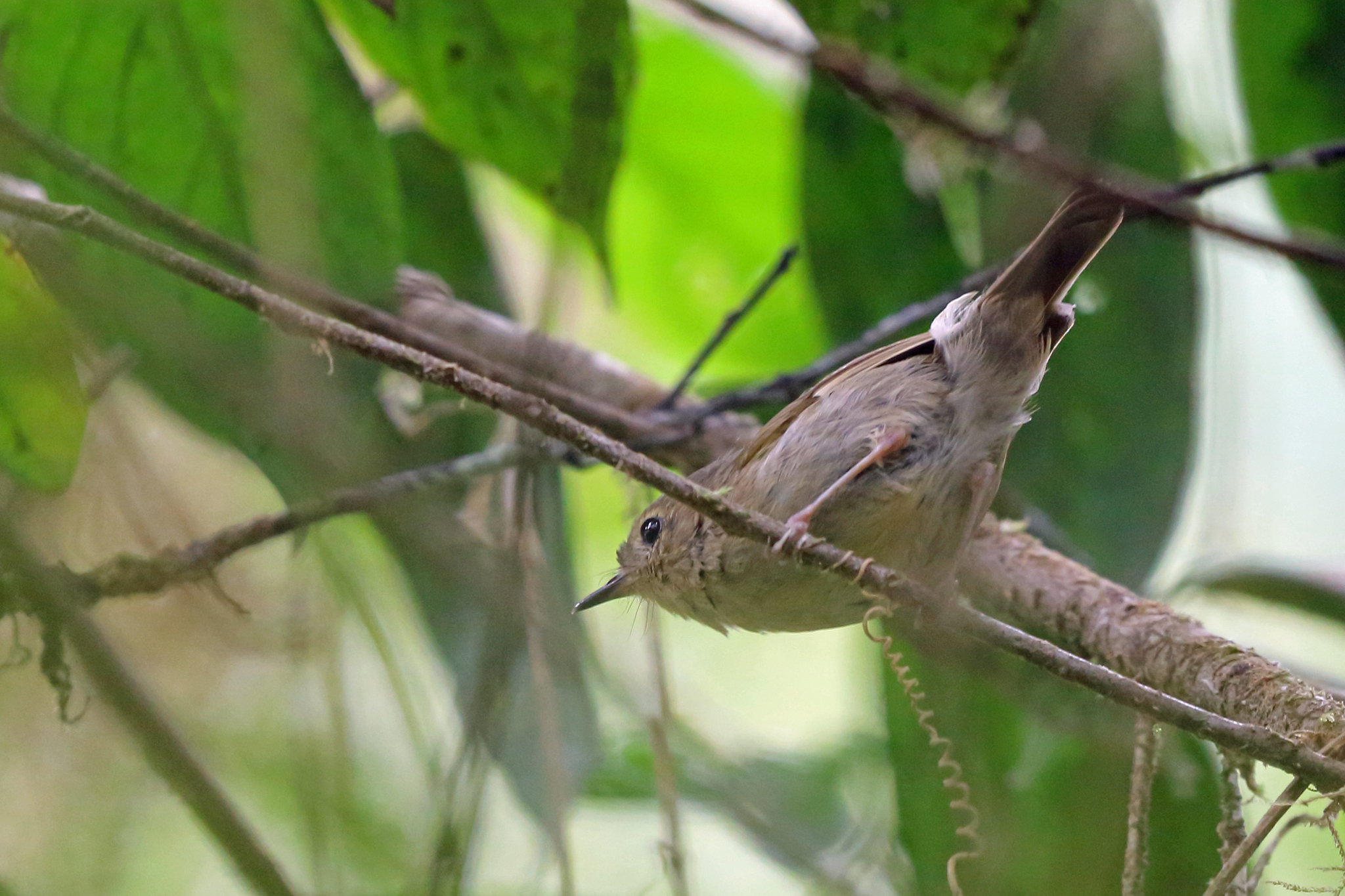

Conservation status
- Least Concern (IUCN 3.1)

Scientific classification
- Kingdom: Animalia
- Phylum: Chordata
- Class: Aves
- Order: Passeriformes
- Family: Acanthizidae
- Genus: Aethomyias
- Species: A. rufescens

Binomial name
- Aethomyias rufescens (Salvadori, 1876)

Synonyms
- Sericornis rufescens

= Vogelkop scrubwren =

Species of bird

The Vogelkop scrubwren (Aethomyias rufescens) is a bird species in the family Acanthizidae. It is endemic to West Papua, Indonesia. Its natural habitat is subtropical or tropical moist montane forests.

This species was formerly placed in the genus Sericornis but following the publication of a molecular phylogenetic study of the scrubwrens in 2018, it was moved to the resurrected genus Aethomyias.
