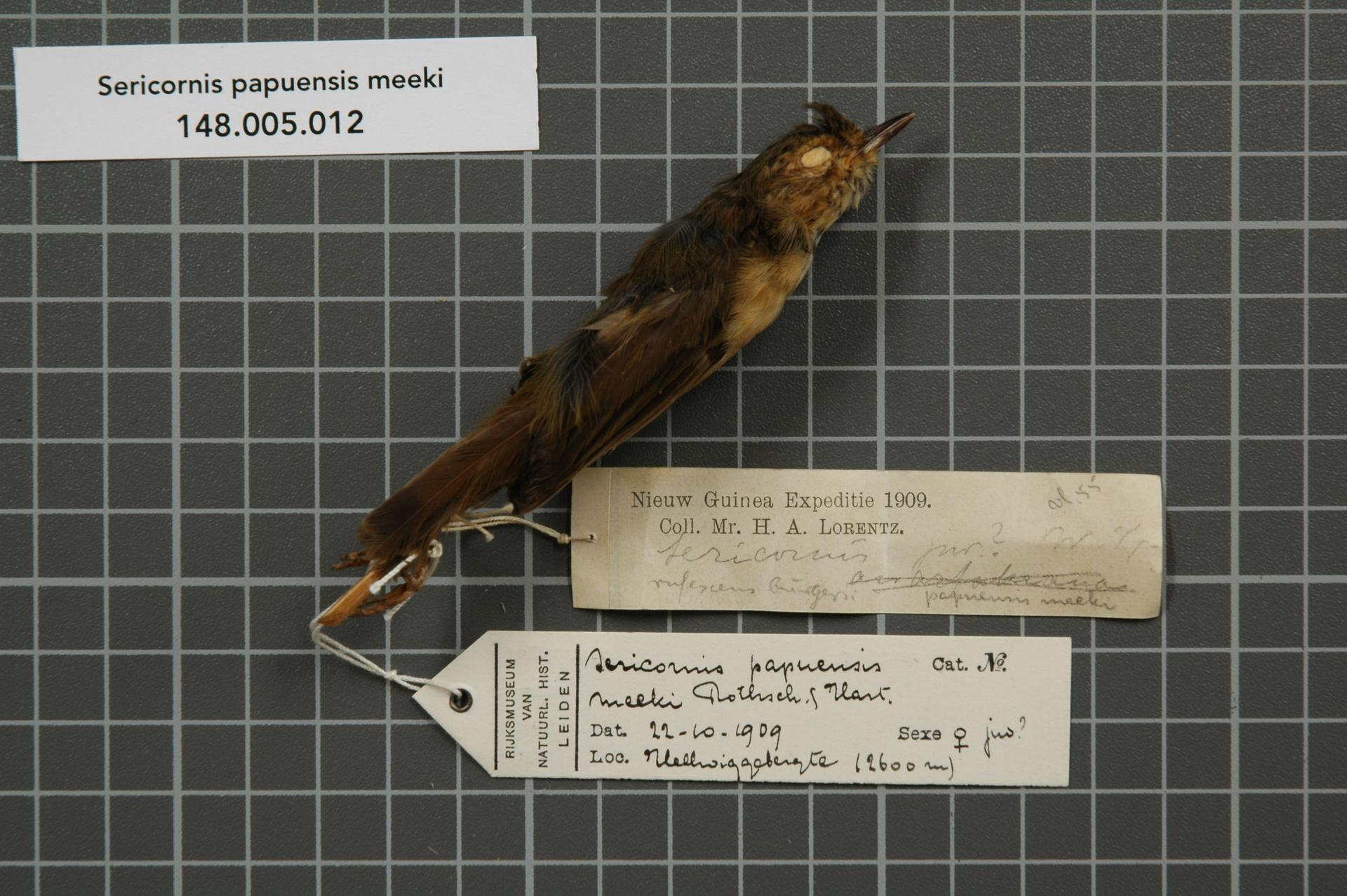

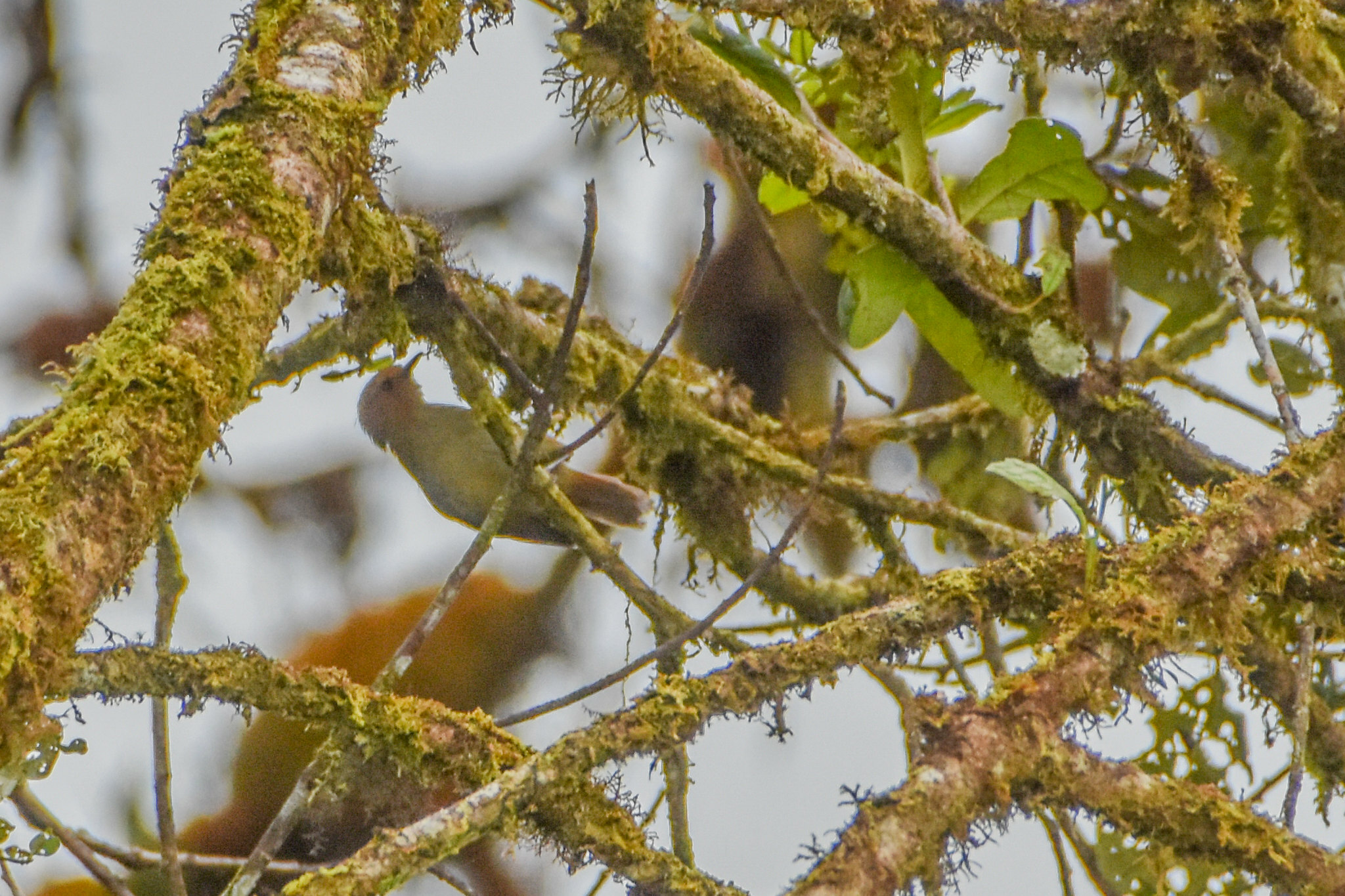

Conservation status
- Least Concern (IUCN 3.1)

Scientific classification
- Kingdom: Animalia
- Phylum: Chordata
- Class: Aves
- Order: Passeriformes
- Family: Acanthizidae
- Genus: Aethomyias
- Species: A. papuensis

Binomial name
- Aethomyias papuensis (De Vis, 1894)

Subspecies
- A. p. meeki - (Rothschild & Hartert, 1913); A. p. buergersi - (Stresemann, 1921); A. p. papuensis - (De Vis, 1894)

Synonyms
- Sericornis papuensis

= Papuan scrubwren =

Species of bird

The Papuan scrubwren (Aethomyias papuensis) is a species of bird in the family Acanthizidae. It is found in the highlands of New Guinea; its natural habitat is subtropical or tropical moist montane forests.

This species was formerly placed in the genus Sericornis but following the publication of a molecular phylogenetic study of the scrubwrens in 2018, it was moved to the resurrected genus Aethomyias.
