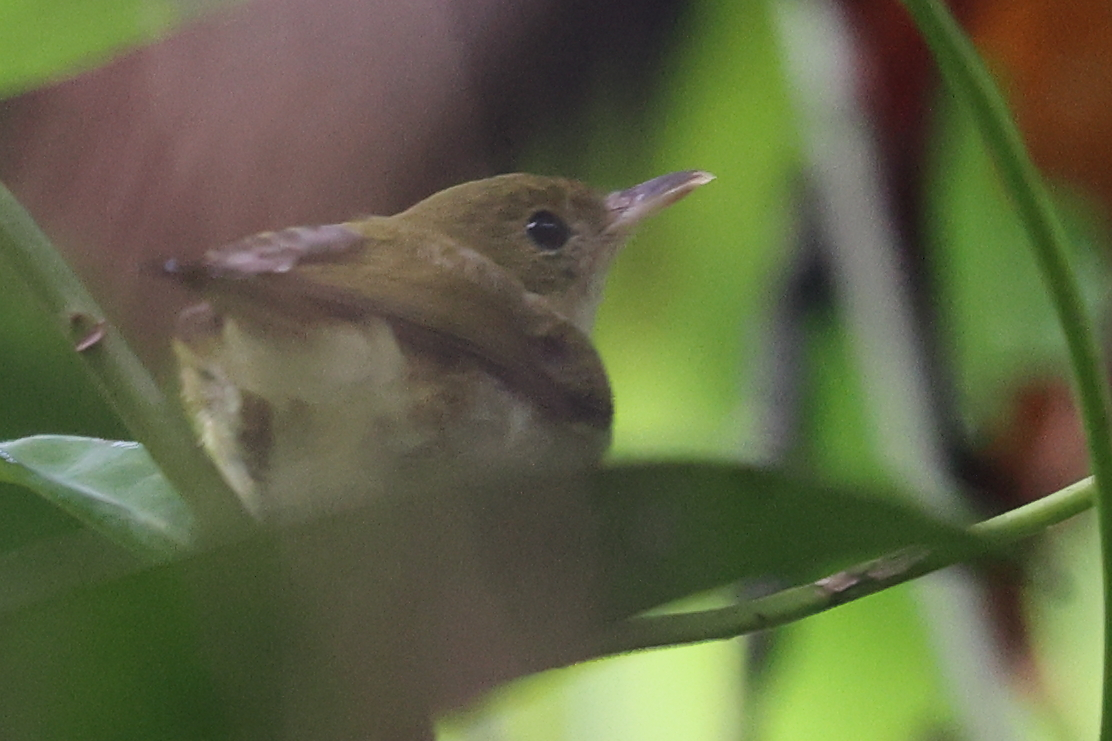

Conservation status
- Least Concern (IUCN 3.1)

Scientific classification
- Kingdom: Animalia
- Phylum: Chordata
- Class: Aves
- Order: Passeriformes
- Family: Acanthizidae
- Genus: Aethomyias
- Species: A. spilodera

Binomial name
- Aethomyias spilodera (Gray, 1859)

Subspecies
- A. s. ferrugineus - (Stresemann & Paludan, 1932); A. s. spilodera - (Gray, GR, 1859); A. s. granti - Hartert, 1930; A. s. guttatus - Sharpe, 1882; A. s. aruensis - (Ogilvie-Grant, 1911)

Synonyms
- Sericornis spilodera

= Pale-billed scrubwren =

Species of bird

The pale-billed scrubwren (Aethomyias spilodera) is a bird species in the family Acanthizidae. It is found in the Aru Islands and New Guinea. Its natural habitat is subtropical or tropical moist lowland forests.

This species was formerly placed in the genus Sericornis but following the publication of a molecular phylogenetic study of the scrubwrens in 2018, it was moved to the resurrected genus Aethomyias.
