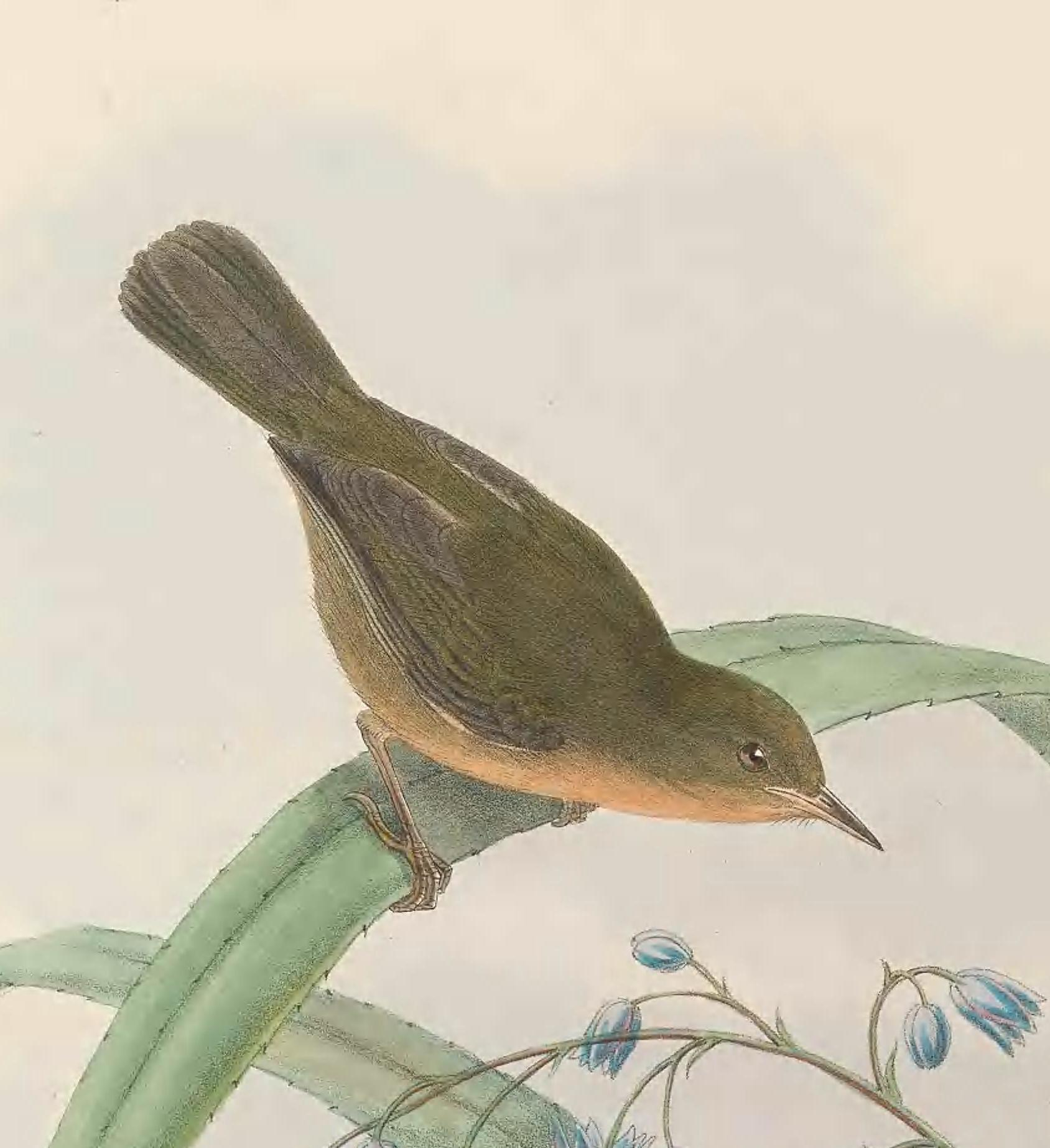
- Illustration by William Matthew Hart

Conservation status
- Least Concern (IUCN 3.1)

Scientific classification
- Kingdom: Animalia
- Phylum: Chordata
- Class: Aves
- Order: Passeriformes
- Family: Meliphagidae
- Genus: Timeliopsis
- Species: T. fulvigula

Binomial name
- Timeliopsis fulvigula (Schlegel, 1871)

= Olive straightbill =

Species of bird

The olive straightbill (Timeliopsis fulvigula) is a species of bird in the family Meliphagidae. It is found in the highlands of New Guinea. Its natural habitat is subtropical or tropical moist montane forests.
