= Tawny straightbill =

- Illustration by William Matthew Hart

Conservation status
- Least Concern (IUCN 3.1)

Scientific classification
- Kingdom: Animalia
- Phylum: Chordata
- Class: Aves
- Order: Passeriformes
- Family: Meliphagidae
- Genus: Timeliopsis
- Species: T. griseigula

Binomial name
- Timeliopsis griseigula (Schlegel, 1871)

Species of bird

The tawny straightbill (Timeliopsis griseigula) is a species of bird in the family Meliphagidae. It is found in New Guinea. Its natural habitat is subtropical or tropical moist lowland forests.
