= Bicolored scrubwren =

Bicolored mouse-warbler

Conservation status
- Least Concern (IUCN 3.1)

Scientific classification
- Kingdom: Animalia
- Phylum: Chordata
- Class: Aves
- Order: Passeriformes
- Family: Acanthizidae
- Genus: Aethomyias
- Species: A. nigrorufus

Binomial name
- Aethomyias nigrorufus (Salvadori, 1895)

Synonyms
- Crateroscelis nigrorufa

Species of bird

The bicolored scrubwren or bicolored mouse-warbler (Aethomyias nigrorufus) is a species of bird in the family Acanthizidae. It is found in the New Guinea Highlands; its natural habitat is subtropical or tropical moist montane forests.

This species was formerly placed in the genus Crateroscelis but following the publication of a molecular phylogenetic study of the scrubwrens and mouse-warblers in 2018, it was moved to the resurrected genus Aethomyias.
