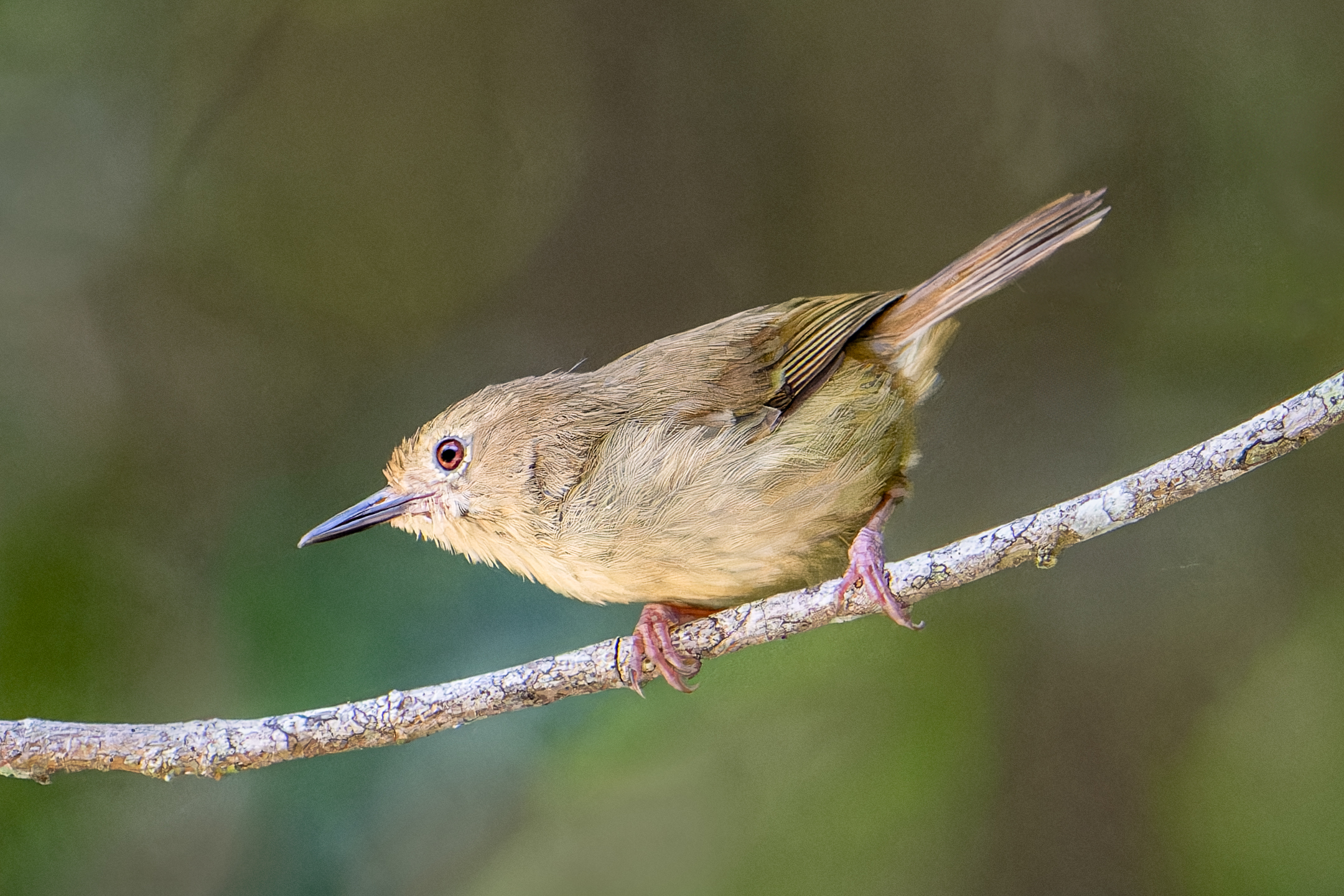
- at Lamington National Park, Queensland.

Conservation status
- Least Concern (IUCN 3.1)

Scientific classification
- Kingdom: Animalia
- Phylum: Chordata
- Class: Aves
- Order: Passeriformes
- Family: Acanthizidae
- Genus: Sericornis
- Species: S. magnirostra

Binomial name
- Sericornis magnirostra (Gould, 1838)

Subspecies
- S. m. viridior - Mathews, 1912; S. m. magnirostra - (Gould, 1838); S. m. howei - Mathews, 1912

Synonyms
- Sericornis magnirostris

= Large-billed scrubwren =

Species of bird

The large-billed scrubwren (Sericornis magnirostra) is a passerine bird in the family Acanthizidae, endemic to eastern Australia. It is found in denser undergrowth in temperate forest, subtropical or tropical moist lowland forest, and subtropical or tropical moist montane forest.

== Taxonomy ==
The large-billed scrubwren was described by ornithologist John Gould in 1838.

The generic name Sericornis derives from Ancient Greek serikos 'silk' and ornis 'bird'. The specific epithet derives from Latin magnus 'great' and rostrum 'bill'.

It was placed in the family Pardalotidae in the Sibley-Ahlquist taxonomy, but this has met with opposition and indeed is now known to be wrong. Instead, the large-billed scrubwren belongs to the independent family Acanthizidae.

There are three recognised subspecies: Sericornis magnirostra magnirostra, S. m. viridior, and S. m. howei.

== Description ==
The large-billed scrubwren is 11.5 to 13 cm (4.5 to 5.1 in) in length and weighs 10 g (0.35 oz). It has a dark reddish-brown eye in a pale buff face, with a longish, black bill inclined slightly upwards. The upperparts are light grey-brown with an olive tint, the throat is a pale buffy-white, the belly greyish, and the rump and tail light rufous-brown.

== Distribution and habitat ==
The large-billed scrubwren is found from near Cooktown in northern Queensland to Kinglake and the Dandenong Ranges, near Melbourne, Victoria. The distribution of the 3 subspecies corresponds to 3 discontinuous areas within its overall range: the nominate subspecies Sericornis magnirostra magnirostra is found from the Clarke Range, inland of Mackay, Queensland to East Gippsland in Victoria; S. m. viridior is found in northeast Queensland from Mt Amos, south of Cooktown, to the Paluma Range National Park, near Townsville; and S. m. howei is found in West Gippsland and the Strzelecki Ranges of southern Victoria. Its preferred habitat is rainforest in the tropics and wet sclerophyll forest in temperate areas. It is sedentary and more common in the north of its range.

== Behaviour ==
=== Breeding ===
The large-billed scrubwren breeds from July to January, mainly in November and December. It constructs a rough, domed nest of bark, grass and moss, lined with feathers and set in creepers, tree-ferns or palm-fronds. It often occupies the abandoned nest of other species, notably the yellow-throated scrubwren (Neosericornis citreogularis). A clutch of 3 or 4 eggs, measuring 19 mm × 15 mm (0.7 in × 0.6 in), is laid. The eggs are dull white to pale purplish-brown in appearance with fine spots at the large end. The incubation period is unknown and the nestling period is about 13 days. The nests are parasitised by the fan-tailed cuckoo (Cacomantis flabelliformis) and the chestnut-breasted cuckoo (C. castaneiventris).

=== Feeding ===
The large-billed scrubwren forages in the low to middle levels of the forest, often in small flocks. It is insectivorous, gleaning various arthropods, including spiders, ants, wasps, beetles, and lepidopteran larvae, from the bark of tree-trunks and branches, and amongst debris suspended in vines and epiphytes.

=== Vocalization ===
The large-billed scrubwren is mostly silent, but occasionally makes a penetrating territorial call "s-cheer s-cheer", a sharp, loud "chwip-chwip" or a chattering "sip-sip" while feeding.

== Conservation status ==
The large-billed scrubwren has a wide distribution and a stable population, and is classified as of least concern on the IUCN Red List.
