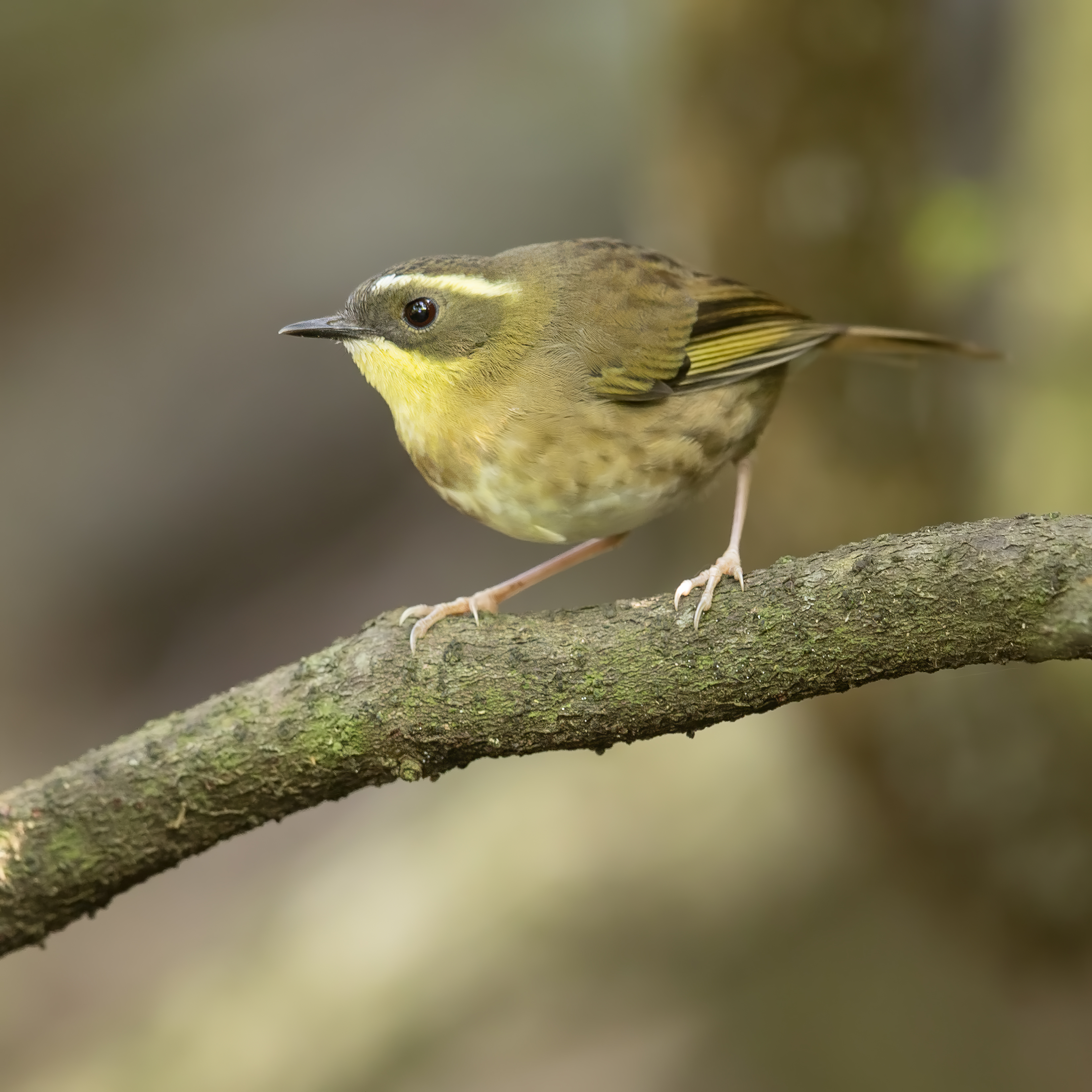

Conservation status
- Least Concern (IUCN 3.1)

Scientific classification
- Kingdom: Animalia
- Phylum: Chordata
- Class: Aves
- Order: Passeriformes
- Family: Acanthizidae
- Genus: Neosericornis; Mathews, 1912
- Species: N. citreogularis

Binomial name
- Neosericornis citreogularis (Gould, 1838)

Subspecies
- N. c. cairnsi - (Mathews, 1912); N. c. citreogularis - (Gould, 1838); N. c. intermedius - (Mathews, 1912)

Synonyms
- Sericornis citreogularis

= Yellow-throated scrubwren =

Species of bird

The yellow-throated scrubwren (Neosericornis citreogularis) is a passerine in the family Acanthizidae that is found in parts of eastern coastal Australia. It was formerly placed in the genus Sericornis, but is now the only species in the genus Neosericornis.

A small ground-dwelling bird that inhabits wet forest or rainforest, it is mainly insectivorous. The bird has a distinctive yellow throat and eyebrow. The male face is black and the female brown. The crown and upperparts are dark- to olive-brown, and the underparts cream, white or washed-out olive. The wings are dark brown and edged with yellow. Breeding twice or more in a long breeding season, it nests in large, suspended, pear-shaped structures. Often over water, they resemble flood debris, which they are often placed nearby. These nests are the preferred roosts of the golden-tipped bat (Phoniscus papuensis).

== Taxonomy ==
The yellow-throated scrubwren was described and illustrated by the English bird artist and ornithologist John Gould in 1838, and given the binomial name Sericornis citreogularis. The specific epithet is derived from the Latin terms cǐtreus 'pertaining to citrus' and gǔla 'throat', hence 'yellow-throated'. The northern subspecies cairnsii was described by amateur ornithologist Gregory Mathews in 1912. The yellow-throated scrubwren was formerly placed in the genus Sericornis but a phylogenetic analysis of mitochondrial DNA sequences published in 2018 found that the species was not closely related to other scrubwrens nor to the mouse-warblers. The species was therefore assigned to a separate genus Neosericornis, which had been proposed by Mathews in 1912. The generic name Neosericornis derives from the Ancient Greek neos 'new', serikos 'silken', and ornis 'bird'.

== Description ==
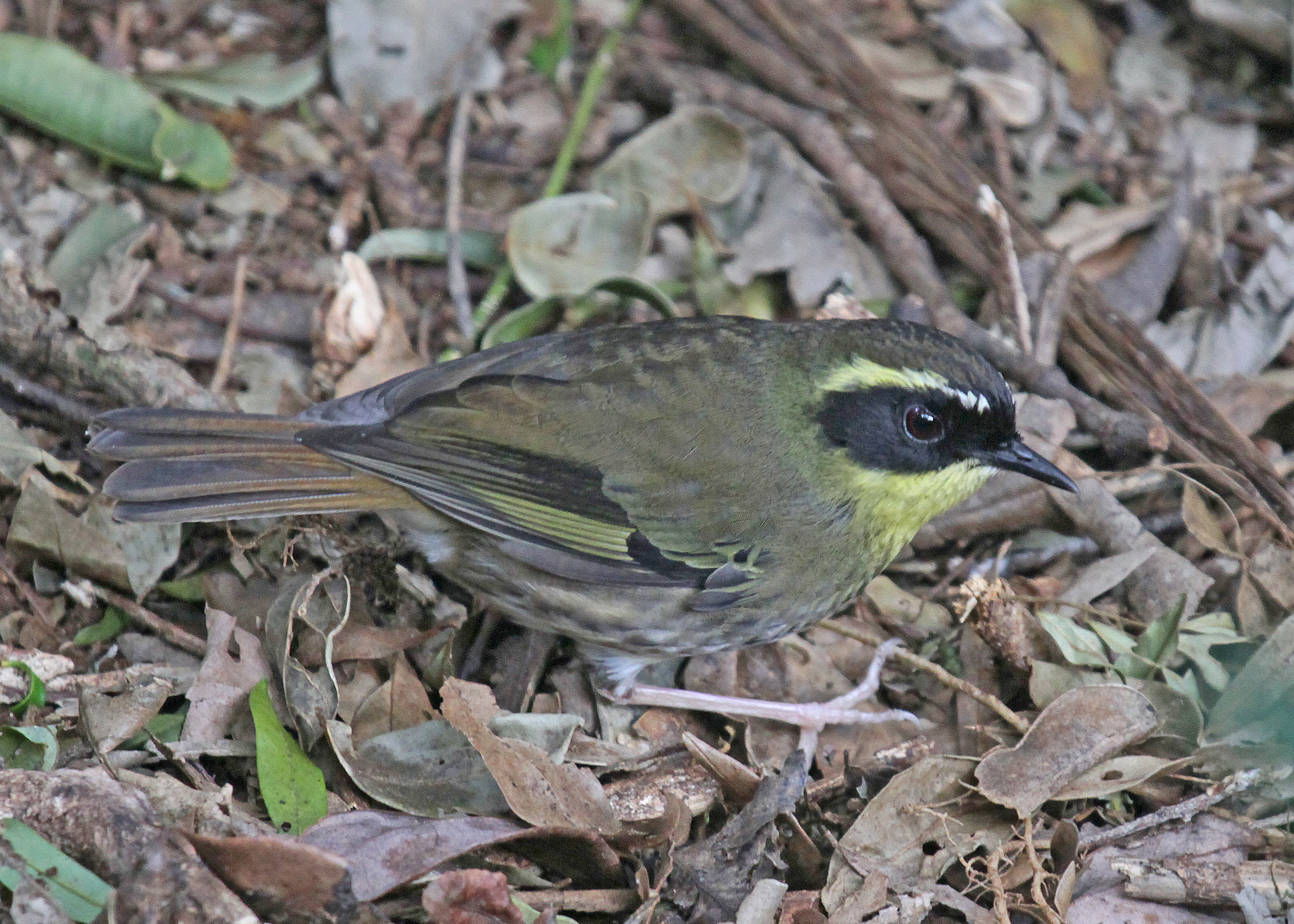
In Lamington National Park, Queensland, Australia

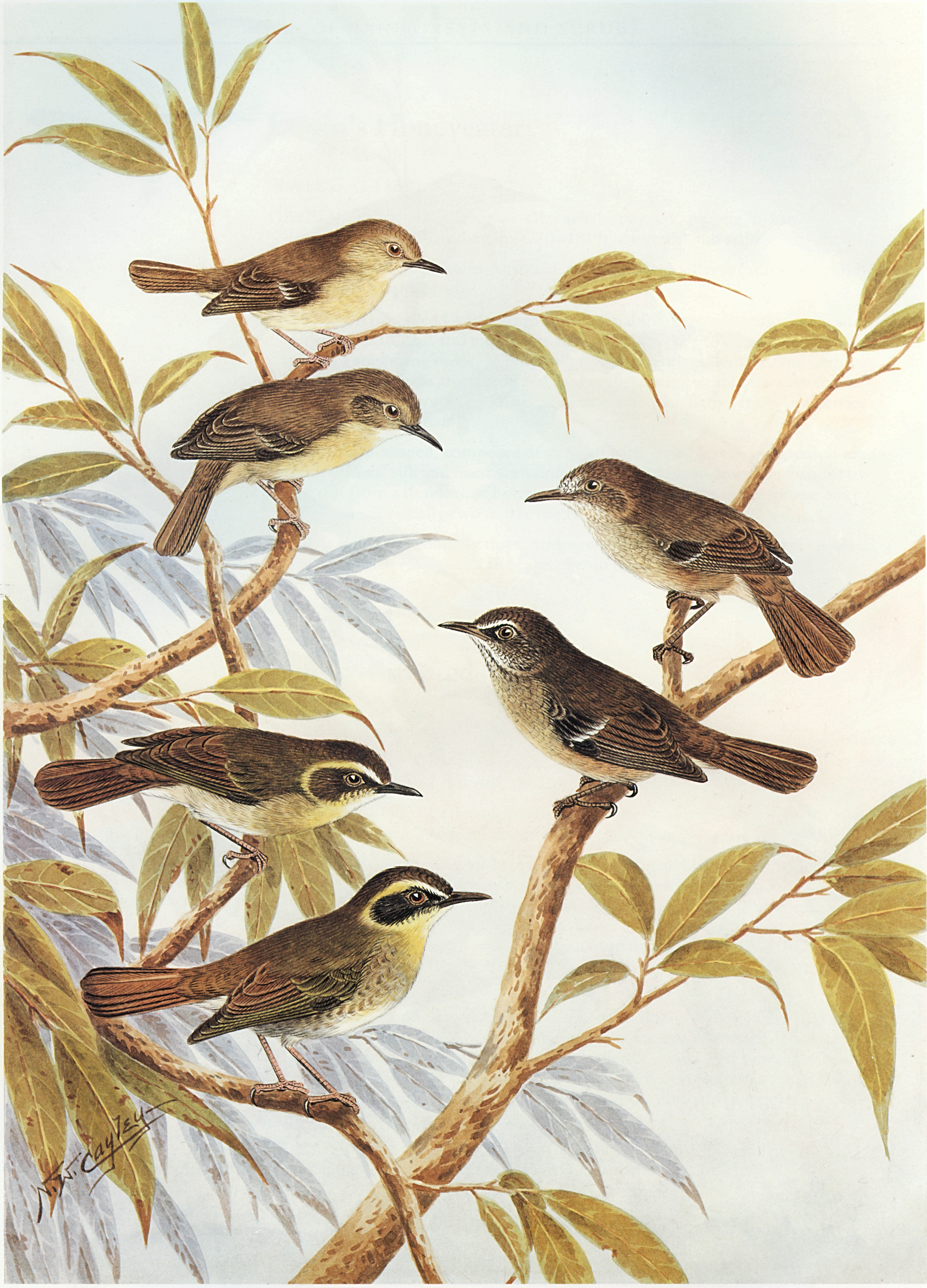
The scrubwrens by Neville William Cayley, including the yellow-throated scrubwrens on the bottom left.

The yellow-throated scrubwren measures 12.5–15 cm (5–6 in) in length. The male bird has a black masked face and ear coverts, with yellow throat and eyebrow. The iris is reddish and upperparts brownish and underparts paler. The wing primaries are yellow and relatively long legs pinkish or cream. The female has a brownish face. Calls include a loud harsh chatter, and a lively song, the latter can be a response to a loud noise such as a car door slamming.

== Distribution and habitat ==
Nest of the Yellow-throated scrubwren

The species is found in two disjunct distributions; in coastal north Queensland from Cooktown to Townsville, and from Hervey Bay in southern coastal Queensland south through to southeastern New South Wales. The usual habitat is rainforest gullies, generally with streams nearby. In the Sydney Basin this may be the Illawarra escarpment, and wetter places in the Dharug- and Royal National Parks.

Insectivorous, they feed at ground level, unlike the related large-billed scrubwren (S. magnirostris) which lives in the same wet forest habitat but forages higher in the leaf layer and on branches.

== Breeding ==
Breeding season can extend from June to March, with two or more broods laid in a season. The nest is a large structure of long pieces of dried grasses and leaves, sticks, palm fibre, bark, and ferns and feathers for lining. Pear-shaped, it hangs above the ground or water, suspended from a vine or branch. It may be mistaken for flood debris and is often constructed near it. A clutch of two or three tapered oval 26 mm × 18 mm (1.0 in × 0.7 in) eggs is laid; they vary from brownish-purple to pale brownish-white with darker spots or blotches. There is a cap of darker colour at the large end of the eggs.

The nest may be expanded in subsequent years by the birds adding an extra chamber onto it. They also appear to be the preferred daytime roosting sites of the golden-tipped bat (Phoniscus papuensis).
