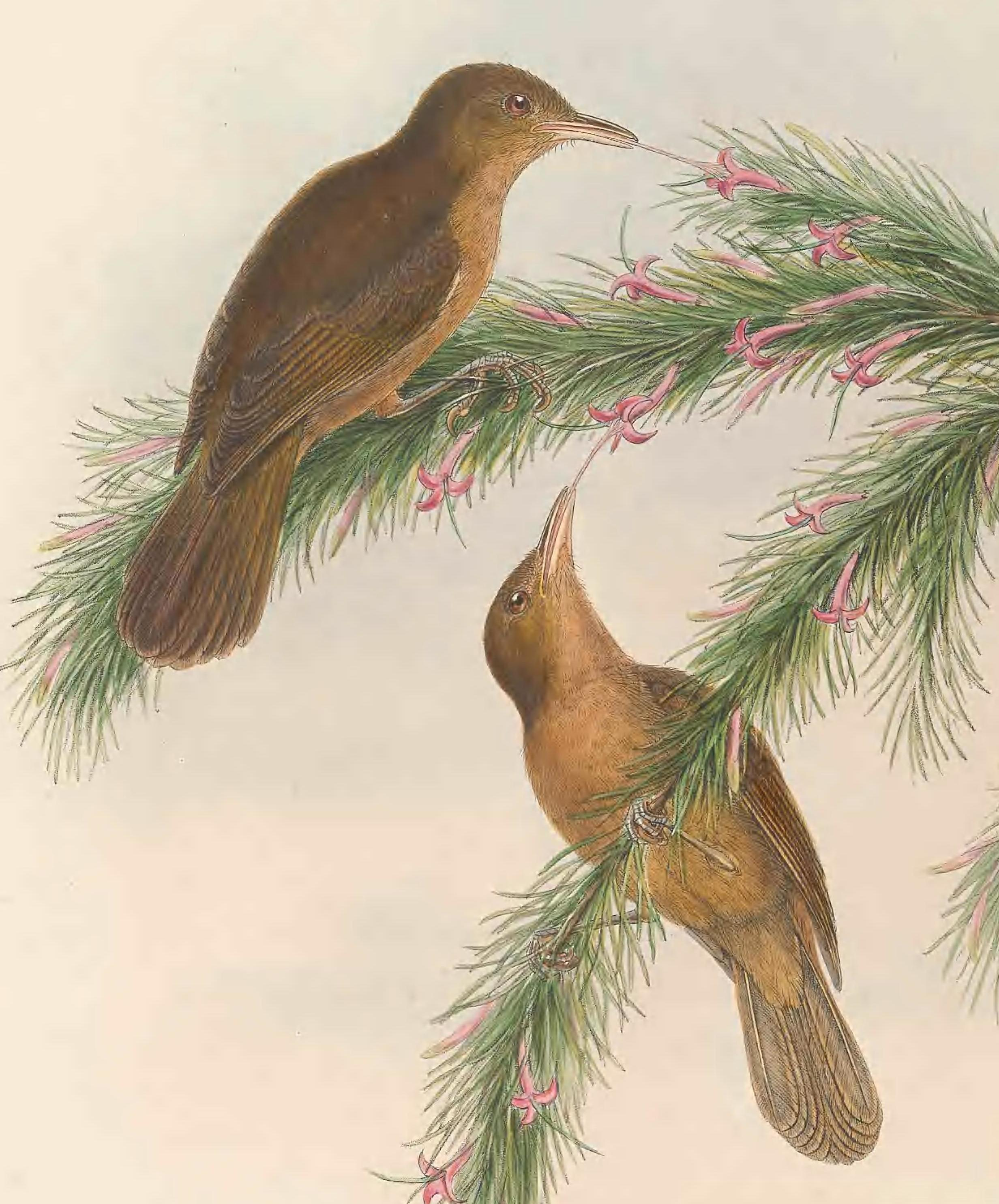
- Illustration of Tawny straightbill (Timeliopsis griseigula), the type species for the genus

Scientific classification
- Kingdom: Animalia
- Phylum: Chordata
- Class: Aves
- Order: Passeriformes
- Family: Meliphagidae
- Genus: Timeliopsis; Salvadori, 1876

Type species
- Timeliopsis trachycoma Salvadori, 1876

= Timeliopsis =

Genus of birds

Timeliopsis is a genus of bird in the family Meliphagidae. It contains the following species:

Image	Name	Common name
	Timeliopsis fulvigula	Olive straightbill
	Timeliopsis griseigula	Tawny straightbill
