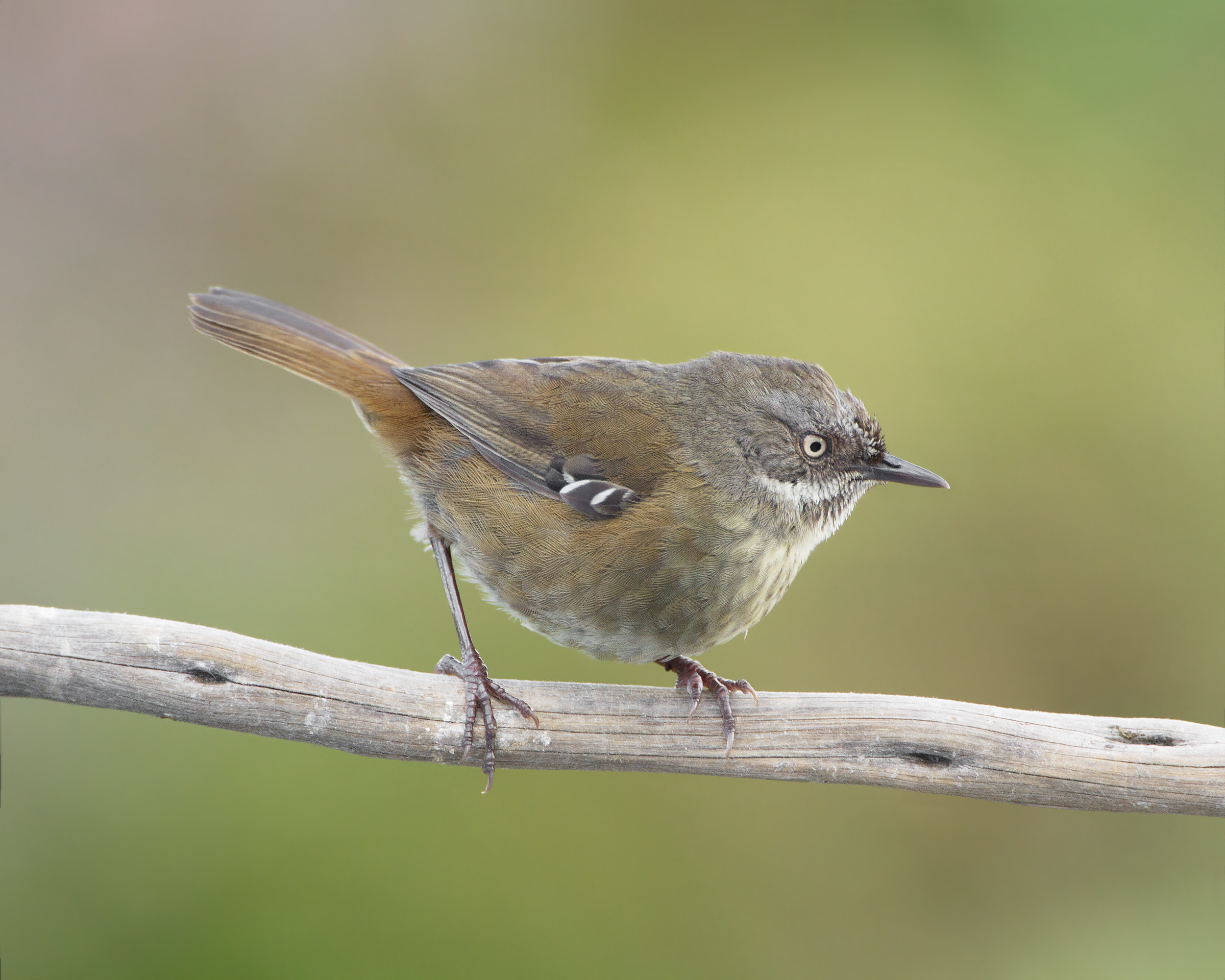
- In Tasmania

Conservation status
- Least Concern (IUCN 3.1)

Scientific classification
- Kingdom: Animalia
- Phylum: Chordata
- Class: Aves
- Order: Passeriformes
- Family: Acanthizidae
- Genus: Sericornis
- Species: S. humilis

Binomial name
- Sericornis humilis Gould, 1838

Subspecies
- S. h. tregellasi - (Mathews, 1914); S. h. humilis - Gould, 1838
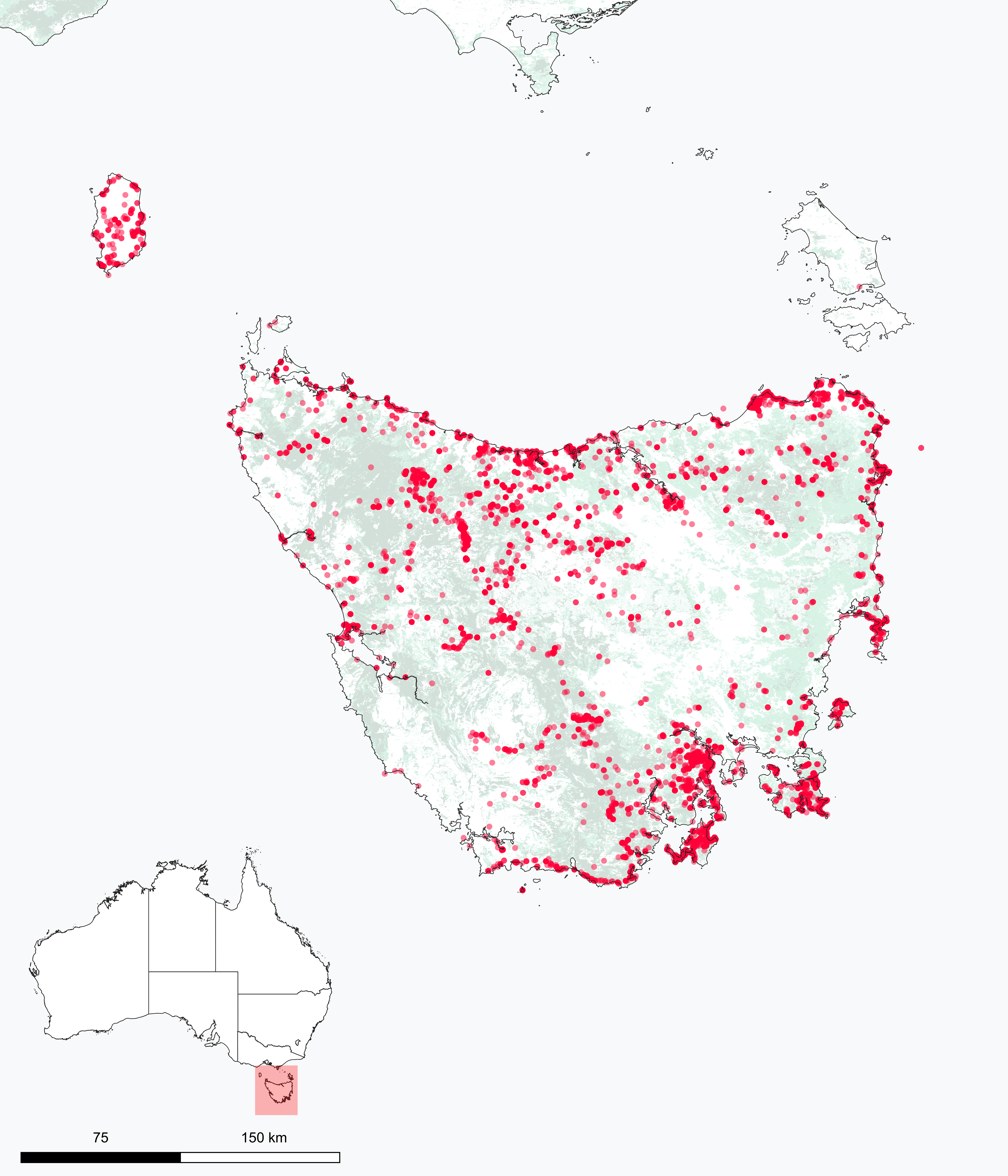

= Tasmanian scrubwren =

Species of bird

The Tasmanian scrubwren or brown scrubwren (Sericornis humilis) is a bird species endemic to the temperate forests of Tasmania and nearby King Island. It lives in the understory of rainforest, woodland, dry forest, swamps and coastal scrublands.

== Taxonomy ==
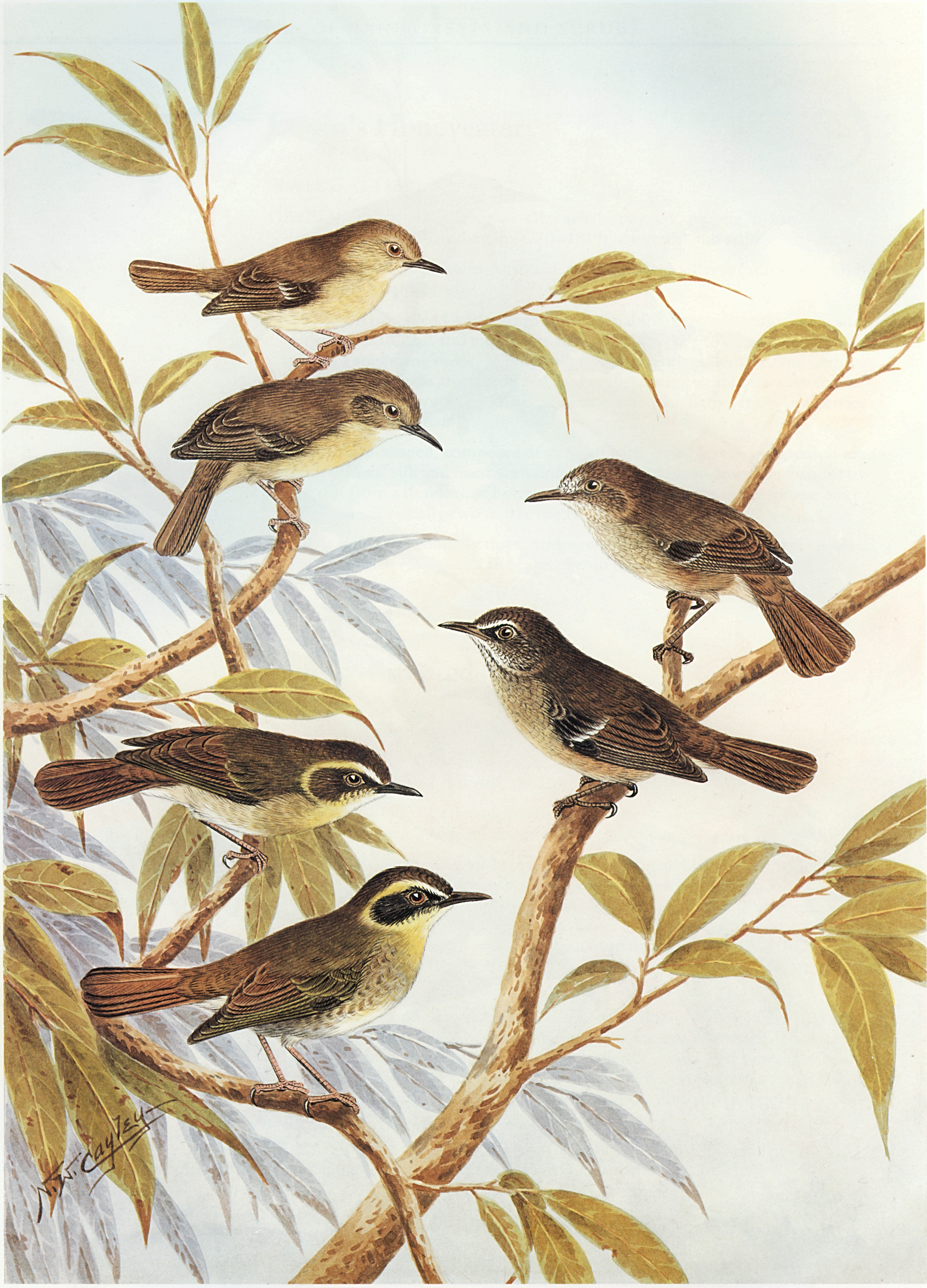
The scrubwrens by Neville William Cayley, including S. humilis on the right.

Placed in the family Pardalotidae in the Sibley-Ahlquist taxonomy, this has met with opposition and indeed is now no longer accepted; they instead are currently placed in the independent family Acanthizidae. It is alternately considered a subspecies of the smaller white-browed scrubwren, and further research is needed to understand the relationships between the two species.

== Subspecies ==
There are two subspecies of Tasmanian scrubwren:

- S. h. humilis – nominate subspecies; Tasmania
- S. h. tregellasi – King Island
