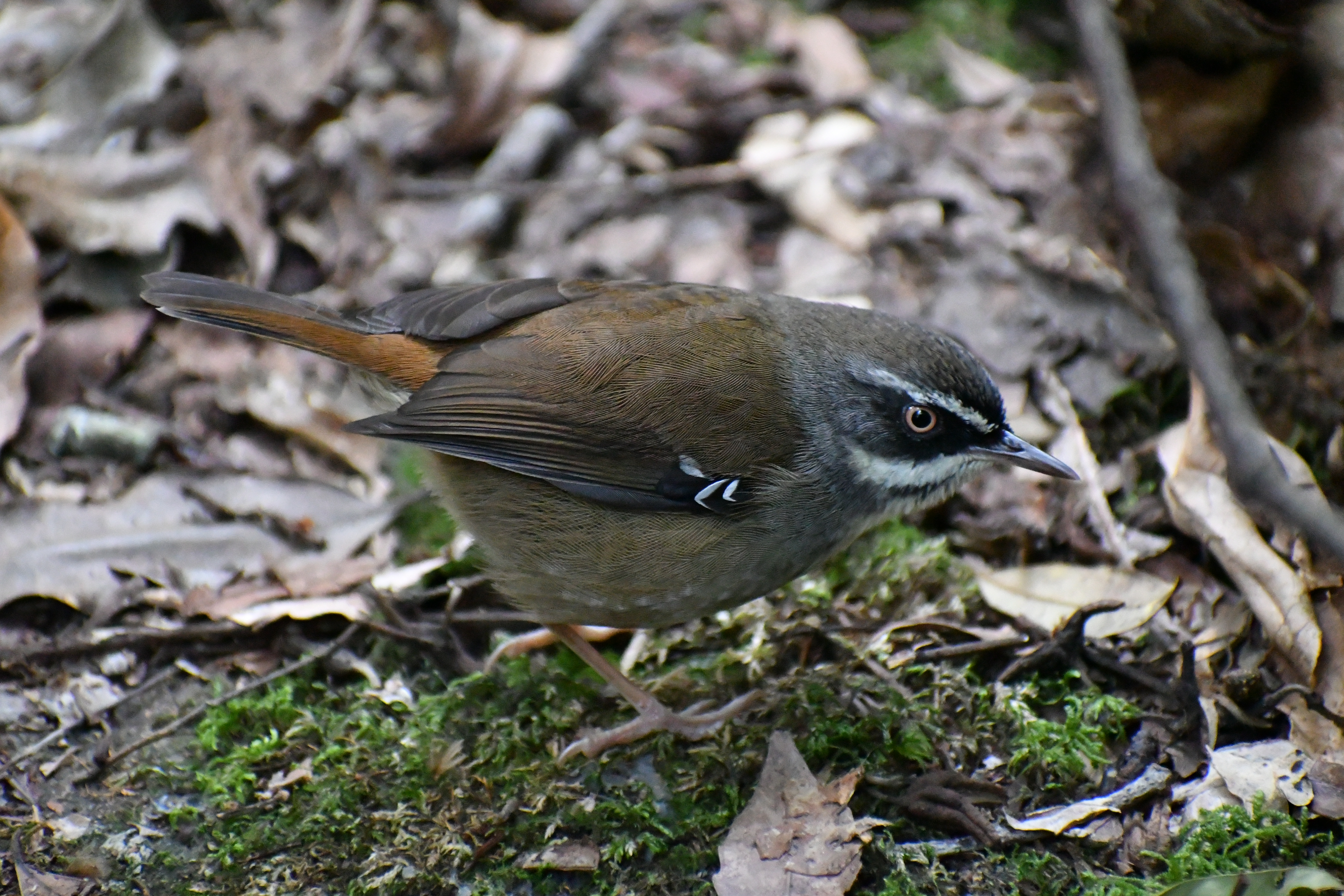

Conservation status
- Least Concern (IUCN 3.1)

Scientific classification
- Kingdom: Animalia
- Phylum: Chordata
- Class: Aves
- Order: Passeriformes
- Family: Acanthizidae
- Genus: Sericornis
- Species: S. frontalis

Binomial name
- Sericornis frontalis (Vigors & Horsfield, 1827)

= White-browed scrubwren =

Species of bird

The white-browed scrubwren (Sericornis frontalis) is a passerine bird found on the New England Tablelands and coastal areas of Australia. Placed in the family Pardalotidae in the Sibley-Ahlquist taxonomy, this has met with opposition and indeed is now known to be wrong; they rather belong to the independent family Acanthizidae.

It is insectivorous and inhabits undergrowth, from which it rarely ventures, though can be found close to urban areas. It is 11–14 cm (4.3–5.5 in) long and predominantly brown in colour with prominent white brows and pale eyes, though the three individual subspecies vary widely. Found in small groups, it is sedentary and engages in cooperative breeding. The larger Tasmanian scrubwren was formerly considered a subspecies of this species.

== Taxonomy ==
The white-browed scrubwren was originally described by naturalists Nicholas Aylward Vigors and Thomas Horsfield in 1827. The specific epithet frontalis derived from the Latin frons "eyebrow". It is now divided into two subspecies:

- S. f. frontalis, known as the white-browed scrubwren, is found in coastal eastern Australia from the New South Wales-Queensland border round to Adelaide in South Australia.
- S. f. laevigaster, known as the buff-breasted scrubwren, is found in coastal Queensland from the New South Wales border north to the Atherton Tableland.

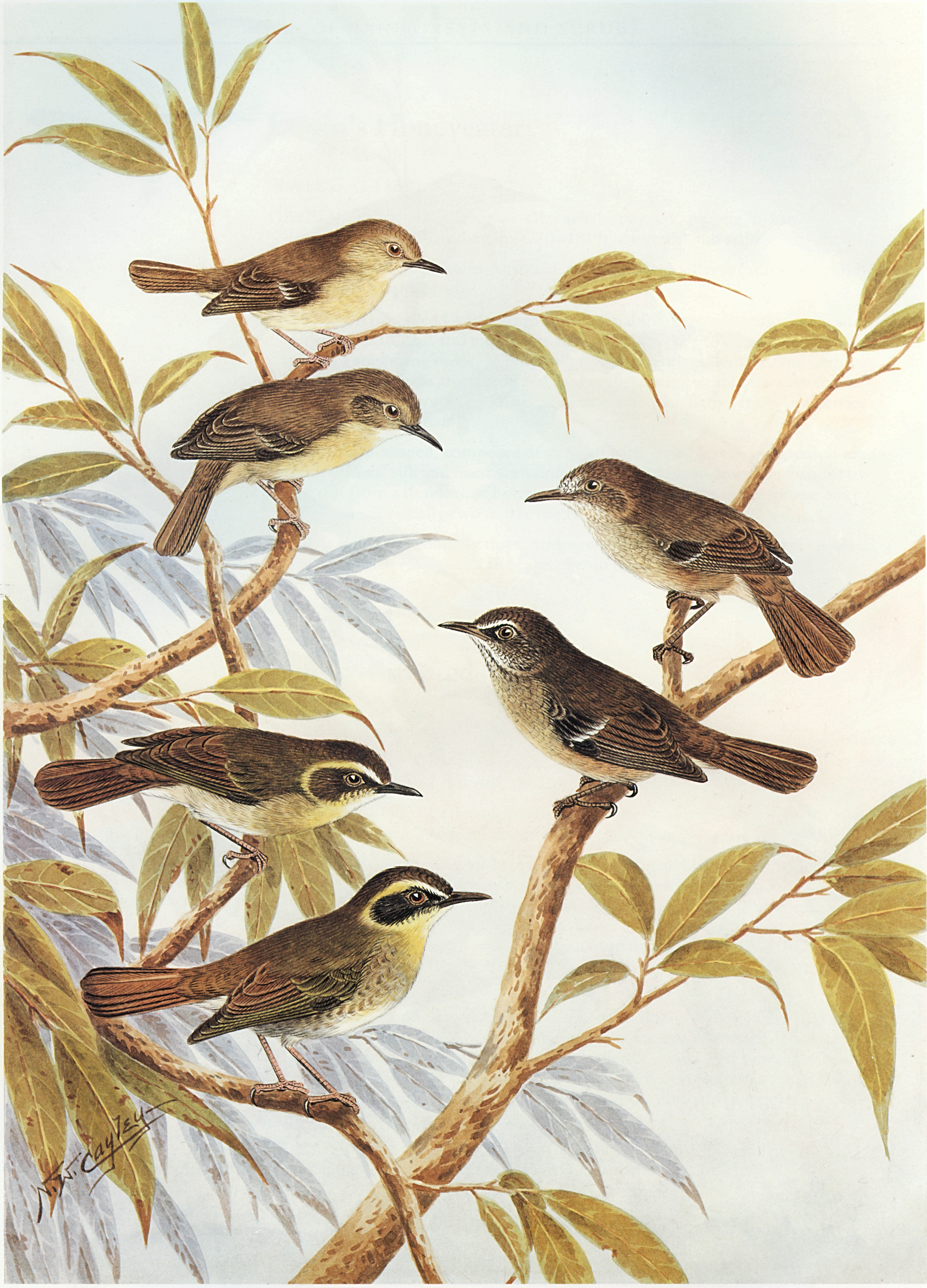
The scrubwrens by Neville William Cayley, including S. humilis on the right.

S. humilis, the Tasmanian scrubwren, is found in Tasmania and Bass Strait islands and was formerly considered a subspecies of the white-browed scrubwren. It is larger at 13.5 cm long and lays larger eggs.

S. maculatus, known as the spotted scrubwren, occurs in coastal southern Australia, from Kangaroo Island and Adelaide westwards to Shark Bay in Western Australia. It is known to intergrade with the nominate subspecies where their ranges overlap. Genetic analysis in a 2018 study of the family found that this taxon was more divergent from S. f. frontalis than the Tasmanian or Atherton scrubwrens and hence proposed its reclassification as a species. It was reclassified as a species in 2019.

== Description ==
Mainland birds measure 11.5 cm (4 1/2 in) in length and olive brown upperparts (greyish brown in the spotted subspecies and dark brown in Tasmania), with prominent pale irises and a white brow. The throat is white with faint streaks in the subspecies frontalis and laevigaster and heavily spotted in maculatus. Ear coverts are grey in frontalis and black in laevigaster, and brownish in the other two subspecies. The underparts are pale, though buff in laevigaster. The thin bill is black. The females are duller overall and generally have pale gray lores, whereas males have blackish lores. This allows most individuals to be reliably sexed in the field. The call is a loud high-pitched ts-cheer or ch-weip, ch-weip, ch-weip.

== Distribution and habitat ==
The species favours forested or scrubby areas with plentiful undergrowth, from which it rarely ventures. It is a common bird in bushland areas around Sydney, and the New England Tablelands. It is sedentary.

== Behaviour ==
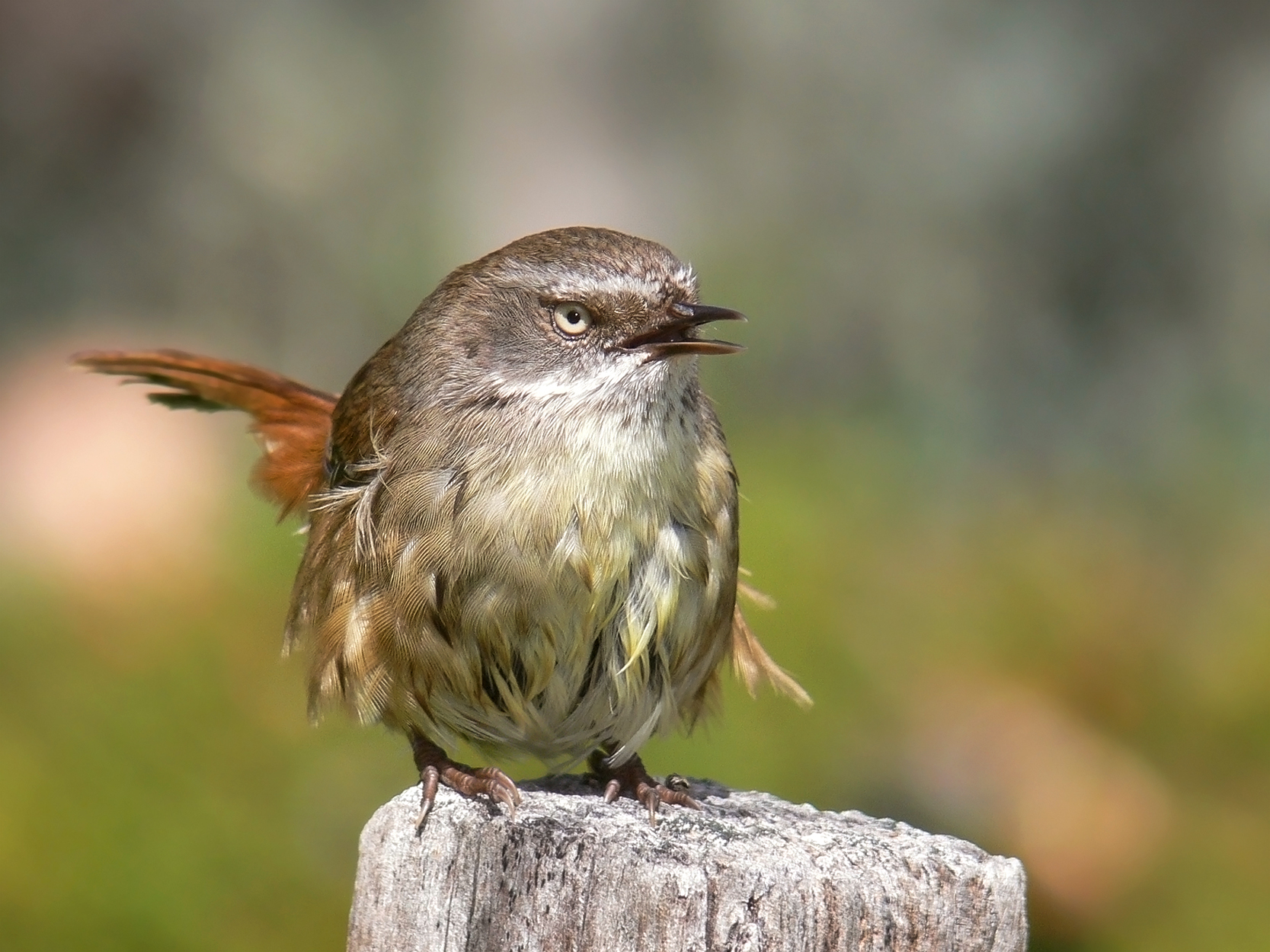
Female of race frontalis calling

Scrubwrens are predominantly insectivorous. They can be hard to spot but are very vocal and easy to localise. They occur in small groups of up to six birds and engage in cooperative breeding; namely that group members all help to feed and rear the young.

== Reproduction ==
Breeding season is June or July to November or December, with the nest a domelike structure of dried grasses and leaves, sticks, bark and ferns and feathers for lining. It is placed near or on the ground in dense cover. A clutch of two or three 20 x 15 mm eggs is laid; they vary from brownish-violet to brownish-white in colour with darker spots or blotches. The Tasmanian scrubwren lays larger eggs some 23 x 17 mm in dimensions.
