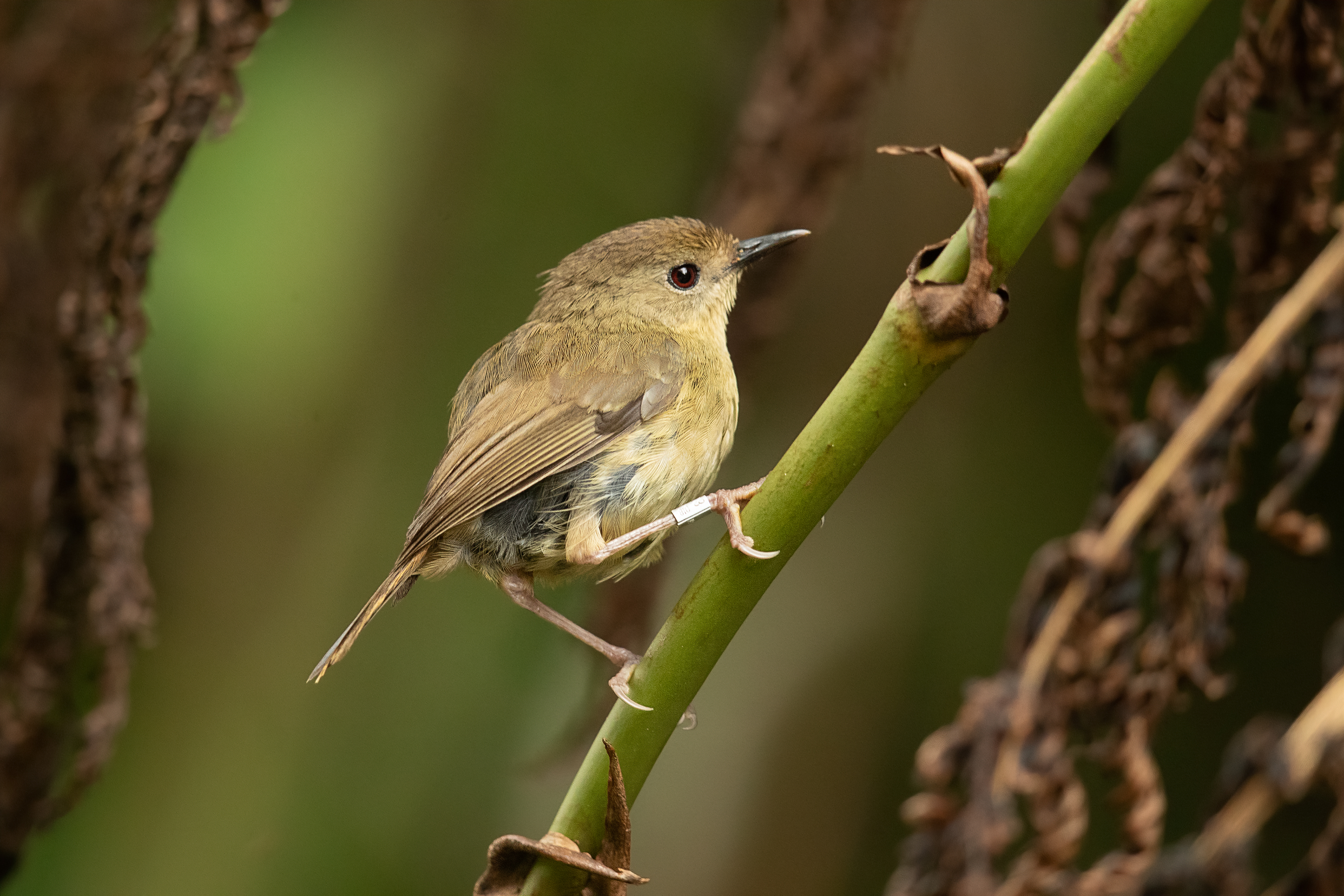

Conservation status
- Vulnerable (IUCN 3.1)

Scientific classification
- Kingdom: Animalia
- Phylum: Chordata
- Class: Aves
- Order: Passeriformes
- Family: Acanthizidae
- Genus: Sericornis
- Species: S. keri

Binomial name
- Sericornis keri Mathews, 1920
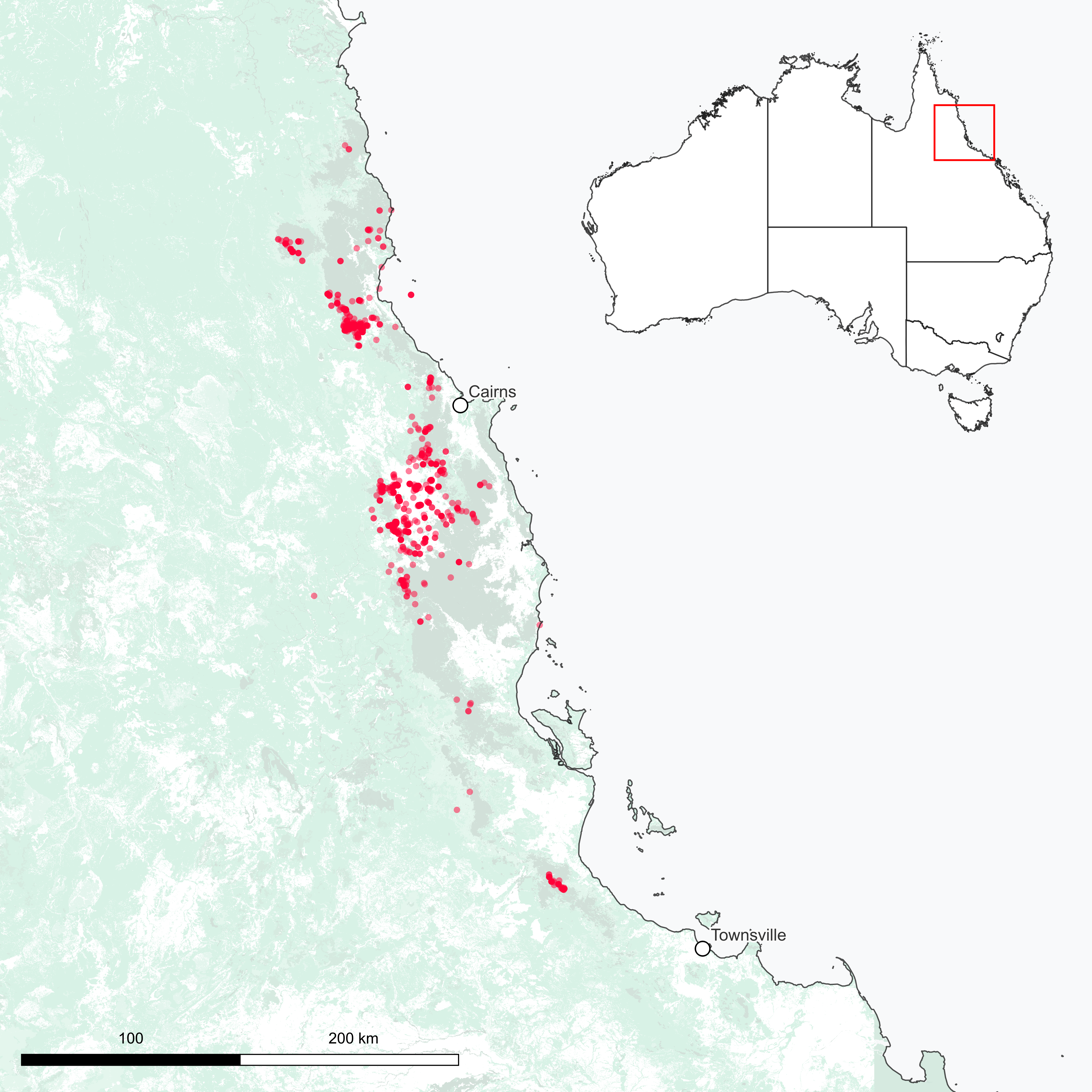
- Species distribution

= Atherton scrubwren =

Species of bird

The Atherton scrubwren (Sericornis keri) is a bird species. Placed in the family Pardalotidae in the Sibley-Ahlquist taxonomy, this has met with opposition and indeed is now known to be wrong; they rather belong to the independent family Acanthizidae.

It is endemic to Queensland (south-eastern coasts of Cape York Peninsula). Its natural habitats are subtropical or tropical moist lowland forests and subtropical or tropical moist montane forests.
