= William Matthew Hart =

English painter

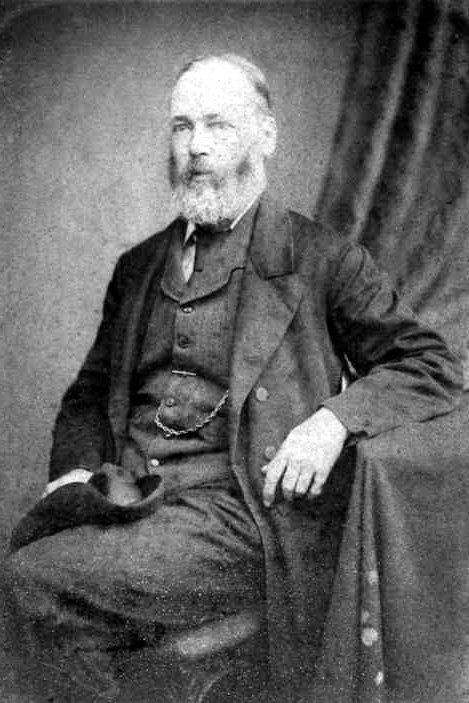
- Born: 1830; Limerick, Ireland
- Died: 1908 (aged 77–78); Camberwell, London
- Occupations: Illustrator and lithographer

William Matthew Hart (1830-1908) was an Irish-born English bird illustrator and lithographer who worked for John Gould.

Hart started medical training, but was unable to complete his studies for financial reasons. He began working for Gould in 1851, beginning an association that was to last thirty years. Early during this period he made the patterns for the lithographic plates for Gould's work on hummingbirds, as well as working on The Birds of Great Britain with Henry Constantine Richter. By 1870, Hart had become Gould's chief artist and lithographer. After Gould's death in 1881, Hart was employed by Richard Bowdler Sharpe of the British Museum to complete Gould's work on the birds of New Guinea and to produce illustrations for Sharpe's monograph on the birds-of-paradise.
