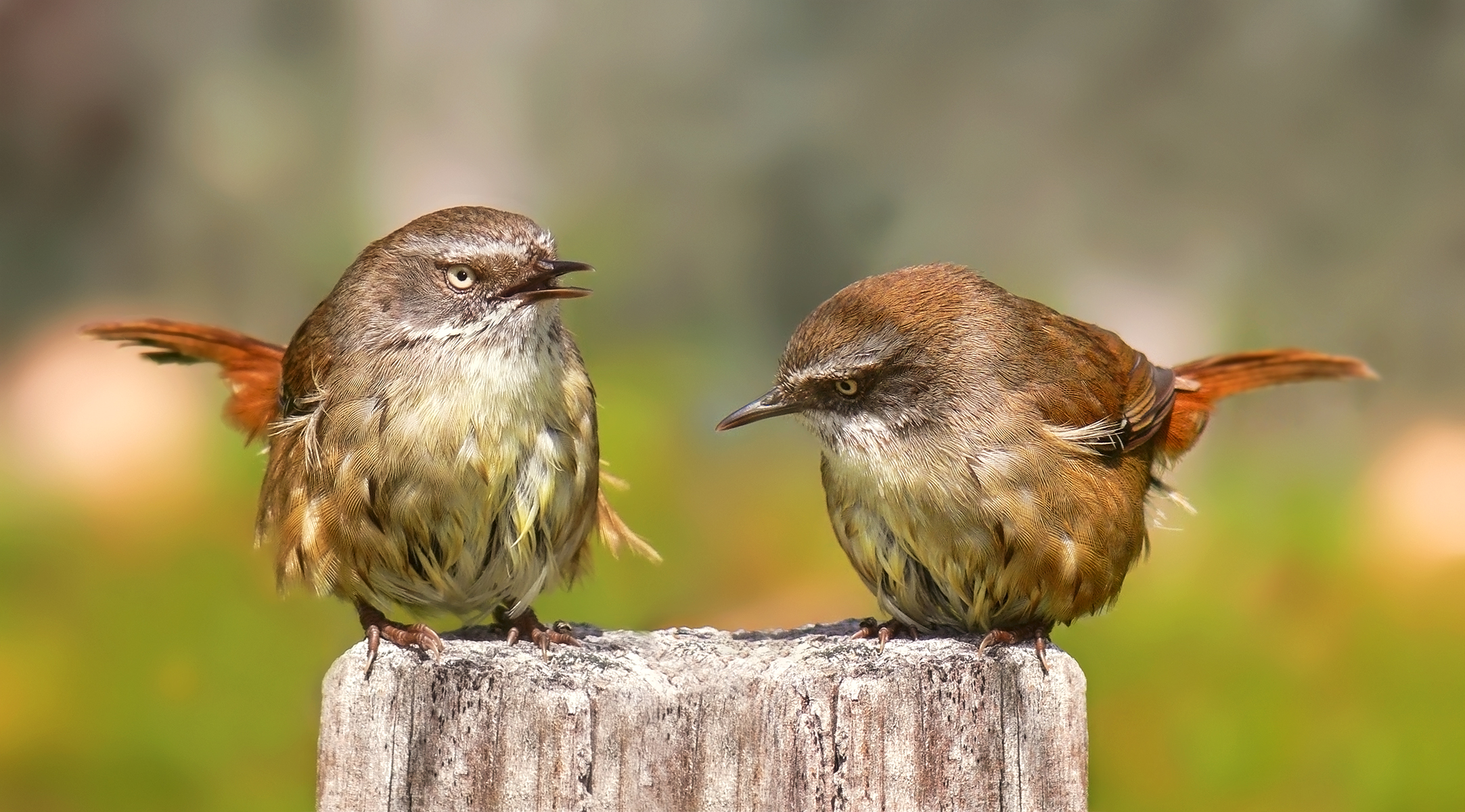
- A female (left) white-browed scrubwren (Sericornis frontalis) sings to its mate

Scientific classification
- Kingdom: Animalia
- Phylum: Chordata
- Class: Aves
- Order: Passeriformes
- Family: Acanthizidae
- Genus: Sericornis; Gould, 1838

Type species
- Acanthiza frontalis Vigors & Horsfield, 1827

Species
- See text

= Sericornis =

Genus of birds

Sericornis is a genus of small, mainly insectivorous birds, the scrubwrens in the family Acanthizidae. Despite the similarity in shape and habits, the true wrens (Troglodytidae) are a quite unrelated group of passerines.

== Taxonomy ==
The genus Sericornis was introduced in 1838 by the English ornithologist John Gould with the type species asAcanthiza frontalis Vigors & Horsfield, 1827, the white-browed scrubwren. The genus name combines the Ancient Greek σηρικος/sērikos meaning "silken" with ορνις/ornis, ορνιθος/ornithos meaning "bird".

The genus previously contained additional species but following the publication of a molecular phylogenetic study of the scrubwrens in 2018, several species were moved to the resurrected genus Aethomyias and the yellow-throated scrubwren was placed in its own monotypic genus Neosericornis.

The genus contains seven species:

- Large-billed scrubwren, Sericornis magnirostra
- Tropical scrubwren or Beccari's scrubwren, Sericornis beccarii - sometimes included in S. magnirostris
- Large scrubwren, Sericornis nouhuysi
- Spotted scrubwren, Sericornis maculatus - previously included in S. frontalis
- Tasmanian scrubwren or brown scrubwren, Sericornis humilis - previously included in S. frontalis
- Atherton scrubwren, Sericornis keri
- White-browed scrubwren, Sericornis frontalis
