= Emblema =

Emblema may mean:

- Emblema (motif), a central motif in a panel in a Greek or Roman mosaic
- Emblema (bird), a genus of finches
