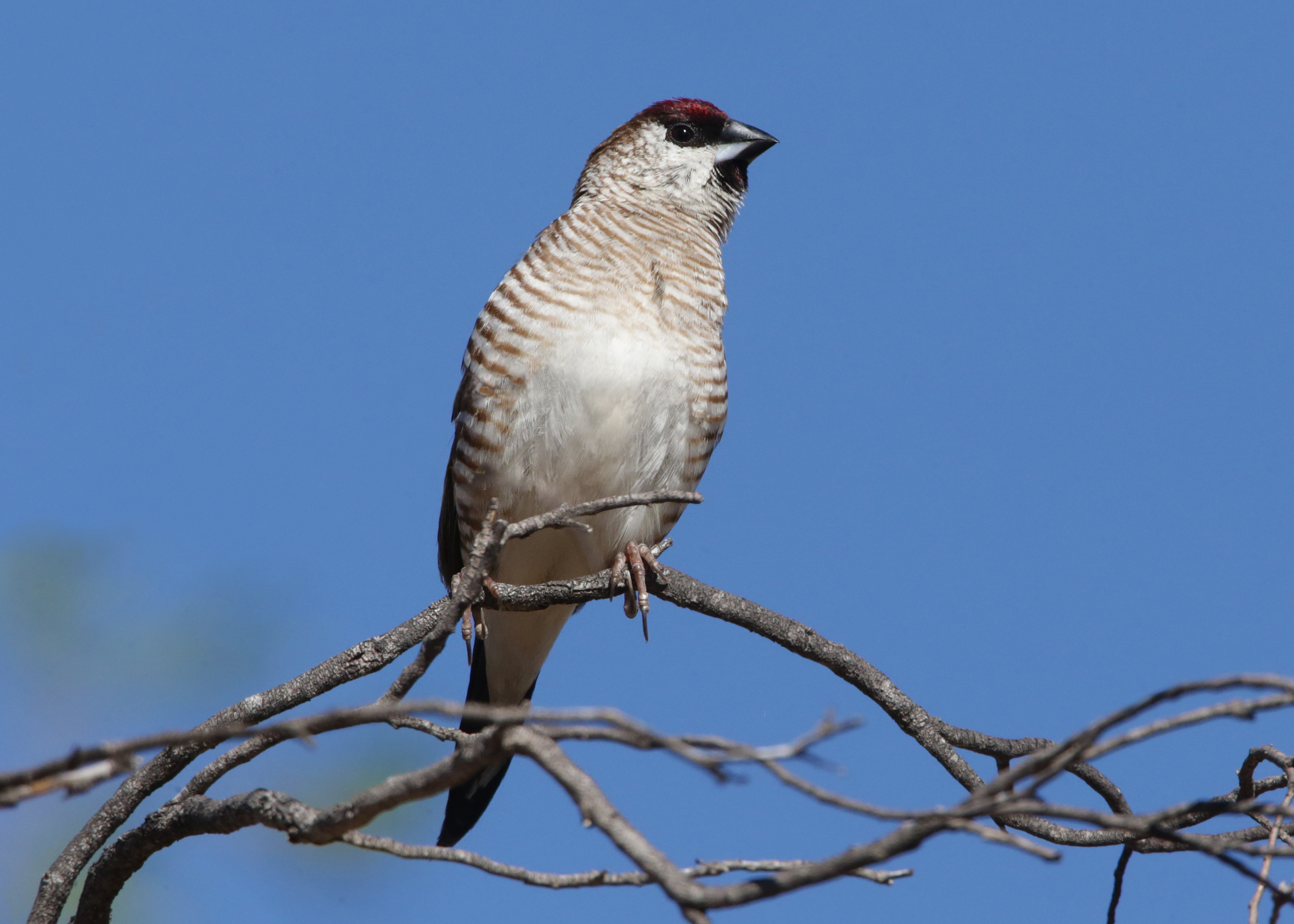

Conservation status
- Least Concern (IUCN 3.1)

Scientific classification
- Kingdom: Animalia
- Phylum: Chordata
- Class: Aves
- Order: Passeriformes
- Family: Estrildidae
- Genus: Emblema
- Species: E. modestum

Binomial name
- Emblema modestum (Gould, 1837)
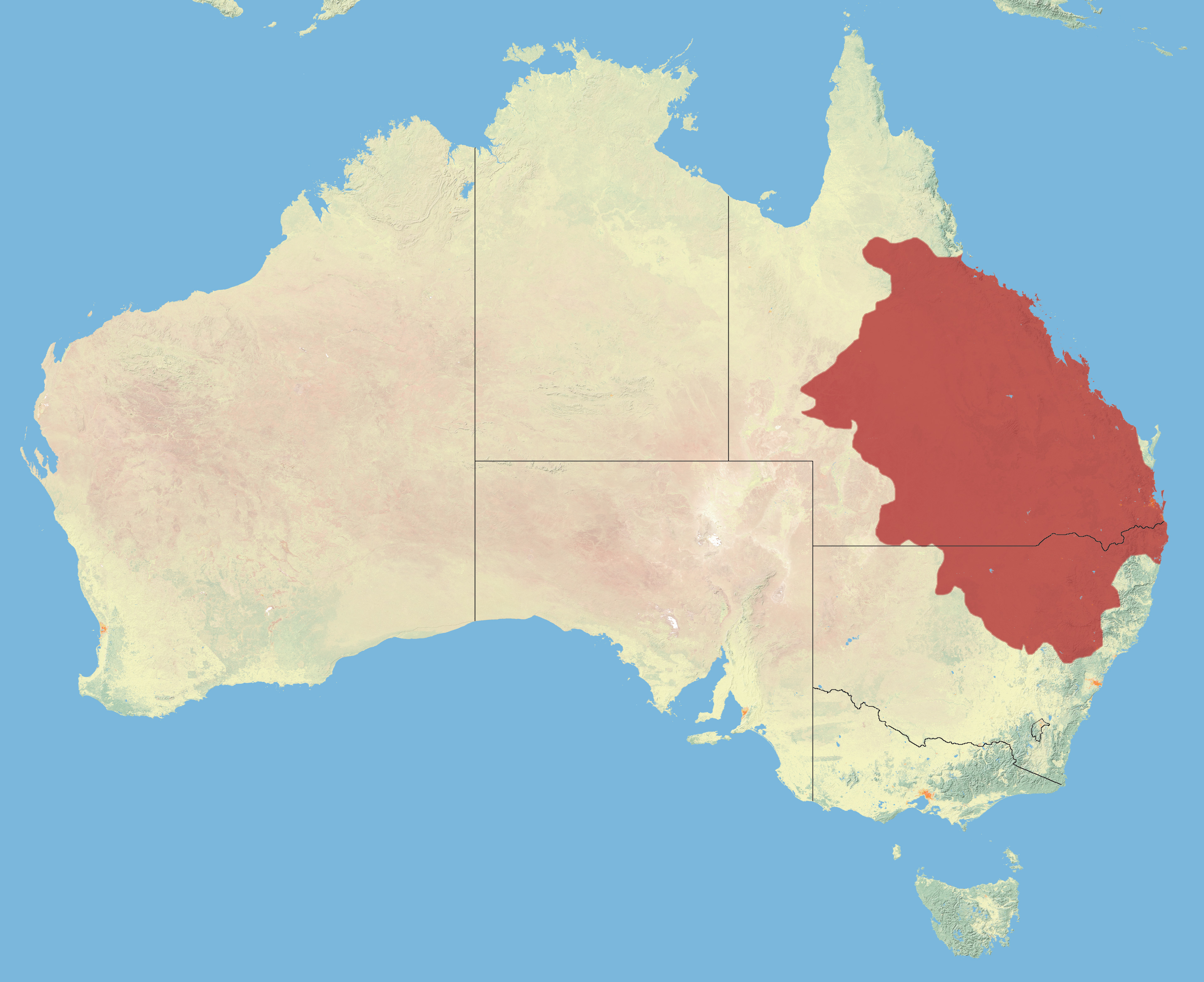
- Approximate range

Synonyms
- Aidemosyne modesta

= Plum-headed finch =

Species of bird

The plum-headed finch (Emblema modestum) also known as cherry finch is a common species of estrildid finch found in Australia. It has an estimated global extent of occurrence of 100,000 – 1,000,000 km^{2}.

== Taxonomy ==
The plum-headed finch was formally described and illustrated in 1837 by the English ornithologist John Gould in his book A Synopsis of the Birds of Australia, and the Adjacent Islands. Gould coined the binomial name Amadina modesta. This species was formerly placed in the genus Neochmia. A molecular phylogenetic study of the Estrildidae published in 2020 found that the genus Neochmia was paraphyletic. In the reorganization to create monophyletic genera, the plum-headed finch was moved to the genus Emblema that had been introduced in 1842 by the English ornithologist John Gould. The specific epithet modestum is Latin meaning "plain", "modest" or "unassuming". The species is monotypic: no subspecies are recognised.

== Description ==
The plum-headed finch is a robust bird, with a stocky, strong beak and a long tail. It measures some 15 cm long. The scientific name emphasizes the absence of the flamboyant livery typical of many Australian species, as the brown tones predominate in the plumage of this bird; the upper part of the body (nape, back, wings and tail) is in fact a deep brown color, with a tendency to darken on the tail, while the ventral area (cheeks, throat, chest, abdomen and hips) is beige color that turns towards white in the central part of the belly and on the undertail. The bird distinguishes for its fine zebra like colouring, which is white and present on the eyebrows, neck, chest, hips and tail, while on the remiges are two rows of white spots. The beak is black, the legs are flesh-colored and the eyes are dark brown. In the male there are also a rust colored bib and a frontal stain of the same color (often with a brighter color tending to purple red), which in the female are reduced or absent, in any case with a predominance of brown on red; they also have less dense stripes. The female is similar to the male but lacks the male's black chin spot.

== Distribution and habitat ==
It is found in dry savannah and subtropical/tropical (lowland) dry shrubland in Australia.

== Behaviour ==
=== Breeding ===
The plum-headed finch breeds mainly from September to January in the south and from August to March in the north. The nest is round, laterally compressed chamber of green grass and is built in thick bushes. Four to six pure white eggs are laid.

Helidon, south-east Queensland, Australia

== Status ==
The International Union for Conservation of Nature has classified this species as being of least concern.
