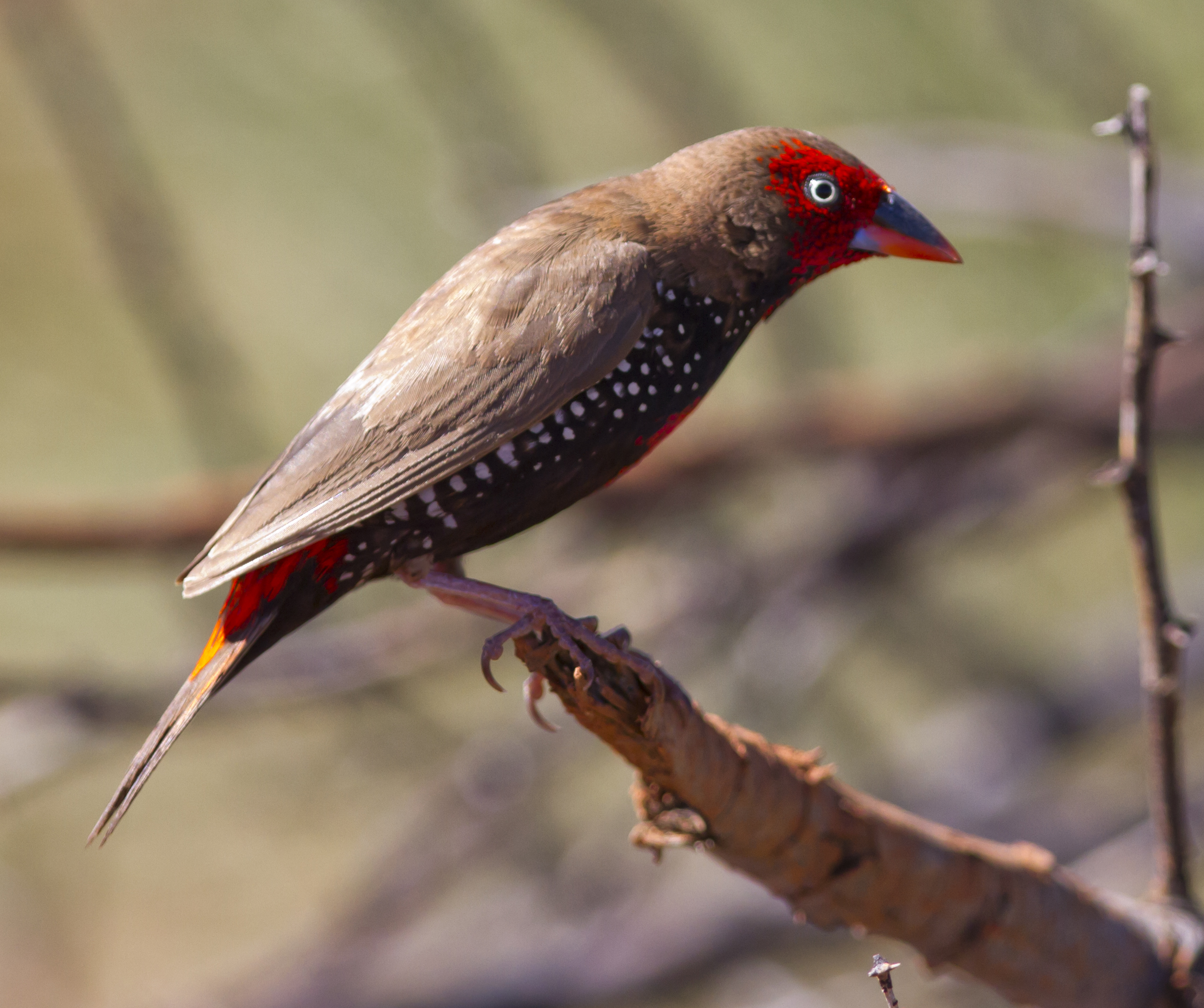
- Male in Western Australia
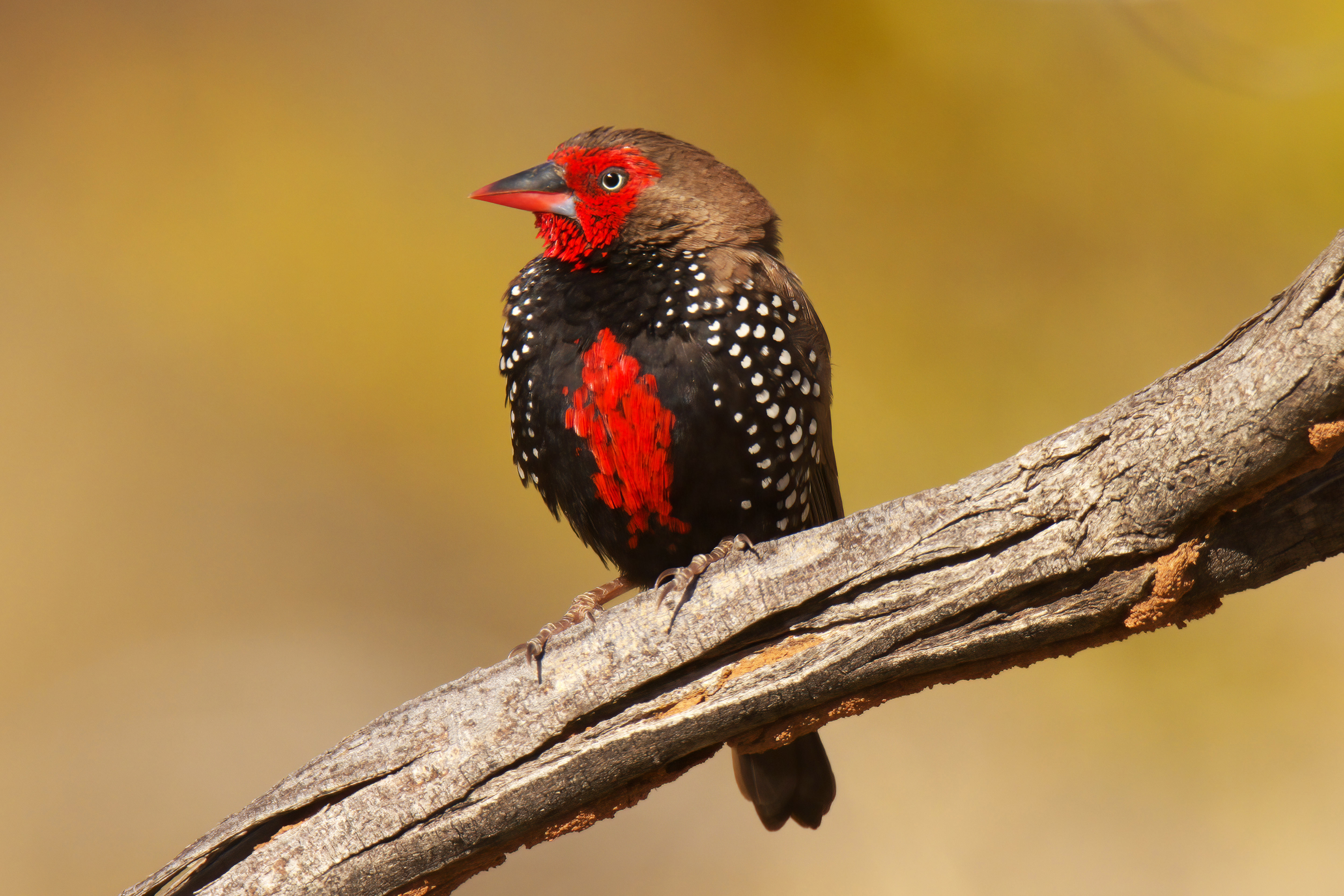
- Female at Trephina Gorge Nature Park, Northern Territory

Conservation status
- Least Concern (IUCN 3.1)

Scientific classification
- Kingdom: Animalia
- Phylum: Chordata
- Class: Aves
- Order: Passeriformes
- Family: Estrildidae
- Genus: Emblema
- Species: E. pictum

Binomial name
- Emblema pictum Gould, 1842
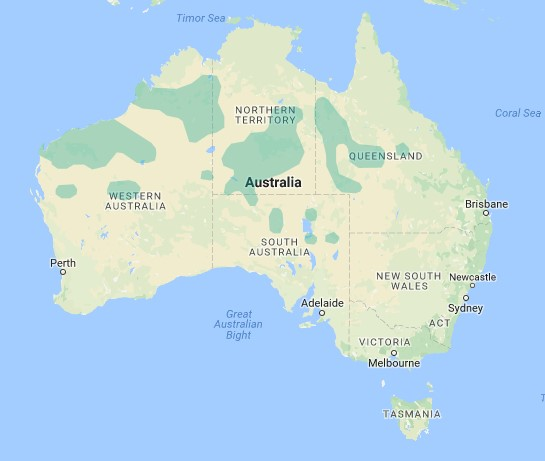
- Painted finch distribution

= Painted finch =

Australian bird

The painted finch (Emblema pictum) is a common species of estrildid finch found in Australia. The painted finch acquired its name due to the red and white spotted and mottled underparts of both males and females. The binomial comes from emblema meaning 'mosaic or inlaid work'; and pictum derives from the Latin word pictus, meaning 'painted' (from pingere, 'to paint'). Other names include Emblema finch, mountain finch, painted firetail and Emblema. The painted finch is a popular bird to be kept in captivity and in backyard aviaries.

== Taxonomy ==
The painted finch is within the genus Emblema which early studies placed four species inside of. More recent research has since determined that this genus did not form a natural assemblage and three of the four species were segregated into the genus Stagonopleura. The species include S. bella (Beautiful firetail), S. oculata (Red-eared firetail) and S. guttata (Diamond firetail). This species, Emblema pictum, is currently the only one allied to the genus.

The painted finch belongs to the family Estrildidae which consists of small passerine birds that occur naturally in the old world including Africa, southern Asia and Australasia. There are approximately 124 species of estrildid finches within 30 different genera. There has been two major radiations within this family, one occurring in Africa and one in Australia. The family Estrildidae is believed to have originated in India which then later dispersed to these two continents.

== Description ==
The painted finch is a small passerine that is 10–12 cm (3.9–4.7 in) in length and weighs around 11.5 g (0.41 oz). Male painted finches have a red forehead and face that stand out in contrast to the black breast of individuals. A bright red patch in the middle of the breast is present, while the sides of the breast, belly and flanks are black with white spots. The tail and upper body and upper wing are a reddish-brown colour. The rump and uppertail coverts are also mostly red and highly conspicuous when the birds is in flight. Painted finches have a long, slender and pointed bill which in the male the upper mandible is mostly black with a red tip and the lower mandible is mostly red with light blue-grey patches on either side of the base. The Iris of males is a cream or off-white colour and the legs of males vary between a dark brown to pinkish colour.

Females look similar to males, although the red colouration on the face is duller and is restricted to the lores, cheeks and around the eyes. The red patch present on the breast is also duller when compared to the males as are the underparts that are generally a duller brownish-black. The underparts on females though are more spotted. The bill of females is quite similar to males but usually with less red on upper mandible. The iris is also a cream or off-white colour and legs once again vary between dark brown to a pinkish colour.

Juvenile painted finches are similar in appearance to females but their underparts are duller and browner. Juveniles lack the red colouration on their face and their bill is black which becomes paler and almost pinkish on the lower part. Juvenile's eyes are a grey-brown.

== Ecology ==
=== Behaviour ===
Painted finches usually occur in pairs and small flocks; however, larger flocks of up to 100 individuals have been seen when congregating around water sources. These large flocks may contain other species of finches and honeyeaters. Painted finches are generally less vocal than other Australian grassfinches; however, its calls are among the loudest and harshest of this species group. Its contact calls have been described as sounding like trut, chek-chek or ced up, cheddy-up. When alone, males often make a loud wheezing and chattering song, females make a rattling call in response to danger near the nest.

=== Diet ===
The painted finch feeds on grass seeds mostly from spinifex (Triodia) species and sometimes may consume fruit and blades of grass. Individuals forage on the ground, hopping and bouncing among rocks and tussocks of grass in order to glean for fallen seeds. Captive birds have seen to sally-strike flying termites and glean aphids from vegetation; however, feeding on insects in the wild has not been observed.

=== Reproduction ===
If conditions are suitable painted finches breed at almost any time of year with eggs being recorded in all months except November and December, and nestlings being recorded between March and October. Courtship usually occurs on the ground and involves both sexes picking up twigs or other items and dropping them. A greeting display may replace this which involves the male singing to the female in a vertical posture, raising its body feathers and pivoting its head from side to side.

Painted finches are monogamous and nest in simple pairs. Nesting sites are usually well concealed clumps of spinifex grass, however pairs have been seen to nest in natural cavities near the top of a clump or on the ground at the base. Nesting sites may occasionally also include other species of tussock grasses or in low shrubs. Individuals build loose, bottle shaped or domed nests with a wide entrance and usually consists of stems of spinifex but may also contain other grass stems, twigs or rootlets. The nest is often lined with feathers, plant down, hairy seeds, grass, wool, fur or balls of fluff. The opening of the nest is often decorated with a piece of charcoal.

Females will lay a clutch size of 3 to 5 oval white eggs. Eggs sometimes have a bluey tinge and are incubated for around 13–14 days by both the male and female. Young are altricial and do not leave the nest until they are around 21–26 days old. Young are fed for around two more weeks and they begin to develop courtship behaviour at 10 weeks old.

== Habitat and distribution ==
The painted finch is found in arid and semi-arid zones, in rocky areas with a ground cover of spinifex grass. The painted finch can be found in Western Australia, Northern Australia, Queensland and South Australia In 2007 and 2008 large influxes of painted finches entered into western New South Wales. These individuals have since been recorded breeding and a resident population is now thought to have been established.

== Conservation status ==
On the IUCN Red list the painted finch is listed as being of "Least Concern", and this is also its listing in Queensland under the Nature Conservation Act of 1992.
