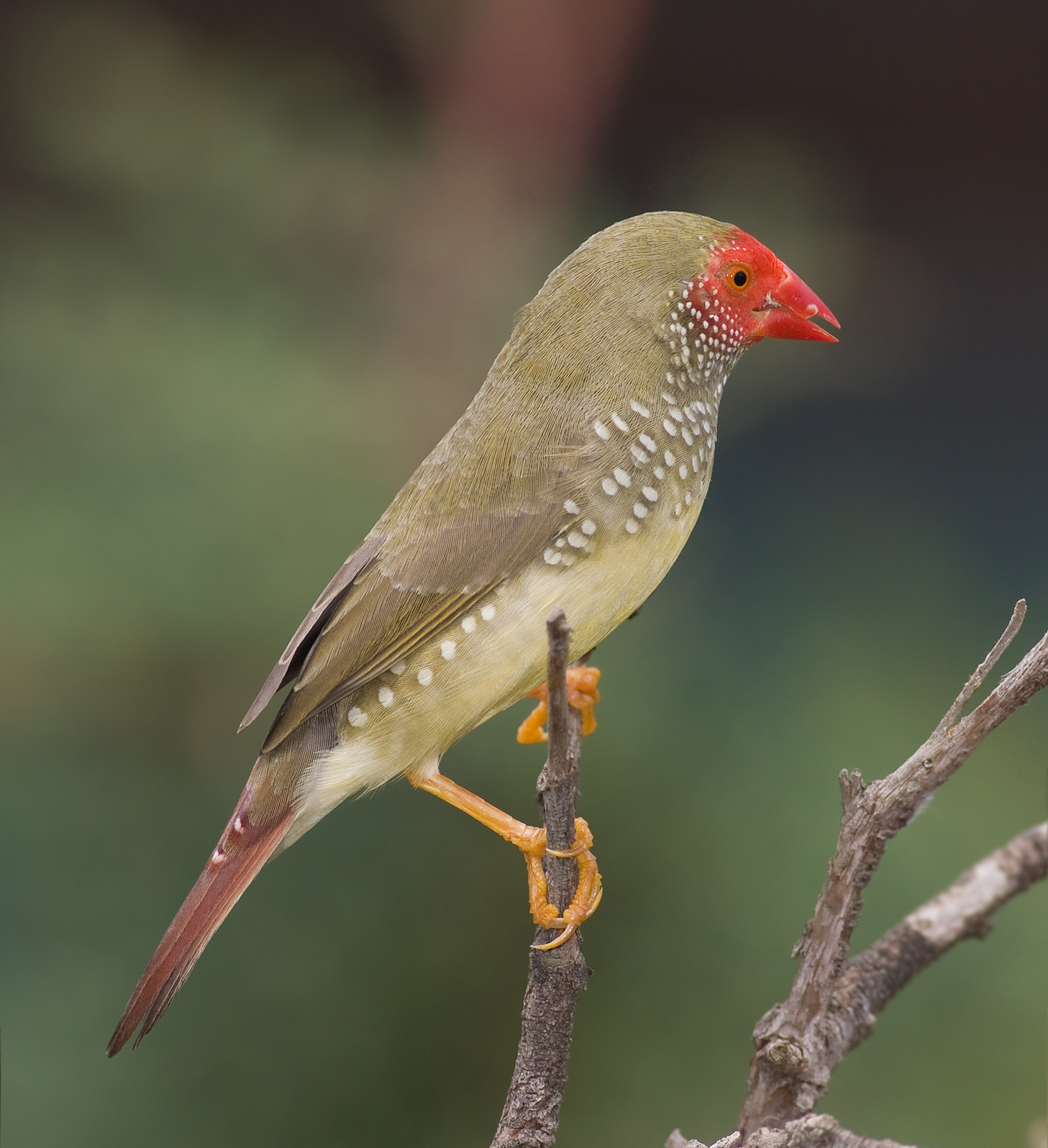

Conservation status
- Least Concern (IUCN 3.1)

Scientific classification
- Kingdom: Animalia
- Phylum: Chordata
- Class: Aves
- Order: Passeriformes
- Family: Estrildidae
- Genus: Emblema
- Species: E. ruficauda

Binomial name
- Emblema ruficauda (Gould, 1837)

Synonyms
- Bathilda ruficauda; Poephila ruficauda; Neochmia ruficauda

= Star finch =

Species of bird

The star finch (Emblema ruficauda) is a seed-eating bird species found in northern Australia. It has a distinctive red face and bill, and broad white spots down its flanks. One of its three subspecies may be extinct.

== Description ==
The star finch is an estrildid finch, between 10 and 12 cm in length, with crimson fore-parts of the head and a scarlet bill. The upper and lower plumage is yellow-green, white spotted on the underparts, the belly more yellow. The upper tail coverts are scarlet, tail feathers are brownish scarlet. The female has less crimson on the head, and generally duller than the male, the immature star finch is olive to brownish with a grey face and head. The broad white spots under its chin and down its flanks give rise to its common name. It has a wingspan of between 49 and 56 mm, a bill length between 11 and 13 mm, and weighs between 10 and 12 grams.

== Taxonomy ==
The species is also referred to as red-faced firetail, red-tailed finch, or ruficauda finch. The common name, red-tailed finch, was first used by Gould (1884) and was in near universal use from Hall (1899) until 1926 when the term star finch appeared in the Royal Australasian Ornithological Union's (RAOU) second Official Checklist with no explanation for the change.

Hombron and Jacquinot first encountered these birds when they stopped off in Australia as part the French expedition to Antarctica of 1837–1840, traveling aboard the Astrolabe. While Hombron initially placed the bird in the genus Erythura, he indicated that the short legs of the bird could necessitate a new genus, Neochimia. Gray adopted the name in 1849. Derived from the Greek, neokhmos meaning new it signifies "new bird".

Gould's species name, ruficauda, is from the Latin rufus meaning red and cauda meaning tail.

Three subspecies are recognised:

- E. r. subclarescens (Mathews, GM, 1912) – northwestern Australia (Pilbara and Kimberley regions, Western Australia, eastward to northern Northern Territory)
- E. r. clarescens (Hartert, EJO, 1899) – northeastern Australia (Cape York Peninsula, northern Queensland)
- † E. r. ruficauda (Gould, J, 1837) – formerly eastern Australia (northern Queensland to northeastern New South Wales); extinct, last recorded 1990s

== Distribution and conservation status ==
The IUCN Red List of Threatened Species rates this species as Least Concern with a decreasing population because "although its population may be declining slowly (and the nominate subspecies may now be extinct), several large and apparently stable populations remain and it is therefore no longer reasonable to suspect a moderately rapid reduction in the overall population".

In contrast the species Bathilda ruficauda is Presumed Extinct in New South Wales and the population is listed as Near Threatened in the Northern Territory.

The subspecies subclarescens has three separate subpopulations, from the Pilbara, Fitzroy River Valley, Gibb River and Wyndham/ Kununurra region of Western Australia to the western part of the Northern Territory north of the Victoria Highway. There may be 200,000 individuals and the population appears to be declining in density but is common in the Victoria River and Daly River Districts of the Northern Territory and at Kununurra in association with the Ord River Irrigation Scheme. Western star finch is the vernacular name.

The subspecies clarescens, located on the Cape York Peninsula, has a stable population of about 3,500 individuals but with patchy distribution. Its vernacular name is Cape York star finch. Its conservation status in Queensland is listed as Least Concern.

The subspecies ruficauda is known vernacularly as southern star finch. It is believed to number less than 50 individuals and is possibly extinct. The last reliable sighting was in 1994. Its status under the Environment Protection and Biodiversity Conservation Act 1999 (EPBC Act) is considered Endangered and its conservation status in Queensland is Endangered.

== Behaviour and ecology ==
These finches inhabit low, dense, damp grasslands and sedgelands bordering estuarine areas, watercourses, swamps and other freshwater-bodies. They are also found in grassy, open savanna type sclerophyll woodland and occasionally in towns. Flocks can number between 10 and 30 but can build to hundreds. They are granivorous, foraging in vegetation just above the ground and they often feed on the ground, particularly in the dry season. They nest in a globe of grass lined with feathers producing 3 to 7 white eggs.

The star finch's habitat is threatened by overgrazing of grasslands, removing essential cover for their survival as well as sources of food and water. Selective grazing of perennials during the wet season may also remove grasses that are needed for survival during the dry season. Burning of grassland during the dry season may reduce the fallen seed during the wet season and thus reduce the food supply needed by the star finch. This species is also threatened by the cage-bird trade.

== Aviary birds ==
The star finch is a common aviary bird and are said to be easy to breed. This bird has numerous mutations. The most common is the Yellow Star but others include fawn, cinnamon and pied in both normal and yellow forms. The yellow faced star finches are also called Buddha finches since they are a very peaceful species and the mango yellow resembles a Buddhist monk habit.
