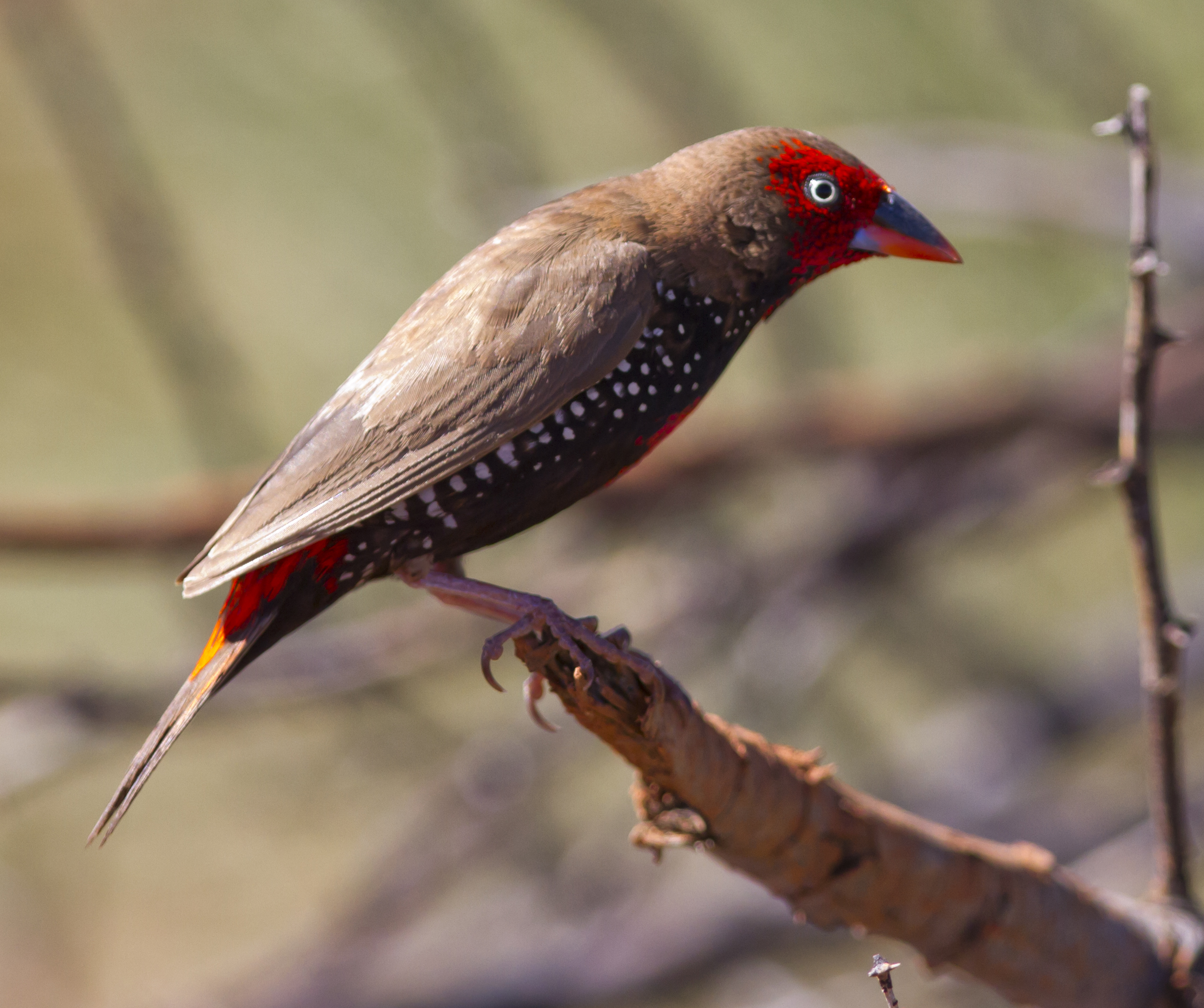
- Male painted finch (Emblema pictum)

Scientific classification
- Kingdom: Animalia
- Phylum: Chordata
- Class: Aves
- Order: Passeriformes
- Family: Estrildidae
- Genus: Emblema; Gould, 1842

Type species
- Emblema picta Gould, 1842

Synonyms
- Bathilda Reichenbach, 1862; Aidemosyne Reichenbach, 1862

= Emblema (bird) =

Genus of birds

Emblema is a genus of estrildid finches found in Australasia. They are gregarious seed-eaters with short, thick, but pointed bills.

== Taxonomy ==
The genus Emblema was introduced in 1842 by the English ornithologist John Gould to accommodate a single species, Emblema picta Gould, the painted finch. The genus name is from Latin emblema, emblematis meaning "inlaid" or "mosaic work".

The genus contains three species:

Image	Common name	Scientific name	Distribution
	Painted finch	Emblema pictum	northern Australia (Pilbara region, including Barrow Island, central Western Australia, eastward to northwestern Queensland)
	Star finch	Emblema ruficauda	northwest to northeast (formerly central east) Australia
	Plum-headed finch	Emblema modestum	eastern Australia (northern Queensland to central New South Wales)
