= List of birds of Queensland =

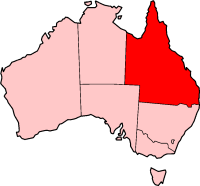
Queensland, Australia

Queensland is the second-largest state in Australia but has the greatest biodiversity, with 684 species of bird recorded (more than closest-rivals New South Wales or West Australia with both around 550).

The high avian biodiversity is probably a reflection of the wide variety of habitats, from desert to rainforest and mangrove forest to mulga, which make Queensland a birders paradise.

This list is based on the 1996 classification by Sibley and Monroe (though there has been a recent (2008) extensive revision of Australian birds by Christidis and Boles), which has resulted in some lumping and splitting. Their system has been developed over nearly two decades and has strong local support, but deviates in important ways from more generally accepted schemes. Supplemental updates follow The Clements Checklist of Birds of the World, 2022 edition.

This list also uses Australian English throughout. Any bird names or other wording follows that convention. The following tags have been used to highlight several categories. The commonly occurring native species do not fall into any of these categories.

- (A) Accidental - a species that rarely or accidentally occurs in Queensland
- (E) Endemic - a species endemic to Queensland
- (I) Introduced - a species introduced to Queensland as a consequence, direct or indirect, of human actions

== Ostriches ==
Order: Struthioniformes Family: Struthionidae

This order is not native to Australia, but feral populations of one species have become established.

- Common ostrich, Struthio camelus (I)

== Cassowaries and emu ==
Order: Casuariiformes Family: Casuariidae

This family of flightless ratite birds is represented by two living species in Australia. Another two species are found in New Guinea. The extinct, geographically isolated King and Kangaroo Island emus were historically considered to be separate species to mainland emus. However, genetic evidence from 2011 suggests that all three are conspecific.

- Southern cassowary, Casuarius casuarius
- Emu, Dromaius novaehollandiae

== Magpie goose ==
Order: Anseriformes Family: Anseranatidae

The family contains a single species, the magpie goose. It was an early and distinctive offshoot of the anseriform family tree, diverging after the screamers and before all other ducks, geese and swans, sometime in the late Cretaceous. The single species is found across Australia.

- Magpie goose, Anseranas semipalmata

== Ducks, geese, and waterfowl ==
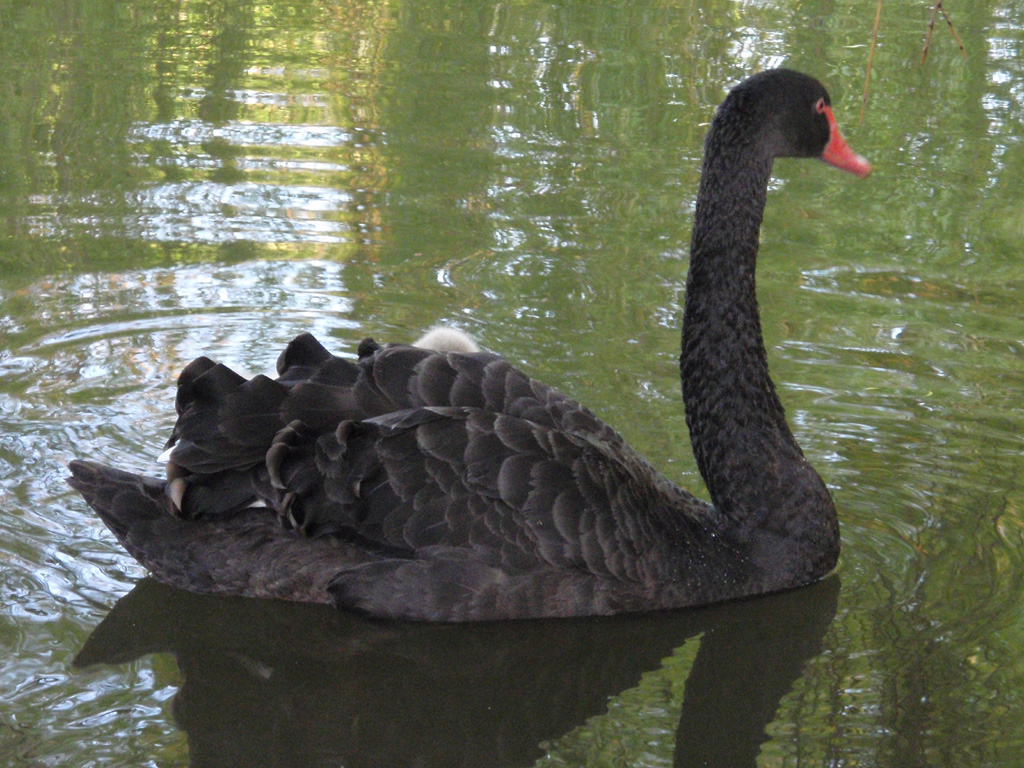
Black swan

Order: Anseriformes Family: Anatidae

The family Anatidae includes the ducks and most duck-like waterfowl, such as geese and swans. These are adapted for an aquatic existence, with webbed feet, bills that are flattened to a greater or lesser extent, and feathers that are excellent at shedding water due to special oils.

- Spotted whistling duck, Dendrocygna guttata
- Plumed whistling duck, Dendrocygna eytoni
- Wandering whistling duck, Dendrocygna arcuata
- Cape Barren goose, Cereopsis novaehollandiae
- Freckled duck, Stictonetta naevosa
- Mute swan, Cygnus olor (I)
- Black swan, Cygnus atratus
- Radjah shelduck, Radjah radjah
- Australian shelduck, Tadorna tadornoides
- Green pygmy goose, Nettapus pulchellus
- Cotton pygmy goose, Nettapus coromandelianus
- Australian wood duck, Chenonetta jubata
- Garganey, Spatula querquedula (A)
- Australian shoveler, Spatula rhynchotis
- Pacific black duck, Anas superciliosa
- Mallard, Anas platyrhynchos (I)
- Grey teal, Anas gracilis
- Chestnut teal, Anas castanea
- Pink-eared duck, Malacorhynchus membranaceus
- Hardhead, Aythya australis
- Blue-billed duck, Oxyura australis (A)
- Musk duck, Biziura lobata

== Megapodes ==
Order: Galliformes Family: Megapodiidae

Megapodiidae are represented by various species in the Australasian region. They are commonly referred to as "mound-builders" due to their habit of constructing large mounds to incubate their eggs.

- Australian brushturkey, Alectura lathami
- Orange-footed scrubfowl, Megapodius reinwardt

== Guineafowl ==
Order: Galliformes Family: Numididae

Numididae are not native to Australia, but feral populations of one species exist in Queensland.

- Helmeted guineafowl, Numida meleagris (I)

== Pheasants, grouse, and allies ==
Order: Galliformes Family: Phasianidae

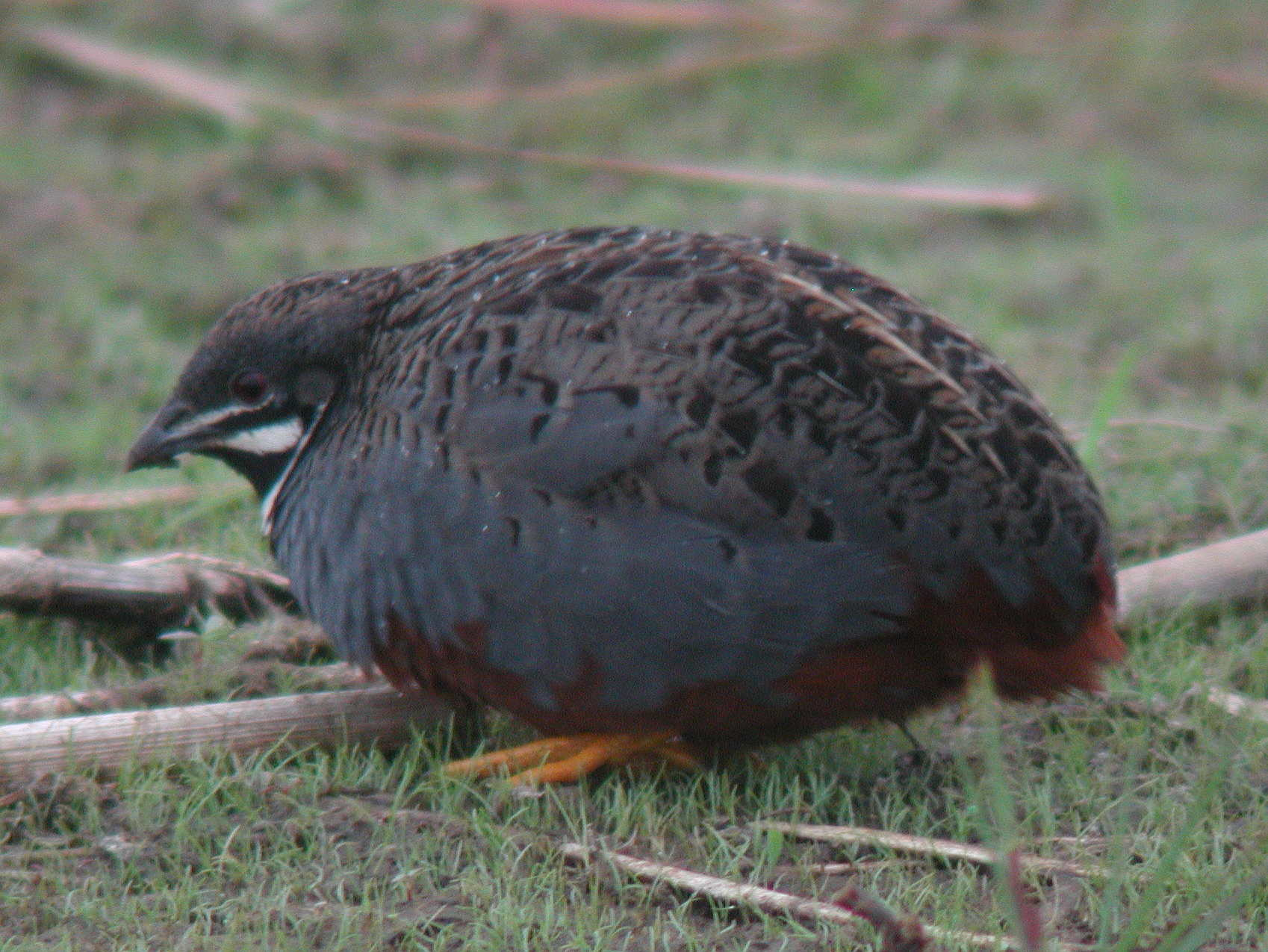
Blue-breasted quail

Phasianidae consists of the pheasants and their allies. These are terrestrial species, variable in size but generally plump, with broad, relatively short wings. Many species are gamebirds or have been domesticated as a food source for humans.

- Indian peafowl, Pavo cristatus (I)
- Brown quail, Synoicus ypsilophora
- Blue-breasted quail, Synoicus chinensis
- Stubble quail, Coturnix pectoralis
- Red junglefowl, Gallus gallus (I)
- Wild turkey, Meleagris gallopavo (I)

== Grebes ==
Order: Podicipediformes Family: Podicipedidae

Grebes are small to medium-large freshwater diving birds. They have lobed toes and are excellent swimmers and divers. However, they have their feet placed far back on the body, making them quite ungainly on land.

- Australasian grebe, Tachybaptus novaehollandiae
- Hoary-headed grebe, Poliocephalus poliocephalus
- Great crested grebe, Podiceps cristatus

== Pigeons and doves ==
Order: Columbiformes Family: Columbidae

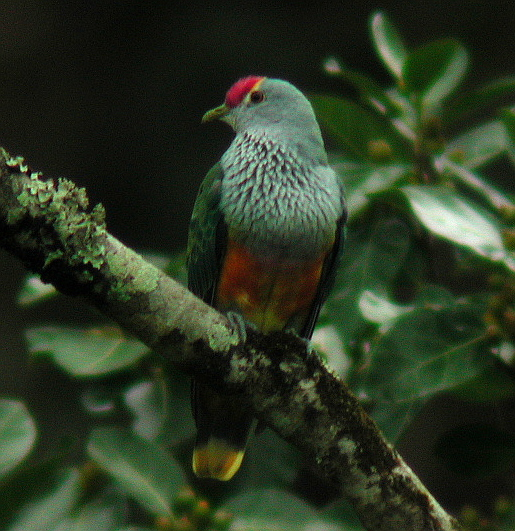
Male rose-crowned fruit dove

Pigeons and doves are stout-bodied birds with short necks and short slender bills with a fleshy cere.

- Rock dove, Columba livia (I)
- White-headed pigeon, Columba leucomela
- Spotted dove, Streptopelia chinensis (I)
- Brown cuckoo-dove, Macropygia phasianella
- Asian emerald dove, Chalcophaps indica
- Pacific emerald dove, Chalcophaps longirostris
- Common bronzewing, Phaps chalcoptera
- Brush bronzewing, Phaps elegans
- Flock bronzewing, Phaps histrionica
- Crested pigeon, Ocyphaps lophotes
- Spinifex pigeon, Geophaps plumifera
- Squatter pigeon, Geophaps scripta
- Wonga pigeon, Leucosarcia melanoleuca
- Diamond dove, Geopelia cuneata
- Peaceful dove, Geopelia placida
- Bar-shouldered dove, Geopelia humeralis
- Wompoo fruit dove, Ptilinopus magnificus
- Orange-fronted fruit dove, Ptilinopus aurantiifrons (A)
- Superb fruit dove, Ptilinopus superbus
- Rose-crowned fruit dove, Ptilinopus regina
- Orange-bellied fruit dove, Ptilinopus iozonus (A)
- Elegant imperial pigeon, Ducula concinna (A)
- Pacific imperial pigeon, Ducula pacifica
- Island imperial pigeon, Ducula pistrinaria
- Collared imperial pigeon, Ducula mullerii
- Torresian imperial pigeon, Ducula spilorrhoa
- Topknot pigeon, Lopholaimus antarcticus

== Bustards ==
Order: Otidiformes Family: Otididae

Bustards are large terrestrial birds mainly associated with dry open country and steppes in the Old World. They are omnivorous and nest on the ground. They walk steadily on strong legs and big toes, pecking for food as they go. They have long broad wings with "fingered" wingtips and striking patterns in flight. Many have interesting mating displays.

- Australian bustard, Ardeotis australis

== Cuckoos ==
Order: Cuculiformes Family: Cuculidae

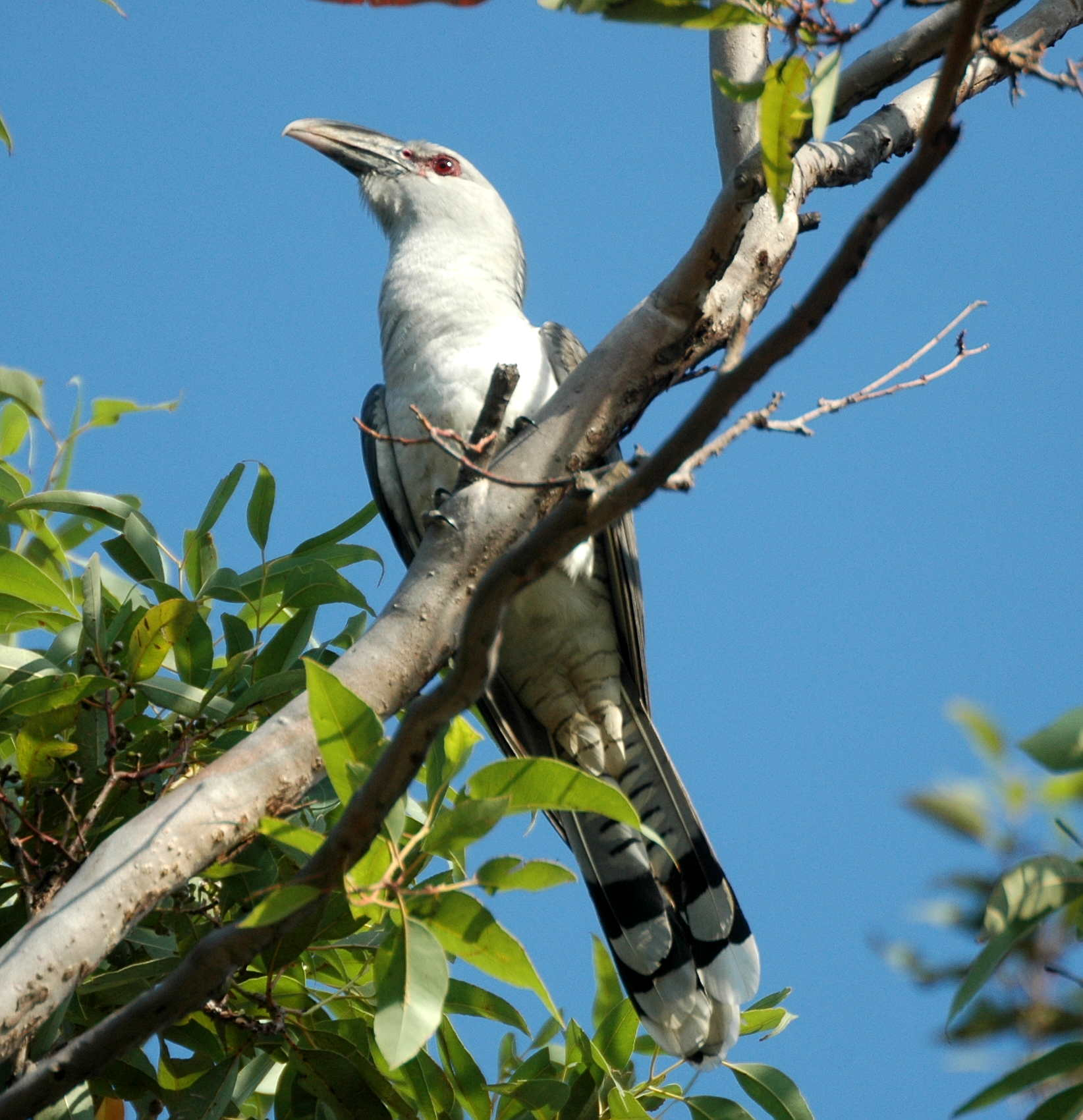
Channel-billed cuckoo

The family Cuculidae includes cuckoos, roadrunners and anis. These birds are of variable size with slender bodies, long tails and strong legs. The Old World cuckoos are brood parasites.

- Pheasant coucal, Centropus phasianinus
- Asian koel, Eudynamys scolopaceus
- Australian koel, Eudynamys cyanocephalus
- Channel-billed cuckoo, Scythrops novaehollandiae
- Horsfield's bronze cuckoo, Chrysococcyx basalis
- Black-eared cuckoo, Chrysococcyx osculans
- Shining bronze cuckoo, Chrysococcyx lucidus
- Little bronze cuckoo, Chrysococcyx minutillus
- Pallid cuckoo, Cuculus pallidus
- Chestnut-breasted cuckoo, Cacomantis castaneiventris
- Fan-tailed cuckoo, Cacomantis flabelliformis
- Brush cuckoo, Cacomantis variolosus
- Oriental cuckoo, Cuculus optatus

== Frogmouths ==
Order: Caprimulgiformes Family: Podargidae

The frogmouths are a distinctive group of small nocturnal birds related to swifts found from India across southern Asia to Australia.

- Tawny frogmouth, Podargus strigoides
- Marbled frogmouth, Podargus ocellatus
- Papuan frogmouth, Podargus papuensis

== Nightjars and allies ==
Order: Caprimulgiformes Family: Caprimulgidae

Nightjars are medium-sized nocturnal birds that usually nest on the ground. They have long wings, short legs and very short bills. Most have small feet, of little use for walking, and long pointed wings. Their soft plumage is camouflaged to resemble bark or leaves.

- Spotted nightjar, Eurostopodus argus
- White-throated nightjar, Eurostopodus mystacalis
- Large-tailed nightjar, Caprimulgus macrurus

== Owlet-nightjars ==
Order: Caprimulgiformes Family: Aegothelidae

The owlet-nightjars are a distinctive group of small nocturnal birds related to swifts found from the Maluku Islands and New Guinea to Australia and New Caledonia.

- Australian owlet-nightjar, Aegotheles cristatus

== Swifts ==
Order: Caprimulgiformes Family: Apodidae

Swifts are small birds which spend the majority of their lives flying. These birds have very short legs and never settle voluntarily on the ground, perching instead only on vertical surfaces. Many swifts have long swept-back wings which resemble a crescent or boomerang.

- Papuan spinetailed swift, Mearnsia novaeguineae (A)
- White-throated needletail, Hirundapus caudacutus
- Glossy swiftlet, Collocalia esculenta (A)
- Australian swiftlet, Aerodramus terraereginae (E)
- Uniform swiftlet, Aerodramus vanikorensis (A)
- Pacific swift, Apus pacificus
- House swift, Apus nipalensis (A)

== Rails, gallinules, and coots ==
Order: Gruiformes Family: Rallidae

Rallidae is a large family of small to medium-sized birds which includes the rails, crakes, coots and gallinules. Typically they inhabit dense vegetation in damp environments near lakes, swamps or rivers. In general they are shy and secretive birds, making them difficult to observe. Most species have strong legs and long toes which are well adapted to soft uneven surfaces. They tend to have short, rounded wings and to be weak fliers.

- Lewin's rail, Lewinia pectoralis
- Chestnut rail, Gallirallus castaneoventris
- Buff-banded rail, Gallirallus philippensis
- Black-tailed nativehen, Tribonyx ventralis
- Australian crake, Porzana fluminea
- Dusky moorhen, Gallinula tenebrosa
- Eurasian coot, Fulica atra
- Australasian swamphen, Porphyrio melanotus
- Pale-vented bush-hen, Amaurornis moluccana
- White-browed crake, Poliolimnas cinereus
- Red-necked crake, Rallina tricolor
- Baillon's crake, Zapornia pusilla
- Spotless crake, Zapornia tabuensis

== Cranes ==
Order: Gruiformes Family: Gruidae

Cranes are large, long-legged and long-necked birds. Unlike the similar-looking but unrelated herons, cranes fly with necks outstretched, not pulled back. Most have elaborate and noisy courting displays or "dances".

- Sarus crane, Antigone antigone
- Brolga, Antigone rubicunda

== Thick-knees ==
Order: Charadriiformes Family: Burhinidae

The thick-knees are a group of largely tropical waders in the family Burhinidae. They are found worldwide within the tropical zone, with some species also breeding in temperate Europe and Australia. They are medium to large waders with strong black or yellow-black bills, large yellow eyes and cryptic plumage. Despite being classed as waders, most species have a preference for arid or semi-arid habitats.

- Bush thick-knee, Burhinus grallarius
- Beach thick-knee, Esacus magnirostris

== Stilts and avocets ==
Order: Charadriiformes Family: Recurvirostridae

Recurvirostridae is a family of large wading birds, which includes the avocets and stilts. The avocets have long legs and long up-curved bills. The stilts have extremely long legs and long, thin straight bills.

- Pied stilt, Himantopus leucocephalus
- Banded stilt, Cladorhynchus leucocephalus (A)
- Red-necked avocet, Recurvirostra novaehollandiae

== Oystercatchers ==
Order: Charadriiformes Family: Haematopodidae

The oystercatchers are large and noisy plover-like birds, with strong bills used for smashing or prising open molluscs.

- Pied oystercatcher, Haematopus longirostris
- South Island oystercatcher, Haematopus finschi (A)
- Sooty oystercatcher, Haematopus fuliginosus

== Plovers and lapwings ==
Order: Charadriiformes Family: Charadriidae

The family Charadriidae includes the plovers, dotterels and lapwings. They are small to medium-sized birds with compact bodies, short, thick necks and long, usually pointed, wings. They are found in open country worldwide, mostly in habitats near water.

- Grey plover, Pluvialis squatarola
- American golden plover, Pluvialis dominica (A)
- Pacific golden plover, Pluvialis fulva
- Banded lapwing, Vanellus tricolor
- Masked lapwing, Vanellus miles
- Lesser sand plover, Charadrius mongolus
- Greater sand plover, Charadrius leschenaultii
- Double-banded plover, Charadrius bicinctus
- Red-capped plover, Charadrius ruficapillus
- Common ringed plover, Charadrius hiaticula (A)
- Semipalmated plover, Charadrius semipalmatus (A)
- Little ringed plover, Charadrius dubius (A)
- Oriental plover, Charadrius veredus
- Red-kneed dotterel, Erythrogonys cinctus
- Hooded plover, Thinornis cucullatus (A)
- Black-fronted dotterel, Elseyornis melanops
- Inland dotterel, Peltohyas australis

== Plains-wanderer ==
Order: Charadriiformes Family: Pedionomidae

The plains-wanderer is a quail-like ground bird. They are excellent camouflagers, and will first hide at any disturbance. If they're approached too close, they will run as opposed to flying, which they are very poor at.

- Plains-wanderer, Pedionomus torquatus

== Painted-snipes ==
Order: Charadriiformes Family: Rostratulidae

Painted-snipes are short-legged, long-billed birds similar in shape to the true snipes, but more brightly coloured.

- Australian painted-snipe, Rostratula australis

== Jacanas ==
Order: Charadriiformes Family: Jacanidae

The jacanas are a group of waders found throughout the tropics. They are identifiable by their huge feet and claws which enable them to walk on floating vegetation in the shallow lakes that are their preferred habitat.

- Comb-crested jacana, Irediparra gallinacea

== Sandpipers and allies ==
Order: Charadriiformes Family: Scolopacidae

Scolopacidae is a large diverse family of small to medium-sized shorebirds including the sandpipers, curlews, godwits, shanks, tattlers, woodcocks, snipes, dowitchers, and phalaropes. The majority of these species eat small invertebrates picked out of the mud or soil. Variation in length of legs and bills enables multiple species to feed in the same habitat, particularly on the coast, without direct competition for food.

- Eurasian whimbrel, Numenius phaeopus
- Little curlew, Numenius minutus
- Far Eastern curlew, Numenius madagascariensis
- Bar-tailed godwit, Limosa lapponica
- Black-tailed godwit, Limosa limosa
- Ruddy turnstone, Arenaria interpres
- Great knot, Calidris tenuirostris
- Red knot, Calidris canutus
- Ruff, Calidris pugnax
- Broad-billed sandpiper, Calidris falcinellus
- Sharp-tailed sandpiper, Calidris acuminata
- Curlew sandpiper, Calidris ferruginea
- Long-toed stint, Calidris subminuta
- Sanderling, Calidris alba
- Dunlin, Calidris alpina (A)
- Little stint, Calidris minuta (A)
- Buff-breasted sandpiper, Calidris subruficollis (A)
- Pectoral sandpiper, Calidris melanotos (A)
- Asian dowitcher, Limnodromus semipalmatus (A)
- Latham's snipe, Gallinago hardwickii
- Swinhoe's snipe, Gallinago megala
- Terek sandpiper, Xenus cinereus
- Red-necked phalarope, Phalaropus lobatus (A)
- Common sandpiper, Actitis hypoleucos
- Grey-tailed tattler, Tringa brevipes
- Wandering tattler, Tringa incana
- Common greenshank, Tringa nebularia
- Lesser yellowlegs, Tringa flavipes (A)
- Marsh sandpiper, Tringa stagnatilis
- Wood sandpiper, Tringa glareola
- Common redshank, Tringa totanus (A)

== Buttonquail ==
Order: Charadriiformes Family: Turnicidae

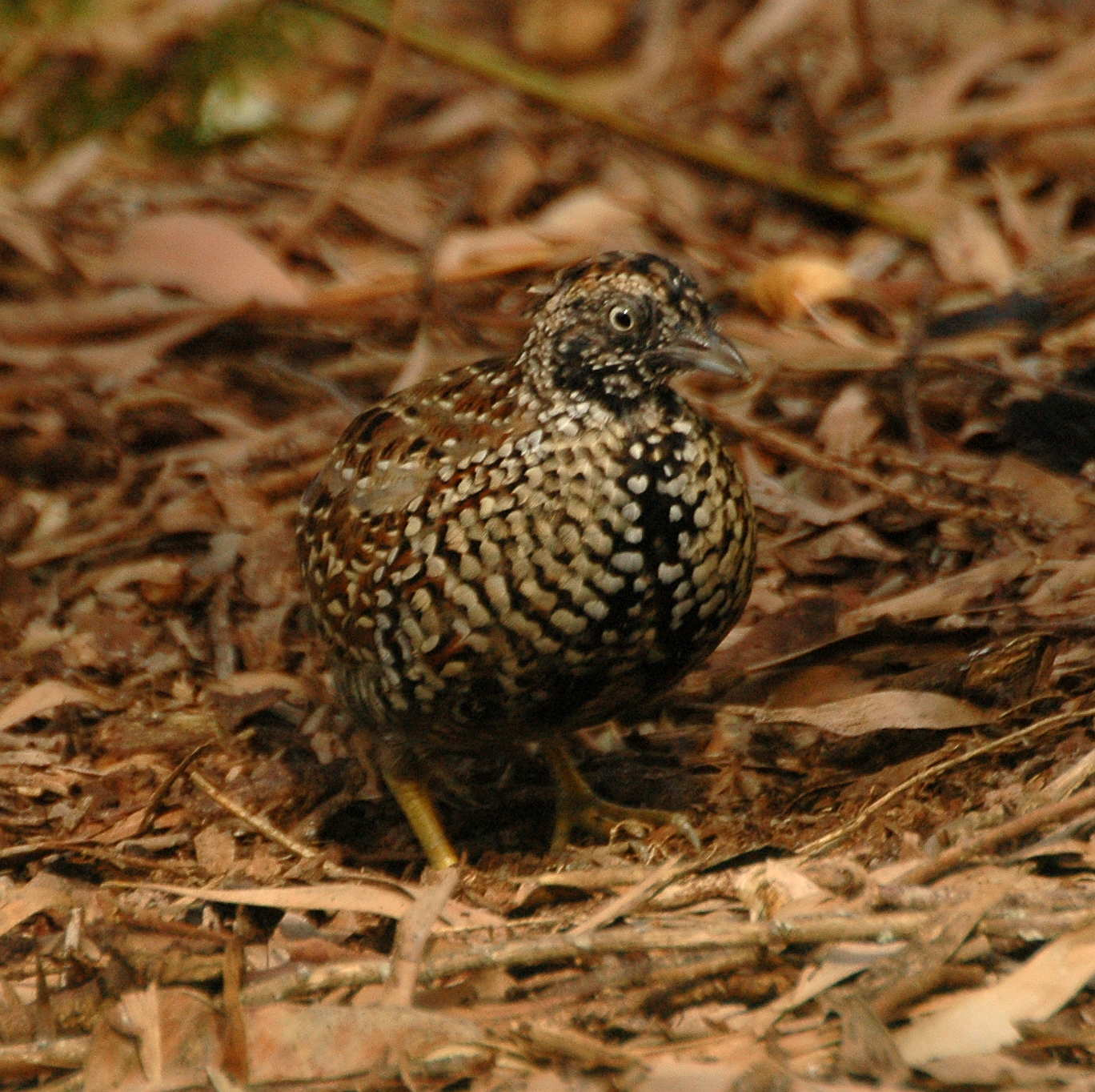
Male black-breasted buttonquail

The buttonquails are small, drab, running birds which resemble the true quails. The female is the brighter of the sexes and initiates courtship. The male incubates the eggs and tends the young.

- Red-backed buttonquail, Turnix maculosus
- Black-breasted buttonquail, Turnix melanogaster
- Buff-breasted buttonquail, Turnix olivii (E)
- Painted buttonquail, Turnix varius
- Red-chested buttonquail, Turnix pyrrhothorax
- Little buttonquail, Turnix velox

== Pratincoles and coursers ==
Order: Charadriiformes Family: Glareolidae

Glareolidae is a family of wading birds comprising the pratincoles, which have short legs, long pointed wings, and long forked tails, and the coursers, which have long legs, short wings, and long, pointed bills which curve downwards.

- Australian pratincole, Stiltia isabella
- Oriental pratincole, Glareola maldivarum

== Skuas and jaegers ==
Order: Charadriiformes Family: Stercorariidae

The family Stercorariidae are, in general, medium to large birds, typically with grey or brown plumage, often with white markings on the wings. They nest on the ground in temperate and arctic regions and are long-distance migrants.

- South polar skua, Stercorarius maccormicki (A)
- Brown skua, Stercorarius antarcticus
- Pomarine jaeger, Stercorarius pomarinus
- Parasitic jaeger, Stercorarius parasiticus
- Long-tailed jaeger, Stercorarius longicaudus (A)

== Gulls, terns, and skimmers ==
Order: Charadriiformes Family: Laridae

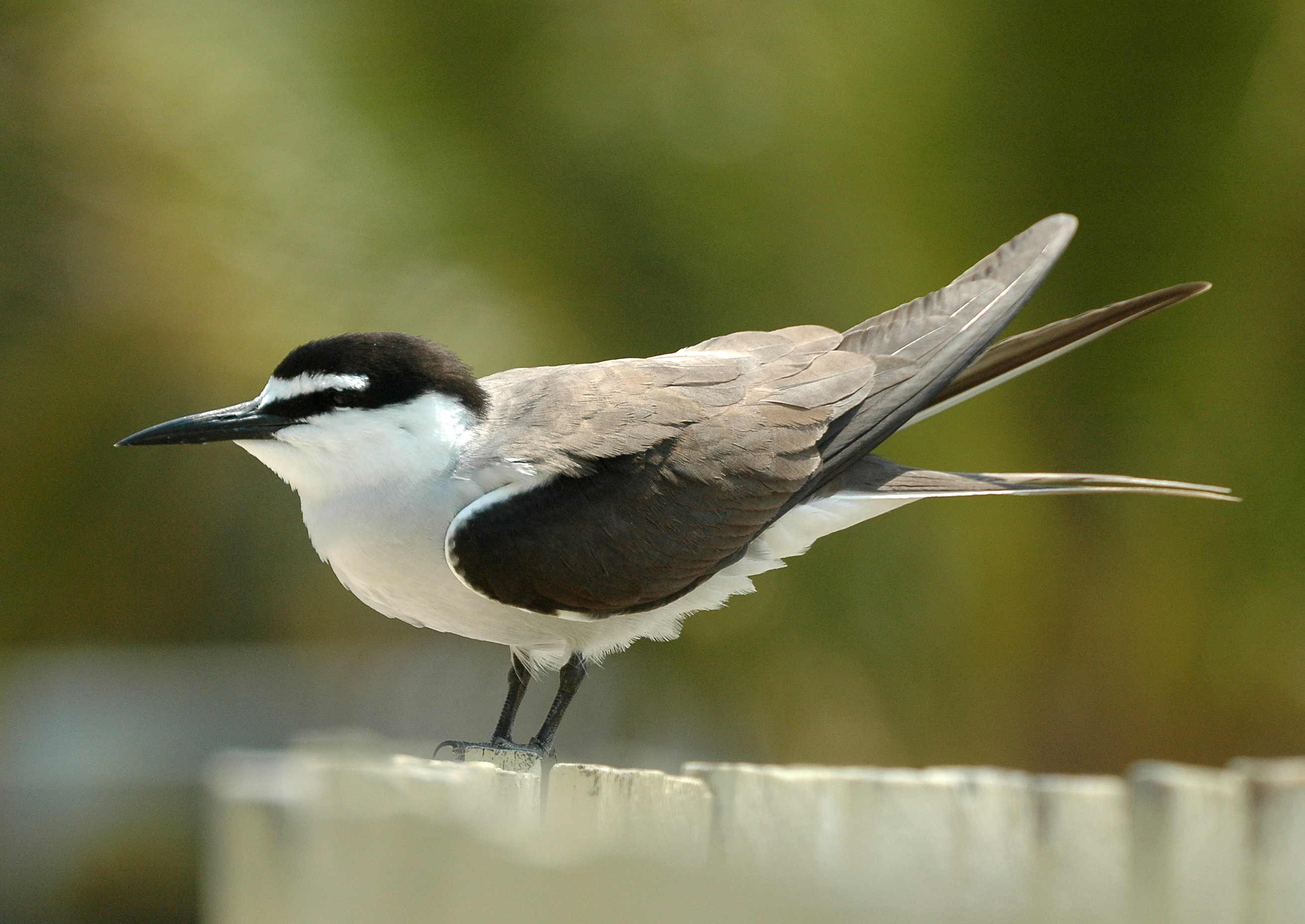
Bridled tern

Laridae is a family of medium to large seabirds, the gulls, terns, and skimmers. Gulls are typically grey or white, often with black markings on the head or wings. They have stout, longish bills and webbed feet. Terns are a group of generally medium to large seabirds typically with grey or white plumage, often with black markings on the head. Most terns hunt fish by diving but some pick insects off the surface of fresh water. Terns are generally long-lived birds, with several species known to live in excess of 30 years. Skimmers are a small family of tropical tern-like birds. They have an elongated lower mandible which they use to feed by flying low over the water surface and skimming the water for small fish.

- Silver gull, Chroicocephalus novaehollandiae
- Black-headed gull, Chroicocephalus ridibundus (A)
- Laughing gull, Leucophaeus atricilla (A)
- Franklin's gull, Leucophaeus pipixcan (A)
- Black-tailed gull, Larus crassirostris (A)
- Pacific gull, Larus pacificus (A)
- Slaty-backed gull, Larus schistisagus (A)
- Kelp gull, Larus dominicanus (A)
- Brown noddy, Anous stolidus
- Black noddy, Anous minutus
- Grey noddy, Anous albivitta (A)
- White tern, Gygis alba
- Sooty tern, Onychoprion fuscatus
- Bridled tern, Onychoprion anaethetus
- Little tern, Sternula albifrons
- Australian fairy tern, Sternula nereis (A)
- Australian tern, Gelochelidon macrotarsa
- Gull-billed tern, Gelochelidon nilotica (A)
- Caspian tern, Hydroprogne caspia
- White-winged tern, Chlidonias leucopterus
- Whiskered tern, Chlidonias hybrida
- Roseate tern, Sterna dougallii
- White-fronted tern, Sterna striata
- Black-naped tern, Sterna sumatrana
- Common tern, Sterna hirundo
- Arctic tern, Sterna paradisaea (A)
- Great crested tern, Thalasseus bergii
- Lesser crested tern, Thalasseus bengalensis

== Tropicbirds ==
Order: Phaethontiformes Family: Phaethontidae

Tropicbirds are slender white birds of tropical oceans, with exceptionally long central tail feathers. Their long wings have black markings, as does the head.

- White-tailed tropicbird, Phaethon lepturus
- Red-tailed tropicbird, Phaethon rubricauda

== Penguins ==
Order: Sphenisciformes Family: Spheniscidae

Penguins are a group of aquatic, flightless birds living almost exclusively in the Southern Hemisphere, especially in Antarctica. Only one species, the little penguin, breeds on the Australian coast.

- Little penguin, Eudyptula minor

== Albatrosses ==
Order: Procellariiformes Family: Diomedeidae

The albatrosses are a family of large seabird found across the Southern and North Pacific Oceans. The largest are among the largest flying birds in the world.

- Yellow-nosed albatross, Thalassarche chlororhynchos
- Grey-headed albatross, Thalassarche chrysostoma (A)
- Buller's albatross, Thalassarche bulleri (A)
- White-capped albatross, Thalassarche cauta
- Salvin's albatross, Thalassarche salvini (A)
- Black-browed albatross, Thalassarche melanophris
- Sooty albatross, Phoebetria fusca (A)
- Light-mantled albatross, Phoebetria palpebrata (A)
- Royal albatross, Diomedea epomophora
- Wandering albatross, Diomedea exulans

== Southern storm petrels ==
Order: Procellariiformes Family: Oceanitidae

The southern storm petrels are the smallest seabirds, relatives of the petrels, feeding on planktonic crustaceans and small fish picked from the surface, typically while hovering. Their flight is fluttering and sometimes bat-like.

- Wilson's storm petrel, Oceanites oceanicus
- White-faced storm petrel, Pelagodroma marina
- White-bellied storm petrel, Fregetta grallaria (A)
- New Zealand storm petrel, Fregetta maoriana (A)
- Black-bellied storm petrel, Fregetta tropica (A)
- Polynesian storm petrel, Nesofregetta fuliginosa (A)

== Northern storm petrels ==
Order: Procellariiformes Family: Hydrobatidae

Though the members of this family are similar in many respects to the southern storm-petrels, including their general appearance and habits, there are enough genetic differences to warrant their placement in a separate family.

- Leach's storm petrel, Hydrobates leucorhous (A)
- Band-rumped storm petrel, Hydrobates castro (A)
- Matsudaira's storm petrel, Hydrobates matsudairae

== Shearwaters and petrels ==
Order: Procellariiformes Family: Procellariidae

The procellariids are the main group of medium-sized petrels and shearwaters, characterised by united nostrils with medium nasal septum, and a long outer functional primary flight feather.

- Southern giant petrel, Macronectes giganteus
- Northern giant petrel, Macronectes halli (A)
- Southern fulmar, Fulmarus glacialoides (A)
- Cape petrel, Daption capense
- Great-winged petrel, Pterodroma macroptera
- Grey-faced petrel, Pterodroma gouldi (A)
- Kermadec petrel, Pterodroma neglecta
- Herald petrel, Pterodroma heraldica (A)
- Providence petrel, Pterodroma solandri
- Soft-plumaged petrel, Pterodroma mollis (A)
- White-headed petrel, Pterodroma lessonii (A)
- Mottled petrel, Pterodroma inexpectata (A)
- Juan Fernandez petrel, Pterodroma externa (A)
- White-necked petrel, Pterodroma cervicalis
- Black-winged petrel, Pterodroma nigripennis
- Cook's petrel, Pterodroma cookii (A)
- Gould's petrel, Pterodroma leucoptera (A)
- Collared petrel, Pterodroma brevipes (A)
- Stejneger's petrel, Pterodroma longirostris (A)
- Fairy prion, Pachyptila turtur
- Broad-billed prion, Pachyptila vittata (A)
- Salvin's prion, Pachyptila salvini
- Antarctic prion, Pachyptila desolata (A)
- Slender-billed prion, Pachyptila belcheri (A)
- Bulwer's petrel, Bulweria bulwerii (A)
- Tahiti petrel, Pseudobulweria rostrata
- White-chinned petrel, Procellaria aequinoctialis (A)
- Parkinson's petrel, Procellaria parkinsoni (A)
- Westland petrel, Procellaria westlandica (A)
- Streaked shearwater, Calonectris leucomelas
- Flesh-footed shearwater, Ardenna carneipes
- Wedge-tailed shearwater, Ardenna pacifica
- Buller's shearwater, Ardenna bulleri
- Sooty shearwater, Ardenna grisea
- Short-tailed shearwater, Ardenna tenuirostris
- Hutton's shearwater, Puffinus huttoni
- Fluttering shearwater, Puffinus gavia
- Little shearwater, Puffinus assimilis (A)
- Tropical shearwater, Puffinus bailloni (A)
- Common diving petrel, Pelecanoides urinatrix (A)

== Storks ==
Order: Ciconiiformes Family: Ciconiidae

Storks are large, long-legged, long-necked, wading birds with long, stout bills. Storks are mute, but bill-clattering is an important mode of communication at the nest. Their nests can be large and may be reused for many years.

- Black-necked stork, Ephippiorhynchus asiaticus

== Frigatebirds ==
Order: Suliformes Family: Fregatidae

Frigatebirds are large seabirds usually found over tropical oceans. They are large, black, or black-and-white, with long wings and deeply forked tails. The males have coloured inflatable throat pouches. They do not swim or walk and cannot take off from a flat surface. Having the largest wingspan-to-body-weight ratio of any bird, they are essentially aerial, able to stay aloft for more than a week.

- Lesser frigatebird, Fregata ariel
- Great frigatebird, Fregata minor

== Boobies and gannets ==
Order: Suliformes Family: Sulidae

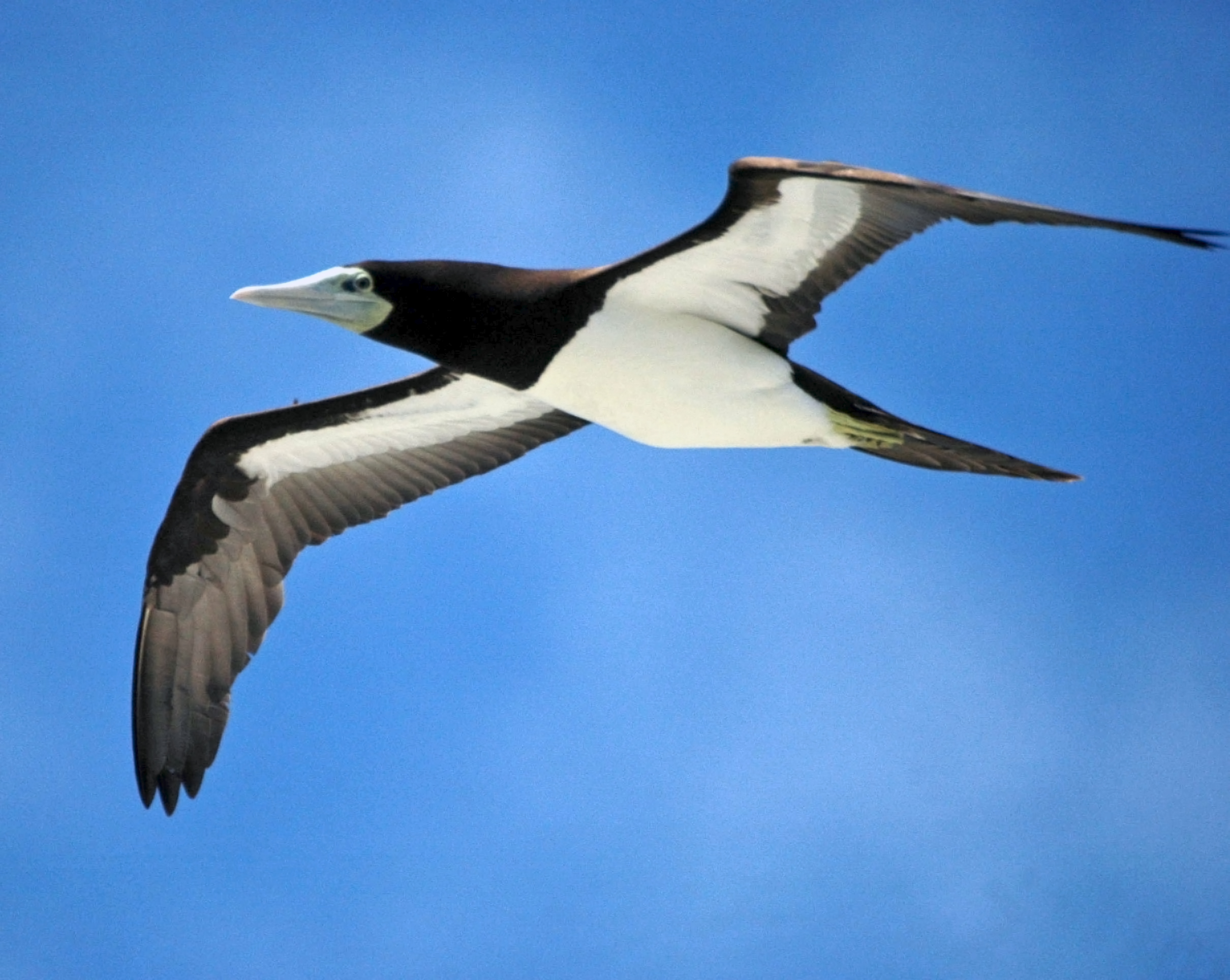
Brown booby

The sulids comprise the gannets and boobies. Both groups are medium-large coastal seabirds that plunge-dive for fish.

- Masked booby, Sula dactylatra
- Brown booby, Sula leucogaster
- Red-footed booby, Sula sula
- Australasian gannet, Morus serrator

== Anhingas ==
Order: Suliformes Family: Anhingidae

Anhingas or darters are cormorant-like water birds with long necks and long, straight bills. They are fish eaters which often swim with only their neck above the water.

- Australasian darter, Anhinga novaehollandiae

== Cormorants and shags ==
Order: Suliformes Family: Phalacrocoracidae

Cormorants are medium-to-large aquatic birds, usually with mainly dark plumage and areas of coloured skin on the face. The bill is long, thin and sharply hooked. Their feet are four-toed and webbed, a distinguishing feature among the order Pelecaniformes.

- Little pied cormorant, Microcarbo melanoleucos
- Great cormorant, Phalacrocorax carbo
- Little black cormorant, Phalacrocorax sulcirostris
- Pied cormorant, Phalacrocorax varius

== Pelicans ==
Order: Pelecaniformes Family: Pelecanidae

Pelicans are large water birds with distinctive pouches under their bills. Like other birds in the order Pelecaniformes, they have four webbed toes.

- Australian pelican, Pelecanus conspicillatus

== Herons, egrets, and bitterns ==
Order: Pelecaniformes Family: Ardeidae

The family Ardeidae contains the bitterns, herons, and egrets. Herons and egrets are medium to large wading birds with long necks and legs. Bitterns tend to be shorter necked and more wary. Members of Ardeidae fly with their necks retracted, unlike other long-necked birds such as storks, ibises, and spoonbills.

- Australasian bittern, Botaurus poiciloptilus
- Yellow bittern, Ixobrychus sinensis (A)
- Black-backed bittern, Ixobrychus dubius
- Black bittern, Ixobrychus flavicollis
- Pacific heron, Ardea pacifica
- Great-billed heron, Ardea sumatrana
- Great egret, Ardea alba
- Intermediate egret, Ardea intermedia
- White-faced heron, Egretta novaehollandiae
- Little egret, Egretta garzetta
- Pacific reef heron, Egretta sacra
- Pied heron, Egretta picata
- Cattle egret, Bubulcus ibis
- Striated heron, Butorides striata
- Nankeen night heron, Nycticorax caledonicus

== Ibises and spoonbills ==
Order: Pelecaniformes Family: Threskiornithidae

Threskiornithidae is a family of large terrestrial and wading birds which includes the ibises and spoonbills. They have long, broad wings with 11 primary and about 20 secondary feathers. They are strong fliers and despite their size and weight, very capable soarers.

- Glossy ibis, Plegadis falcinellus
- Australian ibis, Threskiornis moluccus
- Straw-necked ibis, Threskiornis spinicollis
- Royal spoonbill, Platalea regia
- Yellow-billed spoonbill, Platalea flavipes

== Osprey ==
Order: Accipitriformes Family: Pandionidae

The family Pandionidae contains only one species, the osprey. The osprey is a medium-large raptor which is a specialist fish-eater with a worldwide distribution.

- Osprey, Pandion haliaetus

== Hawks, eagles, and kites ==
Order: Accipitriformes Family: Accipitridae

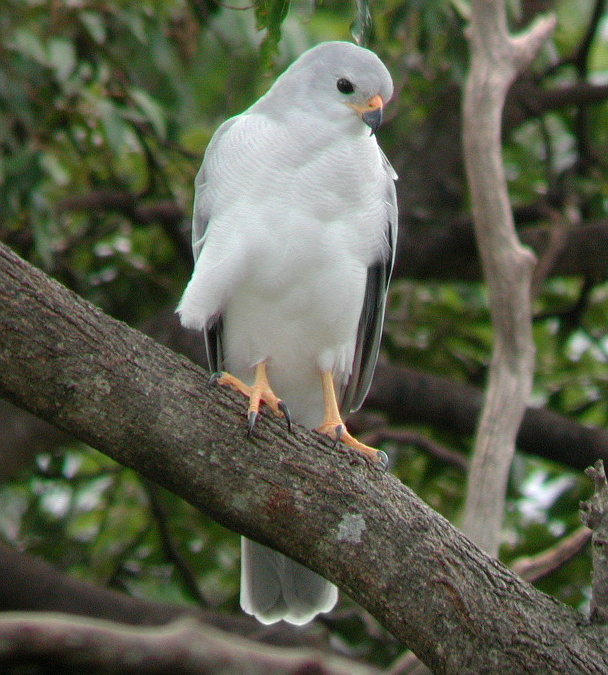
Grey goshawk

Accipitridae is a family of birds of prey, which includes hawks, eagles, kites, harriers and Old World vultures. These birds have powerful hooked beaks for tearing flesh from their prey, strong legs, powerful talons and keen eyesight.

- Black-shouldered kite, Elanus axillaris
- Letter-winged kite, Elanus scriptus
- Black-breasted kite, Hamirostra melanosternon
- Square-tailed kite, Lophoictinia isura
- Pacific baza, Aviceda subcristata
- Little eagle, Hieraaetus morphnoides
- Gurney's eagle, Aquila gurneyi (A)
- Wedge-tailed eagle, Aquila audax
- Swamp harrier, Circus approximans
- Spotted harrier, Circus assimilis
- Grey goshawk, Accipiter novaehollandiae
- Brown goshawk, Accipiter fasciatus
- Collared sparrowhawk, Accipiter cirrocephalus
- Red goshawk, Erythrotriorchis radiatus
- Black kite, Milvus migrans
- Whistling kite, Haliastur sphenurus
- Brahminy kite, Haliastur indus
- White-bellied sea eagle, Haliaeetus leucogaster

== Barn owls ==
Order: Strigiformes Family: Tytonidae

Barn owls are medium to large owls with large heads and characteristic heart-shaped faces. They have long strong legs with powerful talons.

- Sooty owl, Tyto tenebricosa
- Australian masked owl, Tyto novaehollandiae
- Australasian grass owl, Tyto longimembris
- Eastern barn owl, Tyto javanica

== Owls ==
Order: Strigiformes Family: Strigidae

The typical owls are small to large solitary nocturnal birds of prey. They have large forward-facing eyes and ears, a hawk-like beak, and a conspicuous circle of feathers around each eye called a facial disk.

- Rufous owl, Ninox rufa
- Powerful owl, Ninox strenua
- Barking owl, Ninox connivens
- Southern boobook, Ninox boobook
- Morepork, Ninox novaeseelandiae

== Kingfishers ==
Order: Coraciiformes Family: Alcedinidae

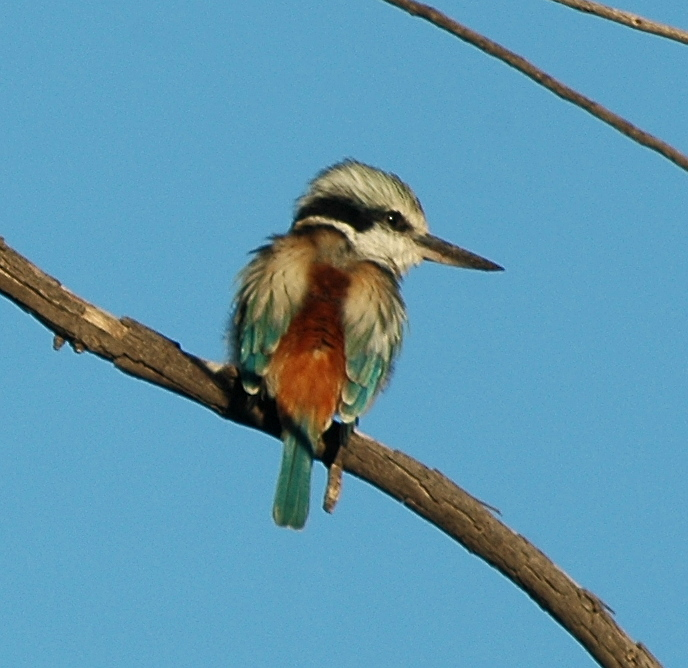
Red-backed kingfisher

Kingfishers are medium-sized birds with large heads, long pointed bills, short legs, and stubby tails.

- Azure kingfisher, Ceyx azureus
- Little kingfisher, Ceyx pusillus
- Laughing kookaburra, Dacelo novaeguineae
- Blue-winged kookaburra, Dacelo leachii
- Red-backed kingfisher, Todiramphus pyrrhopygius
- Forest kingfisher, Todiramphus macleayii
- Torresian kingfisher, Todiramphus sordidus
- Sacred kingfisher, Todiramphus sanctus
- Yellow-billed kingfisher, Syma torotoro
- Little paradise kingfisher, Tanysiptera hydrocharis (A)
- Buff-breasted paradise kingfisher, Tanysiptera sylvia

== Bee-eaters ==
Order: Coraciiformes Family: Meropidae

The bee-eaters are a group of near passerine birds in the family Meropidae. Most species are found in Africa but others occur in southern Europe, Madagascar, Australia, and New Guinea. They are characterised by richly coloured plumage, slender bodies, and usually elongated central tail feathers. All are colourful and have long downturned bills and pointed wings, which give them a swallow-like appearance when seen from afar.

- Rainbow bee-eater, Merops ornatus

== Rollers ==
Order: Coraciiformes Family: Coraciidae

Rollers resemble crows in size and build, but are more closely related to the kingfishers and bee-eaters. They share the colourful appearance of those groups with blues and browns predominating. The two inner front toes are connected, but the outer toe is not.

- Dollarbird, Eurystomus orientalis

== Falcons and caracaras ==
Order: Falconiformes Family: Falconidae

Falconidae is a family of diurnal birds of prey. They differ from hawks, eagles, and kites in that they kill with their beaks instead of their talons.

- Nankeen kestrel, Falco cenchroides
- Australian hobby, Falco longipennis
- Brown falcon, Falco berigora
- Grey falcon, Falco hypoleucos
- Black falcon, Falco subniger
- Peregrine falcon, Falco peregrinus

== Cockatoos ==
Order: Psittaciformes Family: Cacatuidae

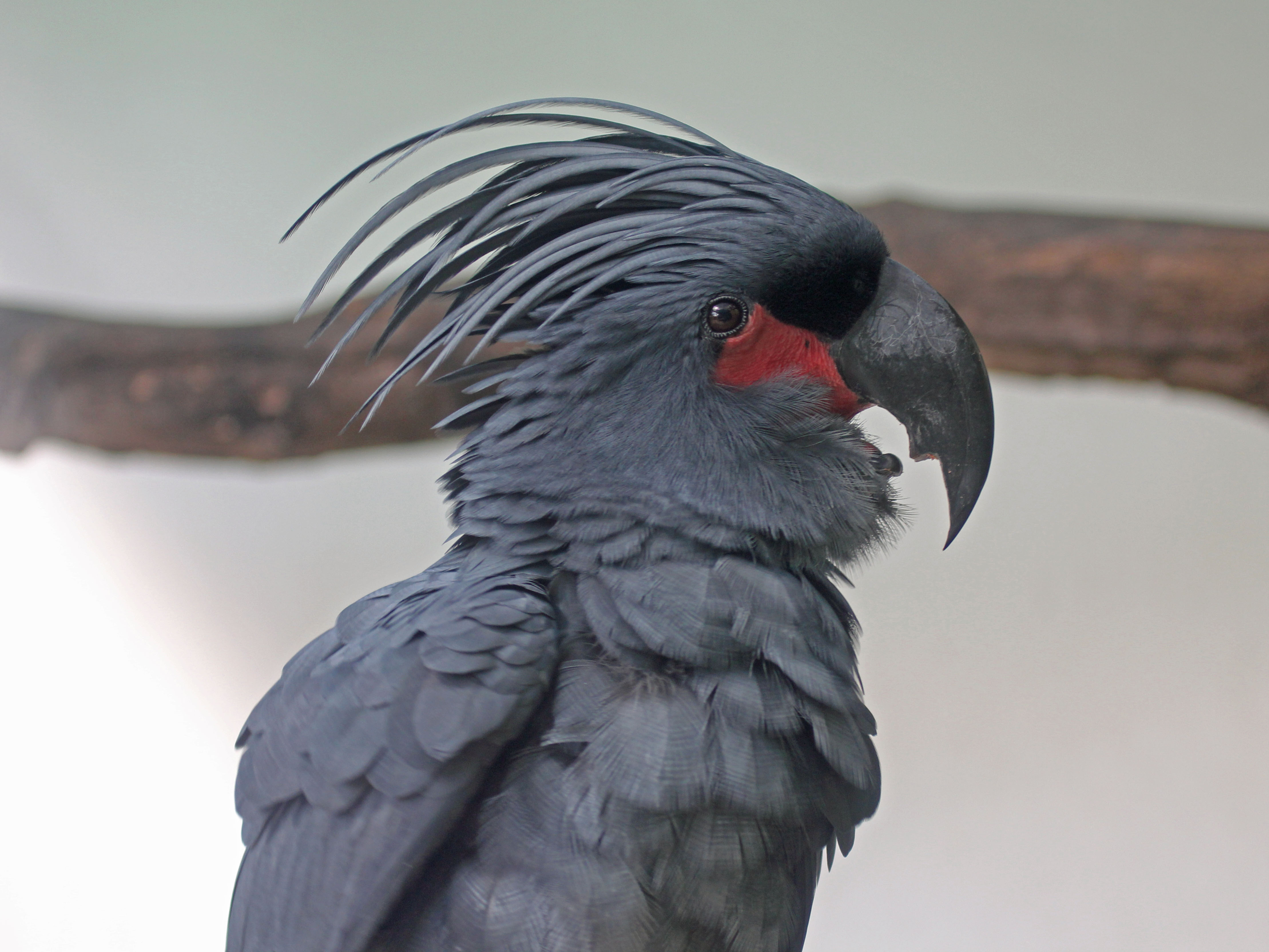
Palm cockatoo

The cockatoos share many features with other parrots including the characteristic curved beak shape and a zygodactyl foot, with two forward toes and two backwards toes. They differ, however in a number of characteristics, including the often spectacular movable headcrest.

- Palm cockatoo, Probosciger aterrimus
- Red-tailed black cockatoo, Calyptorhynchus banksii
- Glossy black cockatoo, Calyptorhynchus lathami
- Yellow-tailed black cockatoo, Calyptorhynchus funereus
- Pink cockatoo, Lophochroa leadbeateri
- Galah, Eolophus roseicapilla
- Long-billed corella, Cacatua tenuirostris (I)
- Little corella, Cacatua sanguinea
- Sulphur-crested cockatoo, Cacatua galerita
- Cockatiel, Nymphicus hollandicus

== Old World parrots ==
Order: Psittaciformes Family: Psittaculidae

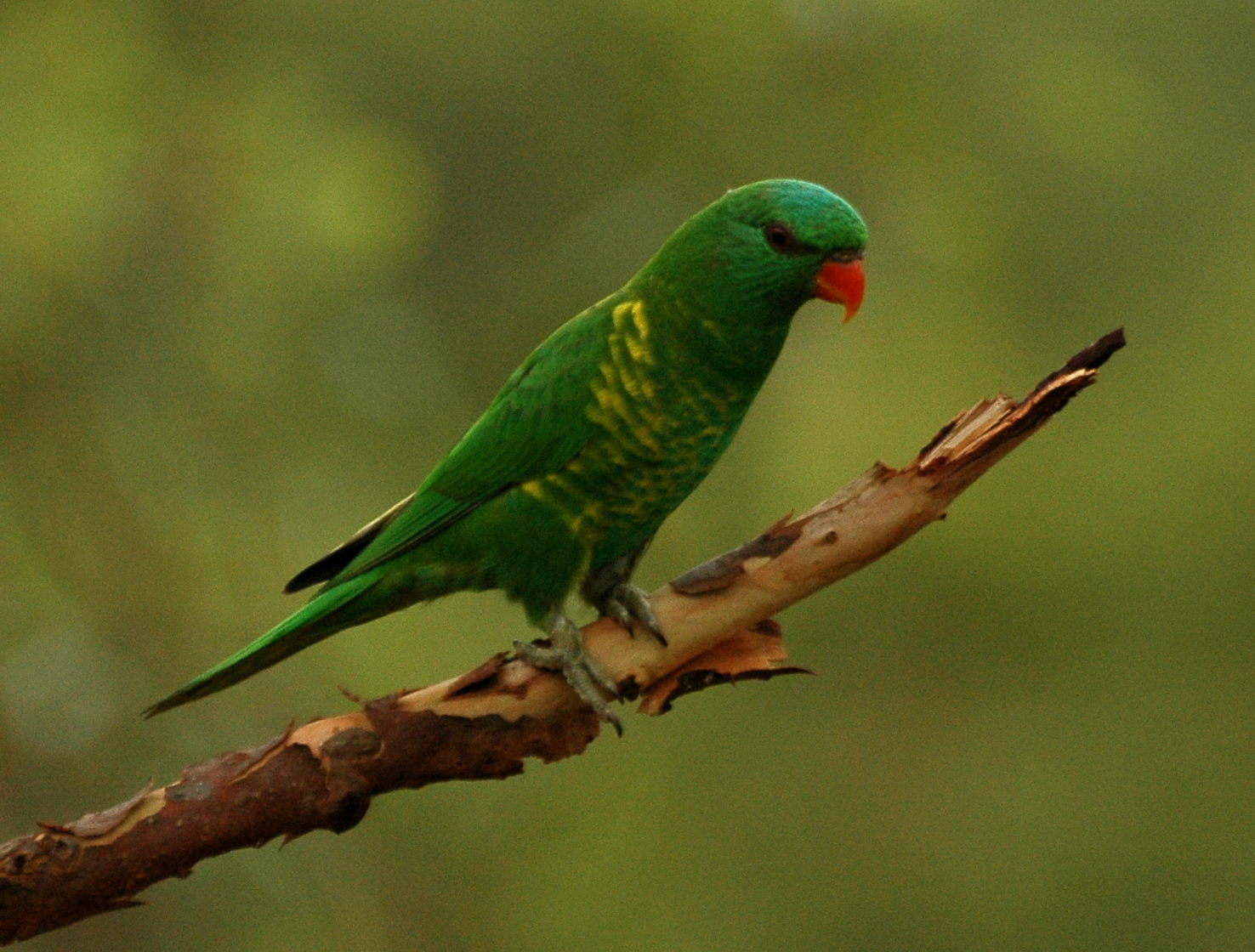
Scaly-breasted lorikeet

Characteristic features of parrots include a strong curved bill, an upright stance, strong legs, and clawed zygodactyl feet. Many parrots are vividly coloured, and some are multi-coloured. In size they range from 8 cm (3.1 in) to 1 m (3.3 ft) in length. Old World parrots are found from Africa east across south and southeast Asia and Oceania to Australia and New Zealand.

- Superb parrot, Polytelis swainsonii (A)
- Australian king parrot, Alisterus scapularis
- Red-winged parrot, Aprosmictus erythropterus
- Eclectus parrot, Eclectus roratus
- Red-cheeked parrot, Geoffroyus geoffroyi
- Ground parrot, Pezoporus wallicus
- Night parrot, Pezoporus occidentalis
- Bourke's parrot, Neophema bourkii
- Blue-winged parrot, Neophema chrysostoma
- Turquoise parrot, Neophema pulchella
- Scarlet-chested parrot, Neophema splendida
- Swift parrot, Lathamus discolor
- Australian ringneck, Barnardius barnardi
- Crimson rosella, Platycercus elegans
- Northern rosella, Platycercus venustus
- Eastern rosella, Platycercus eximius
- Pale-headed rosella, Platycercus adscitus
- Greater bluebonnet, Northiella haematogaster
- Red-rumped parrot, Psephotus haematonotus
- Mulga parrot, Psephotus varius
- Golden-shouldered parrot, Psephotus chrysopterygius (E)
- Paradise parrot, Psephotus pulcherrimus
- Red-capped parrot, Purpureicephalus spurius
- Double-eyed fig parrot, Cyclopsitta diophthalma
- Budgerigar, Melopsittacus undulatus
- Musk lorikeet, Glossopsitta concinna
- Little lorikeet, Parvipsitta pusilla
- Varied lorikeet, Psitteuteles versicolor
- Coconut lorikeet, Trichoglossus haematodus
- Red-collared lorikeet, Trichoglossus rubritorquis
- Rainbow lorikeet, Trichoglossus moluccanus
- Scaly-breasted lorikeet, Trichoglossus chlorolepidotus

== Pittas ==
Order: Passeriformes Family: Pittidae

Pittas are medium-sized by passerine standards and are stocky, with fairly long, strong legs, short tails, and stout bills. Many are brightly coloured. They spend the majority of their time on wet forest floors, eating snails, insects, and similar invertebrates.

- Papuan pitta, Erythropitta macklotii
- Noisy pitta, Pitta versicolor

== Lyrebirds ==
Order: Passeriformes Family: Menuridae

Lyrebirds are most notable for their superb ability to mimic natural and artificial sounds from their environment, and the striking beauty of the male bird's huge tail when it is fanned out in courtship display.

- Albert's lyrebird, Menura alberti
- Superb lyrebird, Menura novaehollandiae

== Scrubbirds ==
Order: Passeriformes Family: Atrichornithidae

The scrubbird family is ancient and is understood to be most closely related to the lyrebirds, and likely also to the bowerbirds and Australasian treecreepers.

- Rufous scrubbird, Atrichornis rufescens

== Bowerbirds ==
Order: Passeriformes Family: Ptilonorhynchidae

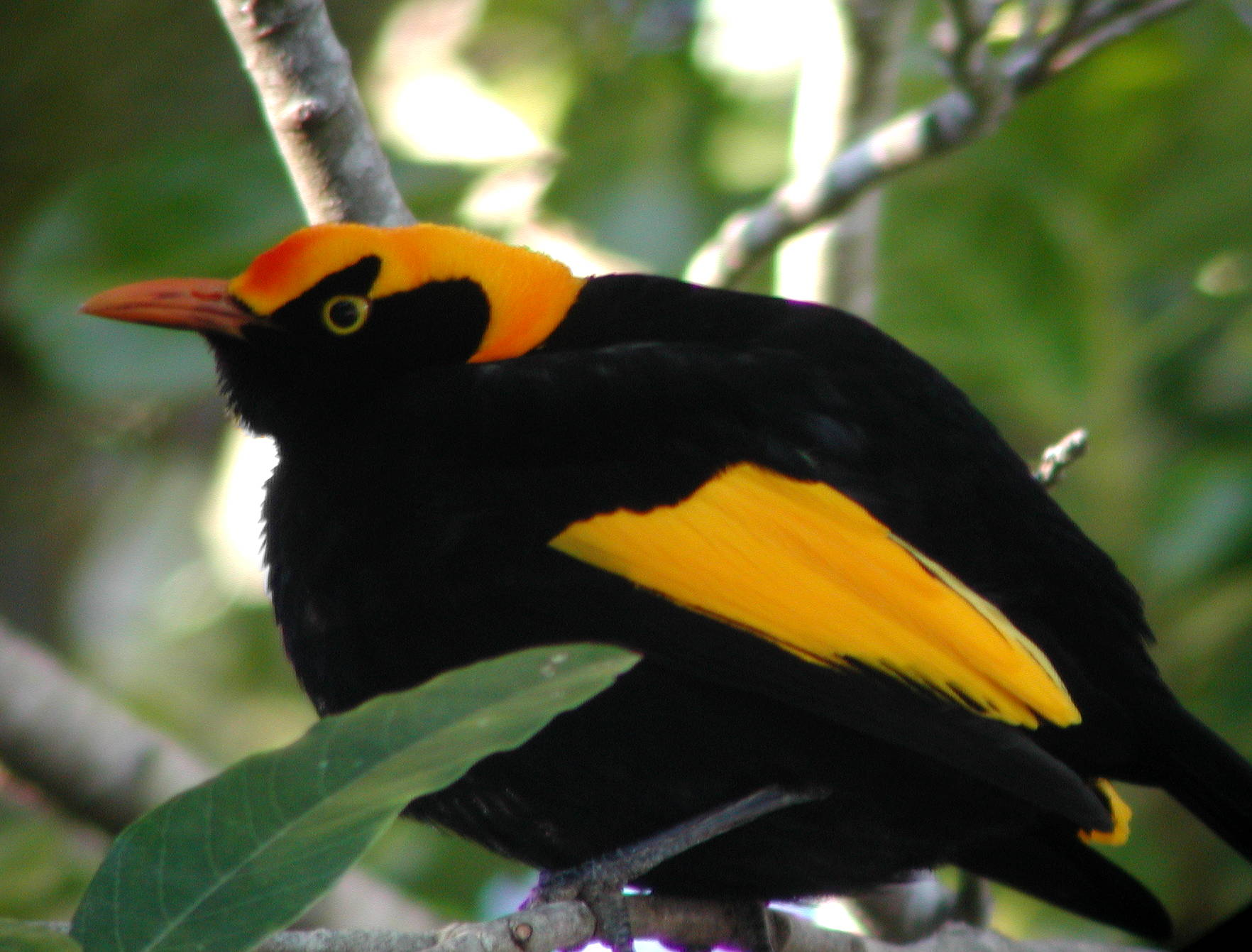
Regent bowerbird

The bowerbirds are small to medium-sized passerine birds. The males notably build a bower to attract a mate. Depending on the species, the bower ranges from a circle of cleared earth with a small pile of twigs in the center to a complex and highly decorated structure of sticks and leaves.

- Spotted catbird, Ailuroedus melanotis (E)
- Black-eared catbird, Ailuroedus melanotis
- Green catbird, Ailuroedus crassirostris
- Tooth-billed bowerbird, Scenopoeetes dentirostris (E)
- Golden bowerbird, Amblyornis newtoniana (E)
- Regent bowerbird, Sericulus chrysocephalus
- Satin bowerbird, Ptilonorhynchus violaceus
- Spotted bowerbird, Chlamydera maculata
- Great bowerbird, Chlamydera nuchalis
- Fawn-breasted bowerbird, Chlamydera cerviniventris

== Australasian treecreepers ==
Order: Passeriformes Family: Climacteridae

The Climacteridae are medium-small, mostly brown-coloured birds with patterning on their underparts.

- White-throated treecreeper, Cormobates leucophaea
- White-browed treecreeper, Climacteris affinis
- Red-browed treecreeper, Climacteris erythrops
- Brown treecreeper, Climacteris picumnus
- Black-tailed treecreeper, Climacteris melanurus

== Fairywrens ==
Order: Passeriformes Family: Maluridae

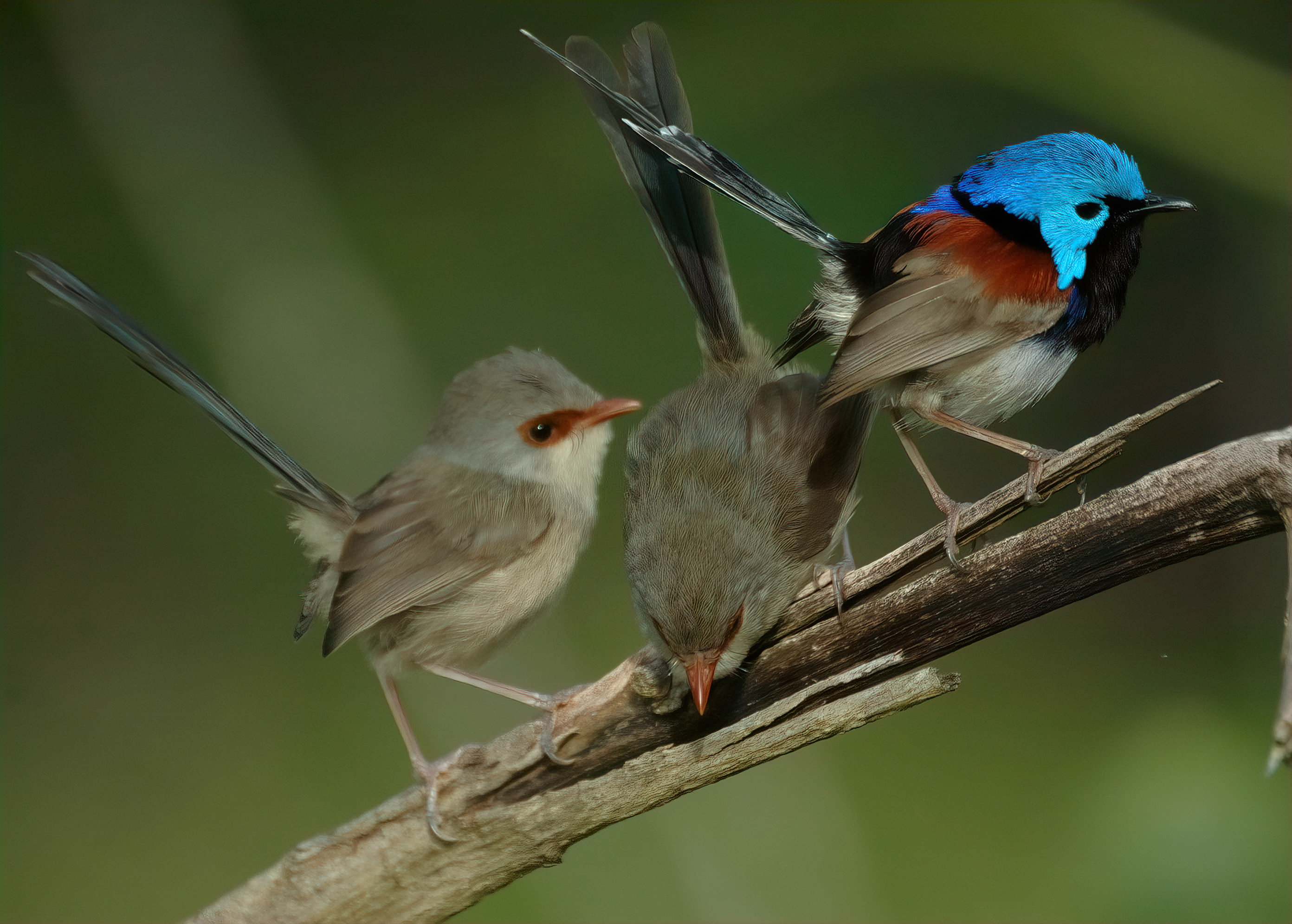
Variegated fairywrens

Maluridae is a family of small, insectivorous passerine birds endemic to Australia and New Guinea. They are socially monogamous and sexually promiscuous, meaning that although they form pairs between one male and one female, each partner will mate with other individuals and even assist in raising the young from such pairings.

- Grey grasswren, Amytornis barbatus
- Opalton grasswren, Amytornis rowleyi (E)
- Carpentarian grasswren, Amytornis dorotheae
- Short-tailed grasswren, Amytornis merrotsyi
- Eyrean grasswren, Amytornis goyderi
- Kalkadoon grasswren, Amytornis ballarae (E)
- Southern emuwren, Stipiturus malachurus
- Rufous-crowned emuwren, Stipiturus ruficeps
- Purple-crowned fairywren, Malurus coronatus
- Purple-backed fairywren, Malurus assimilis
- Variegated fairywren, Malurus lamberti
- Lovely fairywren, Malurus amabilis (E)
- Splendid fairywren, Malurus splendens
- Superb fairywren, Malurus cyaneus
- White-winged fairywren, Malurus leucopterus
- Red-backed fairywren, Malurus melanocephalus

== Honeyeaters ==
Order: Passeriformes Family: Meliphagidae

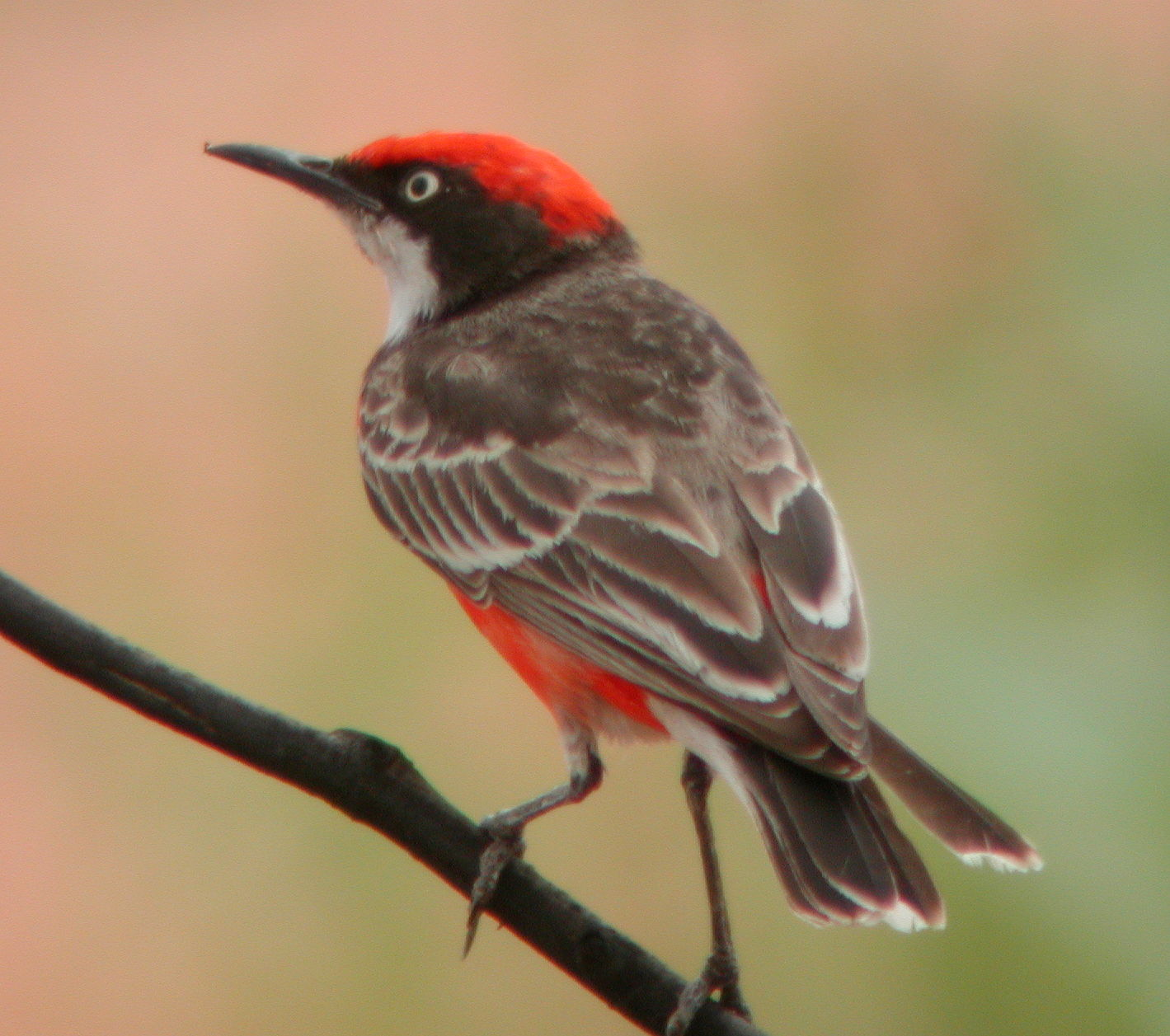
Male crimson chat

The honeyeaters are a large and diverse family of small to medium-sized birds most common in Australia and New Guinea. They are nectar feeders and closely resemble other nectar-feeding passerines.

- Eastern spinebill, Acanthorhynchus tenuirostris
- Pied honeyeater, Certhionyx variegatus
- Yellow-spotted honeyeater, Meliphaga notata (E)
- Lewin's honeyeater, Meliphaga lewinii
- Graceful honeyeater, Microptilotis gracilis
- Cryptic honeyeater, Microptilotis imitatrix (E)
- Yellow honeyeater, Stomiopera flava (E)
- White-gaped honeyeater, Stomiopera unicolor
- White-fronted honeyeater, Purnella albifrons
- Yellow-faced honeyeater, Caligavis chrysops
- Yellow-tufted honeyeater, Lichenostomus melanops
- Bell miner, Manorina melanophrys
- Noisy miner, Manorina melanocephala
- Yellow-throated miner, Manorina flavigula
- Bridled honeyeater, Bolemoreus frenatus (E)
- Eungella honeyeater, Bolemoreus hindwoodi (E)
- Spiny-cheeked honeyeater, Acanthagenys rufogularis
- Little wattlebird, Anthochaera chrysoptera
- Regent honeyeater, Anthochaera phrygia
- Red wattlebird, Anthochaera carunculata
- Varied honeyeater, Gavicalis versicolor
- Mangrove honeyeater, Gavicalis fasciogularis
- Singing honeyeater, Gavicalis virescens
- White-plumed honeyeater, Ptilotula penicillata
- Yellow-tinted honeyeater, Ptilotula flavescens
- Fuscous honeyeater, Ptilotula fusca
- Grey-headed honeyeater, Ptilotula keartlandi
- Grey-fronted honeyeater, Ptilotula plumula
- Brown-backed honeyeater, Ramsayornis modestus
- Bar-breasted honeyeater, Ramsayornis fasciatus (E)
- Rufous-banded honeyeater, Conopophila albogularis
- Rufous-throated honeyeater, Conopophila rufogularis
- Grey honeyeater, Conopophila whitei
- Gibber chat, Ashbyia lovensis
- Yellow chat, Epthianura crocea
- Crimson chat, Epthianura tricolor
- Orange chat, Epthianura aurifrons
- White-fronted chat, Epthianura albifrons
- Black honeyeater, Sugomel niger
- Dusky myzomela, Myzomela obscura
- Red-headed myzomela, Myzomela erythrocephala
- Scarlet myzomela, Myzomela sanguinolenta
- Green-backed honeyeater, Glycichaera fallax
- Banded honeyeater, Cissomela pectoralis
- Brown honeyeater, Lichmera indistincta
- New Holland honeyeater, Phylidonyris novaehollandiae
- White-cheeked honeyeater, Phylidonyris niger
- White-streaked honeyeater, Trichodere cockerelli (E)
- White-eared honeyeater, Nesoptilotis leucotis
- Blue-faced honeyeater, Entomyzon cyanotis
- White-throated honeyeater, Melithreptus albogularis
- White-naped honeyeater, Melithreptus lunatus
- Brown-headed honeyeater, Melithreptus brevirostris
- Black-chinned honeyeater, Melithreptus gularis
- Tawny-breasted honeyeater, Xanthotis flaviventer
- Macleay's honeyeater, Xanthotis macleayanus (E)
- Striped honeyeater, Plectorhyncha lanceolata
- Painted honeyeater, Grantiella picta
- Little friarbird, Philemon citreogularis
- Helmeted friarbird, Philemon buceroides
- Silver-crowned friarbird, Philemon argenticeps
- Noisy friarbird, Philemon corniculatus

== Bristlebirds ==
Order: Passeriformes Family: Dasyornithidae

Bristlebirds are long-tailed, sedentary, ground-frequenting birds. The common name of the family is derived from the presence of prominent rictal bristles - three stiff, hair-like feathers curving downwards on either side of the gape.

- Eastern bristlebird, Dasyornis brachypterus

== Pardalotes ==
Order: Passeriformes Family: Pardalotidae

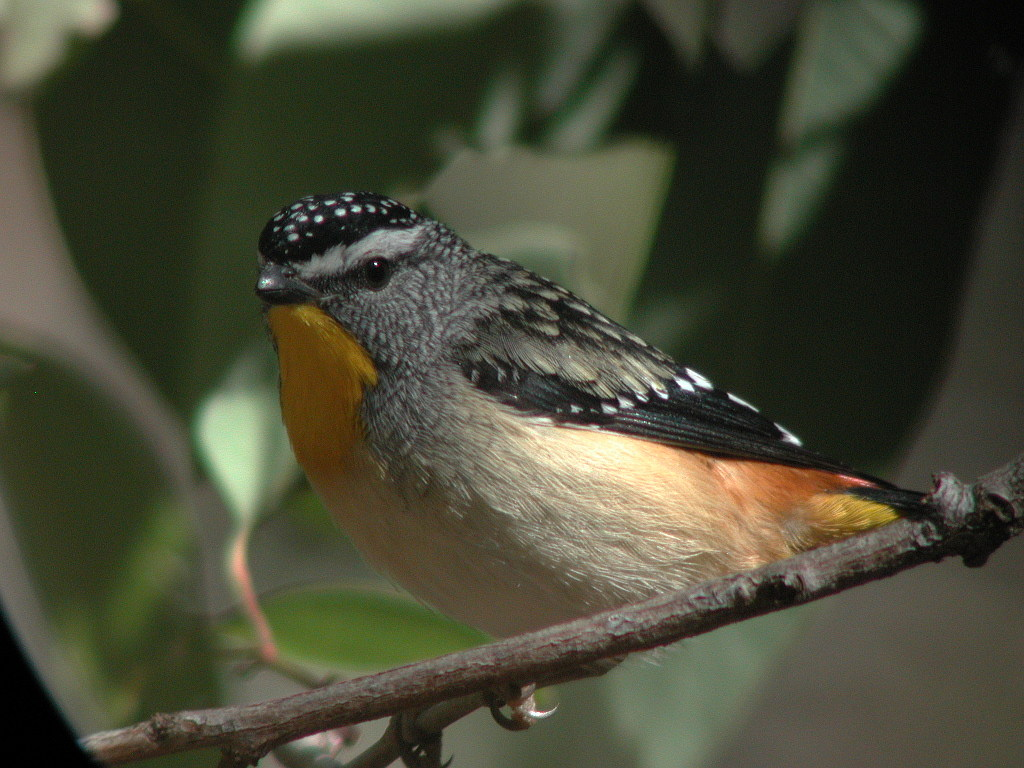
Spotted pardalote

Pardalotes spend most of their time high in the outer foliage of trees, feeding on insects, spiders, and above all lerps (a type of sap-sucking insect).

- Spotted pardalote, Pardalotus punctatus
- Red-browed pardalote, Pardalotus rubricatus
- Striated pardalote, Pardalotus striatus

== Thornbills and allies ==
Order: Passeriformes Family: Acanthizidae

Thornbills are small passerine birds, similar in habits to the tits.

- Fernwren, Oreoscopus gutturalis (E)
- Yellow-throated scrubwren, Sericornis citreogularis
- White-browed scrubwren, Sericornis frontalis
- Atherton scrubwren, Sericornis keri (E)
- Tropical scrubwren, Sericornis beccarii
- Large-billed scrubwren, Sericornis magnirostra
- Redthroat, Pyrrholaemus brunneus
- Speckled warbler, Pyrrholaemus sagittatus
- Rufous fieldwren, Calamanthus campestris
- Chestnut-rumped heathwren, Hylacola pyrrhopygia
- Buff-rumped thornbill, Acanthiza reguloides
- Mountain thornbill, Acanthiza katherina (E)
- Brown thornbill, Acanthiza pusilla
- Inland thornbill, Acanthiza apicalis
- Yellow-rumped thornbill, Acanthiza chrysorrhoa
- Chestnut-rumped thornbill, Acanthiza uropygialis
- Slaty-backed thornbill, Acanthiza robustirostris
- Yellow thornbill, Acanthiza nana
- Striated thornbill, Acanthiza lineata
- Weebill, Smicrornis brevirostris
- Fairy gerygone, Gerygone palpebrosa
- White-throated gerygone, Gerygone olivacea
- Large-billed gerygone, Gerygone magnirostris
- Brown gerygone, Gerygone mouki
- Western gerygone, Gerygone fusca
- Mangrove gerygone, Gerygone levigaster
- Southern whiteface, Aphelocephala leucopsis
- Banded whiteface, Aphelocephala nigricincta

== Pseudo-babblers ==
Order: Passeriformes Family: Pomatostomidae

The pseudo-babblers are small to medium-sized birds endemic to Australia and New Guinea. They are ground-feeding omnivores and highly social.

- Grey-crowned babbler, Pomatostomus temporalis
- White-browed babbler, Pomatostomus superciliosus
- Hall's babbler, Pomatostomus halli
- Chestnut-crowned babbler, Pomatostomus ruficeps

== Logrunners ==
Order: Passeriformes Family: Orthonychidae

The Orthonychidae is a family of birds with a single genus, Orthonyx, which comprises two types of passerine birds endemic to Australia and New Guinea, the logrunners and the chowchilla. Both use stiffened tails to brace themselves when feeding.

- Australian logrunner, Orthonyx temminckii
- Chowchilla, Orthonyx spaldingii (E)

== Quail-thrushes and jewel-babblers ==
Order: Passeriformes Family: Cinclosomatidae

The Cinclosomatidae is a family containing jewel-babblers and quail-thrushes.

- Spotted quail-thrush, Cinclosoma punctatum
- Chestnut-breasted quail-thrush, Cinclosoma castaneothorax
- Cinnamon quail-thrush, Cinclosoma cinnamomeum

== Cuckooshrikes ==
Order: Passeriformes Family: Campephagidae

The cuckooshrikes are small to medium-sized passerine birds. They are predominantly greyish with white and black, although some species are brightly coloured.

- Ground cuckooshrike, Coracina maxima
- Barred cuckooshrike, Coracina lineata
- Black-faced cuckooshrike, Coracina novaehollandiae
- White-bellied cuckooshrike, Coracina papuensis
- White-winged triller, Lalage tricolor
- Varied triller, Lalage leucomela
- Common cicadabird, Edolisoma tenuirostre

== Sittellas ==
Order: Passeriformes Family: Neosittidae

The sittellas are a family of small passerine birds found only in Australasia. They resemble treecreepers, but have soft tails.

- Papuan sittella, Neositta papuensis
- Varied sittella, Neositta chrysoptera

== Whipbirds and wedgebills ==
Order: Passeriformes Family: Psophodidae

The Psophodidae is a family containing whipbirds and wedgebills.

- Eastern whipbird, Psophodes olivaceus
- Chiming wedgebill, Psophodes occidentalis
- Chirruping wedgebill, Psophodes cristatus

== Australo-Papuan bellbirds ==
Order: Passeriformes Family: Oreoicidae

The three species contained in the family have been moved around between different families for fifty years. A series of studies of the DNA of Australian birds between 2006 and 2001 found strong support for treating the three genera as a new family, which was formally named in 2016.

- Crested bellbird, Oreoica gutturalis

== Shrike-tits ==
Order: Passeriformes Family: Falcunculidae

The shrike-tits have a parrot-like bill, used for distinctive bark-stripping behaviour, which gains it access to invertebrates

- Eastern shrike-tit, Falcunculus frontatus

== Whistlers and allies ==
Order: Passeriformes Family: Pachycephalidae

The family Pachycephalidae includes the whistlers, shrikethrushes, and some of the pitohuis.

- Sandstone shrikethrush, Colluricincla woodwardi
- Bower's shrikethrush, Colluricincla boweri (E)
- Grey shrikethrush, Colluricincla harmonica
- Rufous shrikethrush, Colluricincla rufogaster
- Olive whistler, Pachycephala olivacea
- Golden whistler, Pachycephala pectoralis
- Black-tailed whistler, Pachycephala melanura
- Grey whistler, Pachycephala simplex
- Rufous whistler, Pachycephala rufiventris
- White-breasted whistler, Pachycephala lanioides

== Old World orioles ==
Order: Passeriformes Family: Oriolidae

The Old World orioles are colourful passerine birds. They are not related to the New World orioles.

- Olive-backed oriole, Oriolus sagittatus
- Green oriole, Oriolus flavocinctus
- Australasian figbird, Sphecotheres vieilloti

== Boatbills ==
Order: Passeriformes Family: Machaerirhynchidae

The boatbills have affinities to woodswallows and butcherbirds, and are distributed across New Guinea and northern Queensland.

- Yellow-breasted boatbill, Machaerirhynchus flaviventer

== Woodswallows, bellmagpies, and allies ==
Order: Passeriformes Family: Artamidae

The woodswallows are soft-plumaged, somber-coloured passerine birds. They are smooth, agile flyers with moderately large, semi-triangular wings. The cracticids: currawongs, bellmagpies and butcherbirds, are similar to the other corvids. They have large, straight bills and mostly black, white or grey plumage. All are omnivorous to some degree.

- White-breasted woodswallow, Artamus leucorynchus
- Masked woodswallow, Artamus personatus
- White-browed woodswallow, Artamus superciliosus
- Black-faced woodswallow, Artamus cinereus
- Dusky woodswallow, Artamus cyanopterus
- Little woodswallow, Artamus minor
- Black-backed butcherbird, Cracticus mentalis
- Grey butcherbird, Cracticus torquatus
- Pied butcherbird, Cracticus nigrogularis
- Black butcherbird, Cracticus quoyi
- Australian magpie, Gymnorhina tibicen
- Pied currawong, Strepera graculina

== Fantails ==
Order: Passeriformes Family: Rhipiduridae

The fantails are small insectivorous birds which are specialist aerial feeders.

- Northern fantail, Rhipidura rufiventris
- Willie wagtail, Rhipidura leucophrys
- Rufous fantail, Rhipidura rufifrons
- Arafura fantail, Rhipidura dryas
- Grey fantail, Rhipidura albiscapa
- Mangrove fantail, Rhipidura phasiana

== Drongos ==
Order: Passeriformes Family: Dicruridae

The drongos are mostly black or dark grey in colour, sometimes with metallic tints. They have long forked tails, and some Asian species have elaborate tail decorations. They have short legs and sit very upright when perched, like a shrike. They flycatch or take prey from the ground.

- Spangled drongo, Dicrurus bracteatus

== Birds-of-Paradise ==
Order: Passeriformes Family: Paradisaeidae

The birds-of-paradise are best known for the striking plumage possessed by the males of most species, in particular highly elongated and elaborate feathers extending from the tail, wings or head. These plumes are used in courtship displays to attract females.

- Trumpet manucode, Manucodia keraudrenii
- Paradise riflebird, Ptiloris paradiseus
- Victoria's riflebird, Ptiloris victoriae (E)
- Magnificent riflebird, Ptiloris magnificus

== Monarch flycatchers ==
Order: Passeriformes Family: Monarchidae

The monarch flycatchers are small to medium-sized insectivorous passerines which hunt by flycatching.

- White-eared monarch, Carterornis leucotis
- Black-faced monarch, Monarcha melanopsis
- Black-winged monarch, Monarcha frater
- Spectacled monarch, Symposiachrus trivirgatus
- Frill-necked monarch, Arses lorealis (E)
- Pied monarch, Arses kaupi
- Magpie-lark, Grallina cyanoleuca
- Leaden flycatcher, Myiagra rubecula
- Broad-billed flycatcher, Myiagra ruficollis
- Satin flycatcher, Myiagra cyanoleuca
- Restless flycatcher, Myiagra inquieta
- Paperbark flycatcher, Myiagra nana
- Shining flycatcher, Myiagra alecto

== White-winged chough and apostlebird ==
Order: Passeriformes Family: Corcoracidae

They are found in open habitat in eastern Australia, mostly open eucalypt woodlands and some forest that lacks a closed canopy. They are highly social, spend much of their time foraging through leaf litter with a very distinctive gait, calling to one another almost constantly

- White-winged chough, Corcorax melanorhamphos
- Apostlebird, Struthidea cinerea

== Crows, jays, and magpies ==
Order: Passeriformes Family: Corvidae

The family Corvidae includes crows, ravens, jays, choughs, magpies, treepies, nutcrackers and ground jays. Corvids are above average in size among the Passeriformes, and some of the larger species show high levels of intelligence.

- House crow, Corvus splendens (A)
- Torresian crow, Corvus orru
- Little crow, Corvus bennetti
- Australian raven, Corvus coronoides
- Little raven, Corvus mellori (A)
- Forest raven, Corvus tasmanicus

== Australasian robins ==
Order: Passeriformes Family: Petroicidae

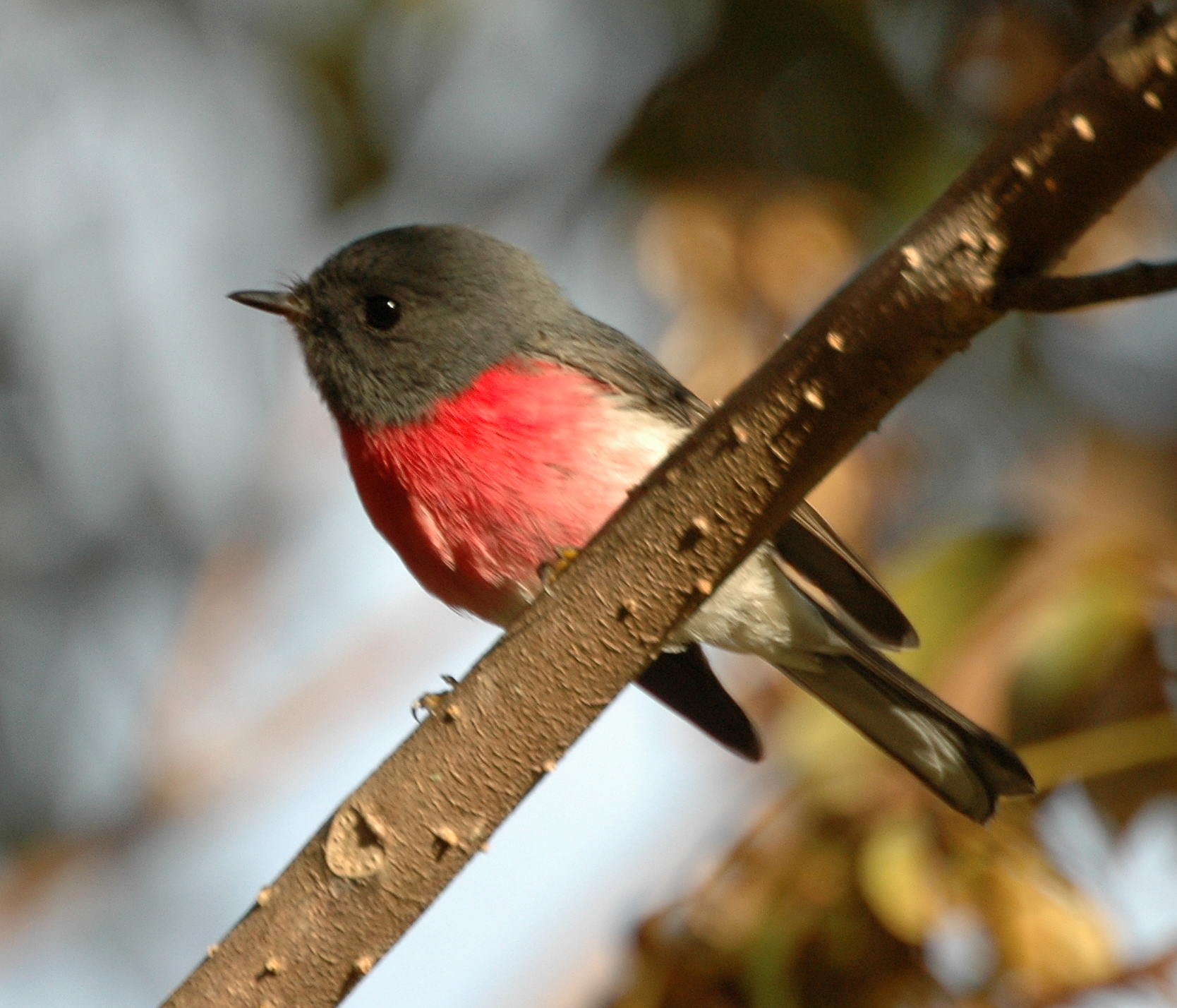
Male rose robin

Most species of Petroicidae have a stocky build with a large rounded head, a short straight bill and rounded wingtips. They occupy a wide range of wooded habitats, from subalpine to tropical rainforest, and mangrove swamp to semi-arid scrubland. All are primarily insectivores, although a few supplement their diet with seeds.

- Jacky-winter, Microeca fascinans
- Lemon-bellied flycatcher, Microeca flavigaster
- Yellow-legged flycatcher, Microeca griseoceps
- Scarlet robin, Petroica multicolor
- Flame robin, Petroica phoenicea (A)
- Rose robin, Petroica rosea
- Red-capped robin, Petroica goodenovii
- Hooded robin, Melanodryas cucullata
- White-faced robin, Tregellasia leucops
- Pale-yellow robin, Tregellasia capito
- Eastern yellow robin, Eopsaltria australis
- Mangrove robin, Eopsaltria pulverulenta
- White-browed robin, Poecilodryas superciliosa (E)
- Buff-sided robin, Poecilodryas cerviniventris
- Ashy robin, Heteromyias albispecularis
- Grey-headed robin, Heteromyias cinereifrons (E)
- Northern scrub robin, Drymodes superciliaris (E)

== Larks ==
Order: Passeriformes Family: Alaudidae

Larks are small terrestrial birds with often extravagant songs and display flights. Most larks are fairly dull in appearance. Their food is insects and seeds.

- Horsfield's bushlark, Mirafra javanica

== Cisticolas and allies ==
Order: Passeriformes Family: Cisticolidae

The Cisticolidae are warblers found mainly in warmer southern regions of the Old World. They are generally very small birds of drab brown or grey appearance found in open country such as grassland or scrub.

- Zitting cisticola, Cisticola juncidis
- Golden-headed cisticola, Cisticola exilis

== Reed warblers and allies ==
Order: Passeriformes Family: Acrocephalidae

The members of this family are usually rather large for "warblers". Most are rather plain olivaceous brown above with much yellow to beige below. They are usually found in open woodland, reedbeds, or tall grass. The family occurs mostly in southern to western Eurasia and surroundings, but it also ranges far into the Pacific, with some species in Africa.

- Oriental reed warbler, Acrocephalus orientalis (A)
- Australian reed warbler, Acrocephalus australis

== Grassbirds and allies ==
Order: Passeriformes Family: Locustellidae

Locustellidae are a family of small insectivorous songbirds found mainly in Eurasia, Africa, and the Australian region. They are smallish birds with tails that are usually long and pointed, and tend to be drab brownish or buffy all over.

- Spinifexbird, Poodytes carteri
- Little grassbird, Poodytes gramineus
- Brown songlark, Cincloramphus cruralis
- Rufous songlark, Cincloramphus mathewsi
- Tawny grassbird, Cincloramphus timoriensis

== Swallows ==
Order: Passeriformes Family: Hirundinidae

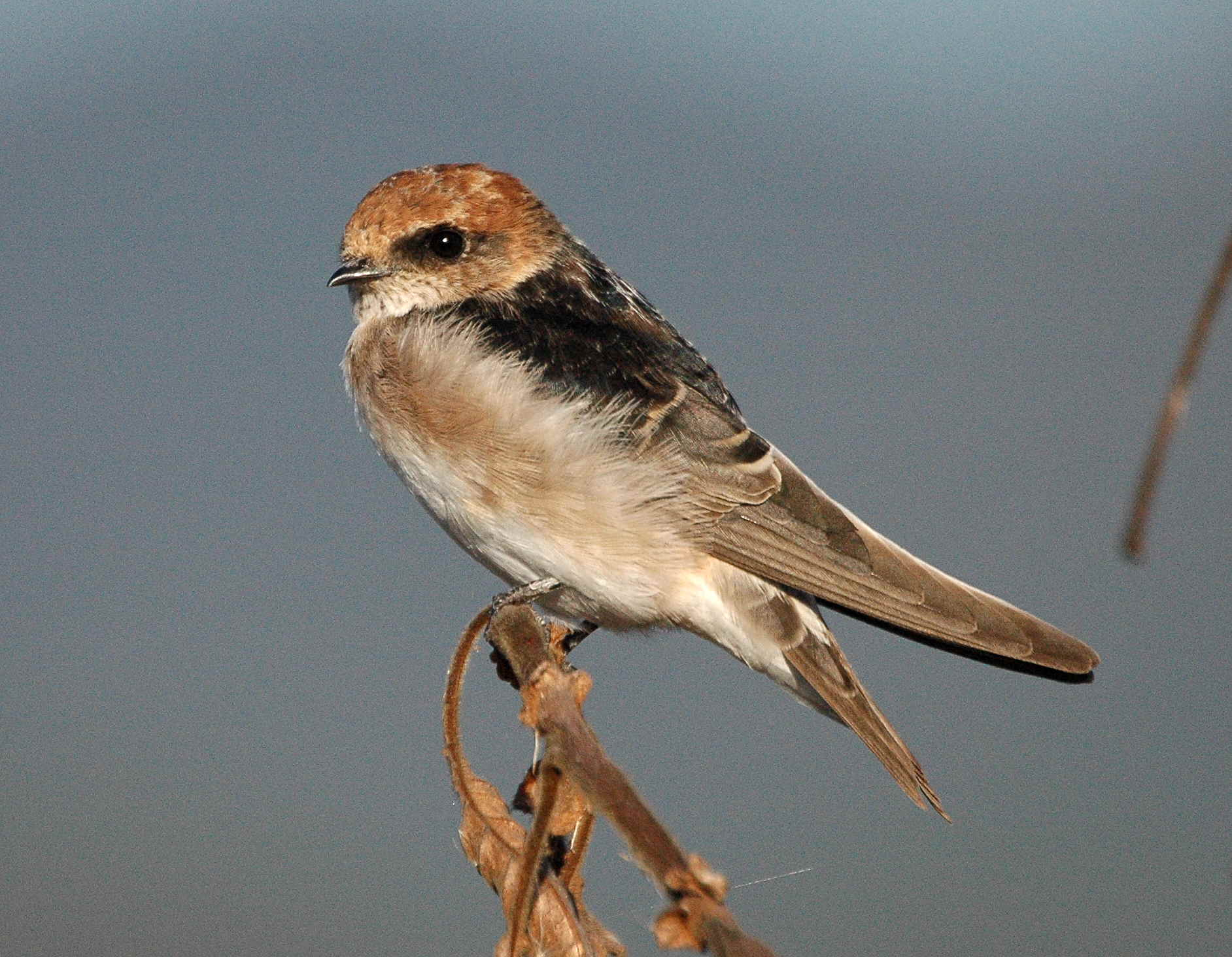
Fairy martin

The family Hirundinidae is adapted to aerial feeding. They have a slender streamlined body, long pointed wings, and a short bill with a wide gape. The feet are adapted to perching rather than walking, and the front toes are partially joined at the base.

- Barn swallow, Hirundo rustica
- Welcome swallow, Hirundo neoxena
- Eastern red-rumped swallow, Cecropis daurica (A)
- Fairy martin, Petrochelidon ariel
- Tree martin, Petrochelidon nigricans
- White-backed swallow, Cheramoeca leucosterna

== Bulbuls ==
Order: Passeriformes Family: Pycnonotidae

Bulbuls are medium-sized songbirds. Some are colourful with yellow, red or orange vents, cheeks, throats or supercilia, but most are drab, with uniform olive-brown to black plumage. Some species have distinct crests.

- Red-whiskered bulbul, Pycnonotus jocosus (I)

== White-eyes, yuhinas, and allies ==
Order: Passeriformes Family: Zosteropidae

The white-eyes are small birds of rather drab appearance, the plumage above being typically greenish-olive, but some species have a white or bright yellow throat, breast, or lower parts, and several have buff flanks. As the name suggests, many species have a white ring around each eye.

- Lemon-bellied white-eye, Zosterops chloris
- Ashy-bellied white-eye, Zosterops citrinella
- Australian yellow white-eye, Zosterops luteus
- Silver-eye, Zosterops lateralis

== Starlings ==
Order: Passeriformes Family: Sturnidae

Starlings are small to medium-sized passerine birds. Their flight is strong and direct and they are very gregarious. Their preferred habitat is fairly open country. They eat insects and fruit. Plumage is typically dark with a metallic sheen.

- Metallic starling, Aplonis metallica
- Singing starling, Aplonis cantoroides
- Common starling, Sturnus vulgaris (I)
- Common myna, Acridotheres tristis (I)

== Thrushes and allies ==
Order: Passeriformes Family: Turdidae

The thrushes are a group of passerine birds that occur mainly in the Old World. They are plump, soft plumaged, small to medium-sized insectivores or sometimes omnivores, often feeding on the ground. Many have attractive songs.

- Bassian thrush, Zoothera lunulata
- Russet-tailed thrush, Zoothera heinei
- Common blackbird, Turdus merula
- Eyebrowed thrush, Turdus obscurus (A)

== Old World flycatchers ==
Order: Passeriformes Family: Muscicapidae

Old World flycatchers are a large group of small arboreal insectivores. The appearance of these birds is highly varied, but they mostly have weak songs and harsh calls.

- Blue rock thrush, Monticola solitarius (A)
- Isabelline wheatear, Oenanthe isabellina (A)

== Flowerpeckers ==
Order: Passeriformes Family: Dicaeidae

The flowerpeckers are very small, stout, often brightly coloured birds, with short tails, short thick curved bills, and tubular tongues.

- Red-capped flowerpecker, Dicaeum geelvinkianum
- Mistletoebird, Dicaeum hirundinaceum

== Sunbirds and spiderhunters ==
Order: Passeriformes Family: Nectariniidae

The sunbirds and spiderhunters are very small passerine birds which feed largely on nectar, although they will also take insects, especially when feeding young. Their flight is fast and direct on short wings. Most species can take nectar by hovering like a hummingbird, but usually perch to feed.

- Sahul sunbird, Cinnyris frenatus

== Waxbills and allies ==
Order: Passeriformes Family: Estrildidae

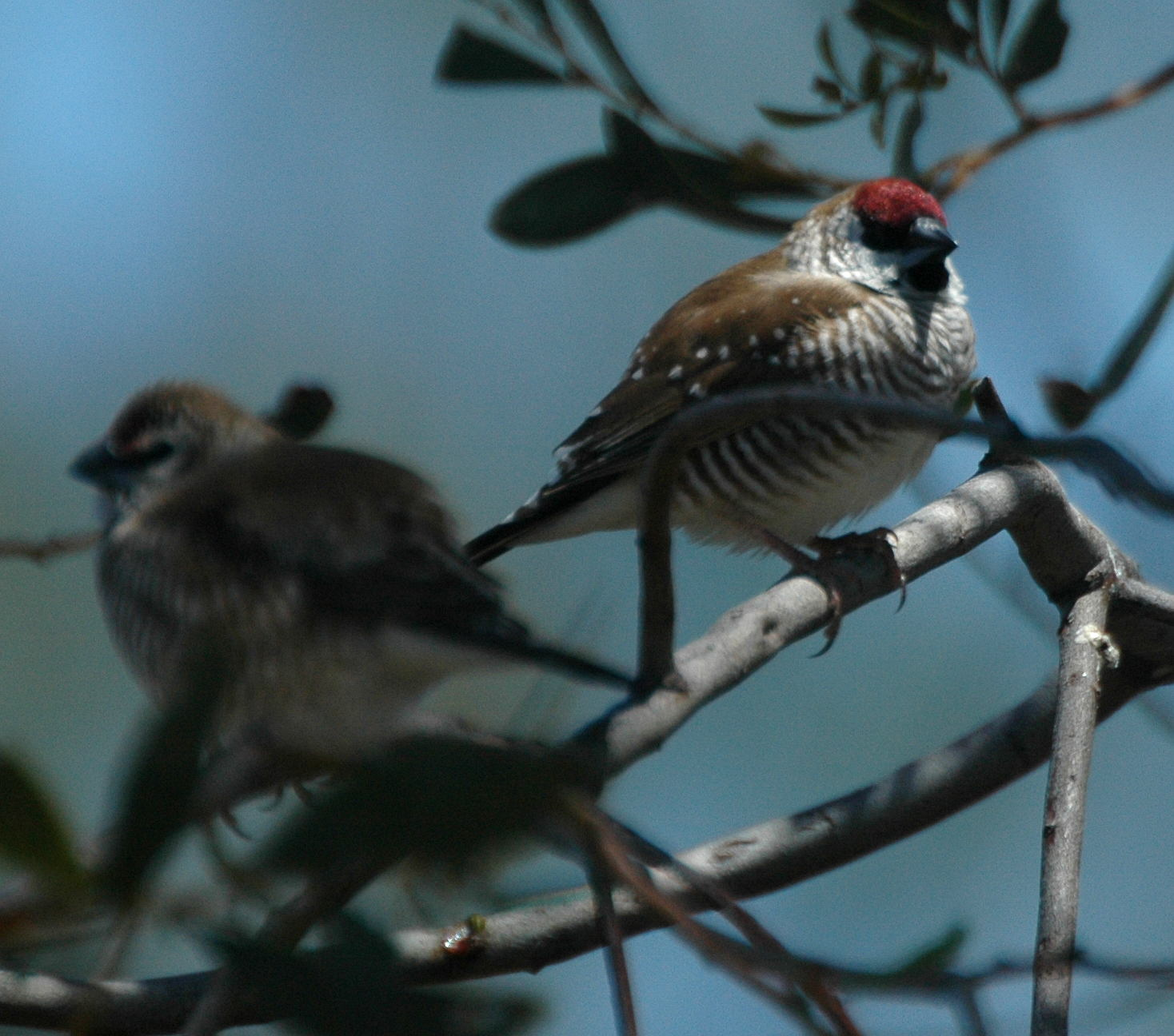
Plum-headed finch

The estrildid finches are small passerine birds of the Old World tropics and Australasia. They are gregarious and often colonial seed eaters with short thick but pointed bills. They are all similar in structure and habits, but have wide variation in plumage colours and patterns.

- Painted firetail, Emblema pictum
- Diamond firetail, Stagonopleura guttata
- Red-browed firetail, Neochmia temporalis
- Crimson finch, Neochmia phaeton
- Star finch, Bathilda ruficauda
- Plum-headed finch, Aidemosyne modesta
- Zebra finch, Taeniopygia guttata
- Double-barred finch, Stizoptera bichenovii
- Masked finch, Poephila personata
- Long-tailed finch, Poephila acuticauda
- Black-throated finch, Poephila cincta
- Blue-faced parrotfinch, Erythrura trichroa
- Gouldian finch, Chloebia gouldiae
- Scaly-breasted munia, Lonchura punctulata (I)
- Chestnut-breasted munia, Lonchura castaneothorax
- Pictorella munia, Heteromunia pectoralis

== Old World sparrows ==
Order: Passeriformes Family: Passeridae

Old World sparrows are small passerine birds, typically small, plump, brown or grey with short tails and short powerful beaks. They are seed-eaters, but also consume small insects.

- House sparrow, Passer domesticus (I)
- Eurasian tree sparrow, Passer montanus (I)

== Wagtails and pipits ==
Order: Passeriformes Family: Motacillidae

Motacillidae is a family of small passerine birds with medium to long tails and comprises the wagtails, longclaws, and pipits. These are slender ground-feeding insectivores of open country.

- Grey wagtail, Motacilla cinerea (A)
- Eastern yellow wagtail, Motacilla tschutschensis (A)
- White wagtail, Motacilla alba (A)
- Australian pipit, Anthus australis

== Finches, euphonias, and allies ==
Order: Passeriformes Family: Fringillidae

Finches are small to moderately large seed-eating passerine birds with a strong beak, usually conical and in some species very large. All have 12 tail feathers and nine primary flight feathers. Finches have a bouncing flight, alternating bouts of flapping with gliding on closed wings, and most sing well.

- European greenfinch, Chloris chloris (I)
- European goldfinch, Carduelis carduelis (I)

== See also ==
- List of birds
- Lists of birds by region
- List of birds of Australia
