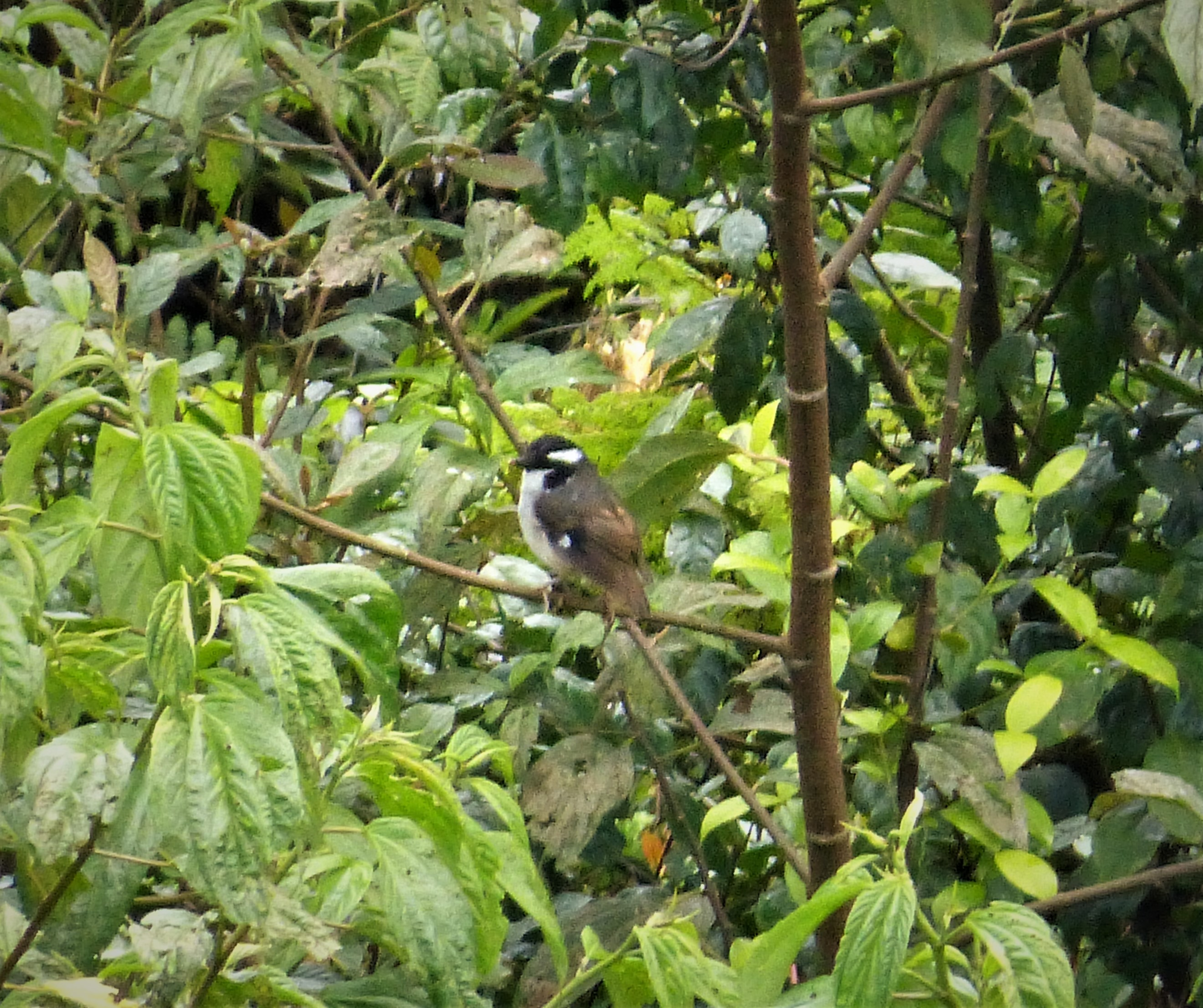

Conservation status
- Least Concern (IUCN 3.1)

Scientific classification
- Kingdom: Animalia
- Phylum: Chordata
- Class: Aves
- Order: Passeriformes
- Family: Petroicidae
- Genus: Heteromyias
- Species: H. armiti

Binomial name
- Heteromyias armiti (De Vis, 1894)

= Black-capped robin =

Species of bird

The black-capped robin (Heteromyias armiti) is a species of bird in the family Petroicidae native to New Guinea. The black-capped robin has been split from the ashy robin (Heteromyias albispecularis) .
