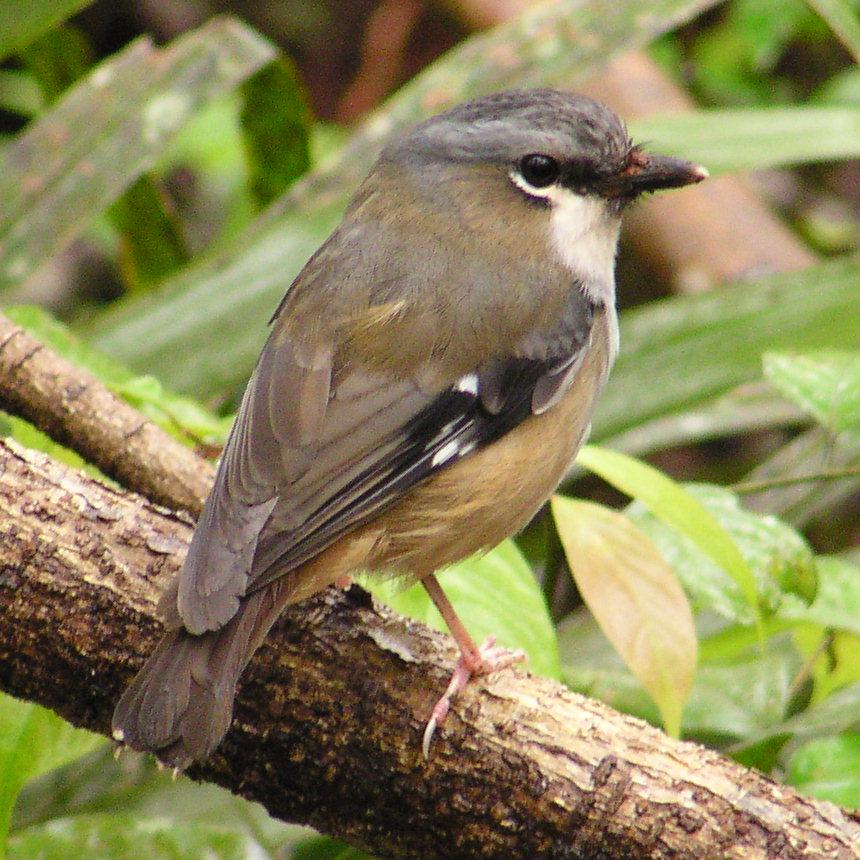
- Grey-headed robin (Heteromyias cinereifrons)

Scientific classification
- Kingdom: Animalia
- Phylum: Chordata
- Class: Aves
- Order: Passeriformes
- Family: Petroicidae
- Genus: Heteromyias; Sharpe, 1879

Type species
- Poecilodryas cinereifrons Ramsay, 1876

Species
- 3; see text

= Heteromyias =

Genus of birds

Heteromyias is a genus of passerine birds in the Australasian robin family Petroicidae.

The genus was introduced by the English zoologist Richard Bowdler Sharpe in 1879 with the grey-headed robin (Heteromyias cinereifrons) as the type species. The name of the genus combines the Ancient Greek heteros "different" and the Modern Latin myias "flycatcher".

== Species ==
The genus contains three species:

Image	Scientific name	Common name	Distribution
	Heteromyias cinereifrons	Grey-headed robin	Queensland, Australia
	Heteromyias albispecularis	Ashy robin	New Guinea.
	Heteromyias armiti	Black-capped robin	New Guinea
