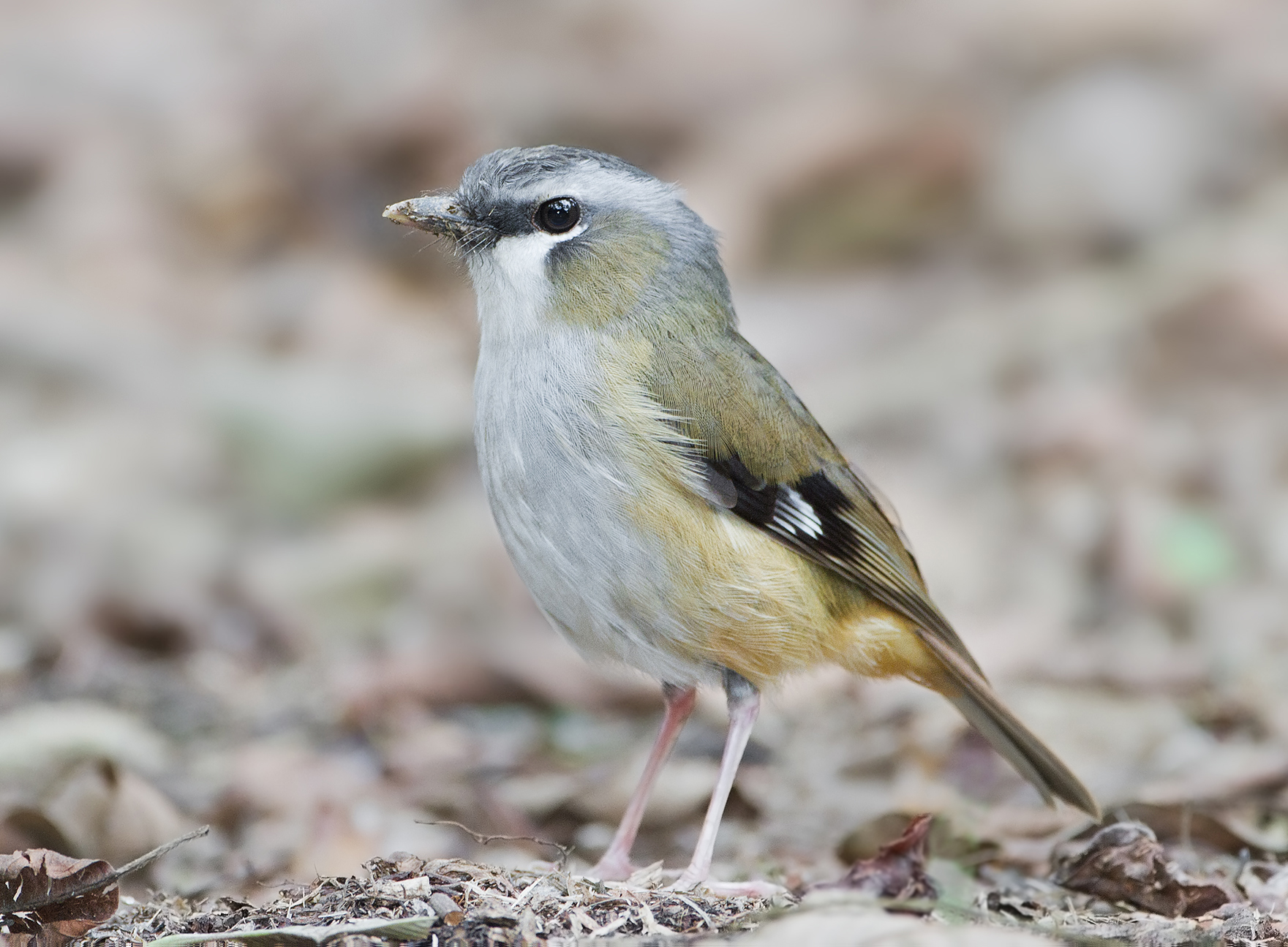

Conservation status
- Near Threatened (IUCN 3.1)

Scientific classification
- Kingdom: Animalia
- Phylum: Chordata
- Class: Aves
- Order: Passeriformes
- Family: Petroicidae
- Genus: Heteromyias
- Species: H. cinereifrons

Binomial name
- Heteromyias cinereifrons (Ramsay, 1876)
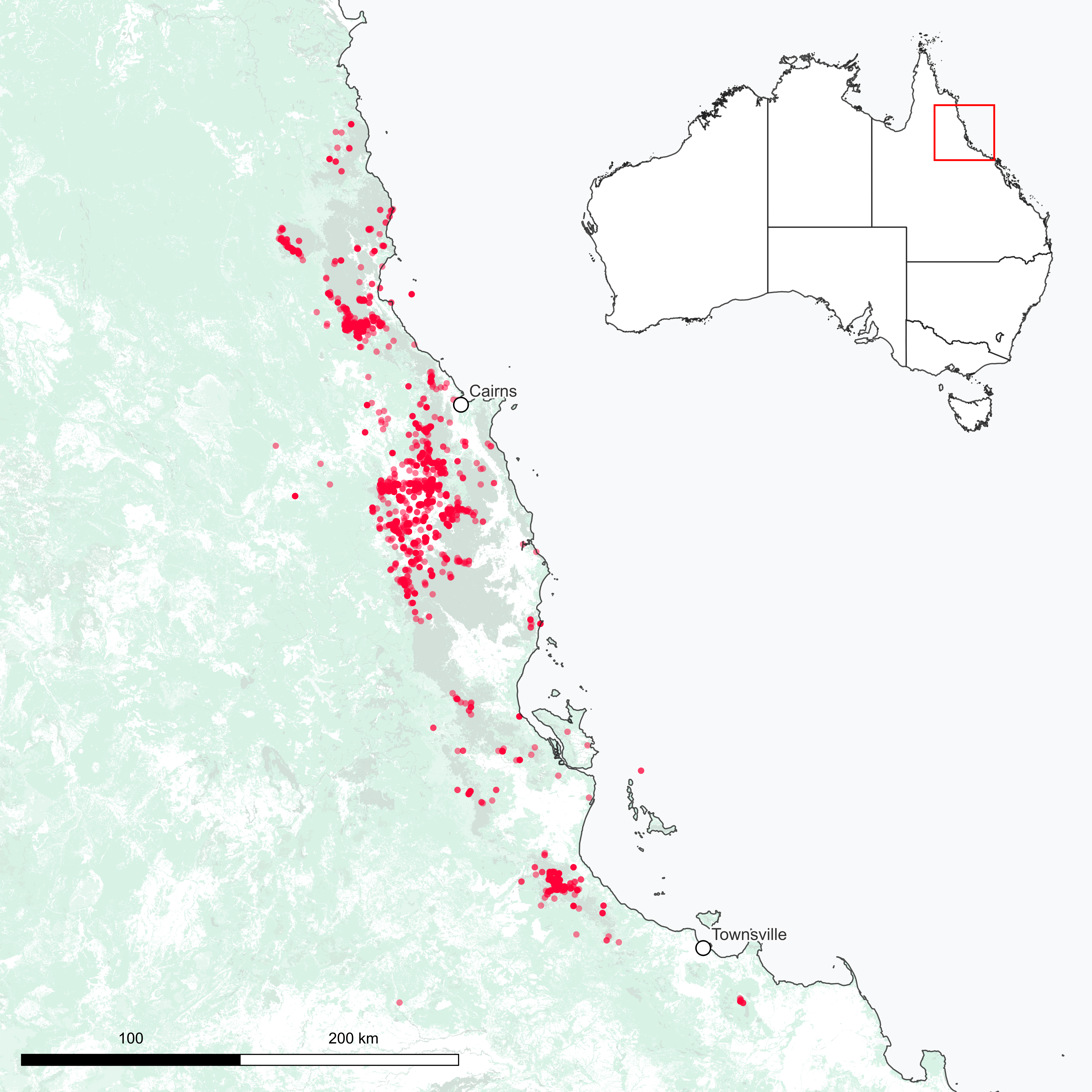
- Species distribution

Synonyms
- Heteromyias albispecularis (Salvadori, 1876); Poecilodryas cinereifrons

= Grey-headed robin =

Species of bird

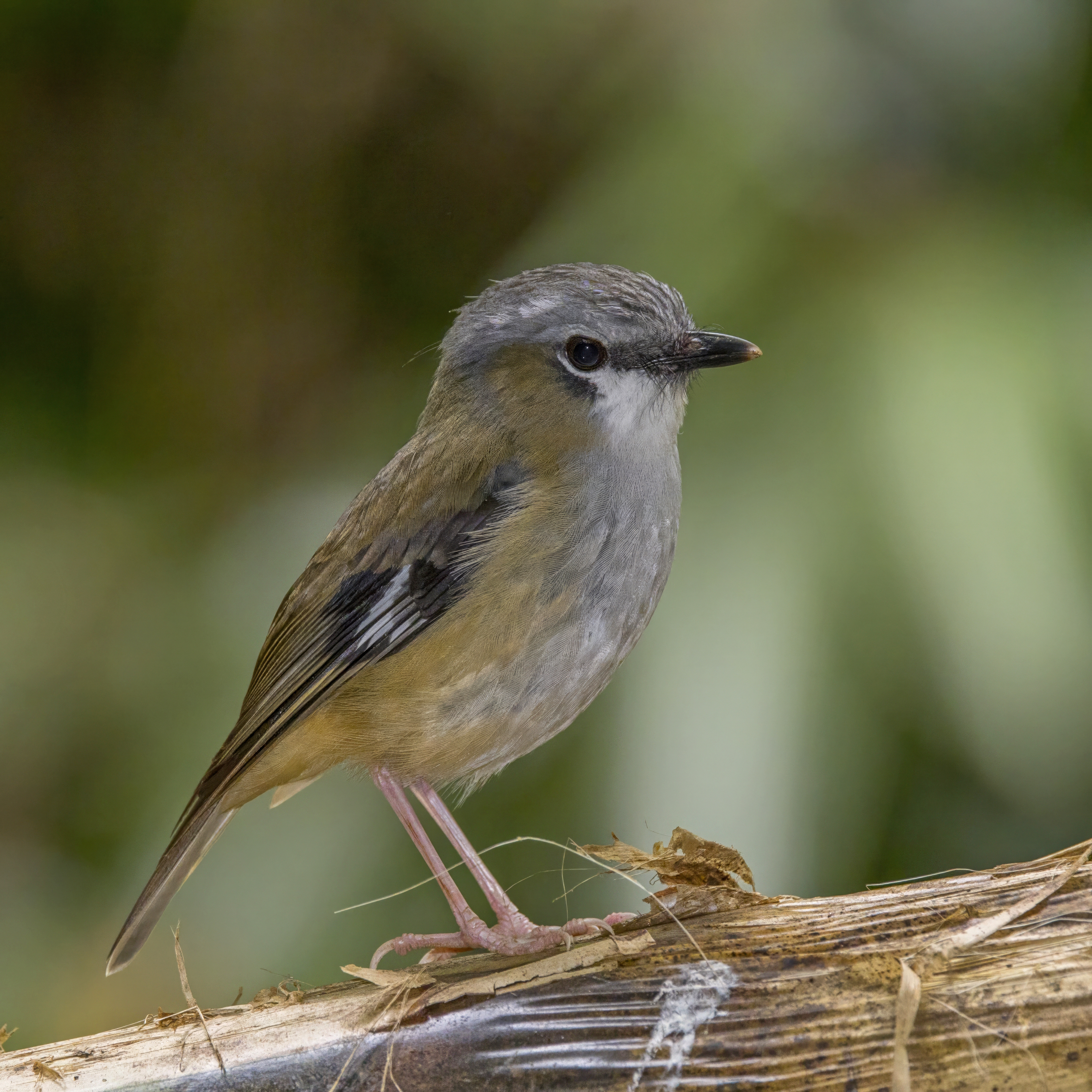
In the Atherton Tableland

The grey-headed robin (Heteromyias cinereifrons) is a species of bird in the family Petroicidae. It is found in northeastern Queensland, Australia.

== Taxonomy ==
It is one of two species within the genus Heteromyias. Previously, it and the ashy robin from New Guinea were treated as one species and known as Heteromyias albispecularis. Described by Australian naturalist Edward Pierson Ramsay in 1876, the grey-headed robin is a member of the Australasian robin family Petroicidae. Sibley and Ahlquist's DNA-DNA hybridisation studies placed this group in a Corvida parvorder comprising many tropical and Australian passerines, including pardalotes, fairy-wrens, honeyeaters, and crows. However, subsequent molecular research (and current consensus) places the robins as a very early offshoot of the Passerida, or "advanced" songbirds, within the songbird lineage.

== Description ==
The grey-headed robin has, as its name suggests, a grey crown and lores, white throat and olive-brown ear coverts and upperparts, with a white patch on the wings. The underparts are pale, the breast is pale grey, and the belly white. The bill and eyes are dark brown.

== Distribution and habitat ==
It is endemic to Queensland in Australia. The range in Australia is from Cardwell to the Bloomfield River in northeastern Queensland. Its natural habitats are subtropical or tropical moist lowland forests and subtropical or tropical moist montane forests.

== Behaviour ==
=== Breeding ===
Breeding occurs from August or September to January, with one or two broods per season. The nest is a shallow cup made of bark, grass, and dry leaves. Spider webs are used for binding or filling, and strips of fern and palm for lining; the outside is decorated by dried vegetation. The nest is generally placed in a lawyer vine up to 10 m (30 ft) above the ground. A clutch of one or two eggs is laid. The eggs are buff, cream- or dark greenish-white, and marked with light brown splotches and spots, usually concentrated around the large end, and they measure 26 by 19 mm.
