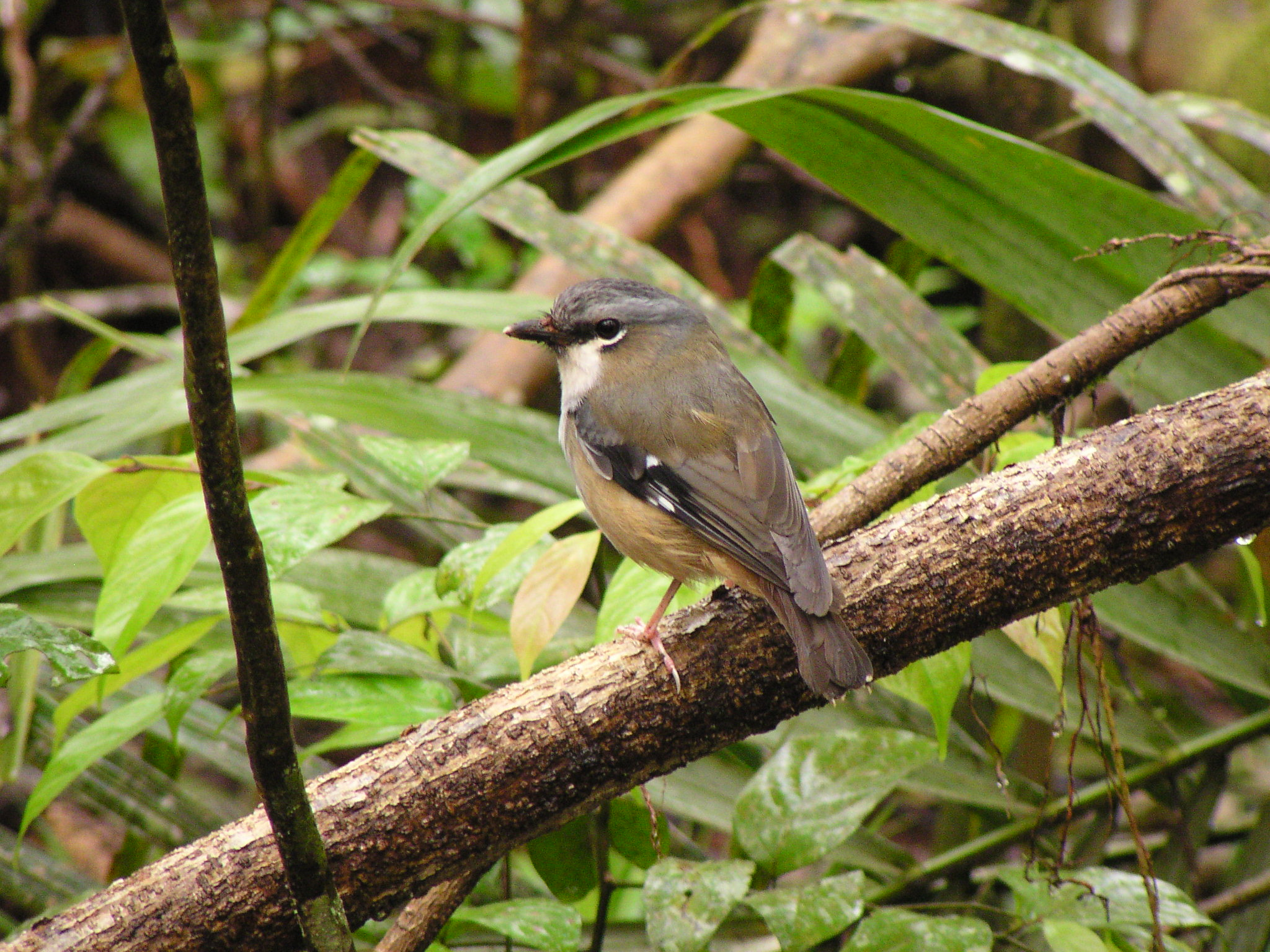

Conservation status
- Least Concern (IUCN 3.1)

Scientific classification
- Kingdom: Animalia
- Phylum: Chordata
- Class: Aves
- Order: Passeriformes
- Family: Petroicidae
- Genus: Heteromyias
- Species: H. albispecularis

Binomial name
- Heteromyias albispecularis (Salvadori, 1876)

Synonyms
- Poecilodryas albispecularis

= Ashy robin =

Species of bird

The ashy robin (Heteromyias albispecularis), also known as the black-cheeked robin, is a species of bird in the family Petroicidae native to New Guinea.

== Taxonomy ==
It is one of three species within the genus Heteromyias. Previously, it and the grey-headed robin from Australia were treated as one species and known as Heteromyias albispecularis. The black-capped robin (H. armiti) was formerly considered a subspecies of H. albispecularis, but more recent studies indicate it is a distinct species, and it has been split from it (the subspecies H. a. rothschildi has also been carried over to armiti). It has also been classified within the genus Poecilodryas.

Described by Italian naturalist, Tommaso Salvadori, in 1874, the ashy robin is a member of the Australasian robin family Petroicidae. Sibley and Ahlquist's DNA-DNA hybridisation studies placed this group in a Corvida parvorder comprising many tropical and Australian passerines, including pardalotes, fairy-wrens, honeyeaters, and crows. However, subsequent molecular research (and current consensus) places the robins as a very early offshoot of the Passerida (or "advanced" songbirds), within the songbird lineage.

== Description ==
Measuring 15 to 18 cm (5.9 to 7.1 in), the ashy robin is a large and solidly built robin. It has a sooty black head and cheeks, with a white stripe extending backwards and upwards from the eyes. It has a white throat darkening to buff underparts and olive-brown upperparts. There is a white patch on the otherwise dark-plumaged wing. The bill is grey-black, the eyes are dark brown, and the legs pale pink.

== Distribution and habitat ==
The ashy robin is found across the mountain ranges of New Guinea (in both West Papua and Papua New Guinea) from 1,400 to 2,600 m (4,600 to 8,500 ft). Within the rainforest it is found singly or occasionally in pairs in the understory or on the ground.

== Behaviour ==
=== Feeding ===
It is insectivorous, and hunts by gleaning or snatching, often on the ground. Among its prey are ants, beetles, phasmids, centipedes, and earthworms.

=== Breeding ===
The nest is a shallow cup made of bark, grass, twigs, and dry leaves. Spider webs are used for binding or filling. The nest is generally placed in cover 1–3 m (3.3–9.8 ft) above the ground. The clutch consists of a single cream- or olive-white egg, marked with light brown or mauve splotches and spots, usually concentrated around the large end. The egg measures 24 by 20 mm in size.
