= Bronzewing =

Bronzewing may refer to:

== Birds ==
- Bronzewing pigeon, a group of pigeons native to Australia
- Brush bronzewing, species of bird in the pigeon family
- Common bronzewing, species of bird in the pigeon family
- Crested bronzewing, species of bird in the pigeon family
- Flock bronzewing, species of bird in the pigeon family
- New Britain bronzewing, species of bird in the pigeon family
- New Guinea bronzewing, species of bird in the pigeon family

== Places ==
- Bronzewing Gold Mine, a gold mine in Western Australia
