= Bronzewing pigeon =

Group of birds

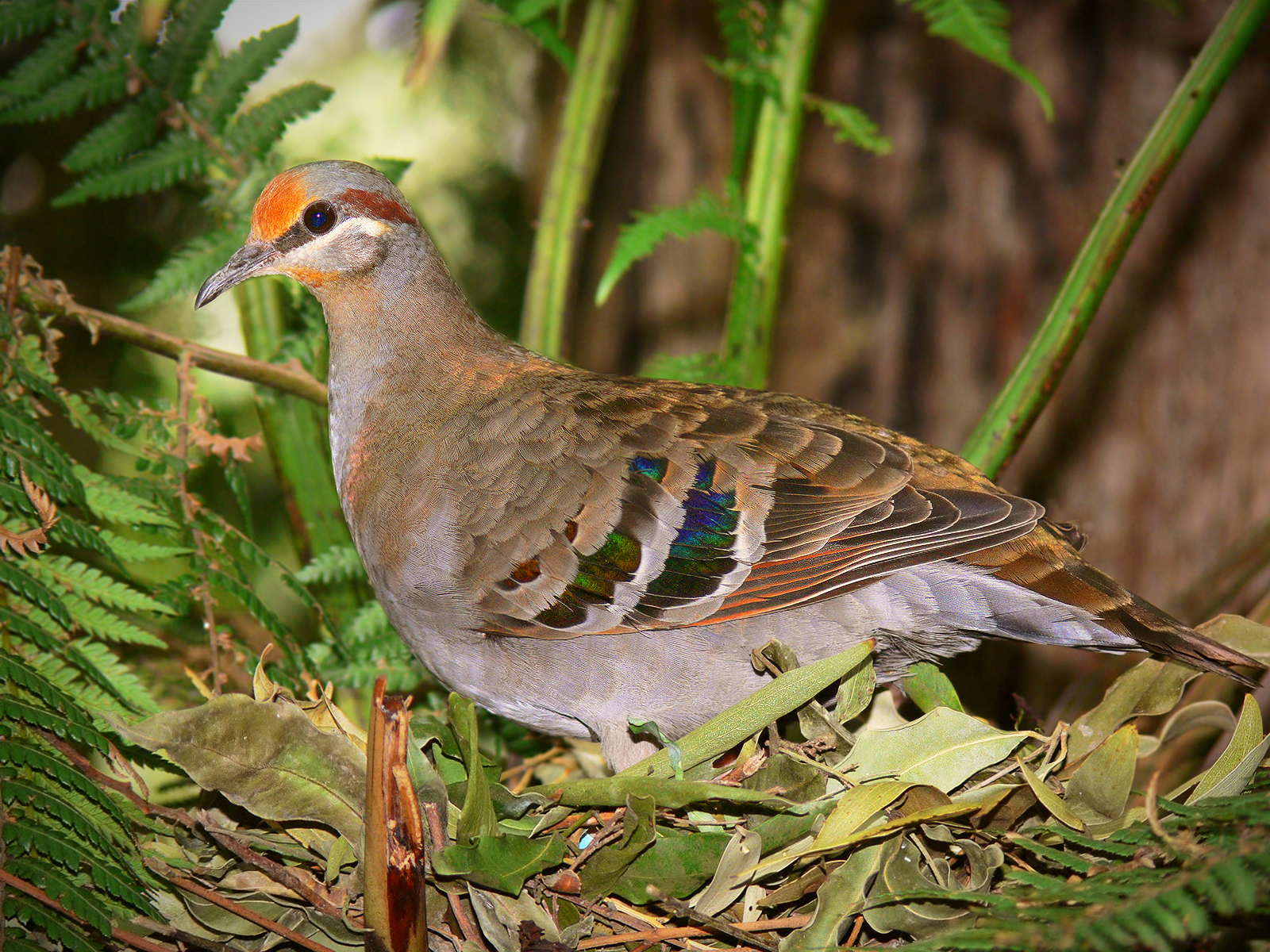
A brush bronzewing Phaps elegans, standing upon its semi-completed nest

The bronzewing pigeons are a group of pigeons native to Australia which have distinctive iridescent wing patches that appear bronze or green-brown in dull light, but flash in many bright colours in the sun as the bird moves. Three species are always known as "bronzewings" in the genus Phaps, and several broadly similar birds also have the trademark wing patch to a more or less obvious degree. Bronzewings are ground feeders, but are capable of very fast flight. They tend to browse quietly until disturbed, then remain still, their earthy browns blending into the earth and leaf litter until the intruder approaches too closely, when the bronzewings take off with an explosive burst of sudden wing clapping and feather noise, and disappear from sight within moments.

The dividing line between the bronzewings and the rock pigeons is arbitrary; essentially, rock pigeons are bronzewings without bronze on their wings. Members of the group include:

- The common bronzewing (Phaps chalcoptera) is a large, bulky pigeon with a small head, found in all parts of Australia bar some of the deep desert, Cape York Peninsula, and urban areas. Its advertising call is an extraordinary mournful whooo repeated at metronomic intervals for an interminable length of time. Although rather wary by nature, birds in the urban fringes become quite used to humans.
- The brush bronzewing (P. elegans) is uncommon, probably threatened. It is marginally smaller than the common bronzewing and rather secretive, except for its call, which is slightly faster and higher-pitched, but maintained through the hottest days with equally monotonous determination. Brush bronzewings nest low down, often on the ground, so are vulnerable to feral cats and foxes.
- Flock bronzewings (P. histrionica) roams the grasslands of the northern half of the continent. Once found in enormous flocks, they are still to be seen in their thousands. Pizzey's description of their habits is memorable: "When locally abundant, at end of day, undulating, shearwater-like flocks fly to water, settle short distance away, and walk in. Thirsty latecomers may drop directly into water and drink while spreadeagled, before springing off."
- Crested pigeons (Ocyphaps lophotes) are distinctive, common, and widespread. Usually seen in small flocks in open woodlands or grasslands, they are always close to water. With the clearing of much forest and the provision of water in arid regions for cattle, crested pigeons have increased in number.
- The spinifex pigeon (Geophaps plumifera) is an unmistakable ground-dwelling small pigeon, reddish-bronze in colour and prominently crested, with a unique upright, military stance. When disturbed, it prefers to run erratically, breaking into rapid, noisy flight only if pressed. A desert specialist, it is found in the arid and semiarid zones of the northern half of the continent.
- The partridge pigeon (G. smithii) is a dull brown bird about 26 cm long found only in pairs or small flocks in the grasslands of northern Northern Territory and northern Western Australia.
- The squatter pigeon (G. scripta), like the very similar partridge pigeon, feeds, roosts, and nests on the ground, and prefers infertile sandy soils and gravel where the grass grows only thinly, allowing easy movement. Squatter pigeons are restricted to the eastern half of Queensland and north-eastern New South Wales.
