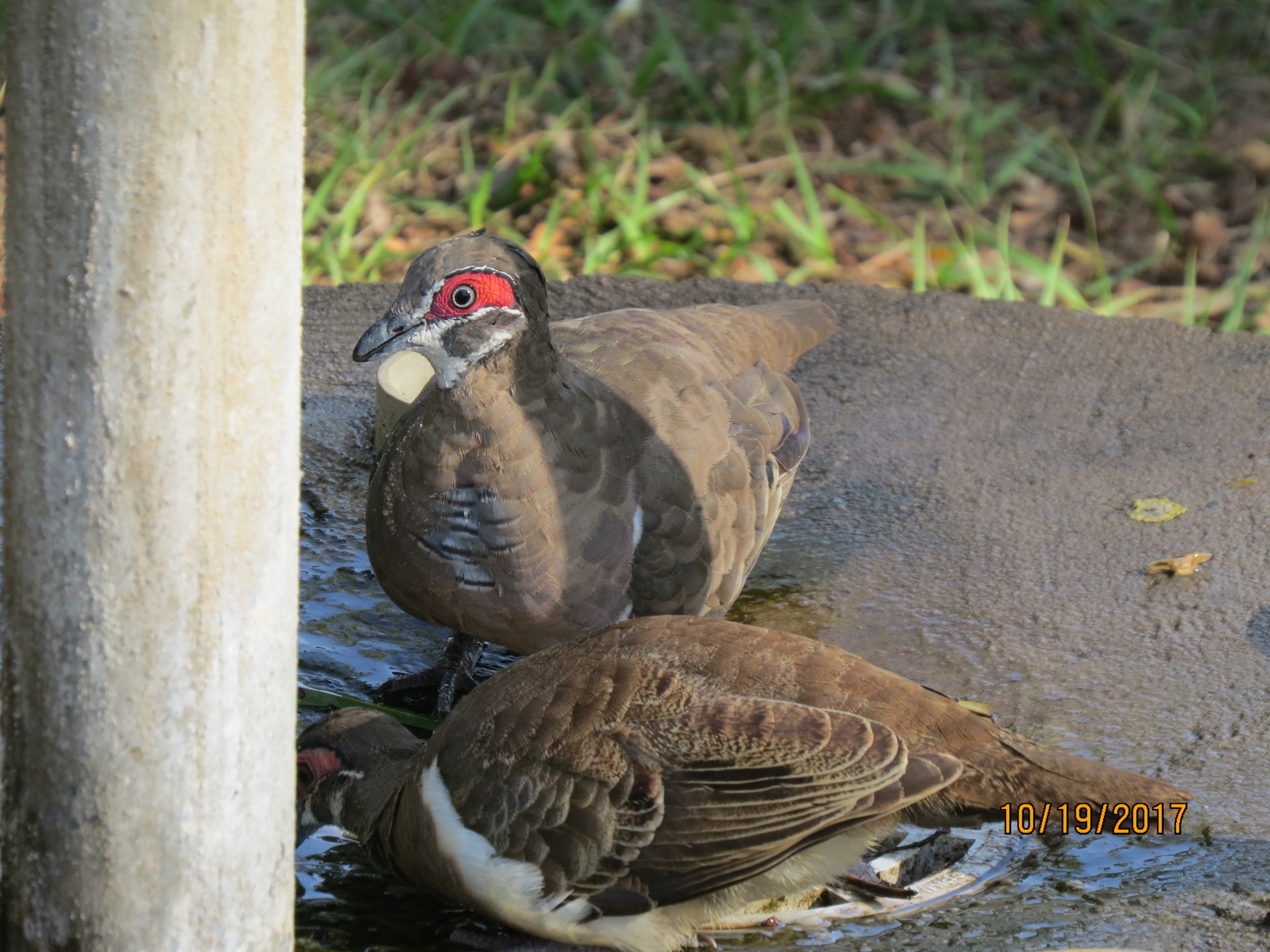

Conservation status
- Least Concern (IUCN 3.1)

Scientific classification
- Kingdom: Animalia
- Phylum: Chordata
- Class: Aves
- Order: Columbiformes
- Family: Columbidae
- Genus: Geophaps
- Species: G. smithii

Binomial name
- Geophaps smithii (Jardine & Selby, 1830)
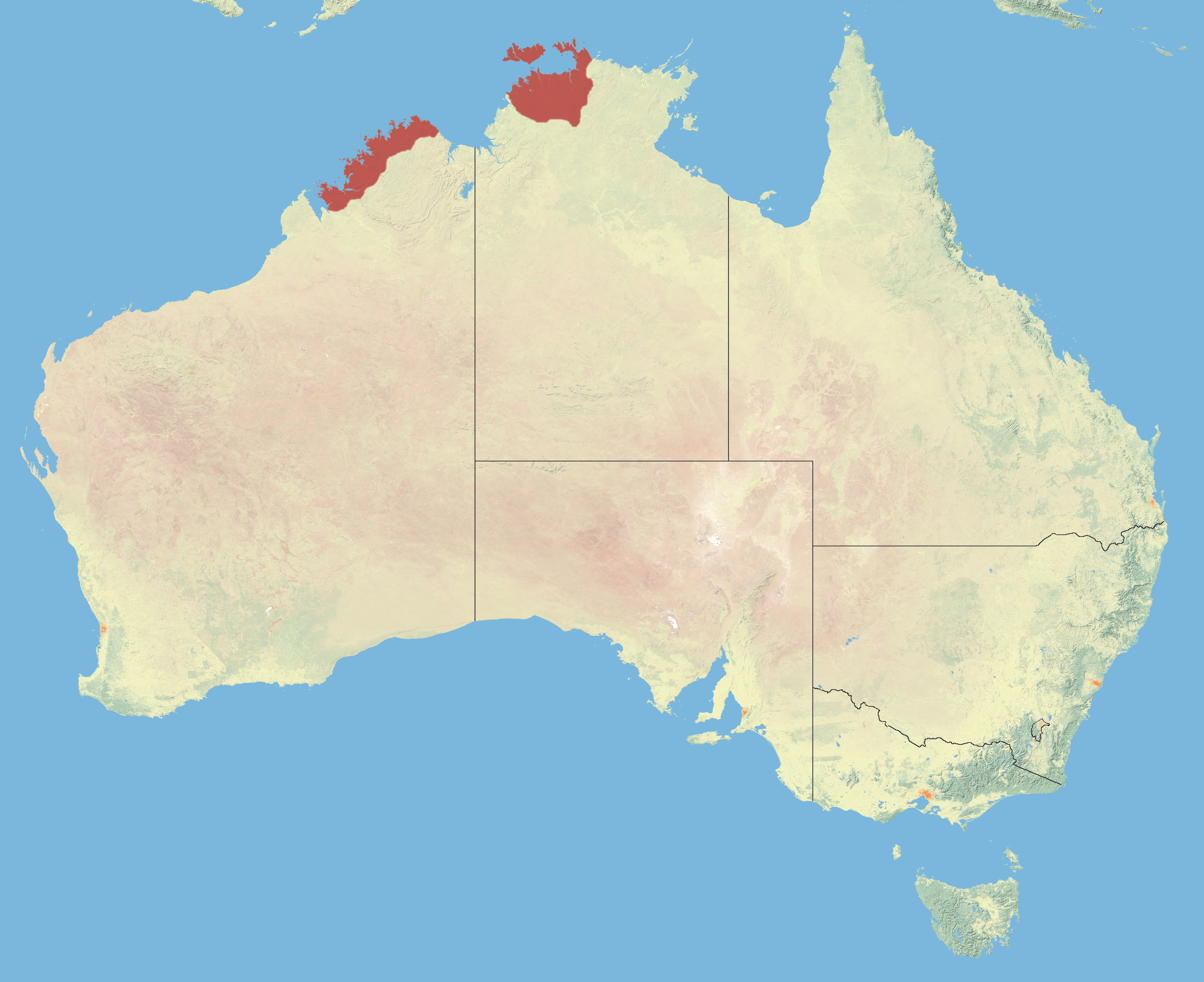
- approximate range

= Partridge pigeon =

Species of bird

The partridge pigeon (Geophaps smithii) is a species of bird in the family Columbidae. It is endemic to Australia.

Its natural habitats are subtropical or tropical dry shrubland and subtropical or tropical dry lowland grassland. It is threatened by habitat loss.

== Taxonomy and systematics ==
The partridge pigeon is one of three species in the genus Geophaps. Within the genus, the partridge pigeon is most closely related to the squatter pigeon, with these two species forming a clade that is sister to the spinifex pigeon. These three are most closely related to the crested pigeon.

Alternative names for the partridge pigeon include bare-eyed bronzewing, bare-eyed partridge bronzewing, and bare-eyed partridge pigeon.

=== Subspecies ===
There are two subspecies, differing mainly in the colour of their orbital skin. The two subspecies are also sometimes treated as color morphs instead of races, making the species monotypic.

- G. s. smithii – Jardine and Selby, 1830: The nominate subspecies, it is found in extreme northeastern Western Australia and in north Northern Territory.
- G. s. blauwii – Mathews, 1912: It is found in northern Kimberley, in Western Australia yellow eye contour.
