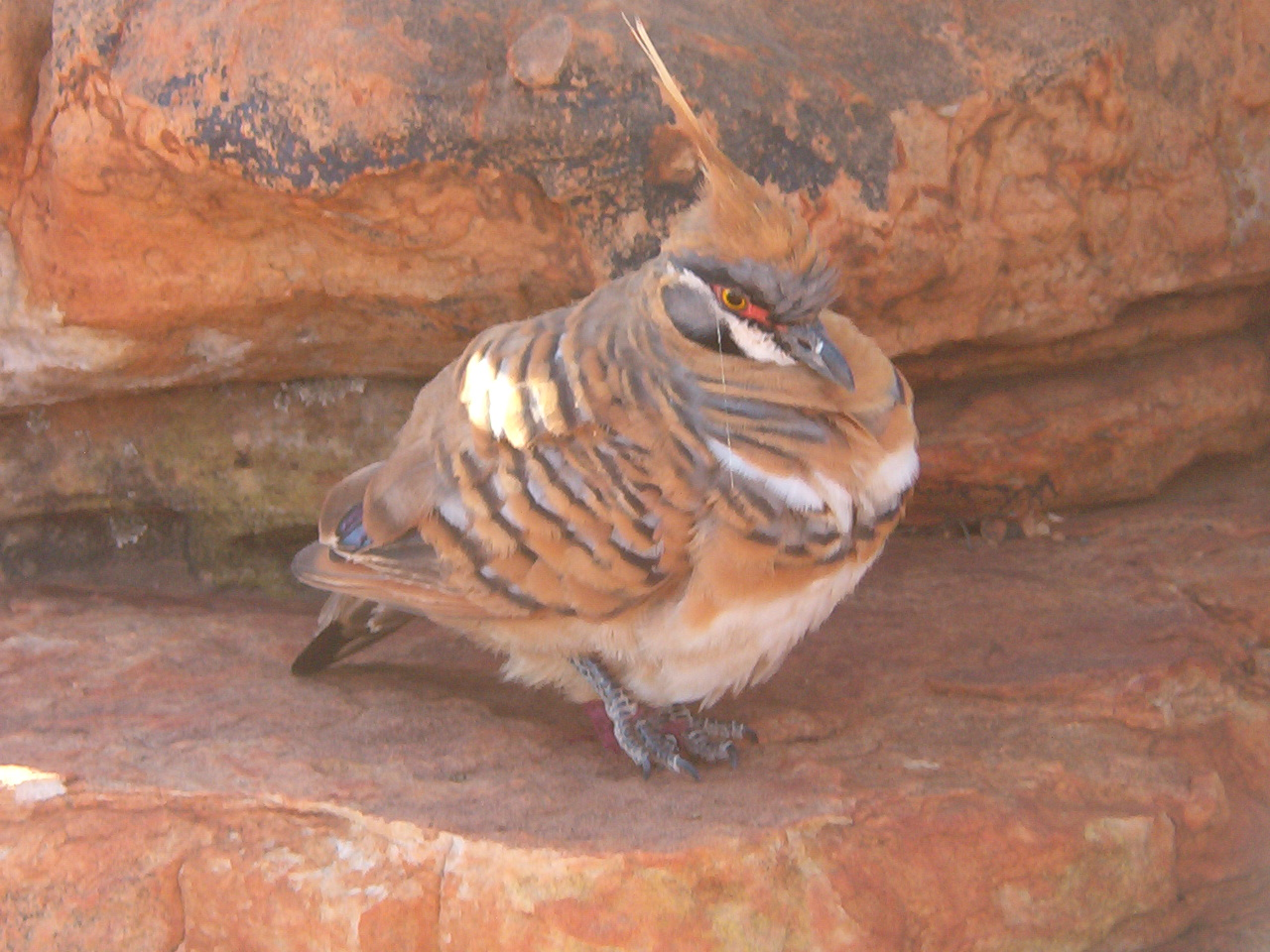
- Spinifex pigeon

Scientific classification
- Kingdom: Animalia
- Phylum: Chordata
- Class: Aves
- Order: Columbiformes
- Family: Columbidae
- Tribe: Phabini
- Genus: Geophaps; G.R. Gray, 1842

Type species
- Columba scripta Temminck, 1821

Species
- live: Geophaps plumifera; Geophaps scripta; Geophaps smithii

= Geophaps =

Genus of birds

Geophaps is a small genus of doves. Established by George Robert Gray, it contains three extant species. The plumage and distribution suggests that all species within the genus have formed from a common ancestor and that through adaptive radiation they have varied greatly in size, shape and ecology.

== Taxonomy ==
The genus Geophaps was introduced in 1842 to accommodate the squatter pigeon (Geophaps scripta) by the English zoologist George Robert Gray. The genus name combines of the Ancient Greek geō (γεω) meaning "ground" and phaps (φάψ), meaning "wild pigeon".

Pigeons and doves are placed in their taxonomic groups based predominantly on structural characteristics. Pigeons feed their young by regurgitation and suck water while their beak is immersed. Males and females divide incubation duties.

Geophaps pigeons are members of the family Columbidae, whose distribution is spread between three defined areas around the globe: the Americas; Africa, the Middle East and Central Asia; and Asia, Australasia and Oceania. Australia and Oceania are home to almost two-thirds of all living species of Columbidae, which also includes three-quarters of all threatened species globally.

The genus contains three species:

- Spinifex pigeon, Geophaps plumifera
- Squatter pigeon, Geophaps scripta
- Partridge pigeon, Geophaps smithii

A fourth species, the crested pigeon is sometimes placed within the genus.

=== Evolution ===
Pigeons in the genus Geophaps are believed to have evolved from bird fossils which were found at Riversleigh, north-west Queensland. The fossils were described as a new genus and species of pigeon and are the oldest Columbia fossils to have been found globally. The fossil species has been most closely linked to the Australian bronzewings, including Geophaps species and suggests that pigeons may have evolved in the southern hemisphere. The fossil find indicates that the ancestry of Australian bronzewings goes back to the end of the Paleogene era.

== Description ==
All species of pigeons and doves are described as having short necks and legs, and a short, slender bill.

The three species within the Geophaps are endemic to Australia and are generally described as bronzewings. They are closely related to pigeons from the genus Phaps. The Geophaps species share partridge-like flight patterns and show no differences in plumage between the sexes. All members of the genus are terrestrial. Geophaps scripta and Geophaps smithii are closely related species and have with recognisable facial patterns. The spinifex pigeon has a long, erect crest and is considered reasonably different from the squatter pigeon and the partridge pigeon. It is sometimes placed in the genus Ocyphaps with the crested pigeon.

Genus Geophaps – G.R. Gray, 1842 – three species
Common name	Scientific name and subspecies	Range	Size and ecology	IUCN status and estimated population
Spinifex pigeon	Geophaps plumifera Gould, 1842 Three subspecies: G.p.plumifera; G.p.leucogaster; G.p.proxima	Dry parts of inland and Western Australia	Size: M: 200–208 mm F: 206–216 mm Habitat: Diet:	LC
Partridge pigeon	Geophaps smithii (Jardine & Selby, 1830)	Kimberleys, N.T, Melville Island	Size: M: 271–279 mm F: 231–251 mm Habitat: Diet:	VU
Squatter pigeon	Geophaps scripta (Temminck, 1821) Two subspecies: G.s.scripta; G.s.peninsulae	Eastern Australia from Cape York to N.E NSW.	Size: M: 262–296 mm F: 256–287 mm Habitat: Diet:	LC

Table 1.1, shows the following information- Common name, scientific name/s, sub-species, size, distribution and IUCN (International Union for Conservation of Nature and Natural Resources) Red List Status

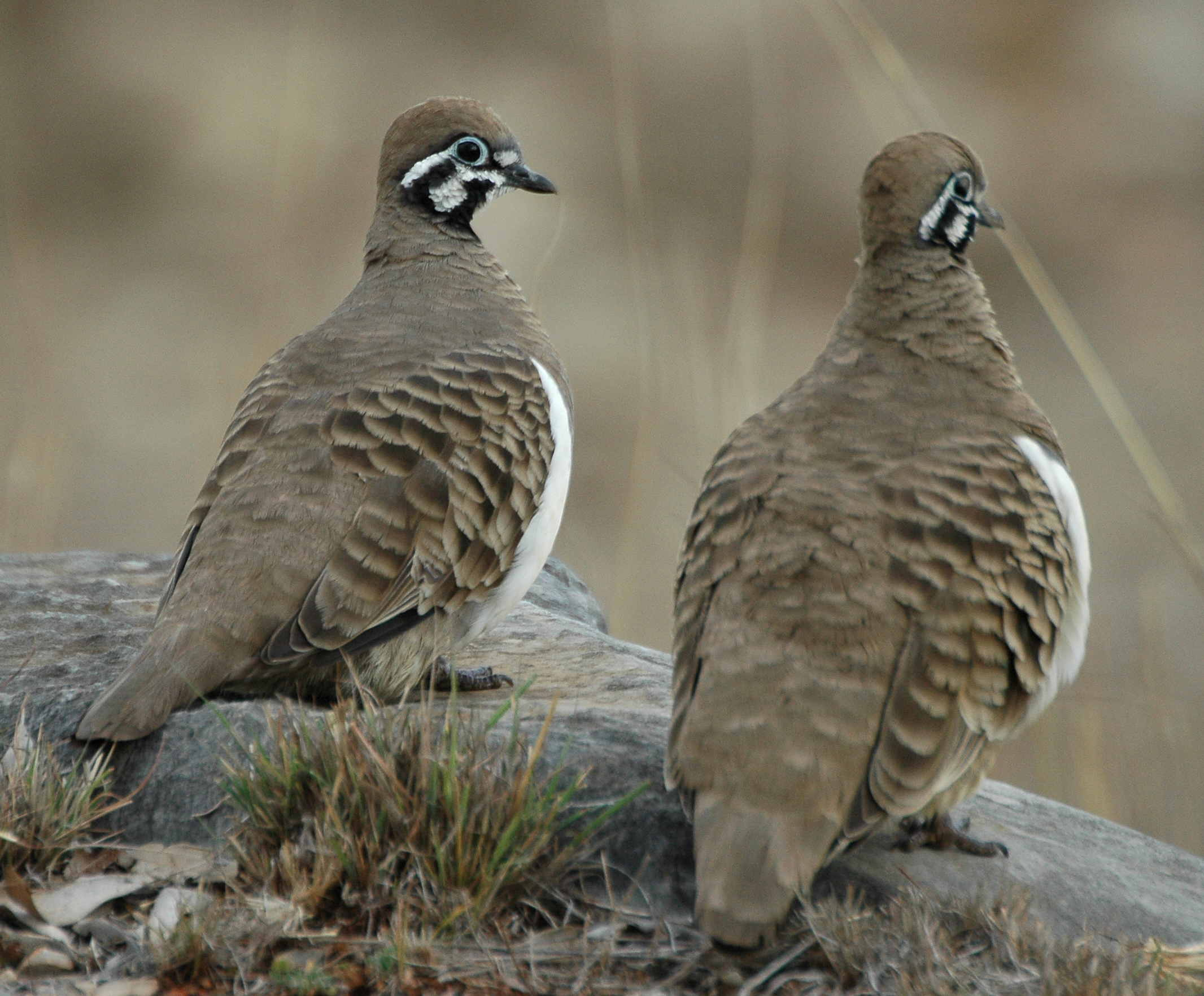
Geophaps scripta, the squatter pigeon

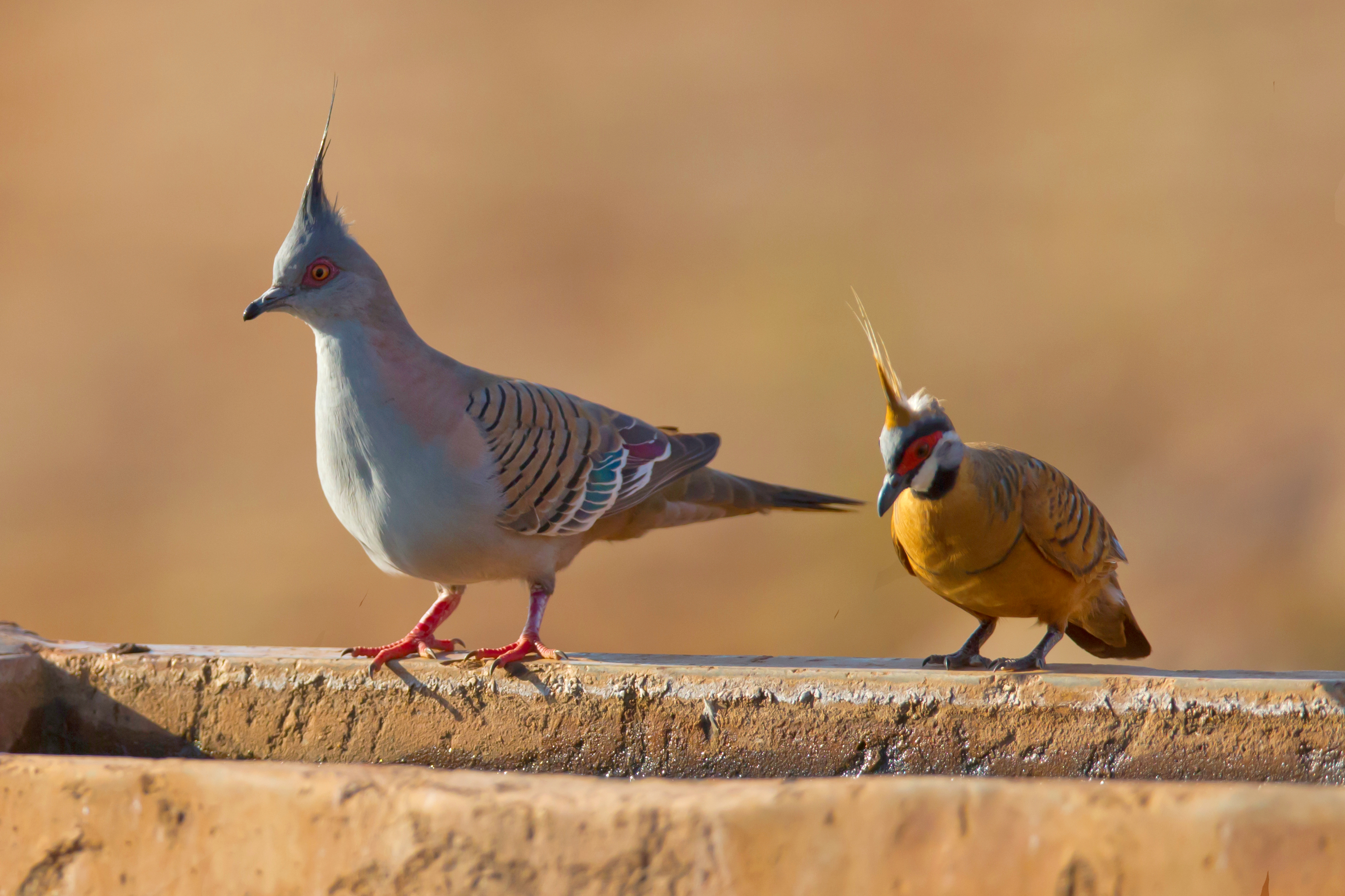
Crested pigeon alongside Spinifex pigeon

== Feeding, behaviour and ecology ==
=== Feeding ===
Geophaps species are ground feeding granivores, with studies finding that seeds make up their diet almost entirely, with a small number of insects found in the crops of Geophaps smithii. While the Spinifex pigeon is found in arid tussock/spinifex grasslands, the spinifex grass seeds have not been found to make up a large portion of their diet.

=== Breeding ===
All Geophaps pigeons exhibit a bowing display during courtship. The Spinifex pigeon and crested pigeon's display is performed with a raising and fanning out of the tail with their folded wings partly opened to display their iridescent wing marks to their potential partner. The other members of the Geophaps displays and bows in a very similar manner.

G. scripta has been recorded to have performed its courtship ritual where it stood fully erect on an exposed branch, with plumage slightly fluffed out. The male then bobs up and down rapidly and rhythmically, he displays alone and waits for a female to fly from cover to pair with him. Rainfall and food abundance has been shown to effect breeding cycles.

Crested pigeons have been observed to build nests on a platform of branches, with both sexes collecting nest building material. The female builds the nest, lacing thin twigs through the substructure. They are thought to learn to build nests through trial and error.

=== Parasites ===
Pigeons and doves are parasitised by two major groups of lice; wing lice and body lice. Most birds are host to both groups, which eat the downy parts of feathers that are close to the body. Body lice have been found to be more likely to be host specific than wing lice, possibly due to their host ecology where terrestrial pigeons feeding on the ground may create an easier transfer of lice and therefore be more likely to carry host specific body lice than arboreal birds.

== Threats to conservation ==
Columbidae species are amongst the most threatened bird families around the world. Geophaps species' conservation is largely threatened by habitat loss and fragmentation caused predominantly by agriculture and human interference as well as by predation by introduced predators, namely cats.

As arid environments are naturally changing, it is difficult to gauge the extent of change caused by pastoralisation, however, grazing by livestock is considered incompatible with natural succession of ecosystems. Overgrazing by livestock causes alteration and degradation of soil and flora. Very few arid species have been recorded as declining in numbers since European settlement and some species, including the Spinifex pigeon and the Crested pigeon have increased in population size, possibly due to the increase in permanent water sources created for livestock.

== Cultural links ==
Species within the Geophaps have been named in Aboriginal stories and songs.

The Partridge pigeon (Geophaps smithii) has been listed as a bird species which features as a Morrdjdjanjno song subject. Morrdjdjanjno is a genre of song from the Arnhem Land plateau in the Northern Territory top end, they are sung only by men and passed down as 'open domain' songs. Morrdjdjanjno songs' subjects are discussed in relation to mythological events of religious significance and are believed to bring the singer into contact with the animal being sung about or to increase numbers of certain species.

The Spinifex pigeon and crested pigeons have been recorded in versions of an Aboriginal children's story from Central Australia, conveying rich symbolic meanings between the Geophaps species and associations by the Arandic people with 'kurdaitchas' (a person who sets out to kill or harm someone, often in revenge, and who leaves no trace.
