= Euphorbia tannensis subsp. tannensis =

Scientific classification
- Kingdom: Plantae
- Clade: Tracheophytes
- Clade: Angiosperms
- Clade: Eudicots
- Clade: Rosids
- Order: Malpighiales
- Family: Euphorbiaceae
- Genus: Euphorbia
- Species: E. tannensis Spreng.
- Subspecies: E. t. subsp. tannensis

Trinomial name
- Euphorbia tannensis subsp. tannensis

Subspecies of flowering plant

Euphorbia tannensis subsp. tannensis is a species of herb or shrub native to Australia and some Pacific islands.

== Description ==
It grows as a compact shrub up to 60 centimetres in height. It can be distinguished from the other subspecies of Euphorbia tannensis, E. tannensis subsp. eremophila, by its broader leaves; these are no more than 6.5 times as long as broad, whereas that are more than 8 times as long as broad in subsp. eremophila.

== Taxonomy ==
As the autonym for the species, it is based upon the original publication of the species by Curt Polycarp Joachim Sprengel in 1809, but did not come into existence until the publication of E. tannensis subsp. eremophila in 1977.

== Distribution and habitat ==
This subspecies occurs in Australia and some Pacific islands. In Australia it is restricted to the northern and eastern coasts.
