= Euphorbia tannensis var. finlaysonii =

Scientific classification
- Kingdom: Plantae
- Clade: Tracheophytes
- Clade: Angiosperms
- Clade: Eudicots
- Clade: Rosids
- Order: Malpighiales
- Family: Euphorbiaceae
- Genus: Euphorbia
- Species: E. tannensis
- Subspecies: E. t. subsp. eremophila
- Variety: E. t. var. finlaysonii

Trinomial name
- Euphorbia tannensis var. finlaysonii (J.M.Black) D.C.Hassall

Variety of plants

Euphorbia tannensis var. finlaysonii is a variety of desert herb native to Australia.

== Description ==
It grows as an erect shrub, usually up to a metre in height, but sometimes up to 1.5 metres, with green or yellow flowers. From a distance it may appear leafless. It is distinguished from the other variety of E. tannensis subsp. eremophila, E. tannensis var. eremophila, by its lobed involucral glands.

== Taxonomy ==
This taxon was first published by John McConnell Black in 1935, at species rank as Euphorbia finlaysonii. In 1977 David Hassall demoted it to a variety of E. tannensis. At the same time he did the same thing for E. eremophila, and since he felt these two to be more closely related to each other than either is to the type material of E. tannensis, he erected E. tannensis subsp. eremophila to hold both varieties.

== Distribution and habitat ==
This variety has a much more restricted distribution than the other infraspecific taxa of E. tannensis; it occurs only in a narrow strip of desert in South Australia and the Northern Territory.
