= Euphorbia tannensis var. eremophila =

Scientific classification
- Kingdom: Plantae
- Clade: Tracheophytes
- Clade: Angiosperms
- Clade: Eudicots
- Clade: Rosids
- Order: Malpighiales
- Family: Euphorbiaceae
- Genus: Euphorbia
- Species: E. tannensis
- Subspecies: E. t. subsp. eremophila
- Variety: E. t. var. eremophila

Trinomial name
- Euphorbia tannensis var. eremophila (A.Cunn.) D.C.Hassall

Variety of plants

Euphorbia tannensis var. eremophila is the more widespread variety of E. tannensis subsp. eremophila (desert spurge).

== Description ==
It grows as an erect shrub, usually up to a metre in height, but sometimes up to 1.5 metres, with green or yellow flowers. From a distance it may appear leafless. It is distinguished from the other variety, E. tannensis var. finlaysonii, by its ovate involucral glands.

== Taxonomy ==
This taxon was first published by Allan Cunningham in 1848, at species rank as Euphorbia eremophila. In 1977 David Hassall demoted it to a variety of E. tannensis. At the same time he did the same thing for E. finlaysonii, and since he felt these two to be more closely related to each other than either is to the type material of E. tannensis, he erected E. tannensis subsp. eremophila to hold both varieties.

== Distribution and habitat ==
This variety is widespread on the Australian mainland, occurring in every mainland state, though only in the far north-west corner of Victoria.
