= Euphorbia tannensis =

Scientific classification
- Kingdom: Plantae
- Clade: Tracheophytes
- Clade: Angiosperms
- Clade: Eudicots
- Clade: Rosids
- Order: Malpighiales
- Family: Euphorbiaceae
- Genus: Euphorbia
- Species: E. tannensis

Binomial name
- Euphorbia tannensis Spreng.

Subspecies
- E. tannensis subsp. tannensis E. tannensis subsp. eremophila

Species of flowering plant

Euphorbia tannensis is a species of herb or shrub native to Australia and some Pacific islands.

== Description ==
It grows as an erect annual or perennial herb or shrub, from 10 centimetres to a metre in height, with green or yellow flowers. It often appears spindly due to its leaves being deciduous.

== Taxonomy ==
This species was first published by Curt Polycarp Joachim Sprengel in 1809, based on a specimen collected by Georg Forster in . In 1977 two species, E. eremophila and E. finlaysonii, were submerged within E. tannensis as E. tannensis var. eremophila and E. tannensis var. finlaysonii respectively, these being treated as varieties of a new subspecies, E. tannensis subsp. eremophila.

== Distribution and habitat ==
This species is widespread on the Australian mainland, occurring in every mainland state, though only in the far north-west corner of Victoria (Australia). It is widely reported as occurring only in Australia; yet the type specimen was collected on Tanna in what is now Vanuatu, and it has also been recorded in New Caledonia.
