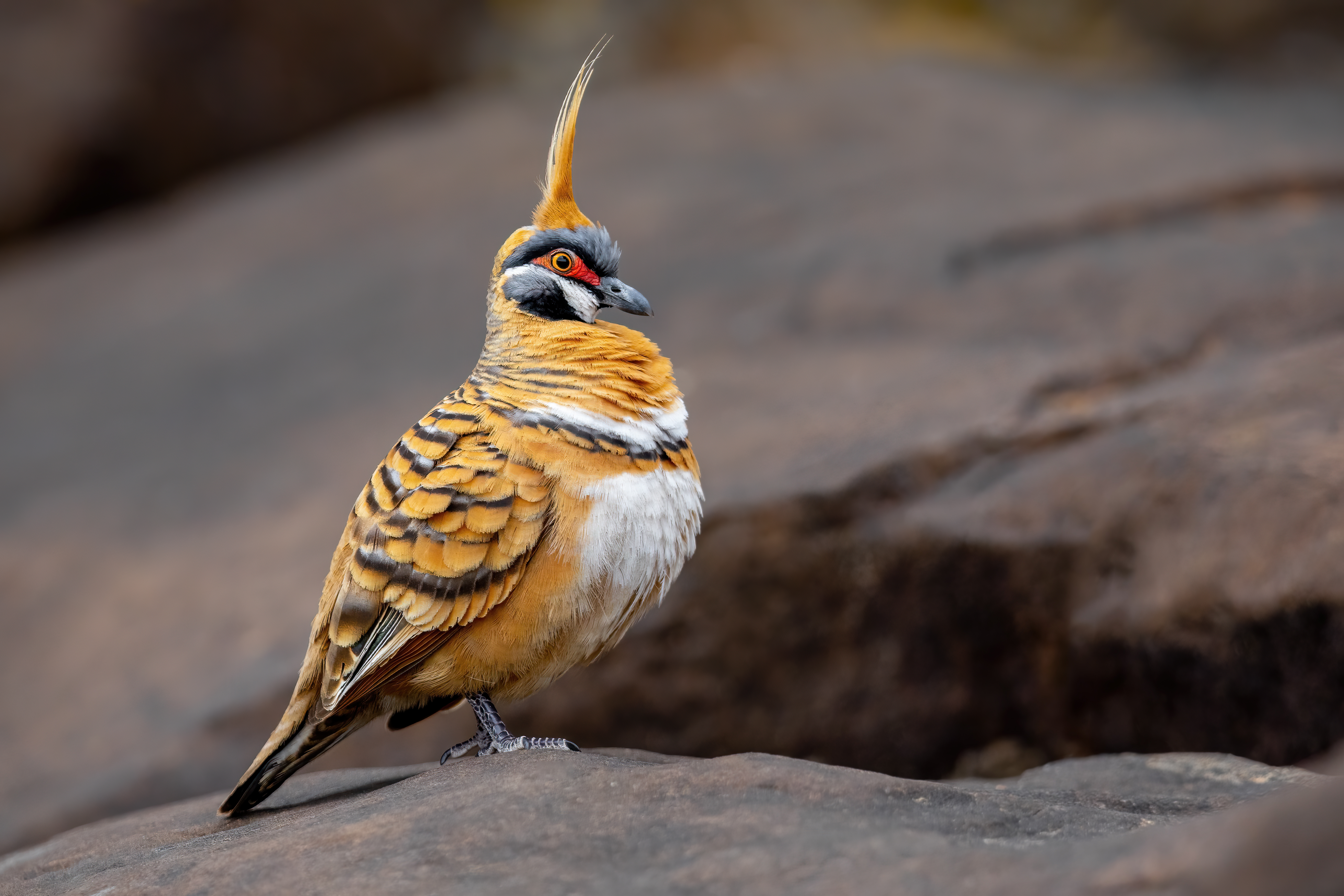

Conservation status
- Least Concern (IUCN 3.1)

Scientific classification
- Kingdom: Animalia
- Phylum: Chordata
- Class: Aves
- Order: Columbiformes
- Family: Columbidae
- Genus: Geophaps
- Species: G. plumifera

Binomial name
- Geophaps plumifera Gould, 1842

= Spinifex pigeon =

Spinifex Pigeon

Species of bird

The Spinifex pigeon (Geophaps plumifera), also known as the plumed-pigeon, desert dove or gannaway pigeon, is one of three endemic Australian bird species within the genus Geophaps. It occurs within a broader group known as bronzewing pigeons. This species is listed under the International Union for Conservation of Nature (IUCN) Red List category of "least concern". It most frequently occurs in arid and semi-arid habitats containing hummock-forming grasses of the genera Triodia and Plectrachne.

== Taxonomy ==
John Gould described the Spinifex pigeon in 1842 and there have been several revisions at both the species and subspecies level. The current taxonomy was determined through a comprehensive examination of twelve variables in 712 specimens from 54 localities. Three subspecies are recognised:

1. Eastern spinifex pigeon (central eastern white-bellied subspecies) Geophaps plumifera leucogaster
2. North-western spinifex pigeon (north-western white-bellied subspecies) Geophaps plumifera plumifera
3. Pilbara spinifex pigeon (brown bellied western subspecies) Geophaps plumifera ferruginea

Geophaps p. subsp. plumifera, is found in the arid areas of north-western and northern Australia, Geophaps plumifera subsp. leucogaster inhabits central Australia and north-western Queensland, and Geophaps plumifera subsp. ferruginea, is found in the Pilbara, Western Australia.

The divergence of the subspecies recognised has been linked to isolation caused by aridity from climatic oscillations during the Pleistocene. It is thought that G. p. plumifera was originally present in the interior of Australia and much of north and central Australia in a less arid period. Subsequent aridity is thought to have resulted in the isolation of a western group, now recognised as G. p. ferruginea, followed by a later split of a northern group, currently recognised as G. p. leucogaster. The later split thought to have resulted in less divergence.

Subsequent oscillations in climate are thought to have resulted in a degree of hybridisation between the groups with a subsequent split leading to the presence of brown-bellied birds in the western Kimberly and residual genes of brown-bellied birds in the western portion of the central-eastern white-bellied group.

== Description ==
The Spinifex pigeon is a small and compact pigeon, which weighs 80–110 g (2.8–3.9 oz), has a mean body length of 200–235 mm (7.9–9.3 in), and has a wingspan of 300–350 mm (12–14 in). Males are slightly larger than females, and generally difficult to visually differentiate.

The plumage is distinctively rufous-brown with thin black bars on the wings and back. The forehead, sides of crown and ear coverts are grey and the bill is black. The facial markings are bold and distinctive, a bright red facial mask is bordered by a black supercilium and moustachial stripe. A white band extends from the chin to behind the eye and the throat is black. A white stripe is present on the breast, and the legs and feet are grey. There is no seasonal variation in plumage.

There is substantial geographical variation in the color of the plumage on the belly, which is reflected in the separation of the western brown-bellied birds from the other subspecies recognised.

== Distribution and habitat ==
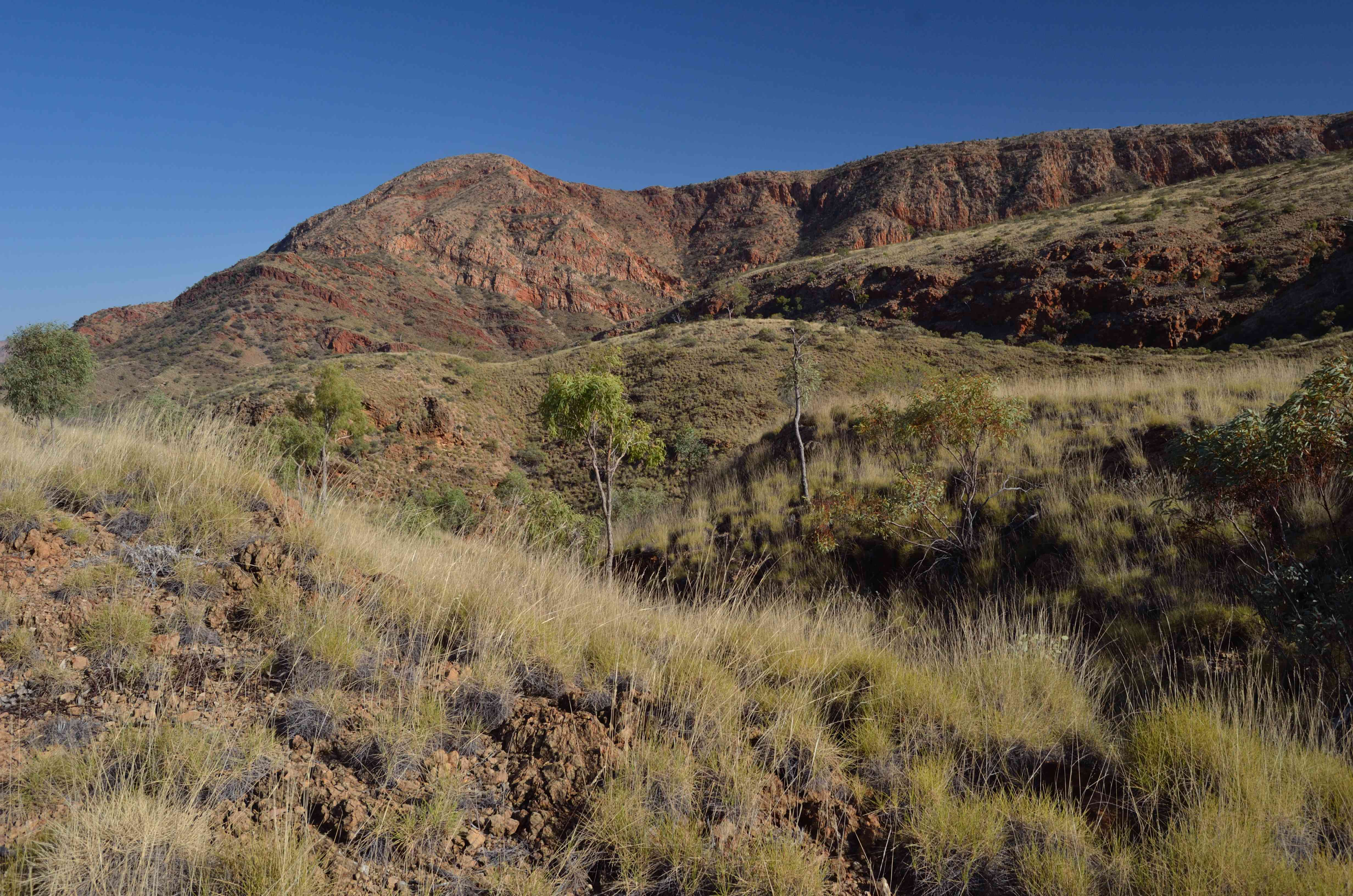
Spinifex pigeon habitat Ormiston Gorge, Northern Territory

The spinifex pigeon occurs throughout much of arid and semi-arid northern and central Australia. It lives in arid and semi-arid stony habitats on rocky hills and mountainous terrain, gorges, dry rocky creek beds and nearby gibber plains. It occupies environments which often experience extreme heat during the day, extreme cold during the night, high seasonal fluctuations in rainfall, and extended periods of severe drought. This species is most often encountered in habitats containing hummock forming grasses of the Triodia and Plectrachne genera, which are colloquially referred to as 'spinifex grasses'. These grasses may form extensive areas of grassland in comprise the understorey component of low open savannah and woodlands of Desert Oak (Allocasuarina decaisneana), Eucalypts and Mulga (Acacia aneura). Although strong associations with spinifex are reported, in some areas it is rarely sighted in spinifex and prefers other types of sparse grassland.

Presence around urbanised areas is rare, however does occur in natural habitats occupied by humans and is reported to have foraged on food provided to domestic fowl on at least one occasion.

Spinifex pigeons do not travel long distances to water, requiring permanent water in close proximity to foraging areas. Both natural and man-made water sources are exploited including waterholes and watercourses and stock drinking troughs.

== Behaviour ==
This species is considered gregarious and sedentary, restricted to habitats within a few kilometres of permanent supply of surface water. They are most often found in pairs or small groups of between four and twenty birds, however, on a rare occasion, have been recorded in a large flock conservatively estimated to number four hundred birds.

They are more frequently observed congregating around water sources in small groups for drinking prior to and during the hottest parts of the day around mid-morning and noon.

Congregations of larger groups occur during favourable seasonal conditions, with dispersal during less favourable conditions or when numbers build up in good seasons. Flocks appear to have regular home ranges, travelling to and from foraging and watering points as a group. It is thought that individuals may move between flocks, however the frequency of this is unknown.

On occasion, this species engages in a spectacular bowing display, where the tail is spread erect like fan, the folded wings are raised and the pupils contract. The shining patches of the secondary feathers flash into view at the same time that the black outer tail feathers become visible. The display is not always directed at other individuals and may be simply self-assertive.

This species also has a head-shaking display that appears as a greeting between pairs and in threat to other individuals. The bird assumes a crouched over position with head lowered and crest flattened and thrusts forward shaking the bill and head.

=== Breeding ===
Breeding occurs throughout the year with highest levels during spring and summer, coinciding with peak rainfall periods and increased supply of food.

Copulation is performed on the ground. The nest is scratched out in a grass-lined depression on stony ground and may be located within sight of other nesting pairs. Two cream colored eggs are laid and incubated by the female for 16 to 18 days by both the male and female. Observations of captive birds indicate that the young are independent at four to six weeks. Average lifespan for wild birds is not reported in the literature.

Large populations can form, however birds disperse and numbers decline following extended periods of extreme drought. After rain, when food supplies increase, there is often a slow recovery in numbers due to local breeding.

=== Food and foraging ===
Spinifex pigeons are unique among many other desert birds in that they are sedentary arid spinifex habitat specialists. They are capable of enduring extreme conditions and the availability of drought-resistant seed plants varies greatly with seasonal conditions, often declining substantially during periods of extended drought.

They forage on the ground singly, in pairs or small flocks for seeds, vegetable matter and insects, mostly in bare areas between clumps of grasses and occasionally in dry rocky watercourses or dry margins of wetlands.

The diet is almost entirely made up of the seeds of drought-resistant grasses and herbs, with spinifex perhaps surprisingly not an important food source overall (Frith and Barker). Animals and vegetative material contribute to the diet in trace amounts. Spinifex pigeons will also take some foods given by humans, particularly around camping areas.

Foraging mostly occurs early in the morning and late in the afternoon during cooler periods of the day in close proximity to water sources.

=== Avoidance of predators ===
Spinifex pigeons are weak long distance fliers being more suited to vertical and short horizontal movements, which aid in escape from predators in preferred habitats such as steep hills and gorges. Approached birds are generally bold and may remain still until approached at very close distances. They are a predominantly terrestrial species and rely on running movements and the camouflage provided by their rufous plumage against the desert sand and rocks to escape predators, rather than evasion by flight, and will frequently run away when approached rather than take to the wing.

At the nest adults have been recorded to respond defensively in captivity and have been recorded to abandon the eggs or hatchlings as a decoy to predators in the wild.

=== Voice ===
The spinifex pigeon has a complex repertoire of calls including advertising calls, a display call, contact calls, alarm calls and threat calls (Hanzab). In general calls range from a soft high-pitched coo or cooloo-coo to a deep coo-r-r-r.

=== Adaptations to desert environments ===
Spinifex pigeon inhabit harsh desert environments and must be able to cope with substantial water and heat stress. Their geographic range includes one of the hottest places on earth, Marble Bar, Western Australia, where air temperatures exceed 37.8 °C up to 160 days of the year.

Hydration is achieved by drinking and metabolic water production, as water intake from food sources is low and maintenance of positive water balance is crucial due to the importance of evaporative cooling for thermoregulation at high ambient temperatures. Accordingly, spinifex pigeons generally occur in close proximity to permanent water sources.

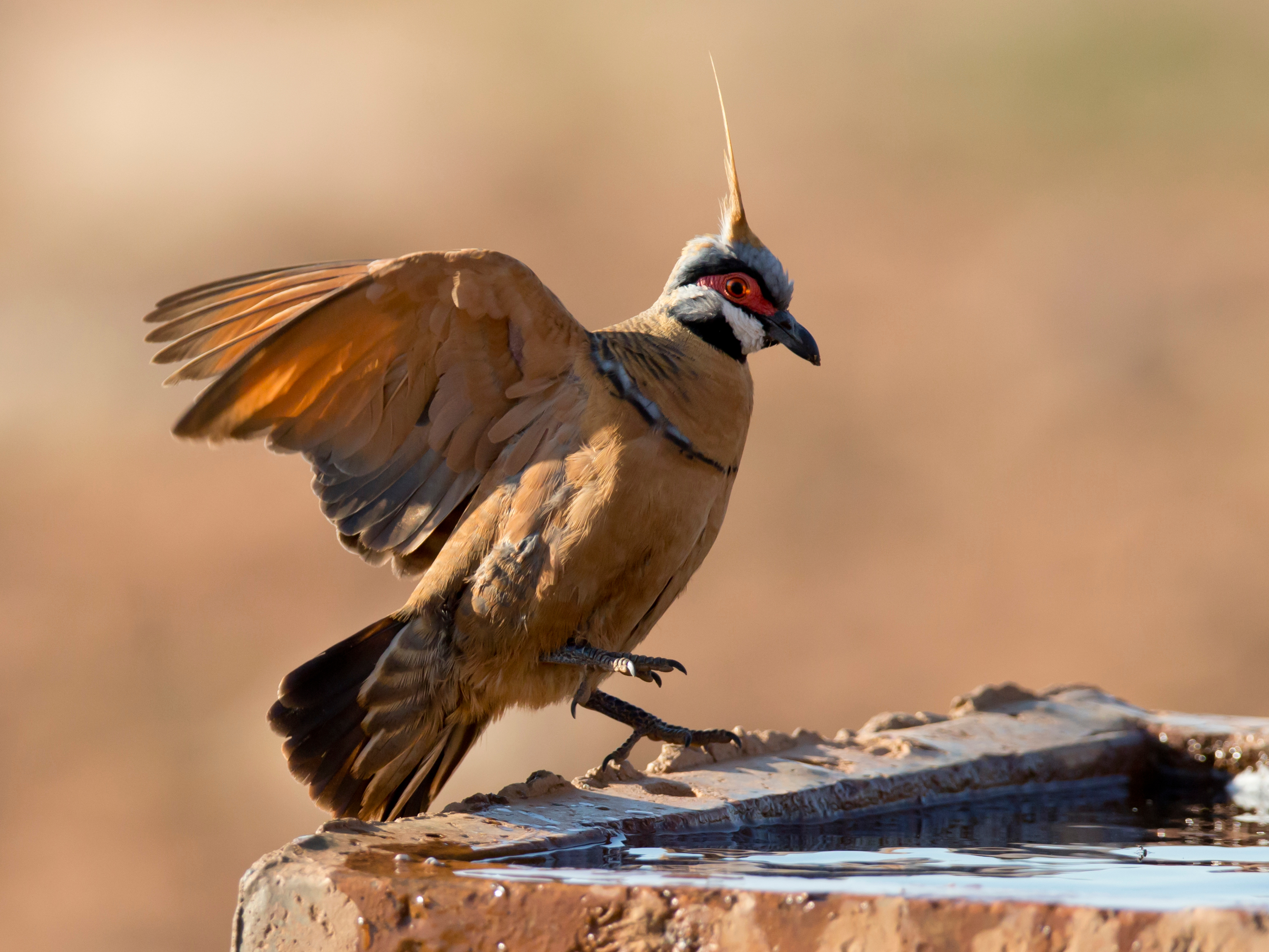
Spinifex pigeon coming in to drink from a stock watering point

The ability of the spinifex pigeon to withstand high ambient temperatures is a combination of low body heat production, the ability to increase non-evaporative heat loss by hyperthermia and elevated dry thermal conductance, and a relatively high evaporative water loss.

== Threats and conservation ==
There are early reports from settlers that the replacement of horse studs with sheep grazing initially resulted in a reduction in the extent of suitable habitats for this species. Other authors suggest, however, that the range of this species is likely to have expanded since European settlement in Australia, due to the installation of permanent stock watering points in areas previously without surface water.

Current threats are more likely to include overgrazing by stock and feral animals, inappropriate fire regimes and increased ambient temperatures and reduction in water availability due to climate change.

Currently the species is listed on the IUCN Red List as a species of least concern and its habitats are protected in several national parks throughout its range including the Tjoritja/West MacDonnell National Park, Watarrka National Park, Purnululu National Park, Kakadu National Park and Diamantina Lakes National Park.

== Similar species ==
The crested pigeon is the only other Australian pigeon species with an erect crest. However, the spinifex pigeon can be easily distinguished by its smaller size, rusty coloured plumage, distinctive facial markings and occurrence in desert habitats.
