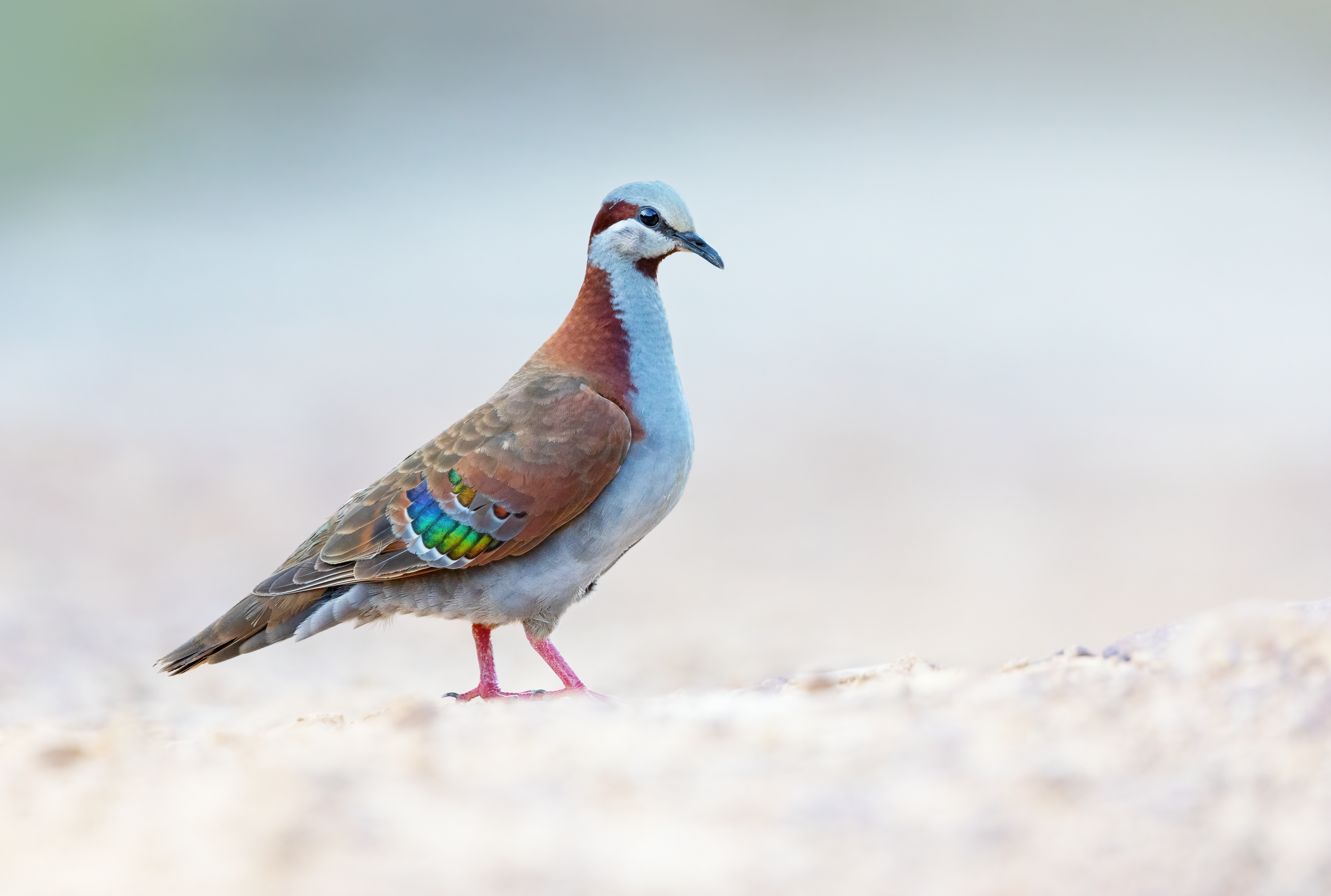

Conservation status
- Least Concern (IUCN 3.1)

Scientific classification
- Kingdom: Animalia
- Phylum: Chordata
- Class: Aves
- Order: Columbiformes
- Family: Columbidae
- Genus: Phaps
- Species: P. elegans

Binomial name
- Phaps elegans (Temminck, 1809)
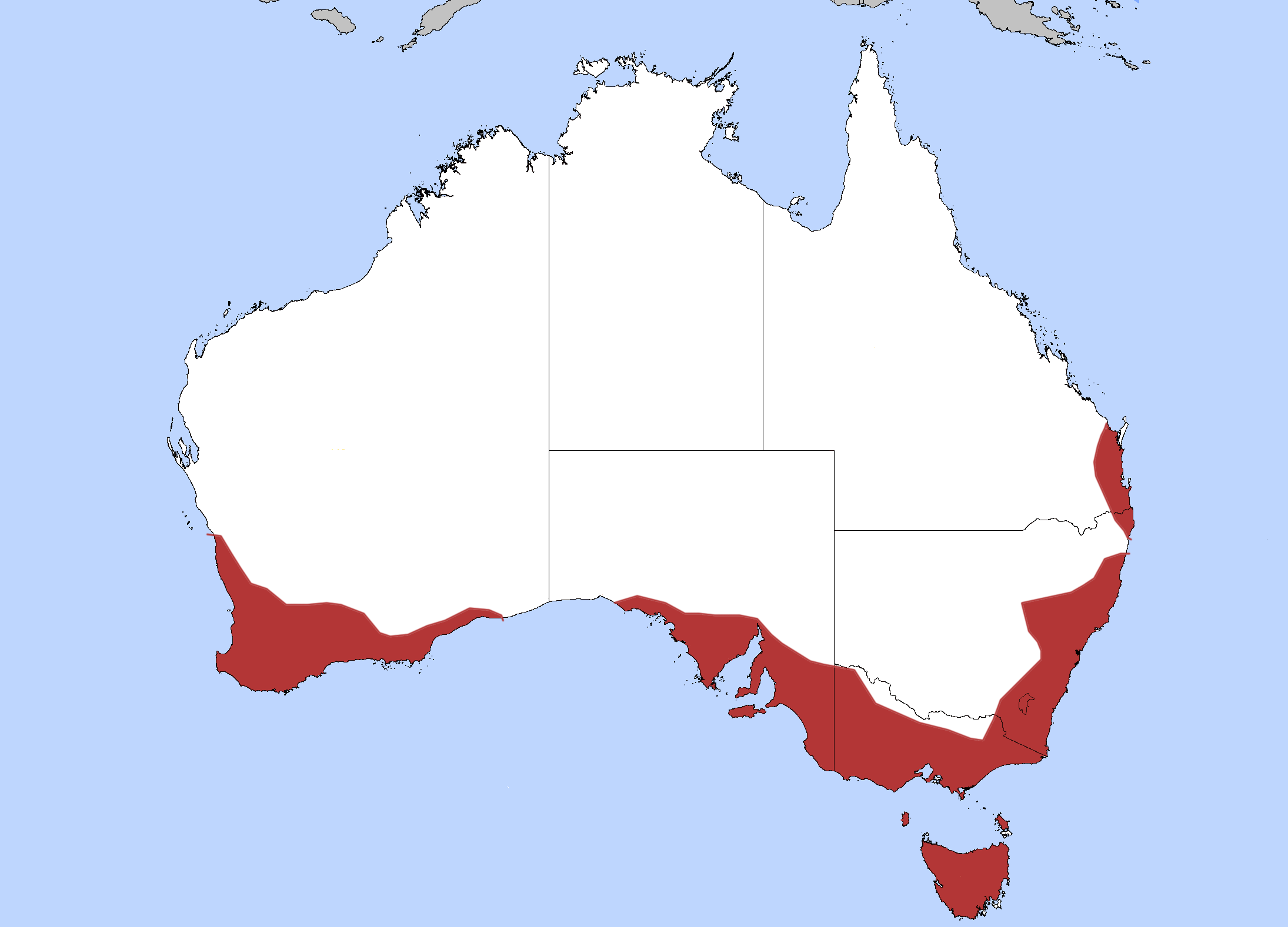
- range

= Brush bronzewing =

Species of bird

The brush bronzewing (Phaps elegans) is a species of bird in the pigeon family, Columbidae. It is endemic to Australia, with two biogeographically distinct subspecies.

== Taxonomy ==
The brush bronzewing is one of around 310 species in the family Columbidae and can be classified into two distinct subspecies, P. elegans elegans and P. elegans occidentalis. P. elegans was first described by C. J. Temminck in 1809.

== Description ==
The brush bronzewing is similar in size and shape to the closely related common bronzewing (Phaps chalcoptera), however it's shorter and stockier in appearance.

These birds are relatively small and range in size from 25 to 33 cm. Sexual dimorphism is apparent in these birds. Both sexes are dark-olive brown on top, rich chestnut in colour along the nape and shoulder with blue-grey underparts. The brush bronzewing is named for the iridescent bars of blue and green across the inner secondary feather of each wing.

== Distribution and habitat ==
The brush bronzewing is endemic to Australia, found in the South-West and South-East of the mainland with populations in Queensland, New South Wales, Victoria, South Australia, Western Australia and also Tasmania. The subspecies P. elegans occidentalis occurs as a geographically distinct population, in the southwest of WA.

This species favours dense coastal heathland, wet or dry sclerophyll forests, woodlands and some mallee areas. Habitats with dense shrub layers and foliage, including native species such as Banksia, Acacia, Melaleuca or Leptospermum, allow these cautious birds to find cover.

== Behaviour ==
=== Feeding ===
This bird feeds on seeds, berries and small insects; foraging primarily on the ground Like most granivores, the brush bronzewing will swallow small pieces of grit and pebble to aid the grinding of seeds within the gizzard. Local movements are likely a response to food and habitat availability. Unlike the common bronzewing, feeding doesn't occur in small flocks, usually with birds foraging singly or in pairs. Also similarly to that species, the brush bronzewing drinks at dawn or dusk, approaching watering holes cautiously after landing a short distance away.

=== Breeding ===
The Brush Bronzewing exhibits a breeding display similar to the common bronzewing, including a courtship display of bowing and a vocal advertisement of a low repeated 'hoop' or 'whoo' call. Breeding occurs mainly between September - January, however incubation of eggs and hatchlings has been observed all year round. The young are semi-altricial and nidicolous, requiring warmth, nourishment and a high level of parental care. The clutch usually consists of two eggs, which will be incubated for roughly 17 days and fledge after 16–20 days. Adult pairs will resume breeding 3–4 weeks after fledglings become independent.

Due to the shy and cautious nature of these birds, they will flush from their nests abruptly when they perceive a potential threat. This may be the cause of their low nesting success (~10%), with one study finding that seven young hatched from 29 eggs across 15 nests, of which only three survived to fledge.

=== Migration ===
The birds tend to reside within their local habitats, with no long distance banding recoveries being recorded and no large scale migrations apparent. In a study from 1967, one bird was recovered just 25 km from the initial banding site. These birds are rarely seen in flocking formation, preferring to move singly, in pairs or small family groups; the largest recorded gathering was a group of eight birds.

== Threats and conservation ==
The brush bronzewing is listed as a species of Least Concern on the IUCN Red List and considered by BirdLife Australia to have secure populations in all states it occurs in.

Like many other ground-dwelling bird species, the bronze brushwing is threatened by introduced predators such as cats and foxes. Like several other species, it appears to have increased toxicity to non-native mammalian predators due to feeding on Gastrolobium plants, which may contribute to the maintenance of biodiversity in south-west Western Australia.
