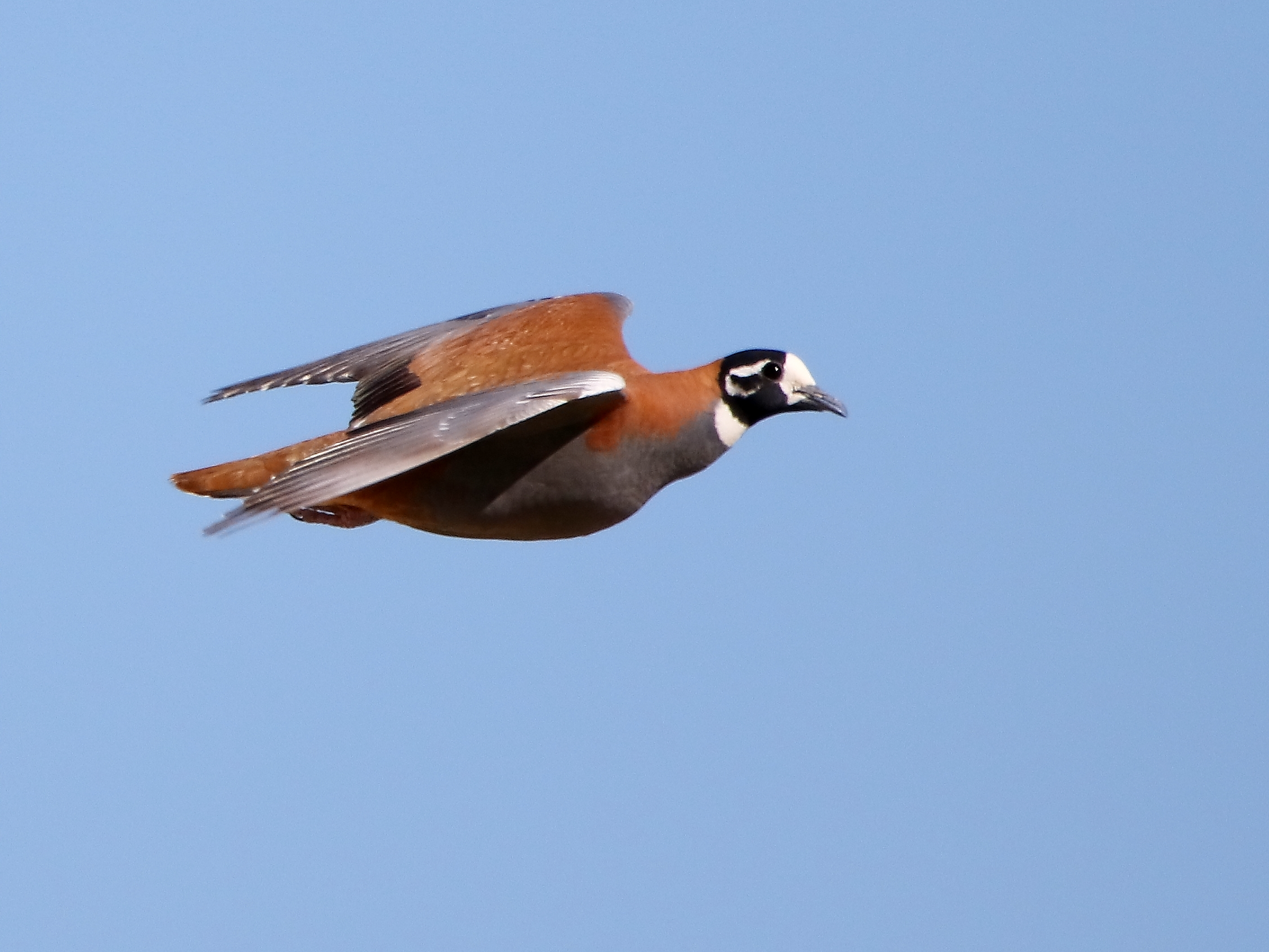

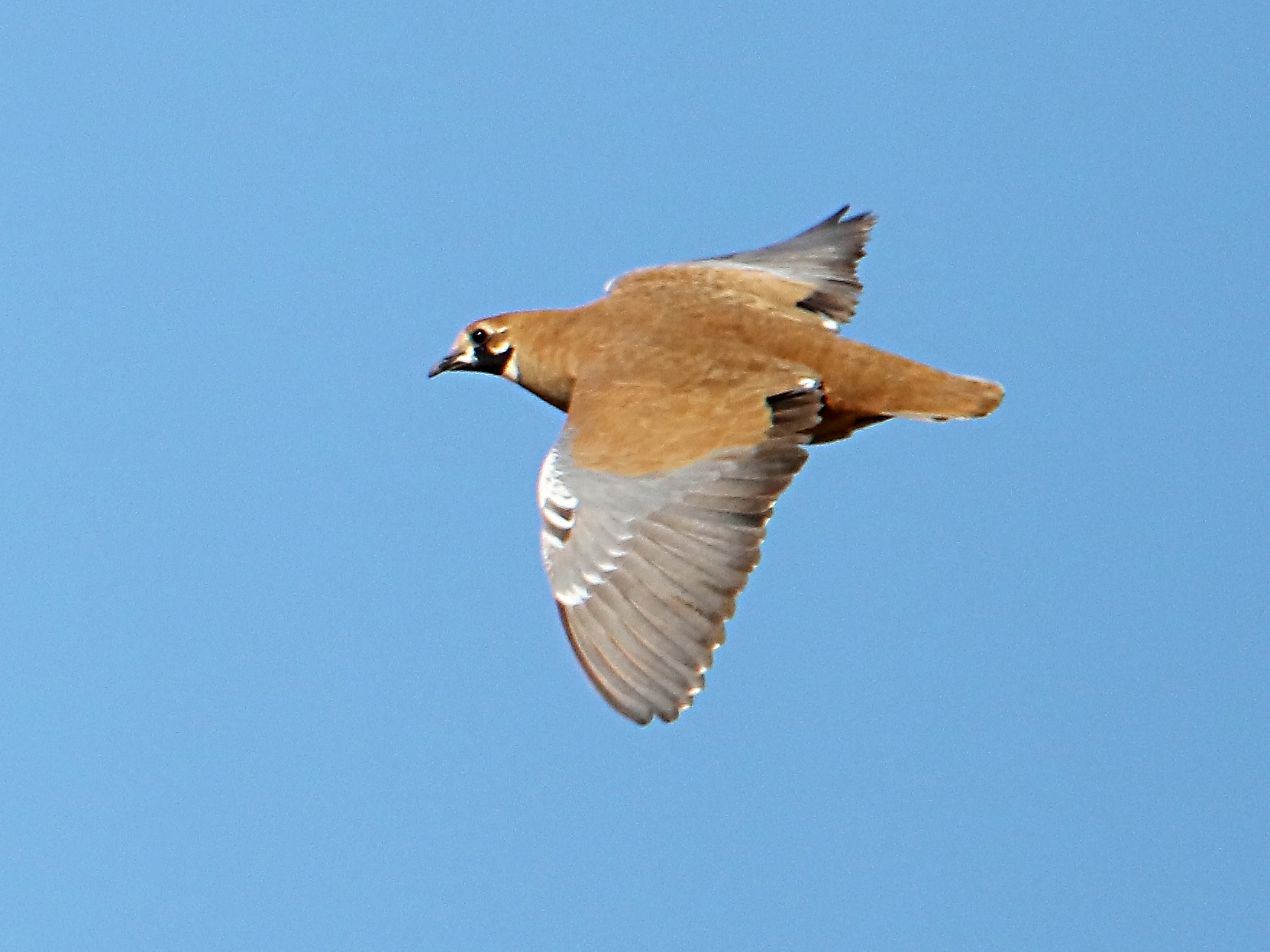
- Male (above) and female

Conservation status
- Least Concern (IUCN 3.1)

Scientific classification
- Kingdom: Animalia
- Phylum: Chordata
- Class: Aves
- Order: Columbiformes
- Family: Columbidae
- Genus: Phaps
- Species: P. histrionica

Binomial name
- Phaps histrionica (Gould, 1841)

= Flock bronzewing =

Species of bird

The flock bronzewing (Phaps histrionica), also known as the flock pigeon, harlequin bronzewing and the harlequin pigeon is a species of pigeon in the family Columbidae. It is endemic to drier parts of Australia.

== Taxonomy ==
English ornithologist John Gould first described the flock bronzewing, known then as the harlequin bronzewing, in volume five of his book The Birds of Australia. It was originally listed under the genus Persitera. His first sighting occurred in 1839 along the Mooki River (upper section of Namoi River) within the Liverpool Plains, New South Wales.

A syntype of Columba (Peristera) histrionica Gould (Bds. Austr., 1841. Pt.2. (March 1), pl. (13) = 5 pl. 66 of bound volume), an adult male, is held in the vertebrate zoology collection of National Museums Liverpool at World Museum, with accession number NML-VZ D1486b. The specimen was collected in Namoi, New South Wales in December 1839. The specimen was purchased by John Gould and came to the Liverpool national collection via the 13th Earl of Derby's collection which was bequeathed to the people of Liverpool in 1851. There are two other syntypes in the collections of the Academy of Natural Sciences of Philadelphia.

The Gamilaraay people of northern New South Wales use the name galimaramara to refer to this species.

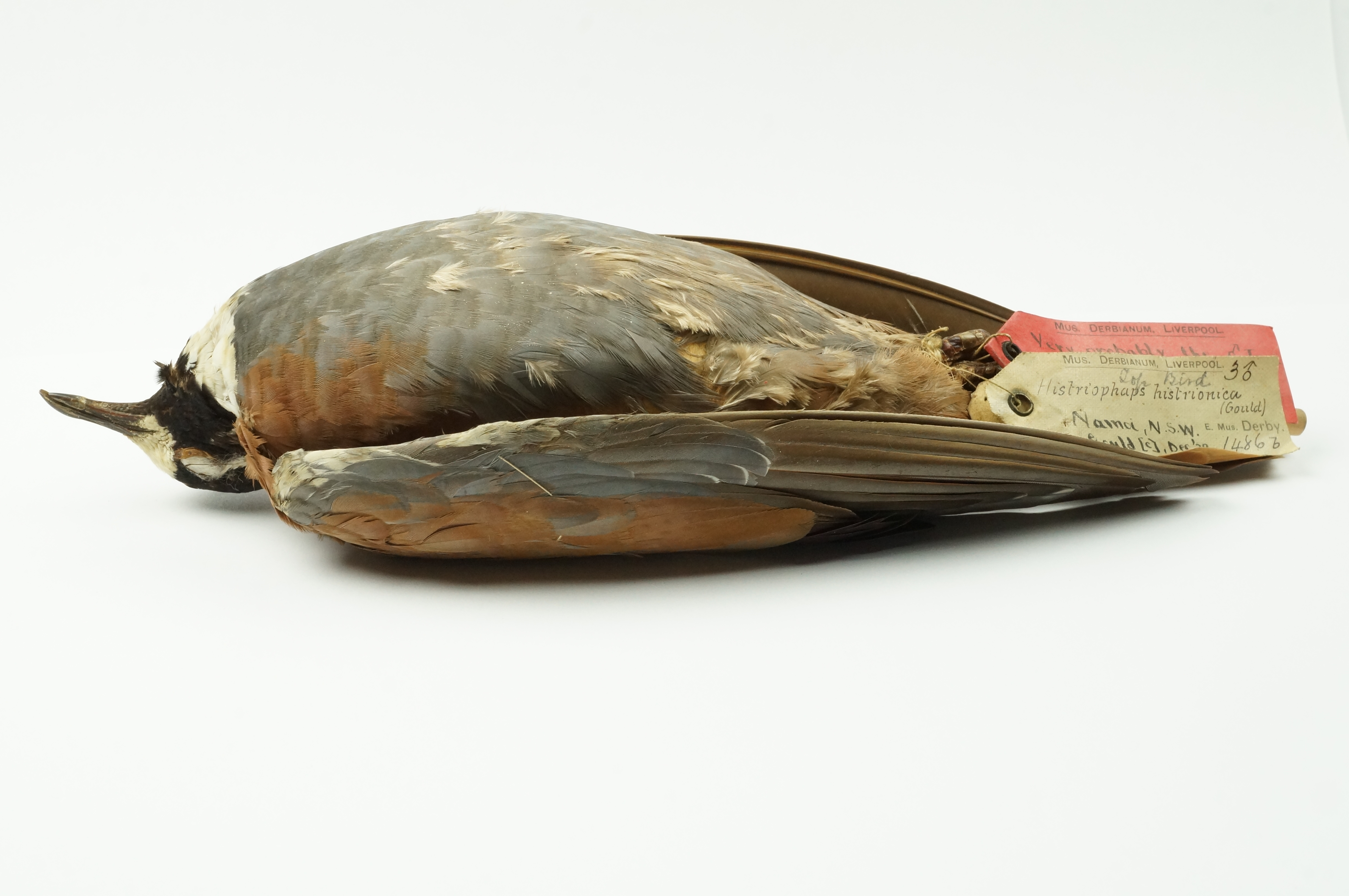
Syntype of Peristera histrionica Gould (NML-VZ D1486b) held at World Museum, National Museums Liverpool

== Description ==
The flock bronzewing is the most nomadic of the Australian pigeons, and it is difficult to mistake for other Australian species. Fully grown flock bronzewings can range in length from 280–305 mm with a wing length of 189–216 mm. Its weight can range from 260–320 grams.

=== Adult male ===
The adult male's head is black except for the white forehead, patch on lower throat, and white line that runs from behind the eye almost enclosing ear coverts forming a broken ring. The upperparts and wings are a reddish sandy brown. The primary coverts and alula are grey with white margins. The primaries are grey with chestnut inner webs; all but the outer three are tipped white. The secondaries are grey except for the inner secondaries, which have a chestnut inner web. The iris is dark brown and the bill is black.

=== Adult female ===
The upper section including the crown and forehead are sandy-brown. The black and white chin, face and throat markings are very dull compared to the male. There is a sandy-brown section across the foreneck and another difference is that the primaries are not tipped white.

=== Juvenile ===
Juveniles look most similar to the adult females, but have some differences such as missing or less distinct facial markings; the primaries and some secondaries are tipped brown and the bill is horn- coloured.

== Food ==
The main source of food is the seeds of grasses, herbs and shrubs, though the species occasionally browses on green shoots. With the introduction of cattle into the interior of Australia, the flock bronzewing has adapted to eating the undigested seeds from cattle dung. Some species of seed eaten include desert spurge, camel bush, yellow daisy and river grass.

== Habitat ==
More than any other Australian pigeon, the flock bronzewing is adapted to the arid plains of the continent. The preferred habitat is open grassland plains, clumped grasses and small shrubs with open spaces. A major area for this type of habitat where the flock bronzewings are present is within the grass plains of the Barkly Tableland.

== Breeding ==
The breeding season is variable and relies heavily on the availability of food. In the south of its range, they tend to breed from spring to early summer and in the north, breeding occurs from early to the middle of the dry season. The nest is a scrape in the ground, which is lined with grass and twigs, usually between the shelter of clumps of grass or shrubs. Two white eggs are incubated for 16 days, with the young capable of leaving the nest after a week.

== Distribution ==
The flock bronzewing is most abundant within the Barkly Tablelands of eastern Northern Territory and Western Queensland; however, their range is quite large and they will occasionally be found in the Kimberly region of Western Australia, northern South Australia and northwestern New South Wales. They are no longer found in the type locality on the Liverpool Plains, NSW.

== Threats ==
The main impact on flock bronzewings has been through pastoralism. In the mid- to late 1800s, many observers wrote about the enormous flocks of the flock pigeons within areas where they are now just occasional visitors such as northern South Australia and western New South Wales. Pastoralism has affected both populations and range as stock feed on the grasses that the flock bronzewings require for food and nesting sites. Another threat to the flock bronzewing is through predation; they are vulnerable to predation as they lay their eggs on the ground.
