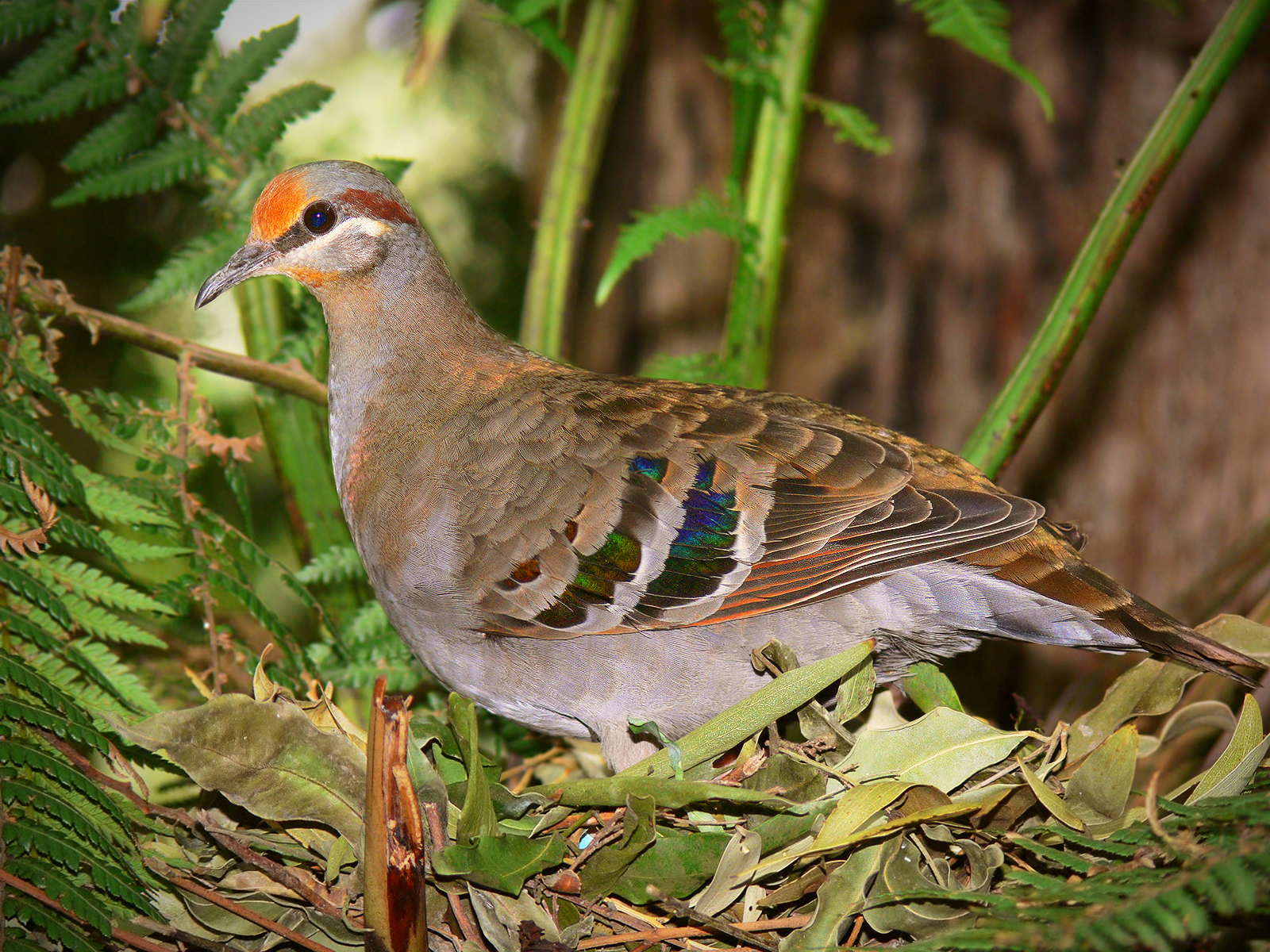
- Brush bronzewing on nest

Scientific classification
- Domain: Eukaryota
- Kingdom: Animalia
- Phylum: Chordata
- Class: Aves
- Order: Columbiformes
- Family: Columbidae
- Subfamily: Columbinae
- Genus: Phaps; Selby, 1835

Species
- See text

= Phaps =

Genus of birds

Phaps is a genus of bronzewing pigeons in the family Columbidae that are native to Australia.

The genus was introduced in 1835 by the English naturalist Prideaux John Selby with the common bronzewing (Phaps chalcoptera) as the type species. The genus name Phaps (φάψ) is the Ancient Greek word for a wild pigeon.

The genus contains three species:

Genus Phaps – Selby, 1835 – three species
| Common name | Scientific name and subspecies | Range | Size and ecology | IUCN status and estimated population |
|---|---|---|---|---|
| Common bronzewing | Phaps chalcoptera (Latham, 1790) | Australia | Size: Habitat: Diet: | LC |
| Brush bronzewing | Phaps elegans (Temminck, 1809) | Australia | Size: Habitat: Diet: | LC |
| Flock bronzewing | Phaps histrionica (Gould, 1841) | Australia | Size: Habitat: Diet: | LC |
