= Euphorbia tannensis subsp. eremophila =

Scientific classification
- Kingdom: Plantae
- Clade: Tracheophytes
- Clade: Angiosperms
- Clade: Eudicots
- Clade: Rosids
- Order: Malpighiales
- Family: Euphorbiaceae
- Genus: Euphorbia
- Species: E. tannensis
- Subspecies: E. t. subsp. eremophila

Trinomial name
- Euphorbia tannensis subsp. eremophila (A.Cunn.) D.C.Hassall

Subspecies of flowering plant

Euphorbia tannensis subsp. eremophila, commonly known as desert spurge, is a subspecies of herb or shrub native to Australia.

== Description ==
It grows as an erect shrub, usually up to a metre in height, but sometimes up to 1.5 metres, with green or yellow flowers. From a distance it may appear leafless.

== Taxonomy ==
This taxon was first published by Allan Cunningham in 1848, at species rank as Euphorbia eremophila. In 1977 David Hassall demoted it to a variety of E. tannensis. At the same time he did the same thing for E. finlaysonii, and since he felt these two to be more closely related to each other than either is to the type material of E. tannensis, he erected E. tannensis subsp. eremophila to hold both varieties. Thus this subspecies comprises two varieties: E. tannensis var. eremophila and E. tannensis var. finlaysonii.

== Distribution and habitat ==
This subspecies is widespread on the Australian mainland, occurring in every mainland state, though only in the far north-west corner of Victoria.
