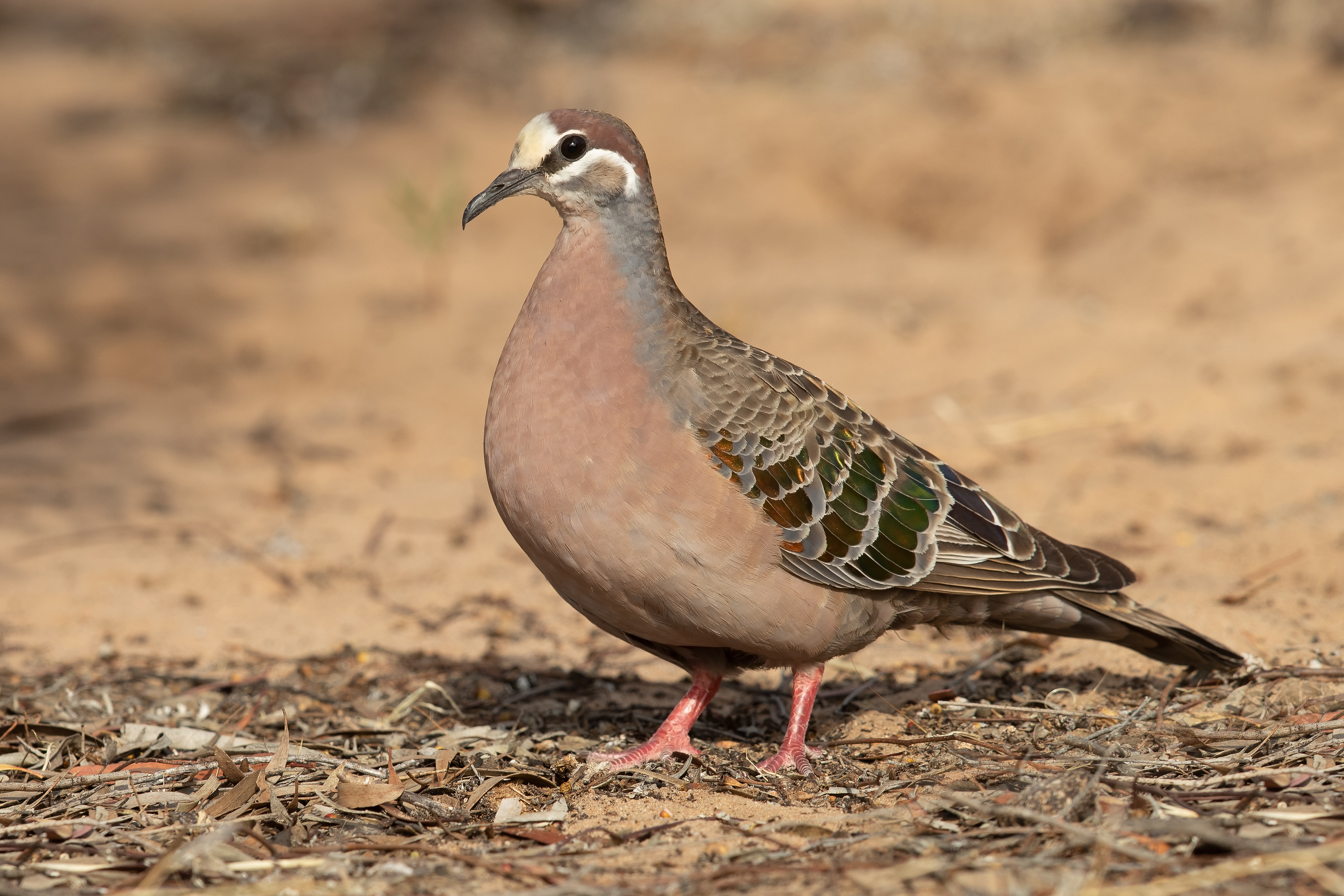
- Male
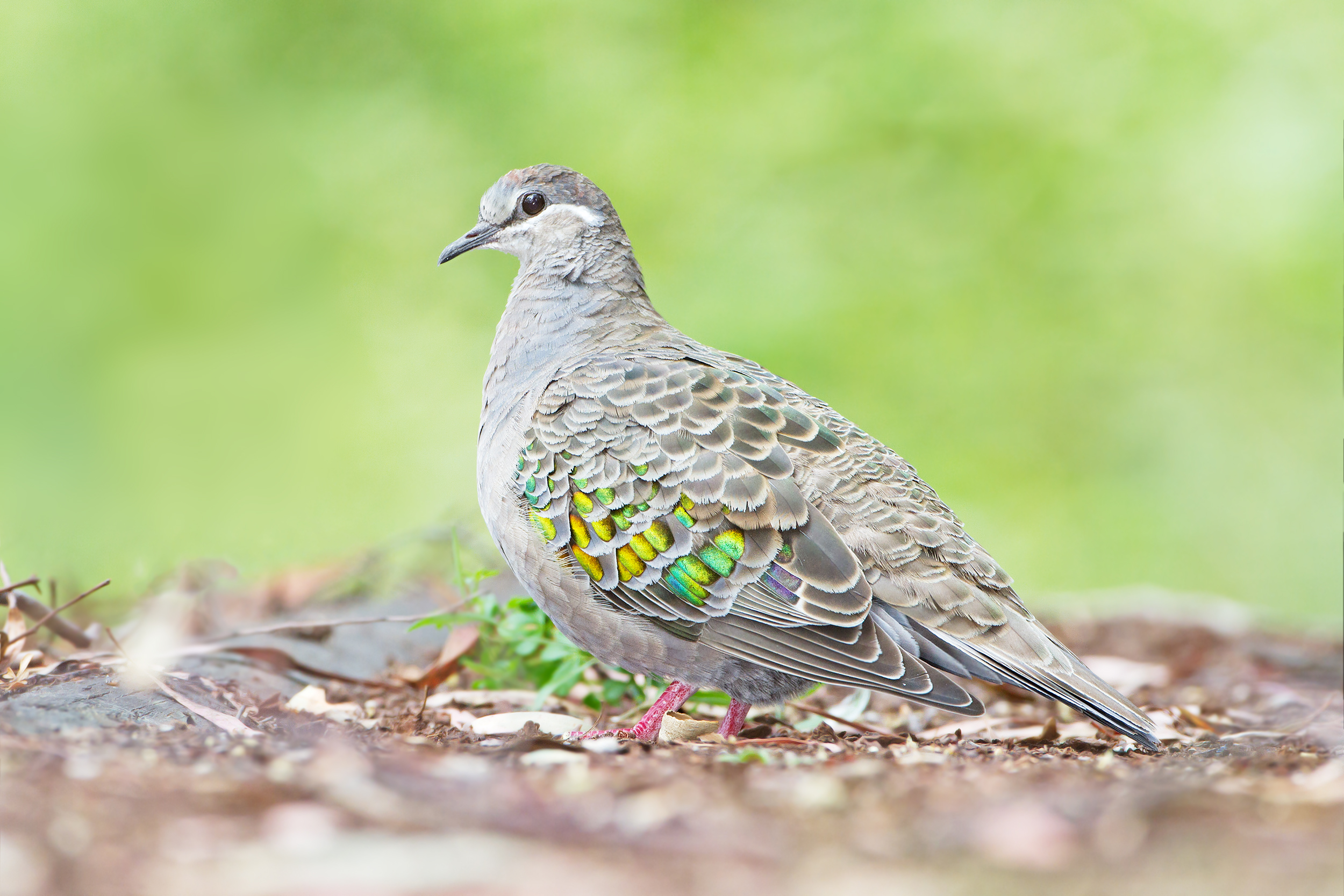
- Female

Conservation status
- Least Concern (IUCN 3.1)

Scientific classification
- Kingdom: Animalia
- Phylum: Chordata
- Class: Aves
- Order: Columbiformes
- Family: Columbidae
- Genus: Phaps
- Species: P. chalcoptera

Binomial name
- Phaps chalcoptera (Latham, 1790)
- Natural range

= Common bronzewing =

Species of bird

The common bronzewing (Phaps chalcoptera) is a species of medium-sized, heavily built pigeon. Native to Australia and one of the country's most common pigeons, the common bronzewing is able to live in almost any habitat, with the possible exception of very barren areas and dense rainforests. Its advertising call is an extraordinary mournful whooo repeated at metronomic intervals.

== Description ==
Males of the species have pale-yellow to yellow-white foreheads, and pink breasts. Both males and females have an easily discernible white line around and proximate to their eyes. Common bronzewings also have patches of red, blue and green on their wings, a feature which is characteristic of all bronzewing pigeons. Young birds are usually duller in colour and browner than the mature common bronzewing.

Rarely found far from a source of water, common bronzewings either travel alone or in pairs or in flocks, and are usually cautious, making approach by humans or other animals difficult. Common bronzewings are, on average, between 30 and 36 centimetres (12–14 in) in length.

== Feeding ==
The common bronzewing's diet primarily consists of seeds and all varieties of vegetables. It searches for food in small groups. The search can sometimes last for days, and, since the pigeon must drink frequently, it utilizes watering holes or any other available source of water.

== Breeding ==
Common bronzewings construct a rough nest of twigs and sticks, which is placed low down in a tree or bush. The eggs are incubated by both parents and hatch after roughly 14 to 16 days. Both parents share the responsibility of caring for the young. In common with other pigeons, common bronzewings release a milky substance from their crop to feed their young.

== Gallery ==
The mournful, metronomic whooo call of the common bronzewing

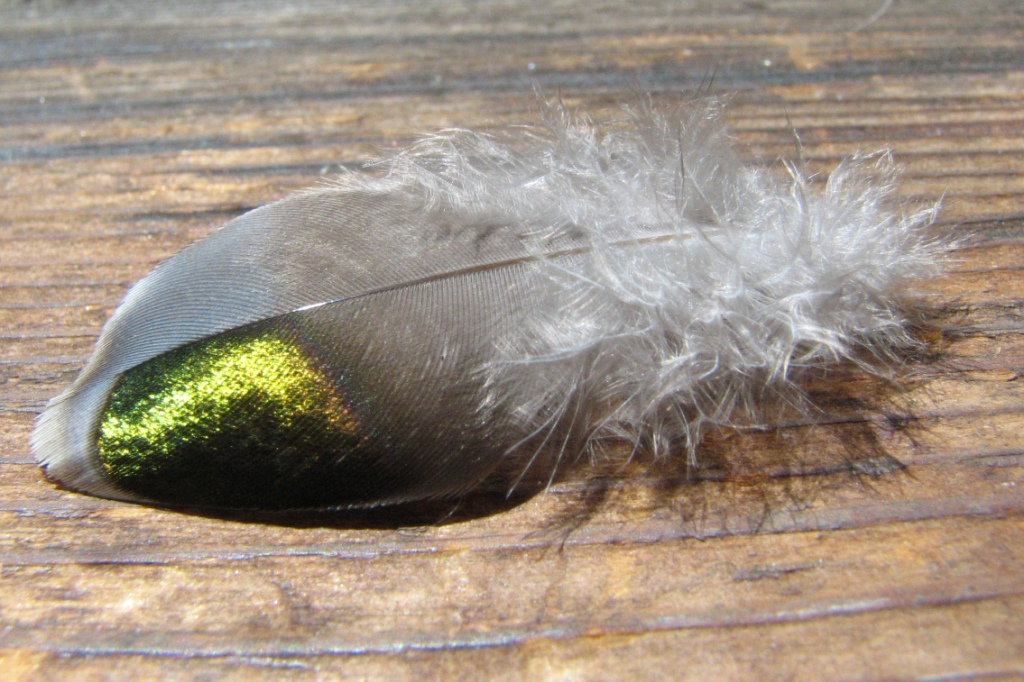
A feather showing the brilliant sheen of the common bronzewing

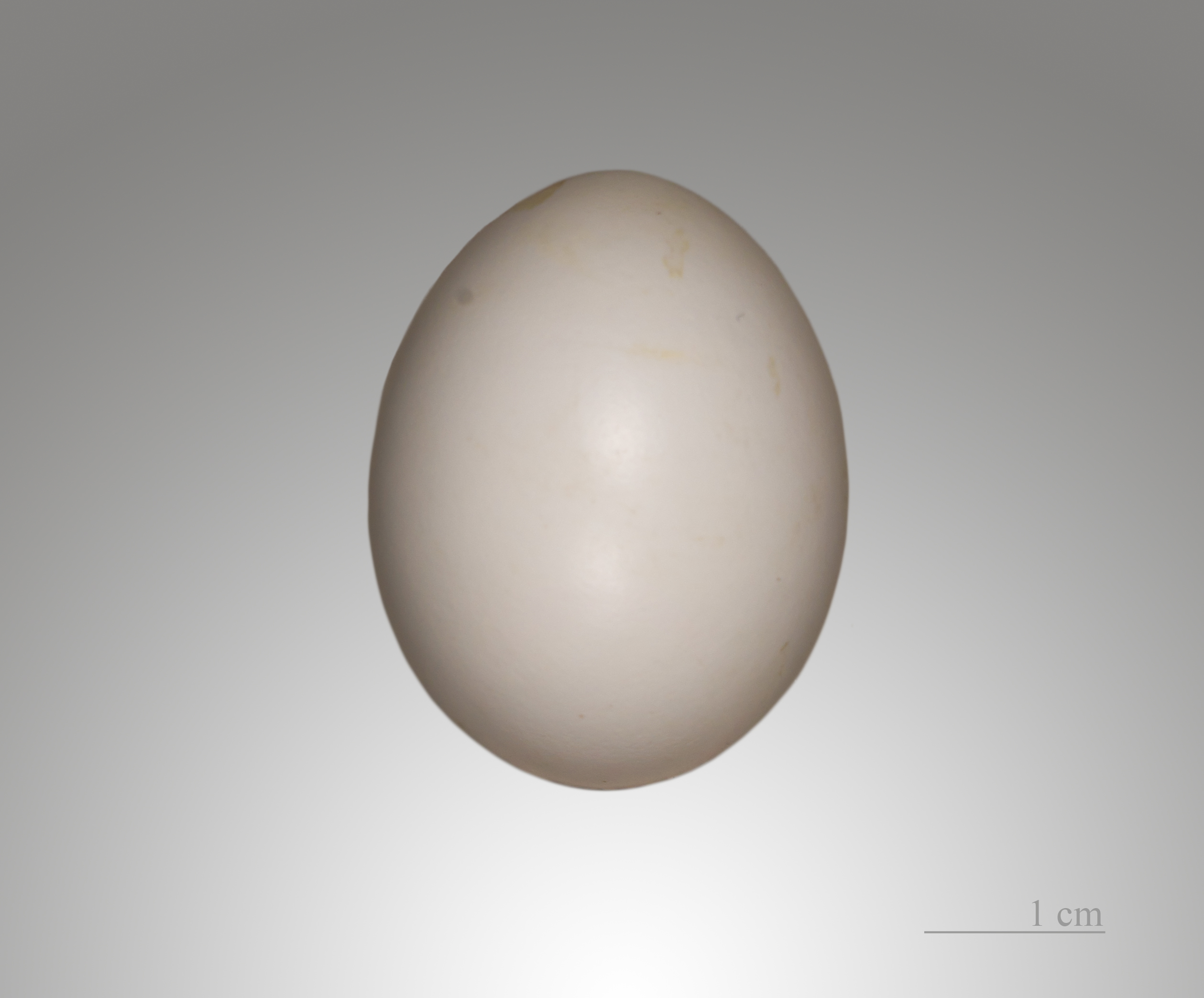
Egg

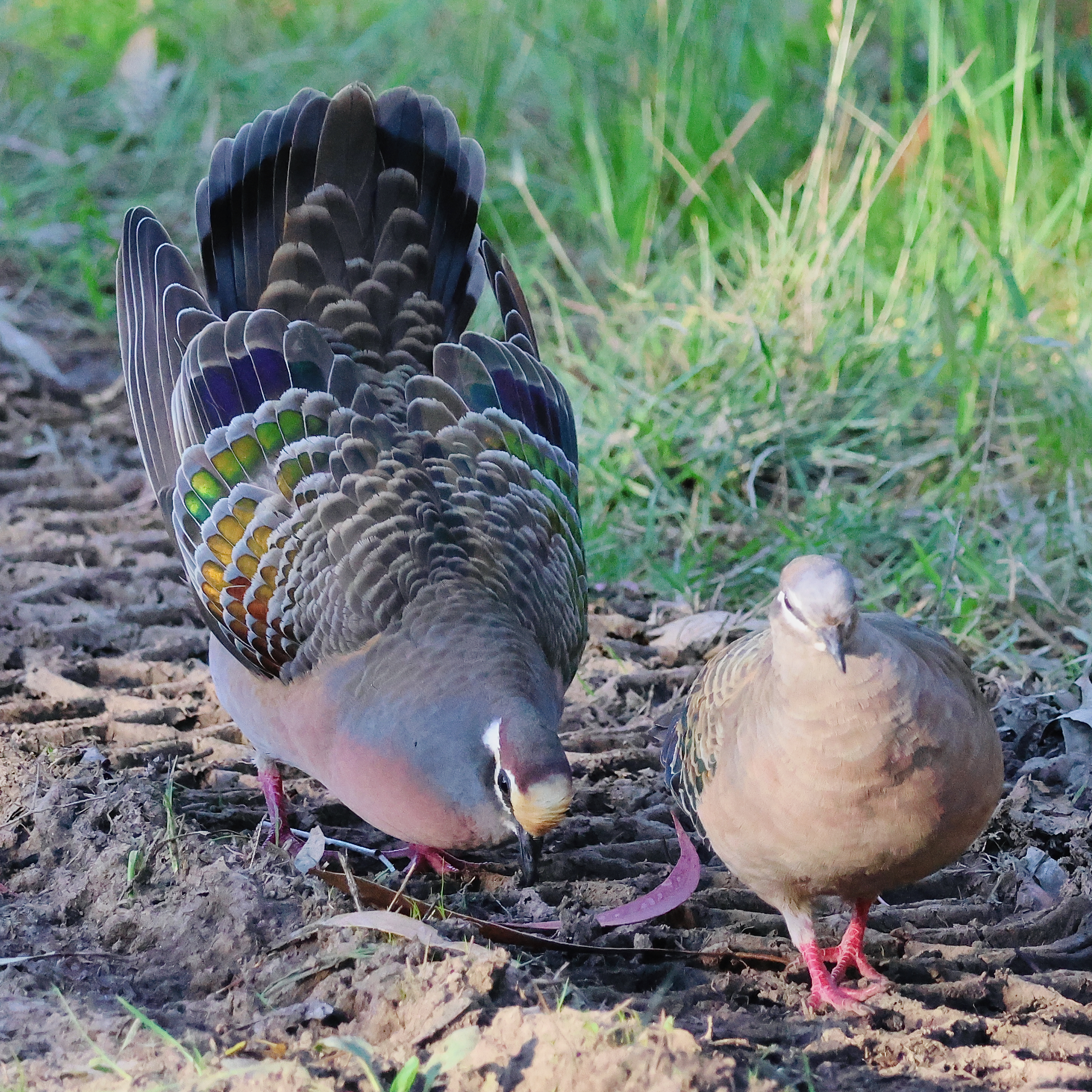
During courtship, the male bows his head to the female and fans his tail to show off his iridescent feathers.
