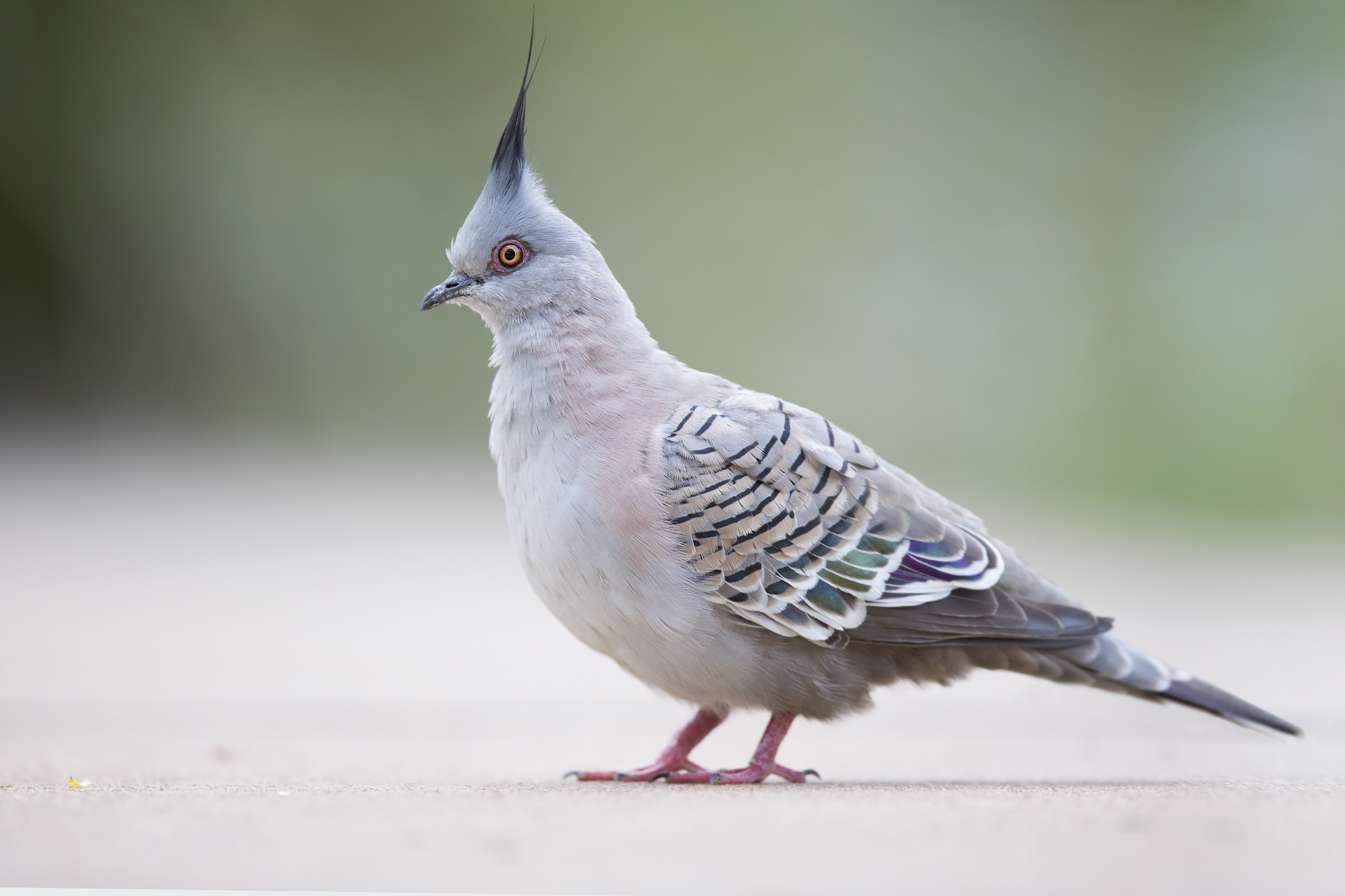

Conservation status
- Least Concern (IUCN 3.1)

Scientific classification
- Kingdom: Animalia
- Phylum: Chordata
- Class: Aves
- Order: Columbiformes
- Family: Columbidae
- Tribe: Phabini
- Genus: Ocyphaps; G.R. Gray, 1842
- Species: O. lophotes

Binomial name
- Ocyphaps lophotes (Temminck, 1822)

= Crested pigeon =

Species of bird

The crested pigeon (Ocyphaps lophotes) is a bird found widely throughout mainland Australia except for the far northern tropical areas. Only two Australian pigeon species possess an erect crest, the crested pigeon and the spinifex pigeon. The crested pigeon is the larger of the two species. The crested pigeon is sometimes referred to as a wire-wing or a topknot pigeon, a common name shared with the reddish crested Lopholaimus antarcticus of Eastern Australia.

== Taxonomy ==
The species was described in 1822 by Temminck; it is the only species in the genus Ocyphaps, established by G.R. Gray in 1842. Two subspecies are recognized: O. l. lophotes, the nominate subspecies, occurring across the south of the continent; and O. l. whitlocki, occurring in regions of the centre and north of Western Australia. The taxon was named for F. Lawson Whitlock, who made important collections of bird specimens in those areas.

The species has also been placed as Geophaps, perhaps allied with Geophaps plumifera. Common names for the species, aside from crested or topknot pigeon, characterise them as a bronzewing or dove that is likewise distinguished by the crest.

== Description ==
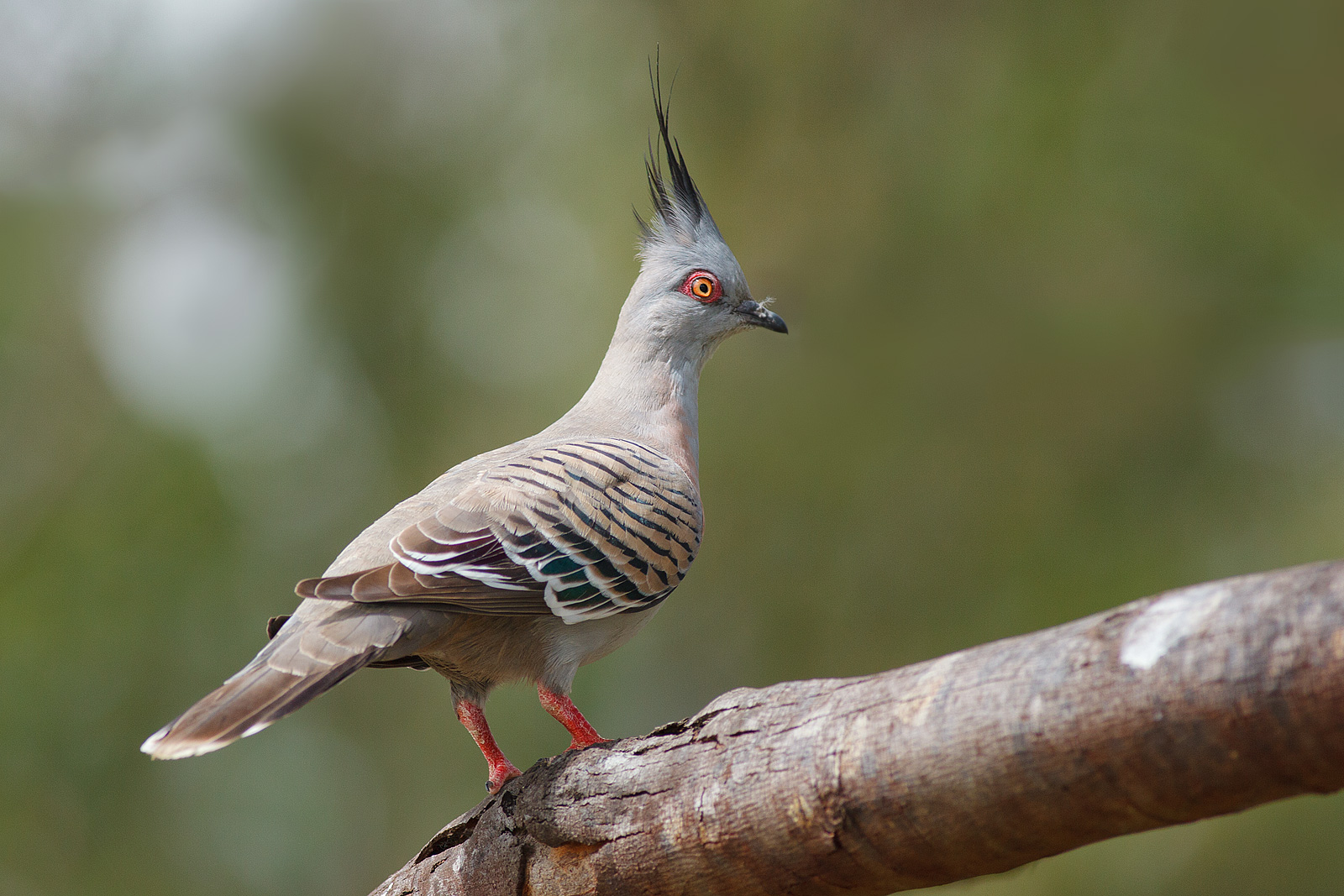

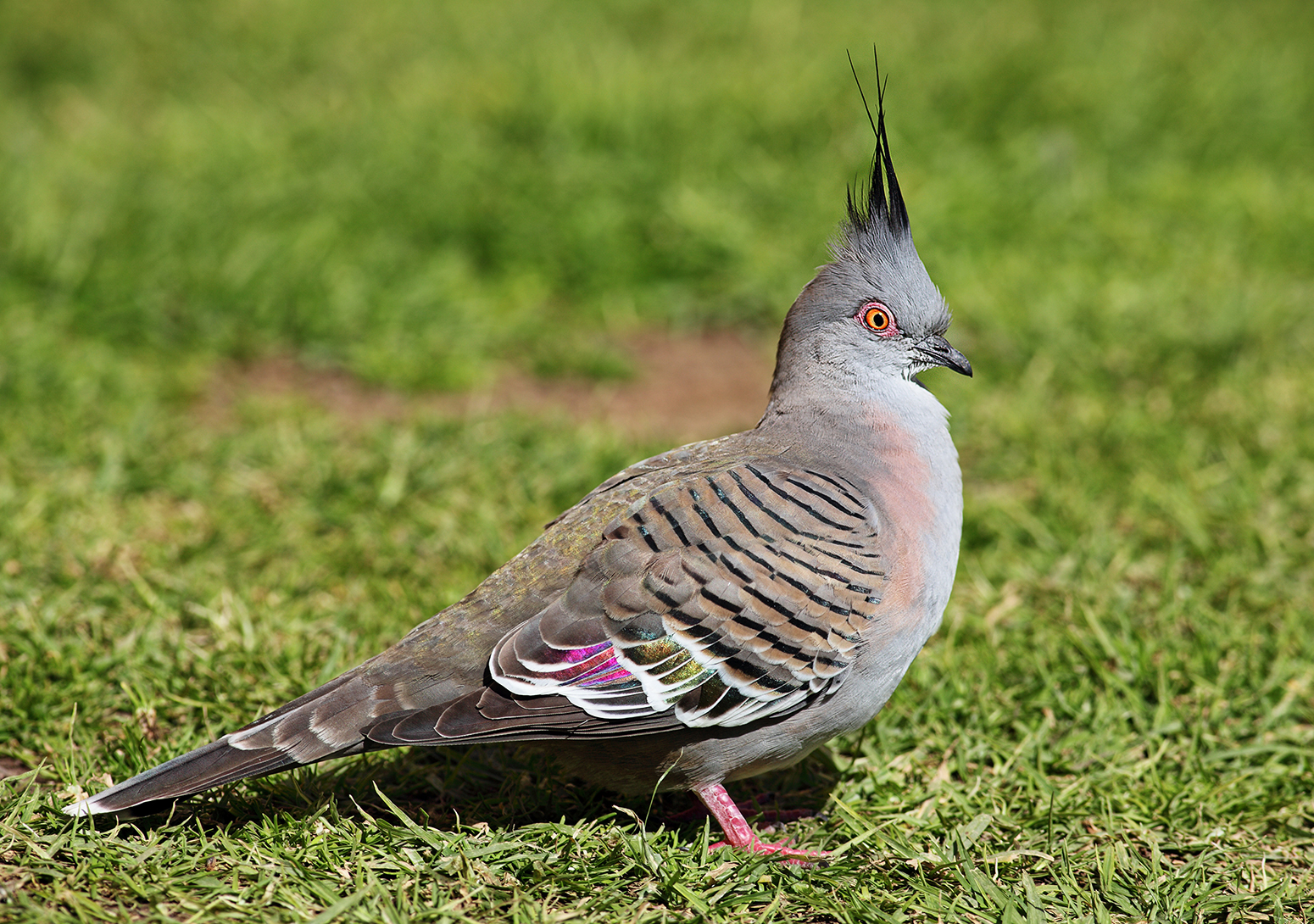

The length of the crested pigeon varies from 30 to 34 cm (12 to 13 in). Colouration is grey with tinges of brown, pink and green. It has a feathered, but slender, black spike on top of the head. It runs with the crest erect. The periorbital skin is bright orange. Wings have black stripes and are bronzed, while the primary feathers have iridescent areas of brown, purple, blue, and green. Immature birds have duller colours with no bronzing on the wings. The birds can be normally seen in two sizes, they can be thin or plumped. It is almost impossible to tell if a crested pigeon is male or female, because they have the same plumage.

If startled, the crested pigeon takes to the air with a distinctive whistling 'call', the source of the noise can be attributed to the way the air rushes over a modified primary feather found on the wings.

== Distribution and habitat ==
The crested pigeon is found in lightly wooded grasslands in both rural and urban areas, but they can also be seen at watercourses, homestead gardens, pastoral areas, sports grounds, and golf courses. Their habitat has expanded rapidly since settlement has produced pastoral lands (previously they were only found in inland and Western Australia). Foraging for grains, they have adapted to grain farming areas, often feeding on the noxious weed of Echium plantagineum.

== Behaviour ==
SE Queensland, Australia

Their most distinctive behaviour is the beating and whistling sound their wings make when they take off. This is most likely to draw the attention of predators to birds on the wing, and away from any birds remaining on the ground, and as an alarm call to other pigeons. When the birds land, their tails tilt upwards and the flight patterns are similar to those of the spotted turtle dove. They can be highly social and tend to be seen in flocks of varying sizes. They are highly gregarious birds when in contact with humans.

=== Breeding ===
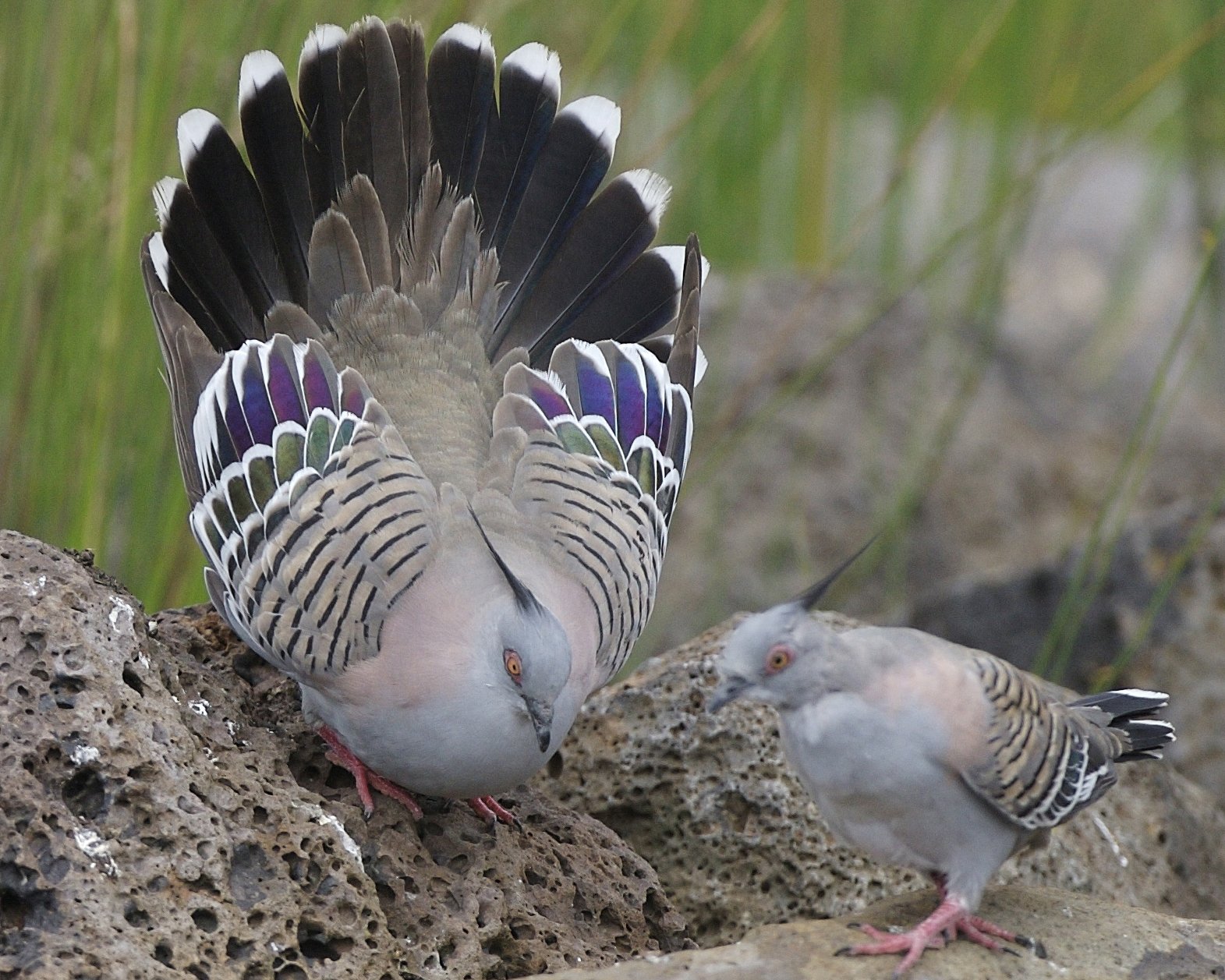
Mating display

While they breed throughout the year, it is more common in the warmer months. Males approach females and begin an elaborate mating dance; they bob their bodies up and down, while opening and closing their wings like a fan with each bob. This is accompanied by a soft hooting which is timed with the bobbing. If the female is interested, she remains generally stationary as the male approaches, until copulation is attempted. Nesting usually occurs in shrubs or trees. Nests usually consist of a platform of twigs. They lay two oval, white, glossy eggs. The eggs usually hatch 3 weeks after they were laid. Both parents incubate the eggs for around 15 to 19 days.
