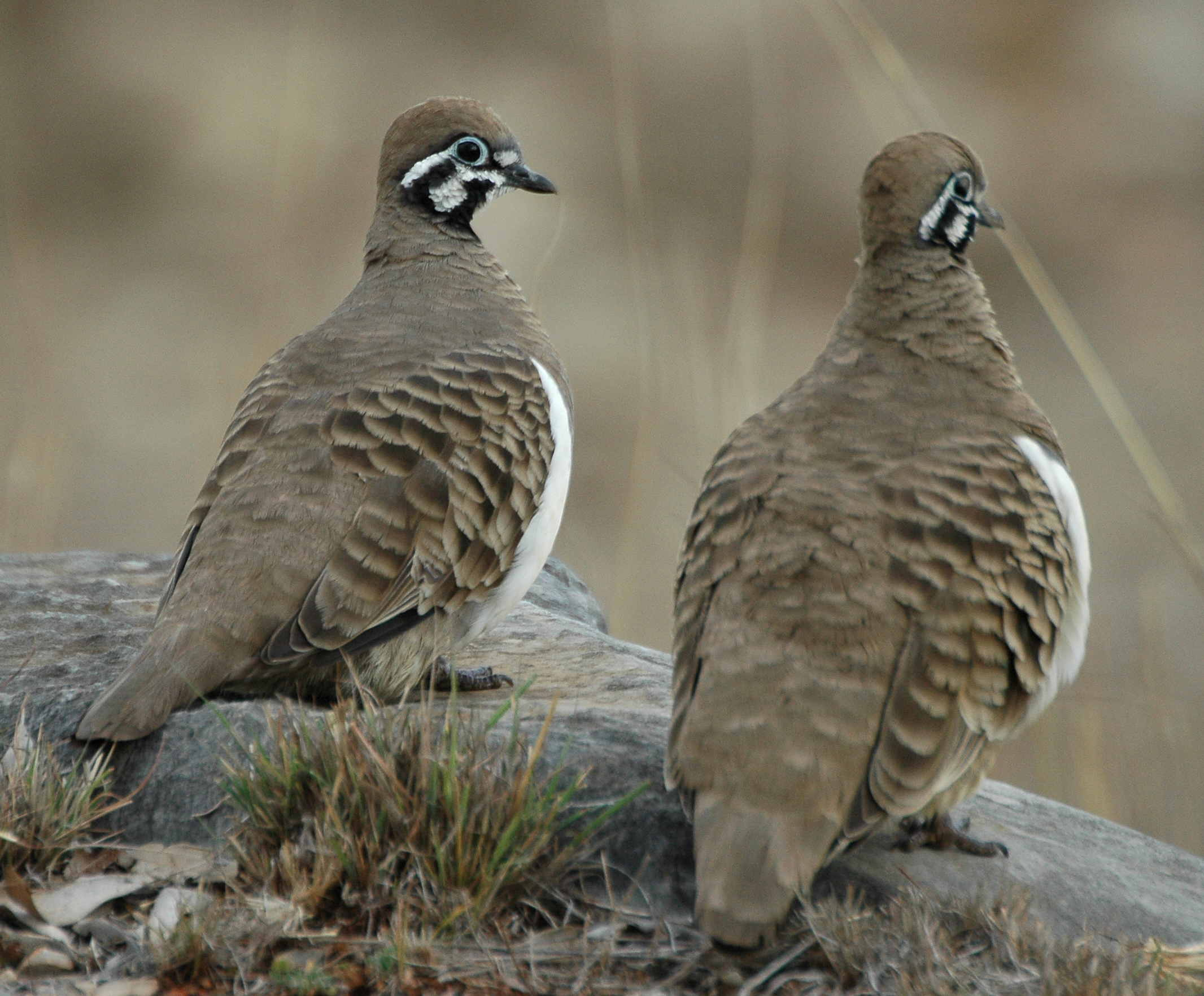

Conservation status
- Least Concern (IUCN 3.1)

Scientific classification
- Kingdom: Animalia
- Phylum: Chordata
- Class: Aves
- Order: Columbiformes
- Family: Columbidae
- Genus: Geophaps
- Species: G. scripta

Binomial name
- Geophaps scripta (Temminck, 1821)

= Squatter pigeon =

Species of bird

The squatter pigeon (Geophaps scripta) is a species of bird in the family Columbidae. It is endemic to northeastern Australia. According to Australia's then Department of the Environment and Energy, the nominate subspecies, southern squatter pigeon (Geophapa scripta scripta) is listed as vulnerable. It lives in arid and semi-arid areas, including grasslands and dry sclerophyll forests, and nests in shallow depressions in the ground. About 95% of the diet of these birds consists of seeds, as they are known for foraging on the ground.

== Distribution ==
The known distribution of the southern squatter pigeon extends south of the Cape York Peninsula, to the Border Rivers region of northern New South Wales, and the south east of Queensland. The subspecies remains common north of the Carnarvon Ranges, considered a subpopulation. In 2000, the population was estimated at 40,000 breeding birds.

== Description ==
It measures approximately 30 cm in length, weighing between 190 g and 250 g. Adults are mainly a grey-brown, with distinctive black and white facial markings and a white stripe up each of its sides. Blue-grey skin around the eyes, dark brown and patches of iridescent green or violet on the upper wings, blue-grey on the lower breast and belly, and a white lower region. The sexes are similar in appearance.

Juveniles can be distinguished by their duller colouring, less distinctive facial stripes, and paler facial skin.

== Subspecies ==
There are two subspecies of squatter pigeon; the southern (G. s. scripta) and the northern squatter pigeon (G. s. peninsulae). Southerns tend to be slightly larger, and the subspecies can be differentiated by the colour of the skin around the eyes. Evidence suggests that hybridisation can occur where the distributions of the northern and southern squatter pigeons overlap.

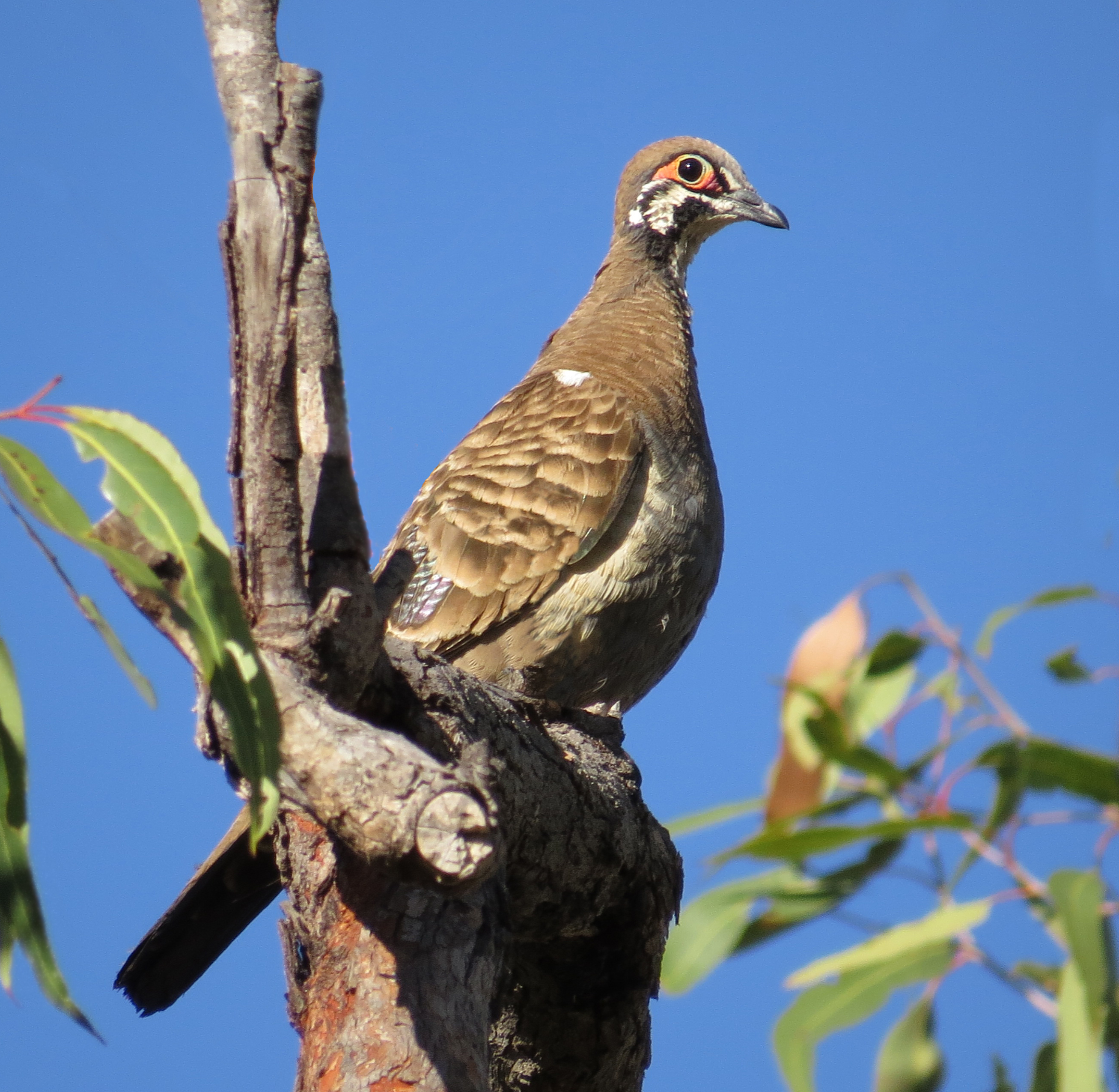
The northern form differs with pink skin around the eye.
