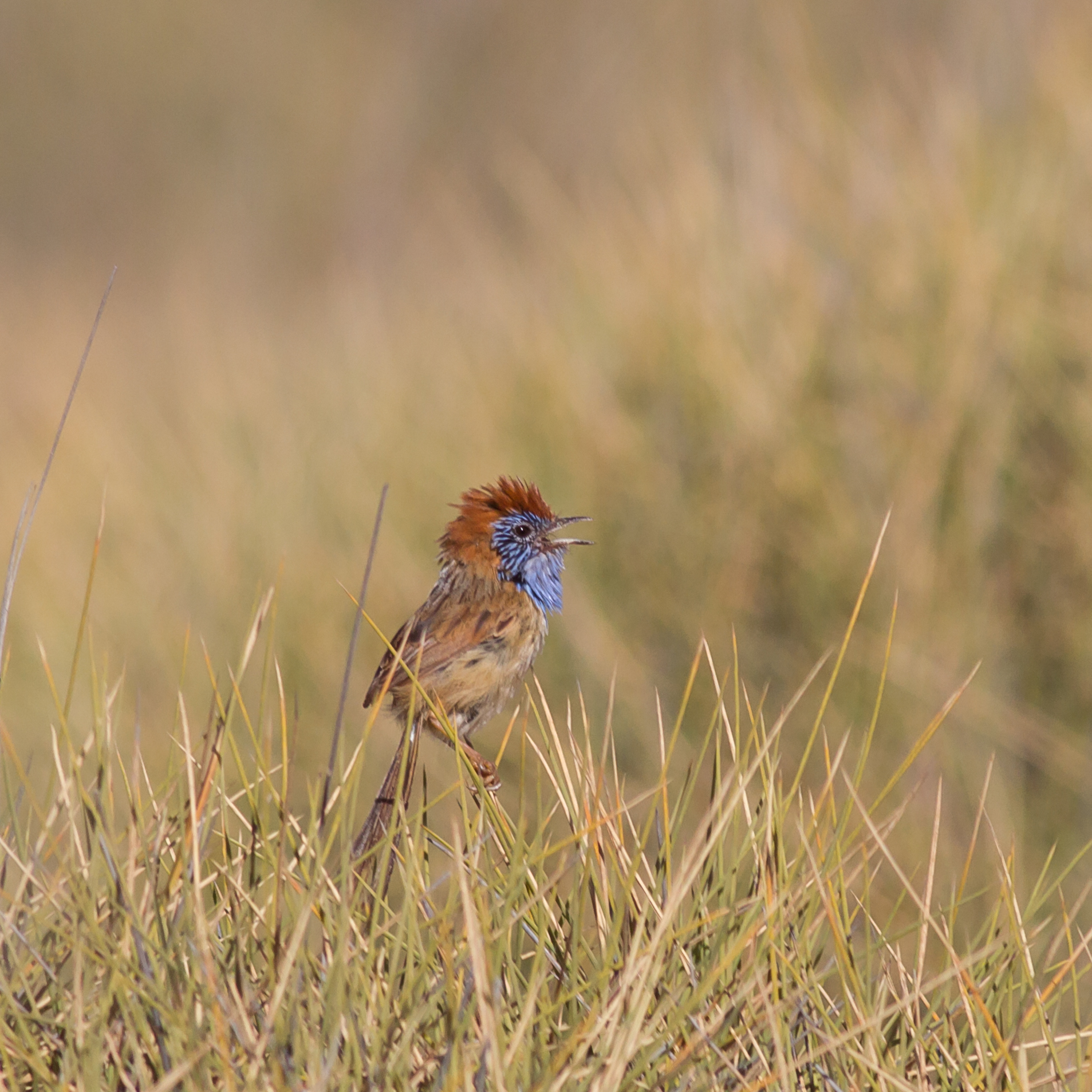

Conservation status
- Least Concern (IUCN 3.1)

Scientific classification
- Kingdom: Animalia
- Phylum: Chordata
- Class: Aves
- Order: Passeriformes
- Family: Maluridae
- Genus: Stipiturus
- Species: S. ruficeps

Binomial name
- Stipiturus ruficeps Campbell, AJ, 1899

= Rufous-crowned emu-wren =

Species of bird

The rufous-crowned emu-wren (Stipiturus ruficeps) is a species of bird in the Australasian wren family, Maluridae. It is endemic to Australia.

== Taxonomy and systematics ==
The rufous-crowned emu-wren is one of three species of the genus Stipiturus, commonly known as emu-wrens, found across southern and central Australia. It was first described in 1899 by Archibald James Campbell, more than a century after its relative the southern emu-wren. Its species name is derived from the Latin words rufus "red" and caput "head". No subspecies are recognised, although birds from Western Australia may have redder plumage, and females more blue on the face and lores. It has been considered a subspecies of both the southern and mallee emu-wrens in the past. The common name of the genus is derived from the resemblance of their tails to the feathers of an emu.

== Description ==
The rufous-crowned emu-wren is the smallest and most brightly coloured of the three emu-wren species. The adult male has reddish upperparts with faint streaks, with a prominently rufous crown and grey-brown wings. It has a bright sky blue throat, upper chest, lores and ear coverts. The lores and ear coverts, and chest border are streaked with black. The tail is double the body length, and is composed of six filamentous feathers, the central two of which are longer than the lateral ones. The underparts are buff. The bill, feet and eyes are brown. The female resembles the male but lacks much of the blue plumage and redder crown. Its throat is a yellow buff, and it has some blue-tinged streaked ear coverts. Its bill is pale brown.

== Distribution and habitat ==
The rufous-crowned emu-wren is found across the arid interior of northern central Australia, from the Simpson Desert in the southeast and Barkly Tableland in the northeast, across the centre to the Western Australian coast and the Pilbara in the northwest. There is also an isolated population found to the east in south-western Queensland bounded by Dajarra, Winton, Fermoy and Boulia. It lives in spinifex shrubland.
