= Charles Clifton Brittlebank =

Australian botanist (1862–1945)

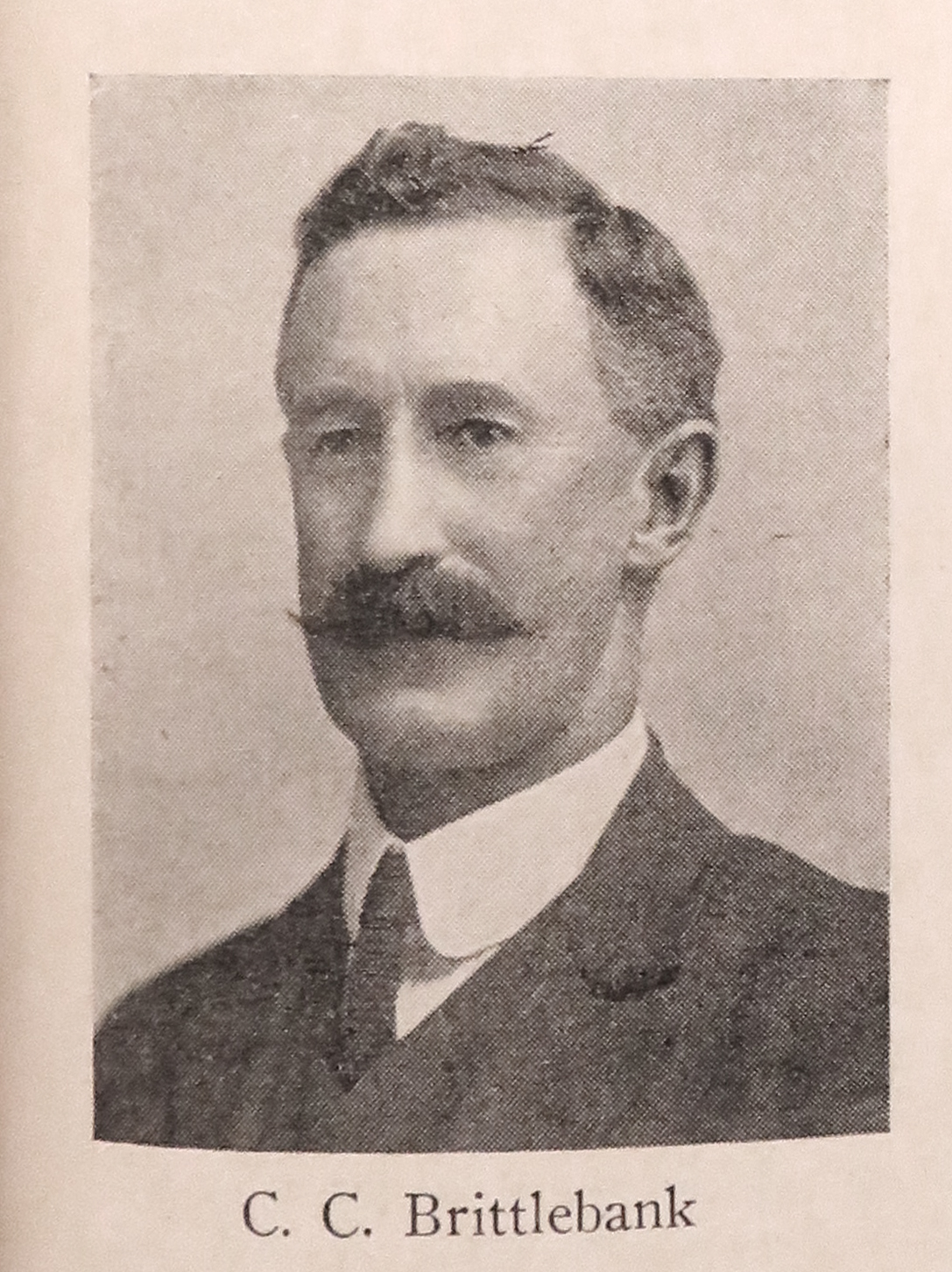
- Born: 1 January 1863; Darley, Derbyshire, England
- Died: 3 November 1945 (aged 82); Caulfield, Victoria, Australia
- Spouse: Sarah Jane Palmer (1861–1935)
- Children: Cyril Clifton Brittlebank (1895–1918)
- Parents: Andrew William Thomas Brittlebank (1838–1877) (father); Ellen Sarah Leese (1837–1906) (mother)

Charles Clifton Brittlebank (1 Jan 1863 – 3 Nov 1945) was an Australian plant pathologist, mycologist (fungi specialist), scientific illustrator, university lecturer and farmer (near Bacchus Marsh, Victoria). In all of his endeavours he became outstanding in his field, gaining international acclaim for his discoveries and publications. In February 1992 he was officially commemorated by the naming of the road Brittlebank Circuit, in the suburb of Banks, in Canberra, Australian Capital Territory.

== Ancestors ==
From 17th to 19th centuries the Brittlebank family was well-established in Wirksworth, in the Peak District of Derbyshire in England. The family prospered as (amongst other things) members of the legal profession and owners of lead mines. In 1700 Hugh Brittlebank (1675–1764) moved from Wirksworth to the village at the centre of lead mining, Winster, becoming the owner of the substantial manor house and grounds, Oddo House.

Hugh Brittlebank's family came to own most of the village of Winster. They were at the centre of dramatic events in 1821 when they seem to have overstepped the mark, as the Times (London, England) reported on 2 June 1821: three of Hugh's great-great-grandsons forced a local doctor, William Cuddie, into a duel at which he was mortally wounded. The shooter, William Brittlebank, then disappeared completely. The other two brothers involved, Andrew and Francis, were tried for murder but were acquitted, in August 1821.

== Parents and siblings ==
A fourth brother, not involved in the duel, was Thomas Brittlebank (1797–1838) whose son, Andrew William Thomas Brittlebank (1838–1877), was recorded in the 1871 England Census as having moved away from the traditional family village of Winster to a small seaside village, Hornsea, in the neighbouring county of Yorkshire. He was accompanied by his wife Ellen Sarah Leese (1837–1906), his mother-in-law Mary Leese (1805–1877), and three sons: Lewis Oswald (1861–1877), Charles Clifton (1863–1945) and Thomas Andrew (1865–1948). The head of the house was not employed – he enjoyed a private income derived from his investments.

Andrew WT Brittlebank took his wife and children overseas, spending two years in Vanuatu (known then as the Spanish East Indies, and later as the New Hebrides), before going to Brisbane, Queensland, Australia, where the passenger list of the ship Sam Mendel records their arrival on 28 July 1875

In 1876 and 1877 The Brisbane Courier frequently reported local waves of epidemics such as smallpox, malaria and influenza. In March and April 1877 Andrew WT Brittlebank and his eldest son, Lewis Oswald, both died and were buried in the South Brisbane Cemetery in Plot 11a, graves 268 and 269. Administrative procedures appear to have taken two years, for the Brisbane Telegraph reported, on Friday 14 March 1879, page 3, that "his widow Ellen S. Brittlebank was appointed guardian of the persons and the estates of Charles Clifton Brittlebank and Thomas Andrew Brittlebank".

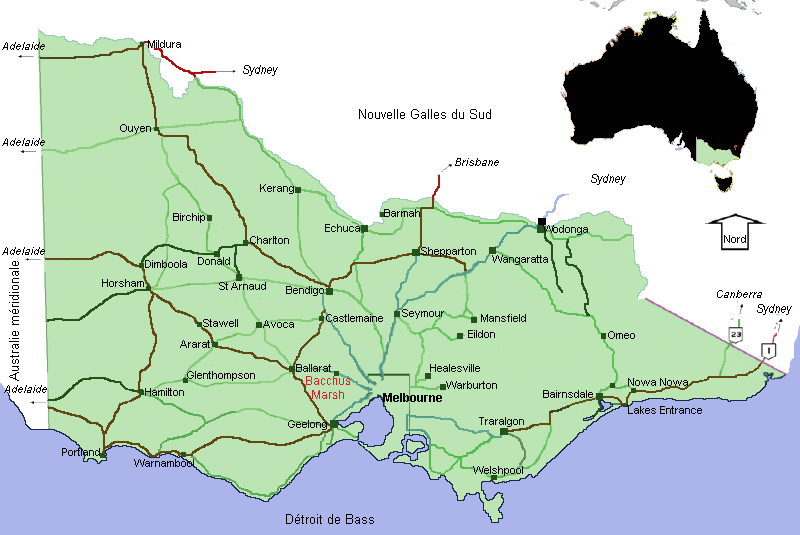
Myrniong is near Bacchus Marsh in central Victoria, Australia

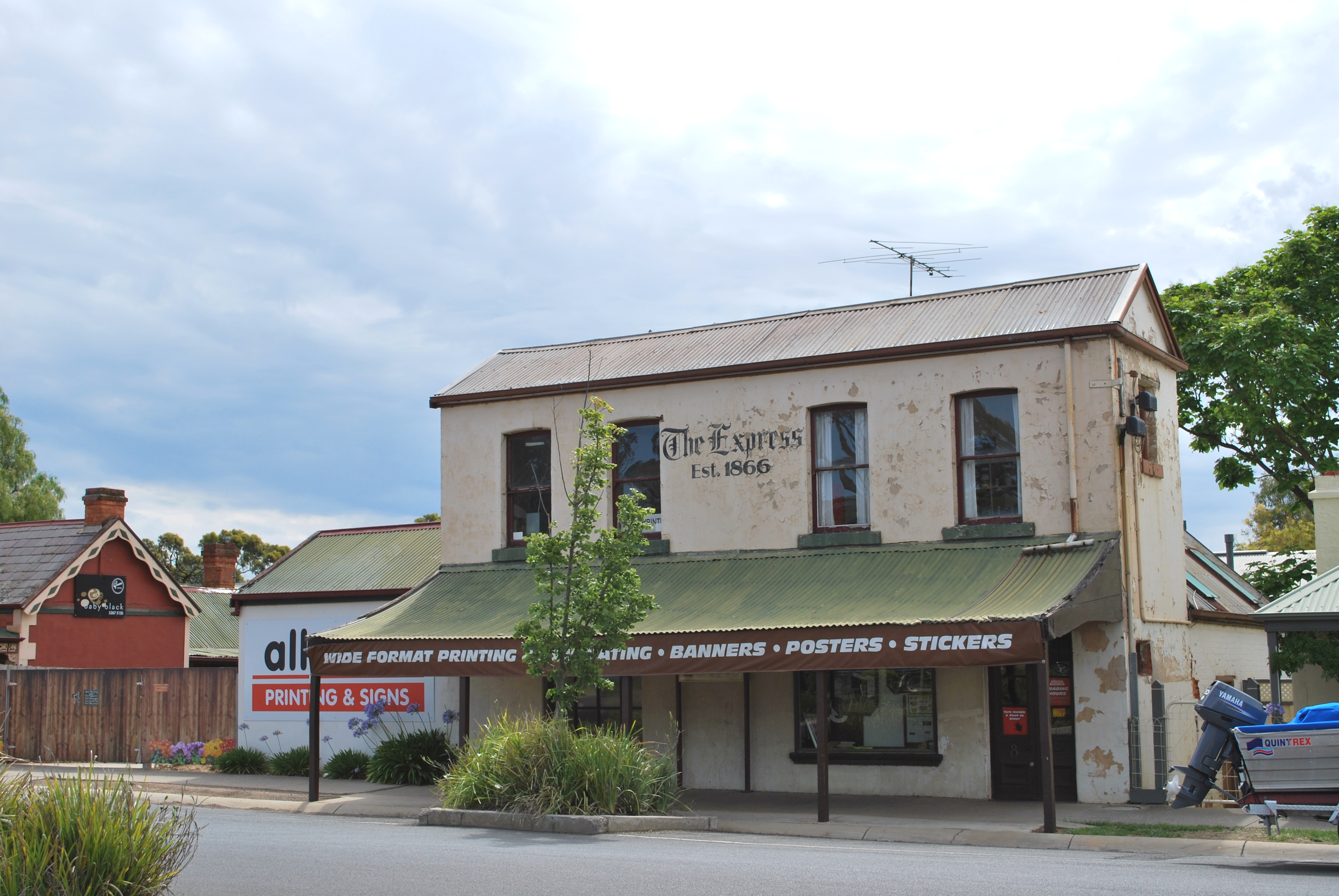
1866, The office of the Bacchus Marsh Express

The family then went south to the island of Tasmania. However, they did not remain in Tasmania, but returned to the mainland and finally put down roots in Myrniong, near Bacchus Marsh, in the state of Victoria. The Bacchus Marsh Express, 28 November 1885, page 2, announced that a mixed farm of 363 acres (approximately 150 hectares) was up for lease, after the death of the owner, William Dunbar in July 1884. It appears that the Brittlebanks took the lease, because the Bacchus Marsh Express reported in 1888 that the two brothers were the owners:

The Messrs. Brittlebank, the present owners of Dunbar's farm, have done excellent work, and have almost entirely eradicated the rabbits from their property. They have also erected a quantity of wire net fence. – Bacchus Marsh Express, 17 Nov 1888, p.3.

Throughout their lives, the work of the brothers Charles and Thomas, whether joint or individual, contributed significantly to the dissemination of new knowledge of Australian plants, animals and geology. The Victorian Naturalist summarized their contribution as follows:

They compiled one of the first comprehensive bird lists for the area [the Werribee Gorge]. Charles was a renowned artist and contributed illustrations of birds and their eggs, insects, fungi and mistletoes for pioneering works on those subjects by AJ Cambpell, JA Leach, Charles French, Daniel McAlpine and himself. He published widely and was considered an authority on the evidence for glacial action in Werribee Gorge. Thomas was a skilled egg collector, bird observer, landscape artist and contributor to his brother's and AJ Campbell's studies. Together they helped to lay the foundations of natural history study in Victoria. – Marilyn Hewish, Victorian Naturalist, Oct 2006, pp.314-317.

The brothers remained at Myrniong until 1910 after which the Australian Electoral Rolls show that Charles and family moved to Caulfield near Melbourne, whilst Thomas took up a position as the manager of the Agricultural High School Farm, in Sale, Gippsland and, later, the Agricultural High School Farm in Warrnambool.

== Marriage and children ==
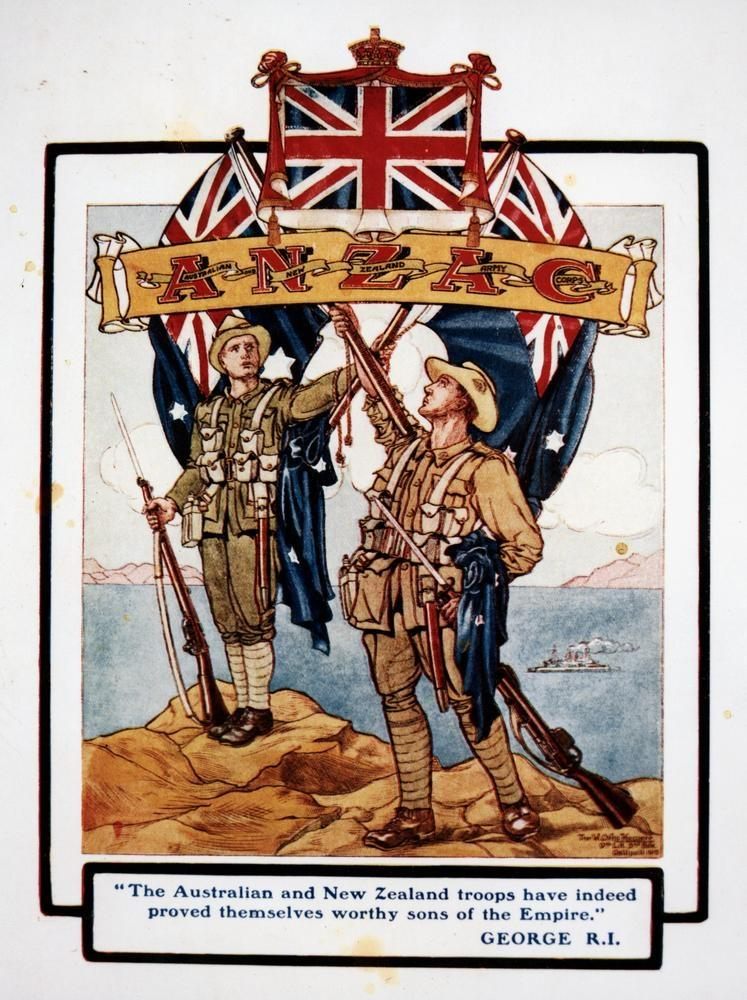
Illustration of Anzac troops after the fighting at Gallipoli in World War I, from the collection of the National Archives of Australia

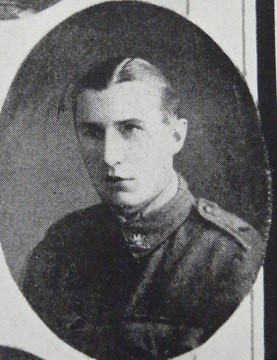
Cyril Clifton Brittlebank in 1915. Photo courtesy RSL Virtual War Memorial

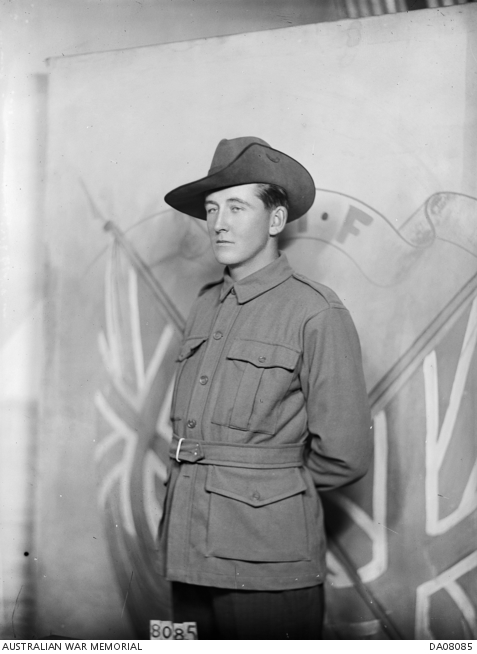
Andrew Buxton Brittlebank in 1915, from the collection of the National Archives of Australia

Charles Clifton Brittlebank and Sarah Jane Palmer (1861–1935) were married on 1 August 1894, in St Matthew's Church in Kensington, Victoria.

They had only one child, Cyril Clifton, born in Myrniong in 1895. When World War I occurred he enlisted in Australian 13th Light Horse Regiment in May 1915. After fighting at Gallipoli and on many of the battlefields on the Western Front, and having survived typhoid and various wounds, he died of influenza on 25 May 1918. He was buried in Etretat Cemetery, Le Havre, Haute-Normandie, France. His grave is listed on the Etretat Churchyard Extension web site .

A couple of months before the wedding of Charles and Sarah, Brittlebank's brother Thomas Andrew had married Marion Margaret Myers (1869–1932), on 10 June 1894. They had three children.

Their eldest son, Andrew Buxton Brittlebank, was born 10 February 1895. Like his cousin Cyril, he enlisted in 1915, as reported in the Melton Express on 19 June 1915, page 3. He became a corporal in Australian 59th Battalion, was repeatedly wounded, and died of pneumonia on 15 Oct 1917. He was buried in Aeroplane Cemetery, Ypres, Flanders, Belgium, and is listed on the cemetery's web site .

As described on the history page of the Shrine's web site , the Shrine of Remembrance in Melbourne, Victoria, was originally erected to commemorate the 19,000 Victorian victims of World War I who, like the Brittlebank cousins, were buried overseas, leaving their Australian families without graves at which to mourn.

The name Buxton was the maiden name of Andrew William Thomas Brittlebank's maternal grandmother, Margaret Buxton (1779–1820) who lived in Thorpe, Derbyshire, England. Furthermore, Buxton was also the name of one of the most important towns in the Peak District of Derbyshire. Thus the name may have held sentimental value for the expatriate Thomas Andrew Brittlebank who had been brought to Australia as a child. He and his wife Marion gave each of their children the middle name of Buxton: Andrew (1895–1917), Olive (1897–1984) and Tom (1899–1966).

== Career ==
The value of Charles Clifton Brittlebank's work can be appreciated from the excitement generated by the announcement of a discovery reported on 29 September 2013, on The Age web site :

Researchers have found "the holy grail of entomology" – a long-lost guide to Victoria's insects written by pioneer researcher Charles French. The handwritten manuscript, beautifully illustrated with artwork by Charles Brittlebank and LC Vald Anderson, describes the state's bug life before insecticides were used. – Bridie Smith, The Age, 29 September 2013.

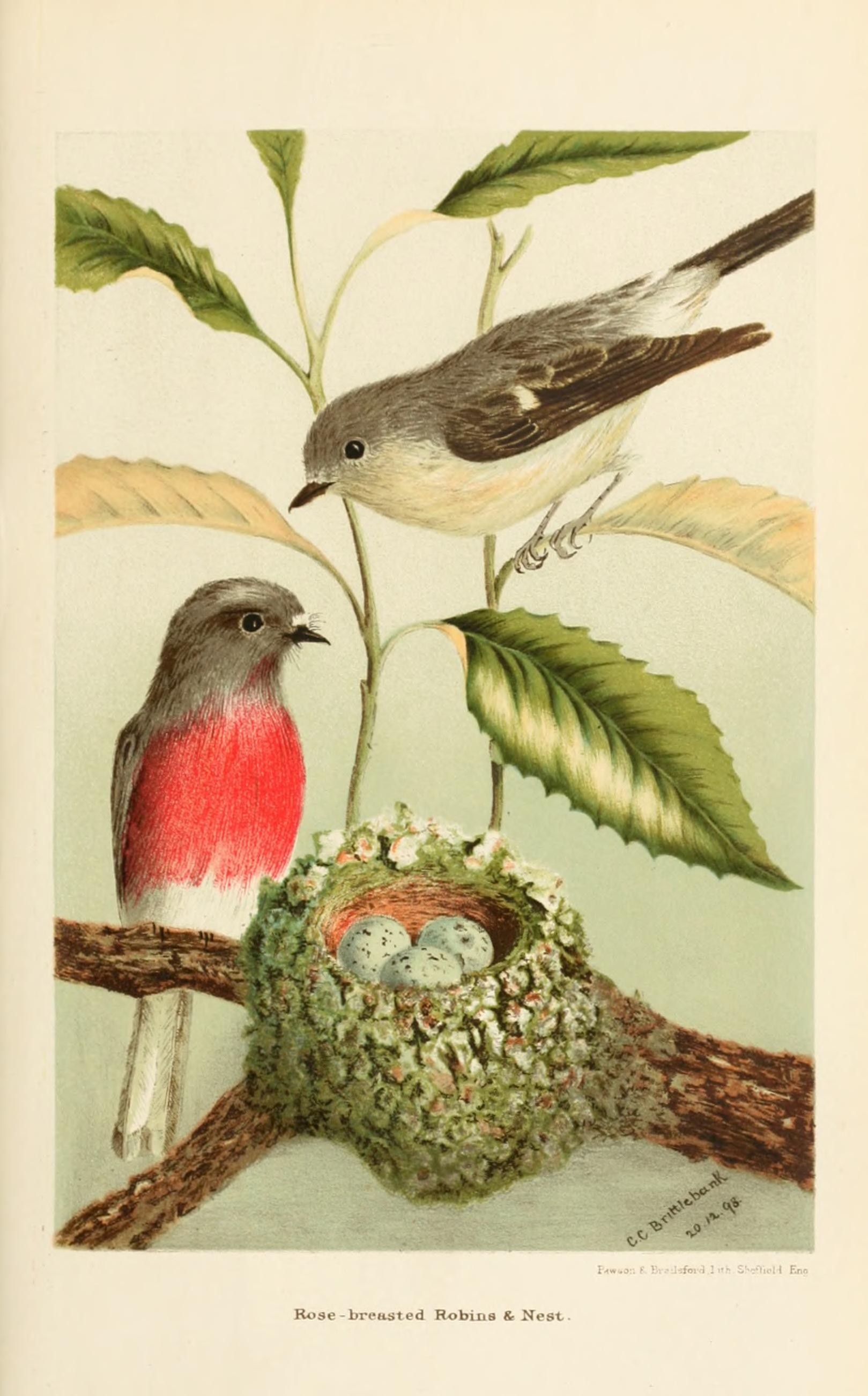
Rose-breasted Robin, by CC Brittlebank, 1896, for Nests and eggs of Australian birds by AJ Campbell, printed in 1900

Recognition for his many and varied accomplishments in the field of natural history came to Brittlebank long before his official appointment as Government Plant Pathologist. Some of the significant milestones of his scientific life include the following:

- 1894: Brittlebank discovered the first evidences of Ice Age glaciation in the Werribee Gorge. In collaboration with Professor Sir Edgeworth David and Mr George Sweet, he published many scientific papers on the Gorge, making it a famous Australian locality for the study of glacial geology.
- 1896: the founding meeting of the Australasian Ornithologists’ Union was held at Britannia House, South Yarra, Melbourne, Victoria, on 15 August. Both Charles and his brother Thomas Brittlebank were present with 18 other naturalists, including Archibald James Campbell.
- 1900: publication of Brittlebank's illustrations in Charles French's A Handbook of the Destructive Insects of Victoria published 1891–1900; and Archibald James Campbell's Nests and Eggs of Australian Birds, published 1900.
- 1908: appointed as assistant to the highly acclaimed Australian Government botanist Daniel McAlpine (1849–1932).
- 1913–1924: appointed as plant pathologist, Victorian Department of Agriculture. During this time he published more than two dozen scholarly papers, and set up a diagnostic and consultative service for the primary producers of Victoria.
- 1923–1928: lectured on fungus diseases of fruit, at the Burnley School of Horticulture, and on plant pathology, at the School of Agriculture, University of Melbourne.
- 1924–1928: appointed as Biologist-in-Charge of the Science Branch, Australian Department of Agriculture.
- 1928: officially retired from full-time paid employment
- 1928–1945 continued to conduct research and participate in the science of natural history; prepared an 11-part manuscript of a Catalogue of Australian Fungi, which is held by CSIRO Black Mountain Library. He also completed an Index of Australian fungi and fungus diseases, commissioned by the Council for Scientific and Industrial Research and circulated in manuscript to a select number of people.

== Final years ==
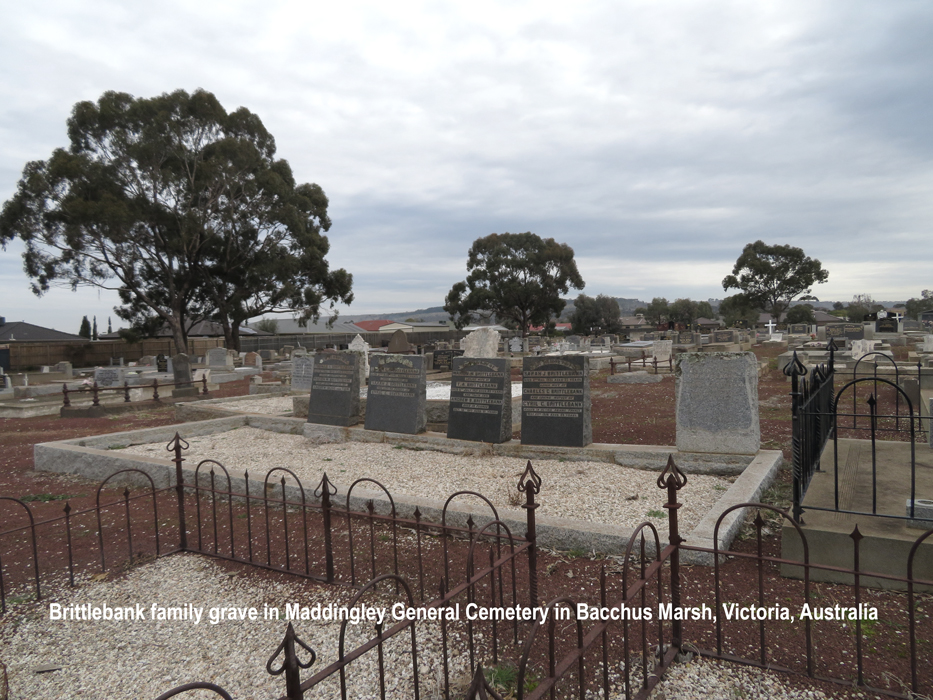
Brittlebank family grave, in Maddingley General Cemetery, Bacchus Marsh, Victoria, Australia

Charles Brittlebank's brother Thomas lost his wife, Marion, in July 1932, and Charles himself became widowed in 1935 when Sarah died. After that time the brothers both lived at No. 48 York Street, Caulfield, near Melbourne.

Charles pre-deceased his younger brother by three years, dying in 1945, aged 83. He is buried in the family grave in the Maddingley Central Cemetery, in Bacchus Marsh, Victoria. The cemetery has been in use since the 1860s. The Brittlebank grave also holds four other relatives of Charles, as follows:

- Ellen Sarah (née Leese), died 1906 aged 69, mother
- Marion Margaret (née Myers), died 1931 aged 63, sister in law
- Sarah Jane (née Palmer), died 1935 aged 73, wife
- Charles Clifton, died 1945 aged 83
- Thomas Andrew, died 1948 aged 83, brother

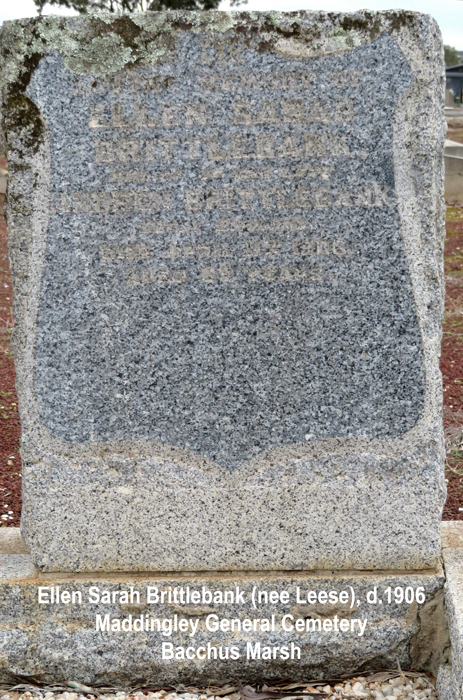
Ellen Sarah Brittlebank

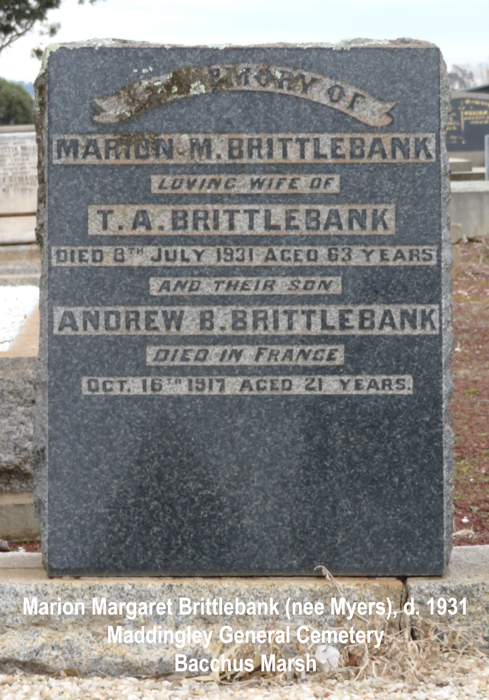
Marion Margaret Brittlebank

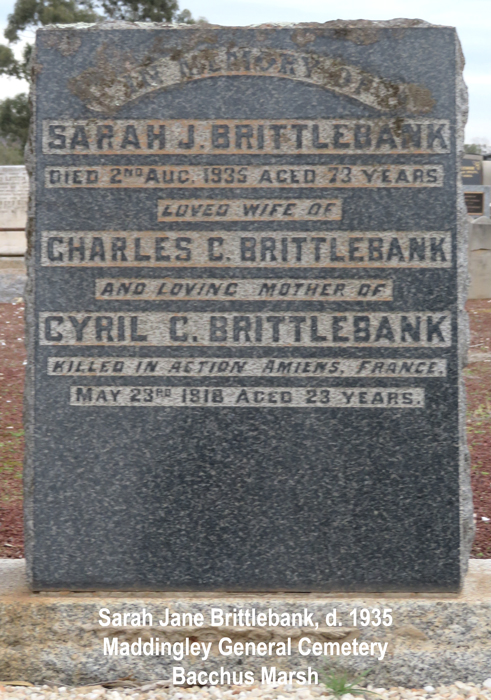
Sarah Jane Brittlebank

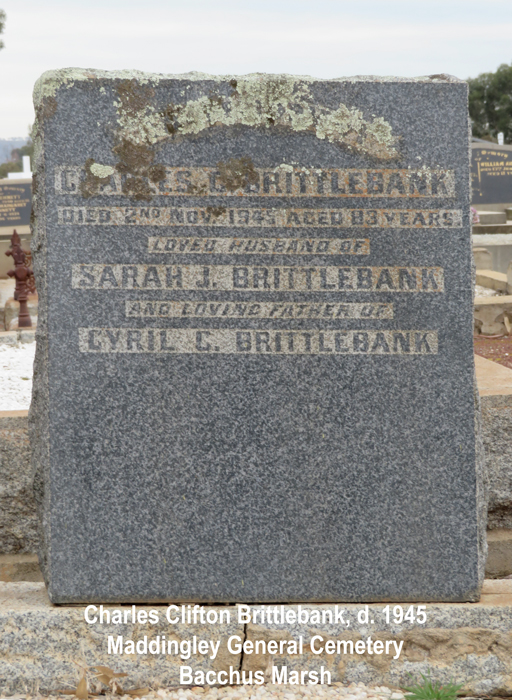
Charles Clifton Brittlebank

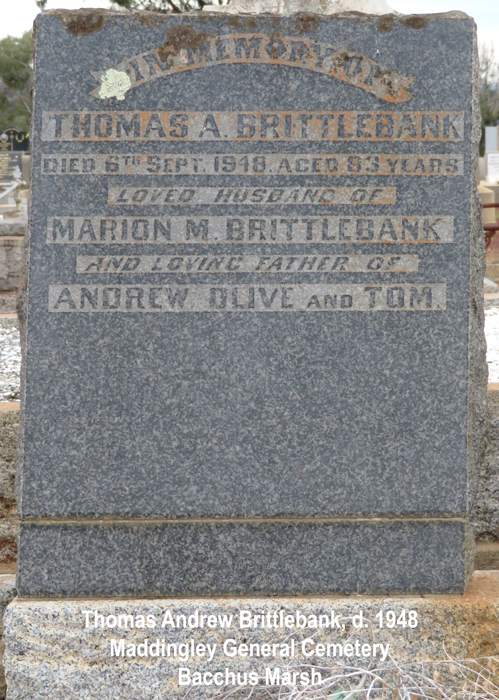
Thomas Andrew Brittlebank

Obituaries

An insight into his character is found in the tribute to him from his colleague and successor Stanislaus Fish:

I worked with him for 3 years before he retired as a plant pathologist, [he was also an] artist, naturalist, successful farmer, professional boxer, and no mean golfer – an unforgettable character. – S. Fish, Annual Revue of Phytopathology, 1970.

Regret at the loss of a good friend, and appreciation for his contribution to science are also evident in other obituaries, such as that in Wild Life and in the Victorian Naturalist:

he had not only left his mark upon Victorian natural history as a leading authority on fungi, but he had wide natural history interests, and was such a fine scientific draughtsman and water colorist that his services were always in demand when accurate, delicate and tasteful scientific illustrations were required. – C. Morrison, Wild Life, 1945.

As a token of appreciation for his friend, the senior C. French, first Government Entomologist and founder of this [Field Naturalists’] Club, Brittlebank prepared a large series of water-colour drawings featuring every beetle that had been scientifically named after French. These framed drawings, which cover seven large sheets of drawing paper, came into the possession of C. French junior, who had succeeded his father as Entomologist, and who later succeeded his friend Brittlebank as [Government] Biologist. Mr French recently presented these beautiful illustrations to the National Museum where they will be exhibited as a permanent memorial to both men. – EE Prescott, Victorian Naturalist, 1946.

== Bibliography – works by Charles Clifton Brittlebank ==
A sample of the scholarly works by CC Brittlebank (solo and in collaboration) includes the following, listed chronologically by date of publication:

- Brittlebank, CC 1888, "Food of planarians", Victorian Naturalist, vol. 5, p. 48.
- Sweet, G and Brittlebank, CC 1893, "The glacial deposits of the Bacchus Marsh district", Report of the Australian Association for the Advancement of Science, vol. 5, pp. 376–389.
- French, C 1893, A handbook of the destructive insects of Victoria: with notes on the methods to be adopted to check and extirpate them, Government Printer, South Africa. [Includes artwork by Charles Brittlebank and LC Vald Anderson].
- Brittlebank, CC 1897, "Red rain", Victorian Naturalist, vol. 13, p. 125.
- Brittlebank, CC, Sweet, G and David, TWE 1898, "Further Evidence as to the Glacial Action in the Bacchus Marsh District, Victoria", Report of the Seventh Meeting of the Australasian Association for the Advancement of Science, vol. 7, pp. 361–365.
- Brittlebank, CC 1899, "Birds of Myrniong and surrounding district", Victorian Naturalist, vol. 16, pp. 59–61.
- Campbell, AJ 1900, Nest and eggs of Australian birds, including the geographical distribution of the species and popular observations thereon: with map, 28 coloured plates and 131 photographic illustrations, Pawson and Brailsford for the author, Sheffield, England. [Includes artwork by Charles Brittlebank].
- Brittlebank, CC 1900, "The Rate of Erosion of some River Valleys", Geological Magazine, vol. 7, no. 7, pp. 320–322.
- Brittlebank, CC 1903, "Potato diseases – the danger of importation", Journal of the Department of Agriculture, Victoria, 2, 400403.
- Kohlschütter, V and Brittlebank, C 1906, "Ueber Thioharnstoffcuprosalze", European Journal of Organic Chemistry, vol. 349, no. 2, pp. 232–268.
- Brittlebank, CC 1908, "The life-history of Loranthus exocarpi", Proceedings of the Linnean Society of New South Wales, vol. 33, pp. 650–656.
- Brittlebank, CC 1913, "The effect of formalin and copper sulphate solution on the germination of wheat", Journal of the Department of Agriculture, Victoria, vol. 11, pp. 473–476.
- De Castella, F. and Brittlebank, CC 1917, "Notes on downy mildew (Plasmopara viticola, B. and de T.)", Journal of Agriculture Victoria, vol. 15, pp. 685–700.
- De Castella, F. and Brittlebank, CC 1917, "Anthracnose, or Black Spot of the Vine", Bulletin of the Department of Agriculture, Victoria, no. 42.
- Brittlebank, CC 1919, "Diseases of plants new to Victoria", Journal of Agriculture Victoria, vol. 17, pp. 626–627.
- Brittlebank, CC 1919, "Green manurial crops and "take-all", Journal of the Agricultural Department Victoria, vol. 19, p. 171.
- Brittlebank, CC 1919, "Tomato disease", Journal of the Department of Agriculture Victoria, vol. 17, pp. 1348–1352.
- Brittlebank, CC 1920, "Flag smut", Journal of the Department of Agriculture Victoria, vol. 18, no. 4, pp. 240–243.
- Brittlebank, CC 1921, "Seed-borne diseases: take-all and flag smut", Journal of the Department of Agriculture Victoria, vol. 19, no. 7, p. 447.
- De Castella, F. and Brittlebank, CC, "Oidium of the vine", Journal of the Department of Agriculture of Victoria, November/December 1923, and February 1924.
- Brittlebank, C.C. and Adam, D.B., 1924, "A new disease of the Gramineae: Pleosphaeria semeniperda nov. sp.", Transactions of the British Mycological Society, vol. 10, no. 1–2, pp. 123-IN9.
- Brittlebank, C.C. and Fish, S., 1927, "A garden fungus disease: A wilt of tomatoes, Iceland poppies, and other garden plants in Victoria caused by the fungus Phytophthora cryptogea (Pethyb. & Lafferty)", Journal of Agriculture, Victorian Department of Agriculture, vol. 25, pp. 380–381.

== See also ==
- The Field Naturalists Club of Victoria, Australia
- Werribee Gorge State Park, Victoria, Australia
- Official website of the Peak District National Park Authority, Derbyshire, England
