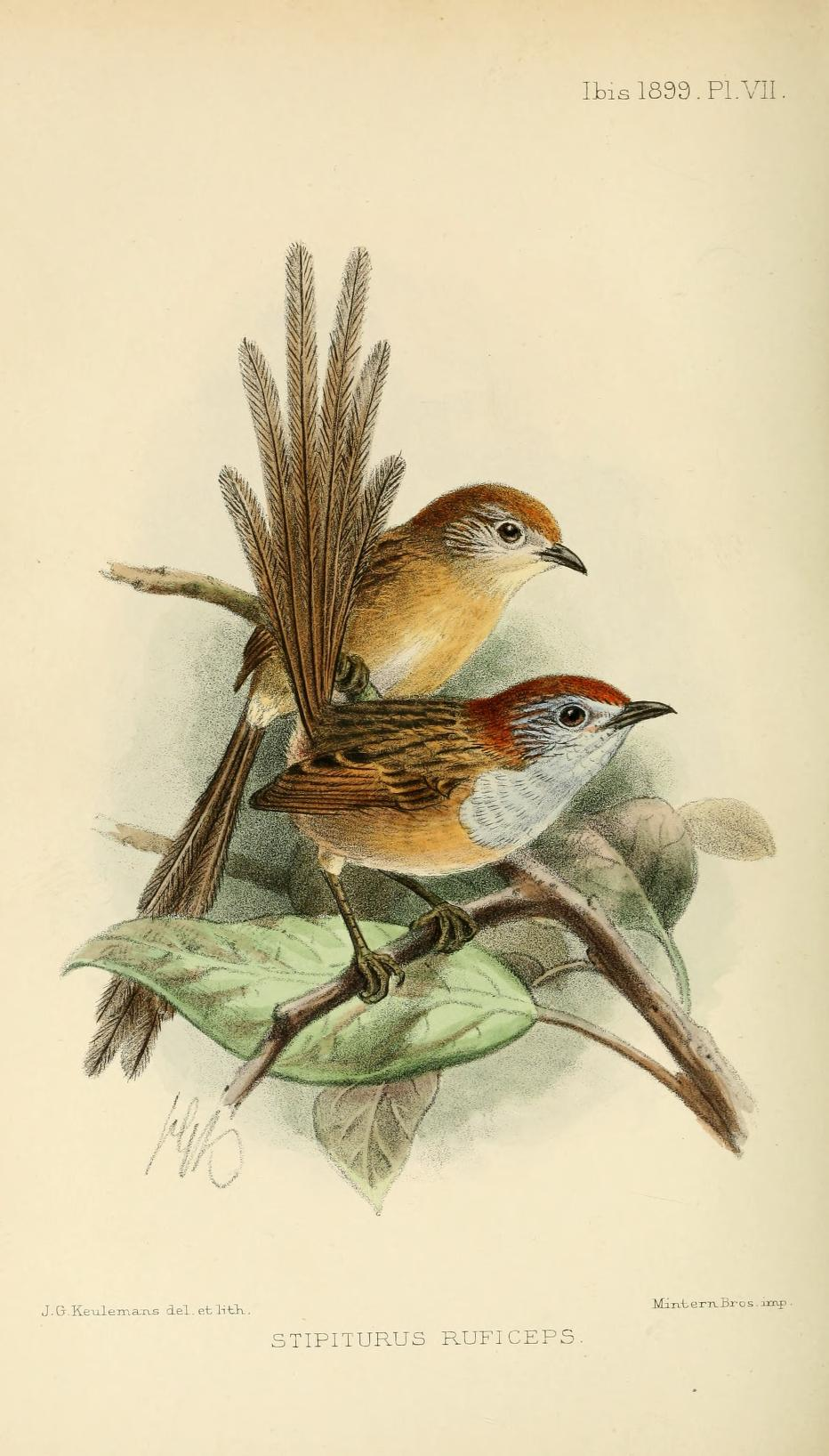

Scientific classification
- Kingdom: Animalia
- Phylum: Chordata
- Class: Aves
- Order: Passeriformes
- Family: Maluridae
- Genus: Stipiturus; Lesson, 1831

Type species
- Muscicapa malachura Shaw, 1798

Species
- S. malachurus; S. mallee; S. ruficeps

= Emu-wren =

Emu-wrens

Genus of birds

The emu-wrens (Stipiturus) are a genus of passerine birds in the Australasian wren family, Maluridae. They are found only in Australia, where they inhabit scrub, heathland and grassland. They are small birds, 12–19 cm long with the tail accounting for over half of their length. The tail has only six feathers which are loose and coarse in structure, rather like the feathers of the emu. Three species are recognised, of which the mallee emu-wren is endangered.

== Taxonomy and systematics ==
The common name of the genus is derived from the resemblance of their tails to the feathers of an emu. The genus was defined by French naturalist René Lesson in 1831 after his visit to Port Jackson on the 1823-5 voyage of the Coquille, although the southern emu-wren had already been encountered and described soon after European settlement at Sydney Cove. The three species have been variously considered as one, two or even four species (as the Western Australian subspecies westernensis of the southern emu-wren also considered a species at one point. Their closest relative, based on allozyme studies, appears to be the orange-crowned fairywren of the monotypic genus Clytomyias from the mountains of New Guinea.

=== Species ===
There are three recognised species in the genus:

Image	Scientific name	Common name	Distribution
	Stipiturus malachurus	Southern emu-wren	Coastal south-eastern and south-western Australia.
	Stipiturus mallee	Mallee emu-wren	Mallee country of north-western Victoria and south-eastern South Australia.
	Stipiturus ruficeps	Rufous-crowned emu-wren	Arid interior of central-northern Australia.

Ornithologist Richard Schodde has proposed that the southern emu-wren is the ancestral form from which the other two species have evolved.

== Description ==
Emu-wrens exhibit sexual dimorphism, the males have brownish plumage with rufous crowns of varying intensity, and a sky blue throat and upper chest. The females lack the blue coloration and are predominantly reddish brown above and paler below. Their most distinctive feature is their long tails, composed of six filamentous feathers, the central two longer again. The tail is double the body length in the case of the southern and rufous-crowned species. They weigh from 5.4 g in the case of the smallest, the rufous-crowned, to 7.5 g of the southern emu-wren.

== Distribution and habitat ==
The three species of emu-wrens each live in distinct habitats: the southern emu-wren preferring marshes and heathland, the mallee emu-wren inhabiting spinifex understory in mallee woodland, and the rufous-crowned emu-wren dwelling in spinifex in desert areas.

== Behaviour and ecology ==
Emu-wrens are fairly secretive and hard to spot, living in low shrub cover. They are predominantly insectivorous, but supplement their diet with seeds. Their furtive behaviour and brown colour has resulted in them being mistaken for bush mice. They exhibit a weak but distinctive flight pattern with the tail feathers drooping noticeably.
