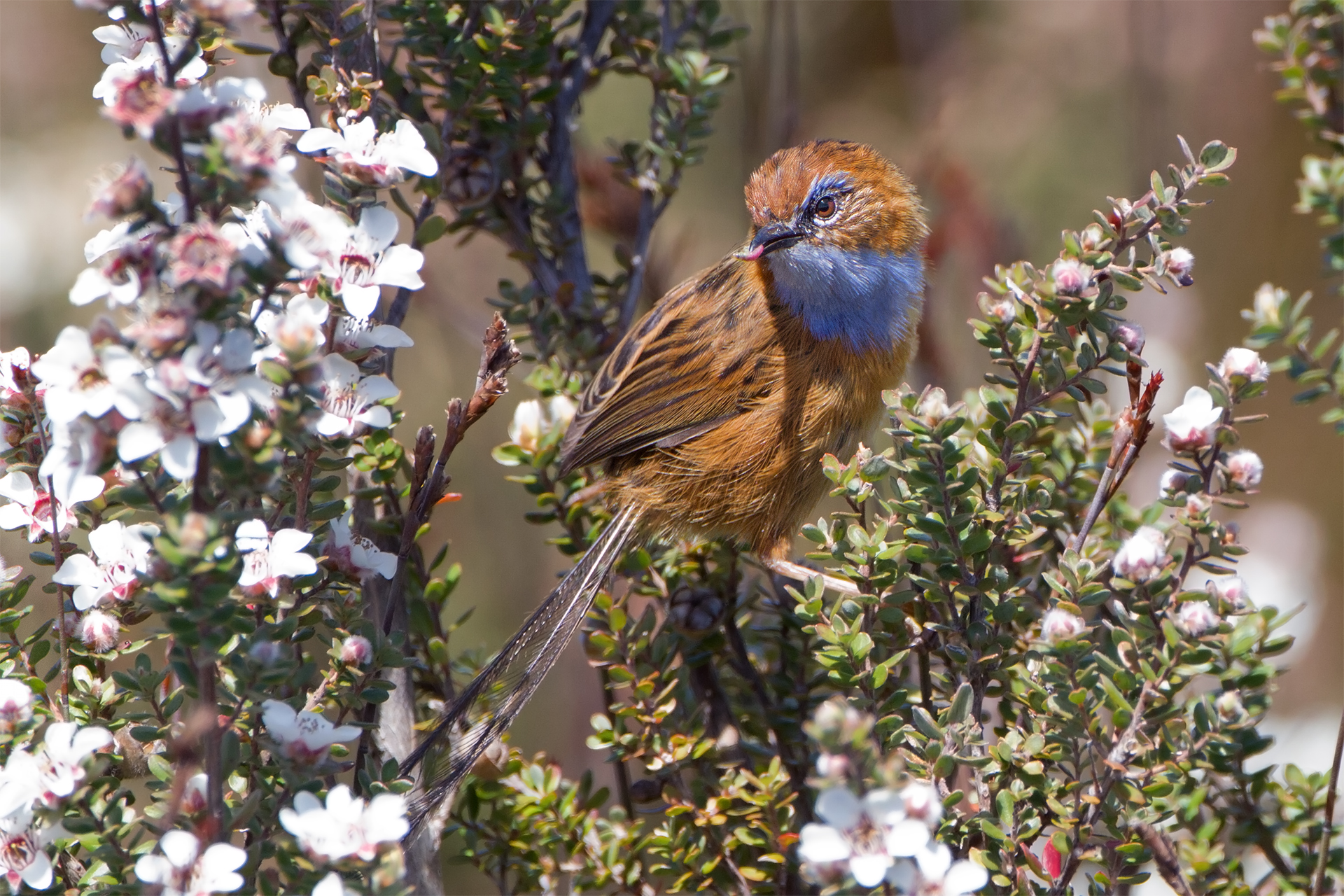
- Male in Tasmania

Conservation status
- Least Concern (IUCN 3.1)

Scientific classification
- Kingdom: Animalia
- Phylum: Chordata
- Class: Aves
- Order: Passeriformes
- Family: Maluridae
- Genus: Stipiturus
- Species: S. malachurus

Binomial name
- Stipiturus malachurus (Shaw, 1798)
- Distribution map

Synonyms
- Muscicapa malachura Shaw; Malurus palustris Vieillot

= Southern emu-wren =

Species of bird

The southern emu-wren (Stipiturus malachurus) is a species of bird in the Australasian wren family, Maluridae. It is endemic to Australia. Its natural habitats are temperate forests, and Mediterranean-type shrubby vegetation, and swamplands.

== Description ==
The adult male has rusty-brown upper parts with streaks of black, the crown more reddish and grey-brown wings. It has a sky-blue throat, upper chest and eyebrow. The tail is double the body length, and is composed of six filamentous feathers, the central two of which are longer than the lateral ones. The underparts are pale red-brown, paler on the belly. The bill is black and the feet and eyes are brown. The female is darker streaked and lacks the blue plumage and redder crown. Its bill is brown with a pale grey base.

== Distribution and habitat ==
Throughout its range, the southern emu-wren inhabits marshes, low heathland and dune areas.

At least one subspecies is present near the site of the Whalers Way Orbital Launch Complex near Port Lincoln, on the Eyre Peninsula of South Australia.

== Taxonomy and systematics ==
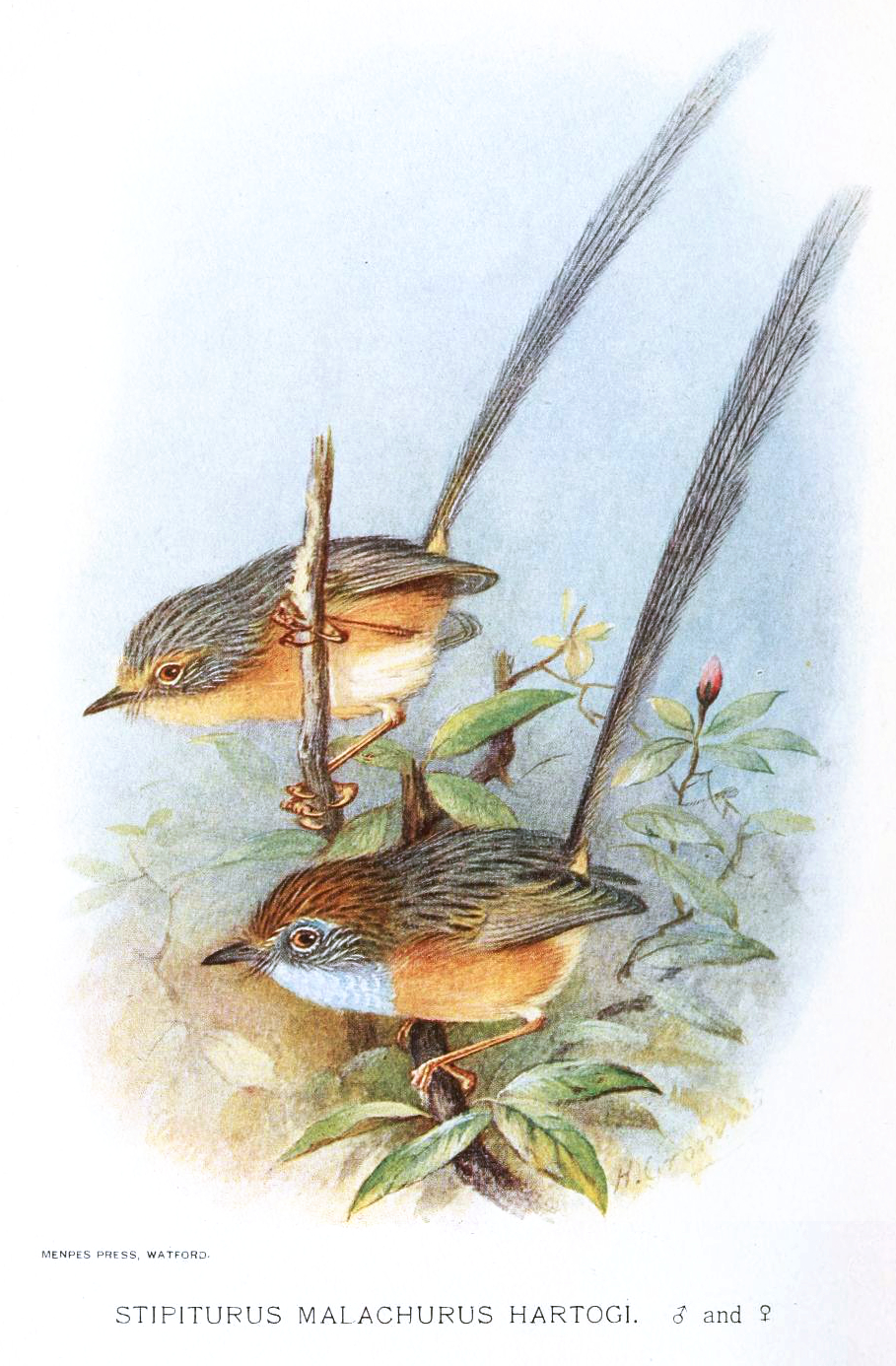
Stipiturus malachurus hartogi: male (foreground) and female

The southern emu-wren is one of three species of the genus Stipiturus, commonly known as emu-wrens, found across southern and central Australia. It was first characterized by naturalist George Shaw in 1798 as Muscicapa malachura, after being collected in the Port Jackson (Sydney) district. It was described as the "soft-tailed flycatcher", native name mur-re-a-nera when painted between 1788 and 1797 by Thomas Watling, one of a group known collectively as the Port Jackson Painter. Another painting in the same series yielded the indigenous name mereangeree. Notes on this latter drawing suggest an alternative name of emu- or cassowary titmouse, from its soft tail feathers. In the first description and illustration of the bird by Major-General Thomas Davies, another Sydney region indigenous name merion binnion was reported, since the tail resembled the "cassowary (emu)" feathers.

The skin of a male southern emu-wren somehow ended up in the collection of Coenraad Jacob Temminck, who believed it to be from Java. From there it was named by François Levaillant as the gauze-tailed warbler. This mistake was not picked up for another 55 years. Vieillot defined the genus Malurus and placed the southern emu-wren within it, naming it as Malurus palustris.

The southern emu-wren derives its common name from its tail feathers, the loosely barbed nature of which resembles feathers of the emu, the irony being that the emu-wrens are among the smallest of Australian birds, while the emu is the largest.

=== Subspecies ===
Up to eleven subspecies have been described, with eight recognised as of 2022:

- S. m. malachurus - (Shaw, 1798): The nominate subspecies is found along the eastern coastline from Noosa Heads in Queensland south through New South Wales and Victoria and to the mouth of the Murray River in south-eastern South Australia. It remains east and south of the Great Dividing Range.
- S. m. littleri - (Mathews, 1912): Found across Tasmania.
- S. m. polionotum - (Schodde & Ian J. Mason, 1999): Found in south-central and south-eastern Australia
- S. m. intermedius - (Ashby, 1920): It is a darker-plumaged race, confined to the southern Mount Lofty Ranges region of the Fleurieu Peninsula in South Australia. Commonly known as the Mount Lofty Ranges Southern Emu-wren (MLSREW), it is an endangered species under both the EPBC Act (Cwth) and the National Parks and Wildlife Act 1972 (SA). Its largest population inhabits the swamplands of the lower Finniss River, estimated to be 52–100 individuals, while fewer than 50 have been observed in Deep Creek Conservation Park. It is dependent upon swamps for its continued existence, but there was significant loss of habitat from 1993 until 2012. There has been a conservation strategy in place since 1994. In 2015 Nature Foundation opened Watchalunga Nature Reserve to help protect the species.
- S. m. halmaturinus - (Parsons, 1920): Found on Kangaroo Island. It is the largest race.
- S. m. parimeda - (Schodde & Weatherly, 1981): Found on the southern tip of the Eyre Peninsula. This subspecies is distinguishable from others by its significantly paler plumage.
- S. m. westernensis - (Campbell, AJ, 1912): Originally described as a separate species. Found in south-western Western Australia.
- S. m. hartogi - (Carter, 1916): It is restricted to Dirk Hartog Island.
