= Archibald James Campbell =

Australian civil servant, ornithologist, and photographer. (1853–1929)

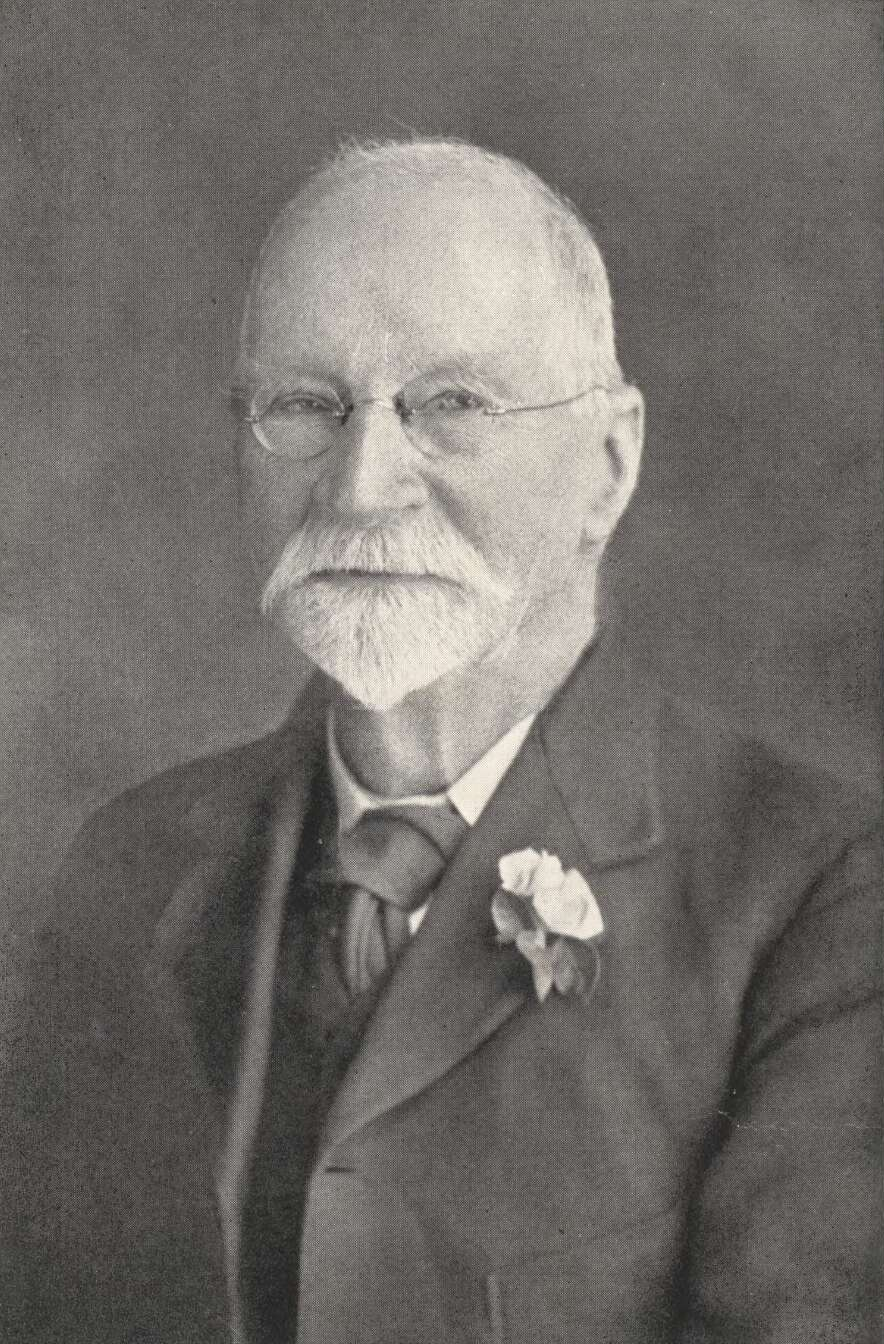
Archibald James Campbell

Archibald James Campbell (18 February 1853 – 11 September 1929) was an Australian civil servant in the Victorian (later Australian) government Customs Service. However, his international reputation rests on his expertise as an amateur ornithologist, naturalist, and photographer.

He was one of the principal founders of the Royal Australasian Ornithologists Union (RAOU) in 1901, and served as its president in 1909 and 1928. He was also a founder member of the Victorian Wattle Club in 1899 and the Bird Observers Club in 1905. Campbell was active in the Field Naturalists Club of Victoria from its inception in 1880, leading pioneering expeditions and writing for their journal. He wrote the classic field guide to oology (a branch of ornithology) in Australia: Nests and Eggs of Australian Birds, published in 1901.

== Early life ==
Campbell (the ornithologist) shared his personal names, Archibald James, with his father, so to avoid confusion the ornithologist will be referred to throughout this article as "Campbell", whilst his father will be named in full.

Campbell's parents were Scottish, Archibald James Campbell (1817–1872) and his wife Catherine (née Pinkerton) (1833–1882) both having been born in the Gorbals area of Glasgow. Travelling alone, the 22 year-old Archibald James Campbell sailed from Liverpool aboard the barque Statesman on 4 February 1840, disembarking in Melbourne on 21 June. He obtained employment in the Victorian Education Department, but moved to the rural Werribee River region in 1851 at a time when it was beginning to be exploited for agricultural and pastoral purposes.

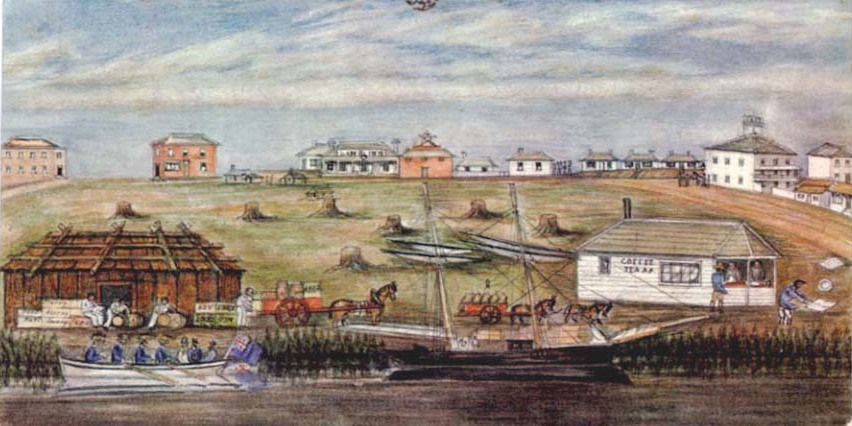
Landing at Melbourne 1840 - a watercolour by WFE Liardet, State Library of Victoria, Australia

Before that, the Pinkerton extended family of twelve people had arrived in Melbourne on the barque Superb, in December 1839. By 1852, the Australian Electoral Roll records that several members of the Pinkerton family owned large tracts of freehold land on the Werribee River, used mainly to pasture sheep for the wool trade.

In that year Archibald James Campbell married Catherine Pinkerton. The first of their children was their son, AJ Campbell, born in February 1853.

William Campbell, Campbell's uncle, married Margaret Pinkerton (1829-1920), Campbell's aunt, in 1864. Years later, Margaret Pinkerton's 90th birthday was celebrated, and was described in a lengthy article in The Argus, providing many details of life in rural Victoria in the mid-1800s. Migrant families experienced for the first time the most basic living conditions, epidemics of serious diseases (for both humans and animals), and destructive natural hazards including fire, flood and drought.

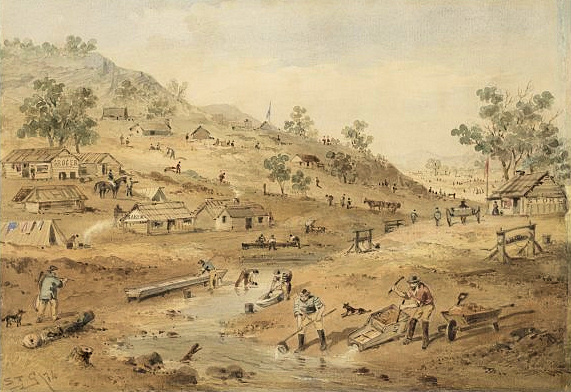
Diggings in the Mount Alexander district of Victoria in 1852, by ST Gill, National Library of Australia

Landowners were also faced with another insuperable problem - the vanishing of their farm labourers whenever news of another discovery was reported in the Australian gold rushes of the 1850s and early 1860s. In addition, the cost of living increased dramatically because of the influx of diggers, and gold soon displaced wool as Australia's chief export commodity.

Catherine and Margaret Pinkerton lost their mother, two siblings and a young cousin between 1855 and 1858, and Campbell's brother John Ecker Campbell died in 1860, aged 14 months. The head of the Pinkerton family, James, retired to Bacchus Marsh in 1862, and the Campbell family returned to Melbourne.

== Career ==
On 18 February 1896, at the age of 16, Campbell obtained full-time work in the Victorian Government Customs Service as a "Landing waiter" (although several biographical articles give his job name as "landing weigher").

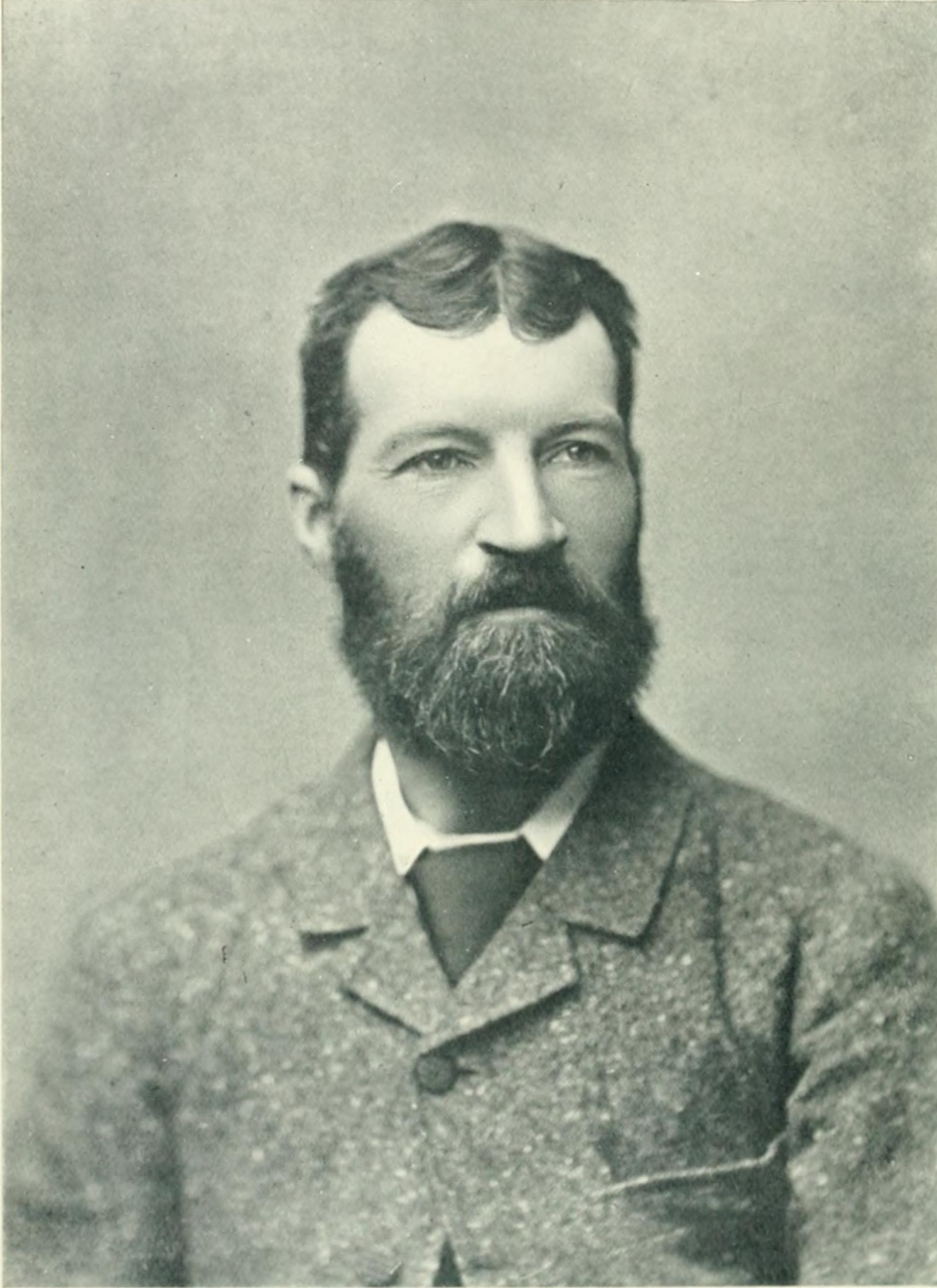
Campbell, c. 1901, by T. Ward

His next significant career step was confirmed on 12 September 1874 when his name appeared in The Argus (Melbourne) newspaper's list (page 7) of those who had passed the Civil Service Examination.

The Victorian Customs Service was amalgamated with that of the other states in 1901, at the time of Federation, creating the Department of Trade and Customs (Australia). Campbell remained with the Service throughout his working life, until his retirement in July 1914.

== Study of Australian birds ==
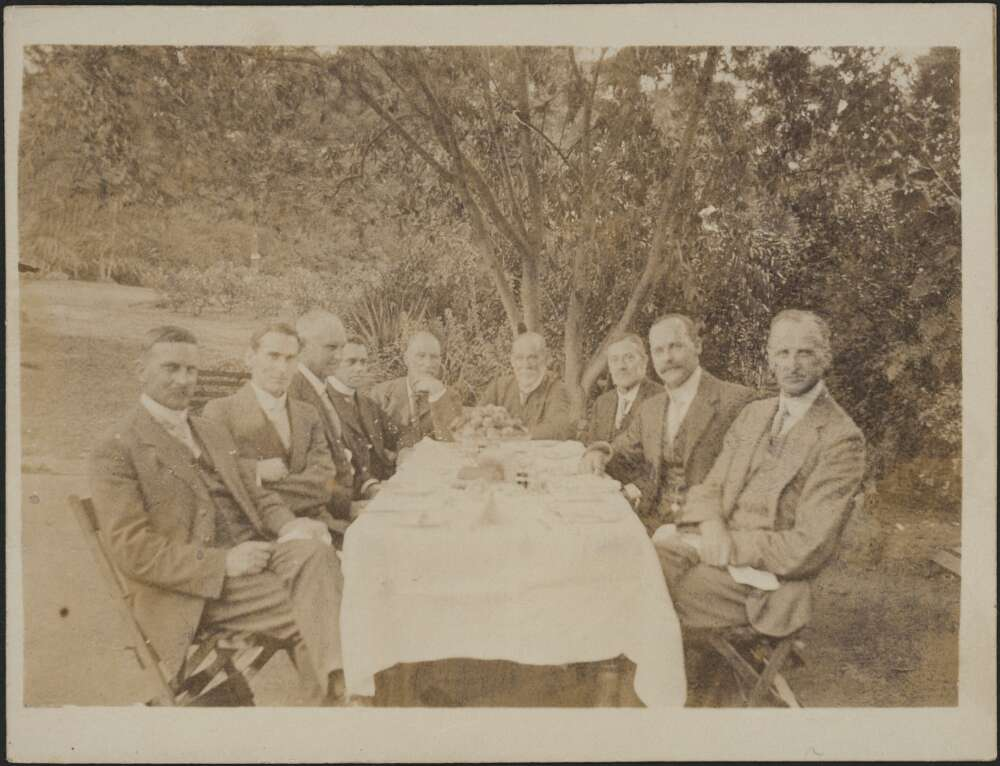
Group portrait of Dr J. Leach, L. Chandler, C. McLennan, C. Barrett, A.J. Campbell, D. Le Souef, T. Tregallas, Z. Gray, Gregory Mathews

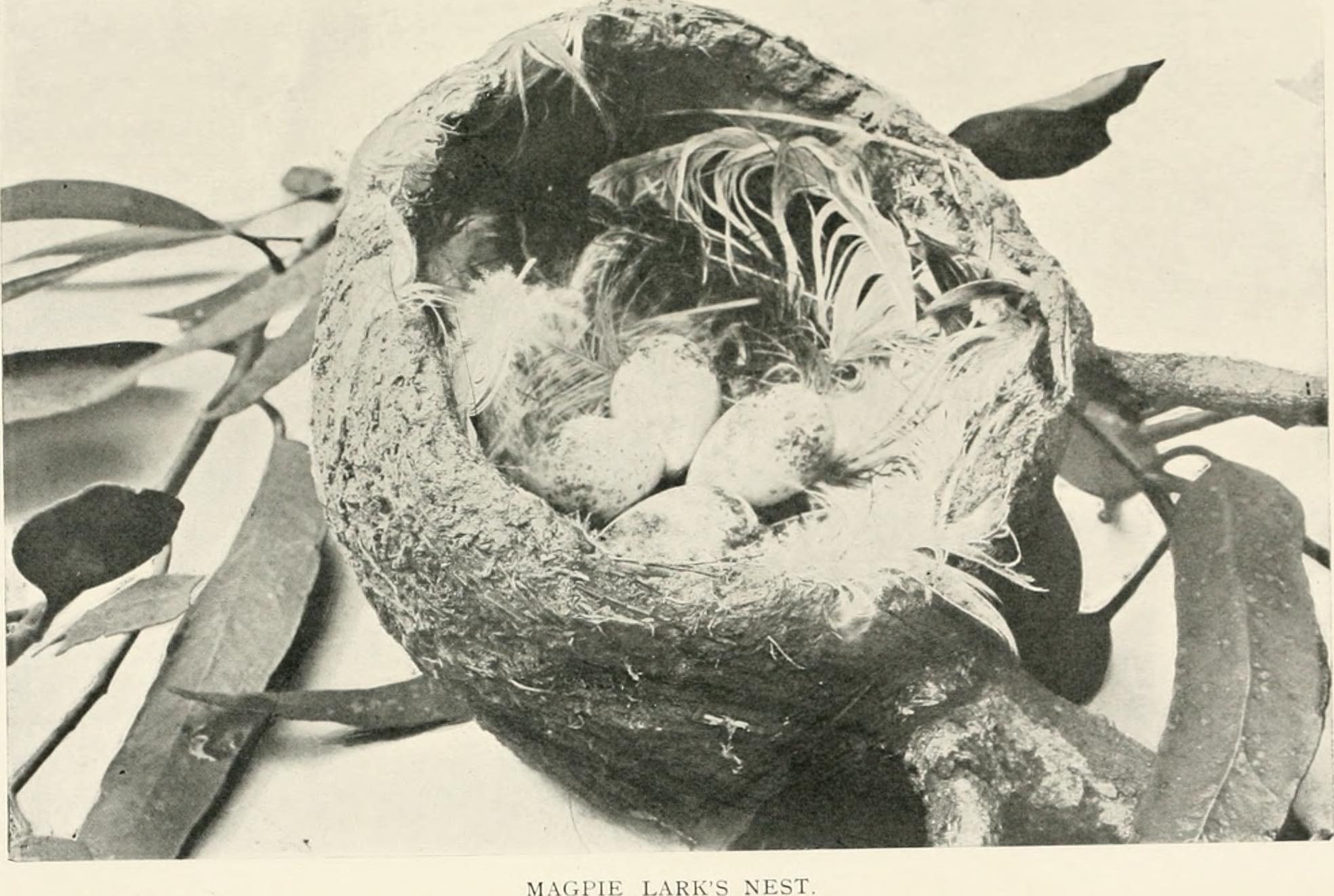
Nest and eggs of the Magpie-lark Grallina cyanoleuca, 1901, photograph by AJ Campbell

In the introduction to his presentation to the Field Naturalists Club of Victoria (FNCV) in 1883 Campbell explains that his topic, Oology (or oölogy), is a branch of ornithology that is devoted to the study of bird eggs and nests as an aid to identifying individual birds, and of learning about their movements and distribution across the country. The fact that Campbell was invited to speak at the FNCV indicates that, by the age of 30, he had become a recognised expert on Australian birds, nests and eggs.

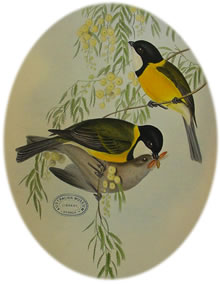
Golden Whistler Pachycephala pectoralis, in The birds of Australia, 1840–48. Artists: J. Gould and E. Gould; Lithographer: E. Gould

The FNCV was established in 1880 and is Victoria's oldest field naturalists club. Members are professional scientists, students and amateurs who study the natural world by going out into the environment. Since the establishment of the club, members have regularly arranged field trips for research, published scientific papers in their journal the Victorian Naturalist, and have taken an active and public role in promoting conservation and protection.

Campbell had close working relationships with other prominent scientists in the FNCV, amongst whom was Professor Walter Baldwin Spencer, head of the Department of Biology at Melbourne University, and Dudley Le Souёf, an ornithologist and zoo director. Le Souёf in particular shared the same special interests as Campbell, being a photographer and presenter of "lantern lectures", the owner of an impressive egg collection, and working with Campbell in establishing the RAOU and its journal, Emu.

Campbell also freely acknowledged his debt to the Englishman who had become the pioneer of Australian ornithology, John Gould (1804-1881).

Both men shared an absence of secondary and tertiary education; and both undertook self-education so thoroughly that they became pre-eminent in their fields, and the books they wrote quickly became the standard scientific texts on their chosen subjects. Gould's Birds of Australia provided a foundation for Campbell's 1883 presentation and 1901 book on Nests and eggs of Australian birds. Where Gould described many species of Australian birds new to science, Campbell added innovative information about eggs and nests.

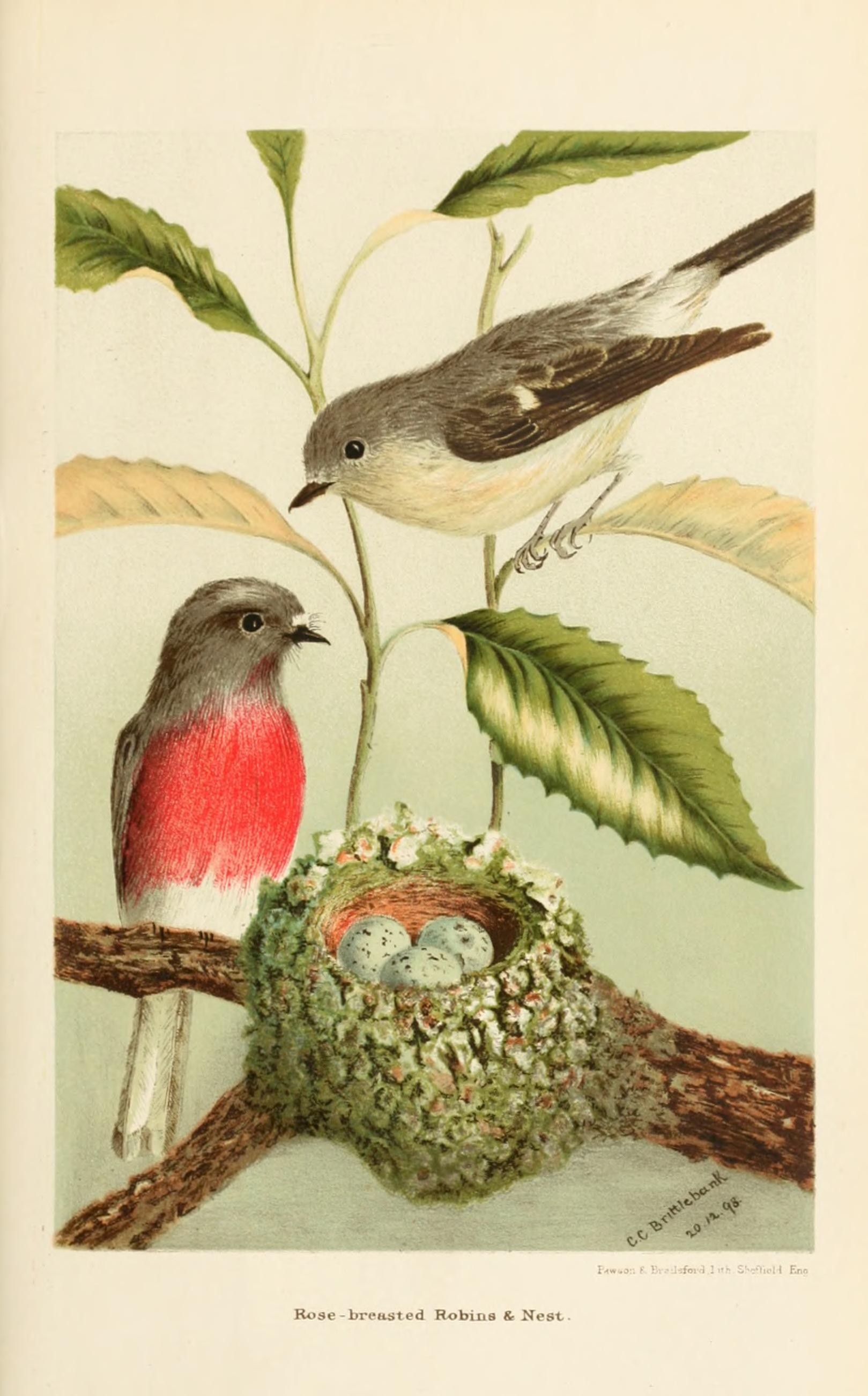
Drawing entitled 'Rose-breasted robin' by C. C. Brittlebank, page 142 of Nests and Eggs, 1840–1848. Modern name: rose robin Petroica rosea.

Both writers made use of the newest technology available to illustrate their scientific data. Until 1840, Gould's pictures of birds were drawn and painted by his wife Elizabeth Coxon; many were reproduced by means of the recently invented technique of hand-painted lithographs; forty years later, Campbell's images of nests, eggs and habitat were created by the cutting-edge technology of photography.

In his text Campbell frequently refers the reader to Gould's illustrations of the birds that he (Campbell) is writing about, e.g. in his entry on page 87 for the magpie-lark Grallina cyanoleuca Campbell notes that the bird is illustrated in: "Figure - Gould: Birds of Australia, fol., vol.ii, plate 54". However, he does also include in his own text several coloured illustrations (that of the rose robin, for instance), drawn by artists.

Campbell received great acclaim during his lifetime, such as being invited to be a Colonial Member of the British Ornithologists' Union in 1902, and an Honorary Fellow of the American Ornithologists' Union in 1904 and this international recognition was important for the Australian ornithological community as a whole.

Two leading Australian ornithological organisations owed their existence, at least in part, to Campbell, who was instrumental in their creation: the Royal Australasian Ornithologists Union (RAOU) founded in 1901, and the (Victorian) Bird Observers Club founded in 1905.

== Study of Australian plants ==
After birds, Campbell's most intense fascination was with Australian native flora, and particularly wattle trees (acacias) of which there are currently thought to be 1070 species.

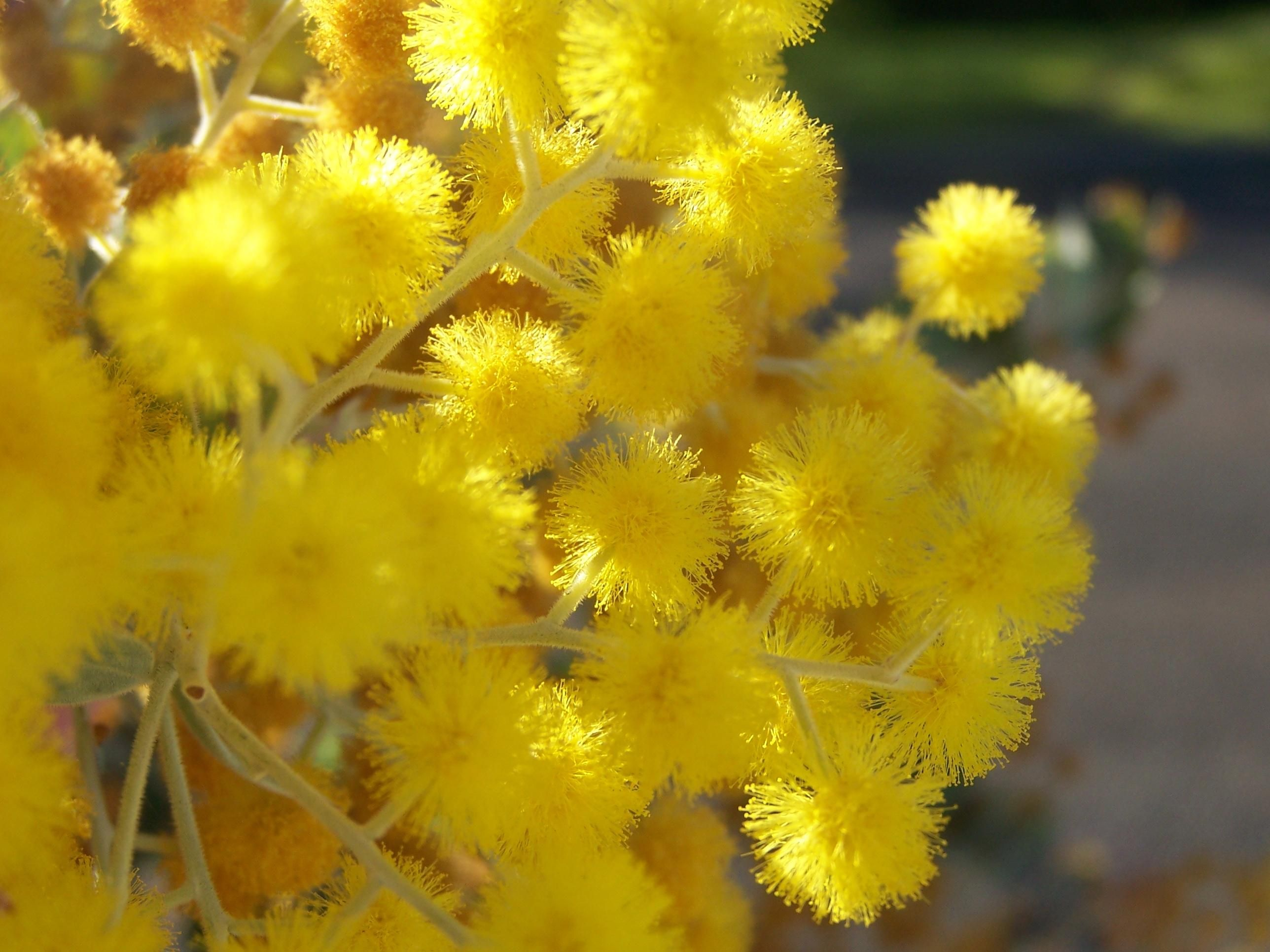
Campbell successfully campaigned for the golden wattle Acacia pycnantha to become Australia's national floral emblem

Australian coat of arms with the golden wattle design, 1921

Enthusiasm for wattles existed amongst naturalists in Tasmania, South Australia and New South Wales, as well as in Victoria. Campbell's advocacy resulted in the formation in 1899 of a 'Wattle Club' in Victoria, to promote public interest in wattles and organise bush excursions on the first day of September every year.

With the advent of Federation in 1901, Campbell began campaigning to have one of the wattle species, the golden wattle Acacia pycnantha, nominated as Australia's national floral emblem (in the same way as Ireland has the shamrock, Scotland the thistle, and so on). The matter was contentious - R.T.Baker campaigned just as hard for the flower of the Waratah Telopea speciosissima to be chosen. However, the Waratah has remained as the floral emblem of the state of New South Wales.

The official proclamation concerning the golden wattle as emblem did not occur for many decades (during the Australian Bicentenary celebrations in 1988) but on 19 September 1912 it was incorporated into the design which is still seen in the coat of arms, and was 'granted' under royal warrant by King George V.

Efforts were made to unify the wattle-enthusiasts across Australian by creating the Wattle Federation of Australasia, inaugurated in Melbourne in January 1913, as reported in the Examiner, on Fri 17 Jan 1913, Page 7, in an article entitled 'The Wattle Federation':

Three delegates from each state were invited to attend the function, at which the wattle federation was started. Tasmania alone failed to send delegates, but the promoters, finding that [Tasmanians] Dr. Purdy and Mr. Seager were in Melbourne, invited these gentlemen to attend ... The Prime Minister (Right Hon. A. Fisher) presided at the inaugural dinner. - Examiner, 1913

Another milestone was passed on 19 April 1984 when the wattle's green and gold colours became Australia's national colours. A formal proclamation was made by the Governor-General, Sir Ninian Stevens, that: "green and gold ... shall be the national colours of Australia for use on all occasions on which such colours are customarily used".

Following the 1988 official selection of the golden wattle as Australia's floral emblem, the final step of the journey that Campbell had begun in 1901 was taken when, in 1992, consensus was reached amongst the Commonwealth and all states and territories that the first day of Spring (1 September) should be Wattle Day throughout Australia.

== Photography ==
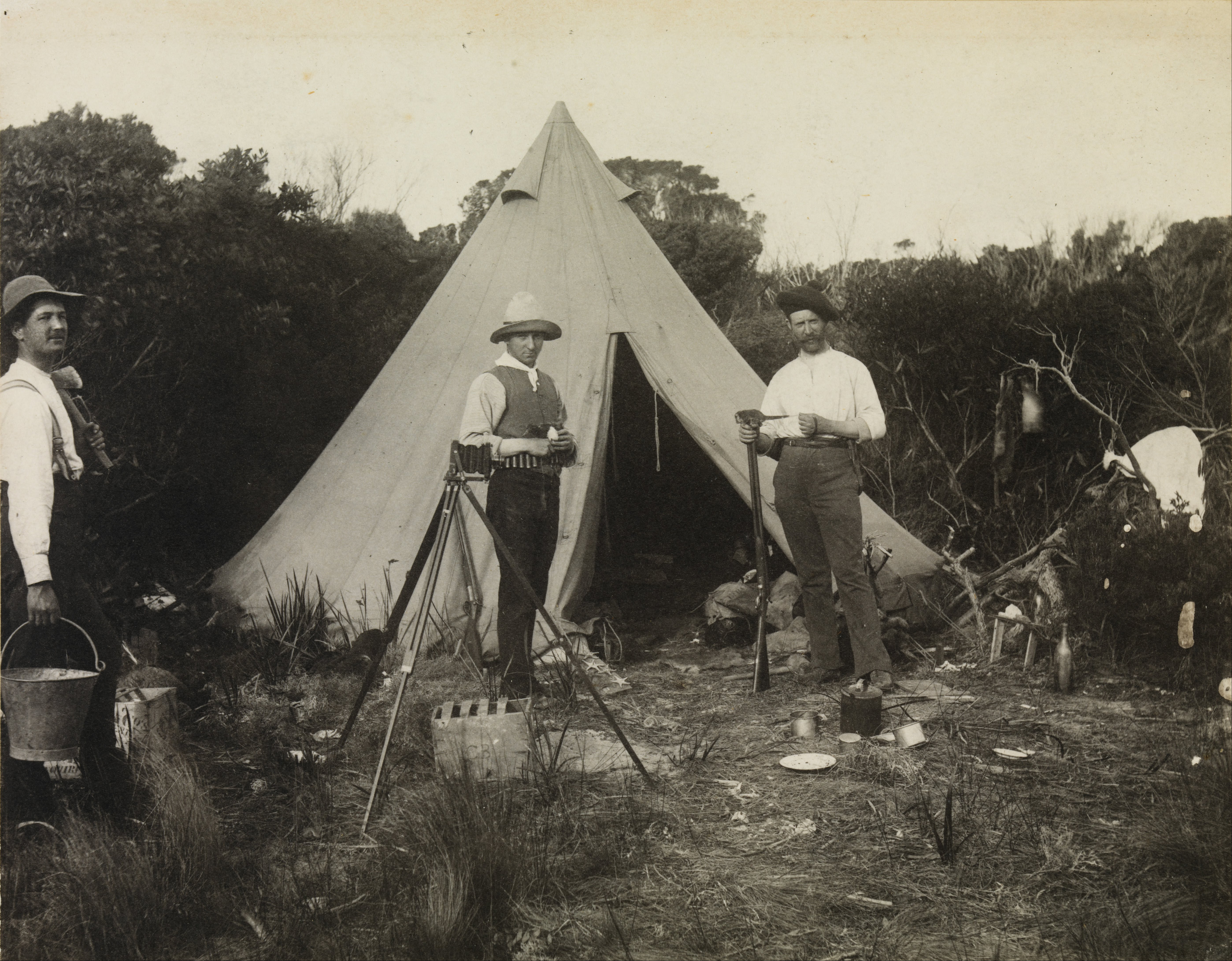
Camp View, Field Naturalists ' Club Expedition to King Island, 1887, by AJ Campbell

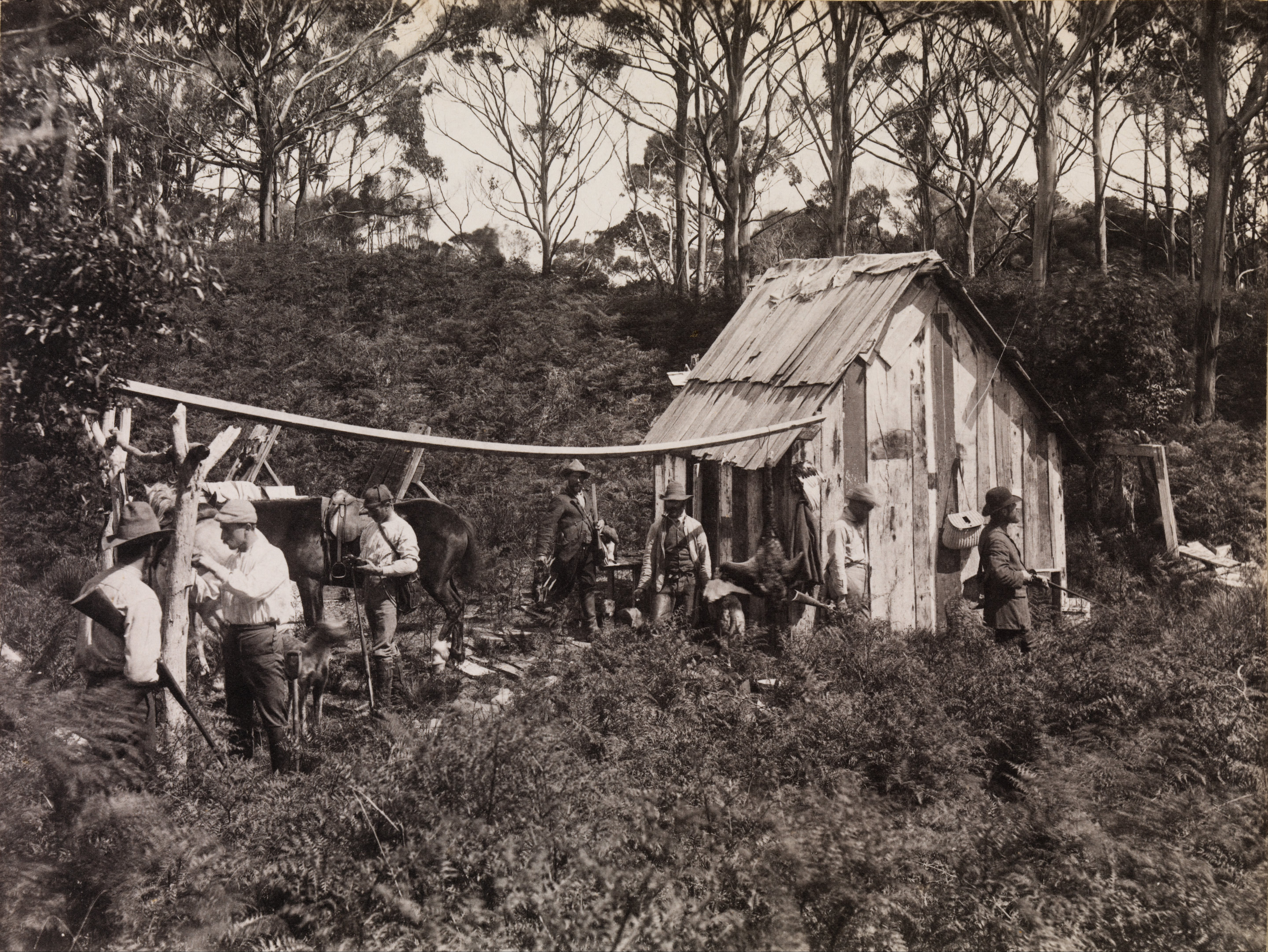
Bertie's Hut, Field Naturalists ' Club Expedition to King Island, 1887, by AJ Campbell

Much of the evidence for Campbell's innovative work as a photographer is held by Museum Victoria, having been donated by Campbell himself, on 22 December 1915:

This collection consists of 2,772 images taken by Archibald James Campbell. These are made up of a combination of black and white prints and glass negatives. Many of the images of birds and nests were used by Campbell in his book Nests and Eggs of Australian Birds, including the Geographical Distribution of the Species and Popular Observations Thereon, published in 1900. There is also a significant number of images taken by Campbell on his various field trips around Australia with groups such as the Ornithologists Union, Victorian Field Naturalists, The Working Men's College Photographic Club and his family. - Museum Victoria.

His photographs provide not only a demonstration of the state of the art of photography in the 1880s but also a detailed historical record of conditions for the pioneering naturalists, who were sometimes accompanied on their expeditions by wives and children. For example, two of Campbell's photographs of the 1887-1888 FNCV expedition to King Island, Tasmania show the accommodation on the near-uninhabited island. Only the family of the lighthouse keeper and one kangaroo hunter were on the island to lend assistance to the group during their nineteen-day visit. As Campbell relates, when provisions were depleted and they began to run out of flour "a little bran was mixed, to stay its rapid progress. As the flour became thinner so the bran increased; finally, the last 'mash' was all bran."

== Final years ==
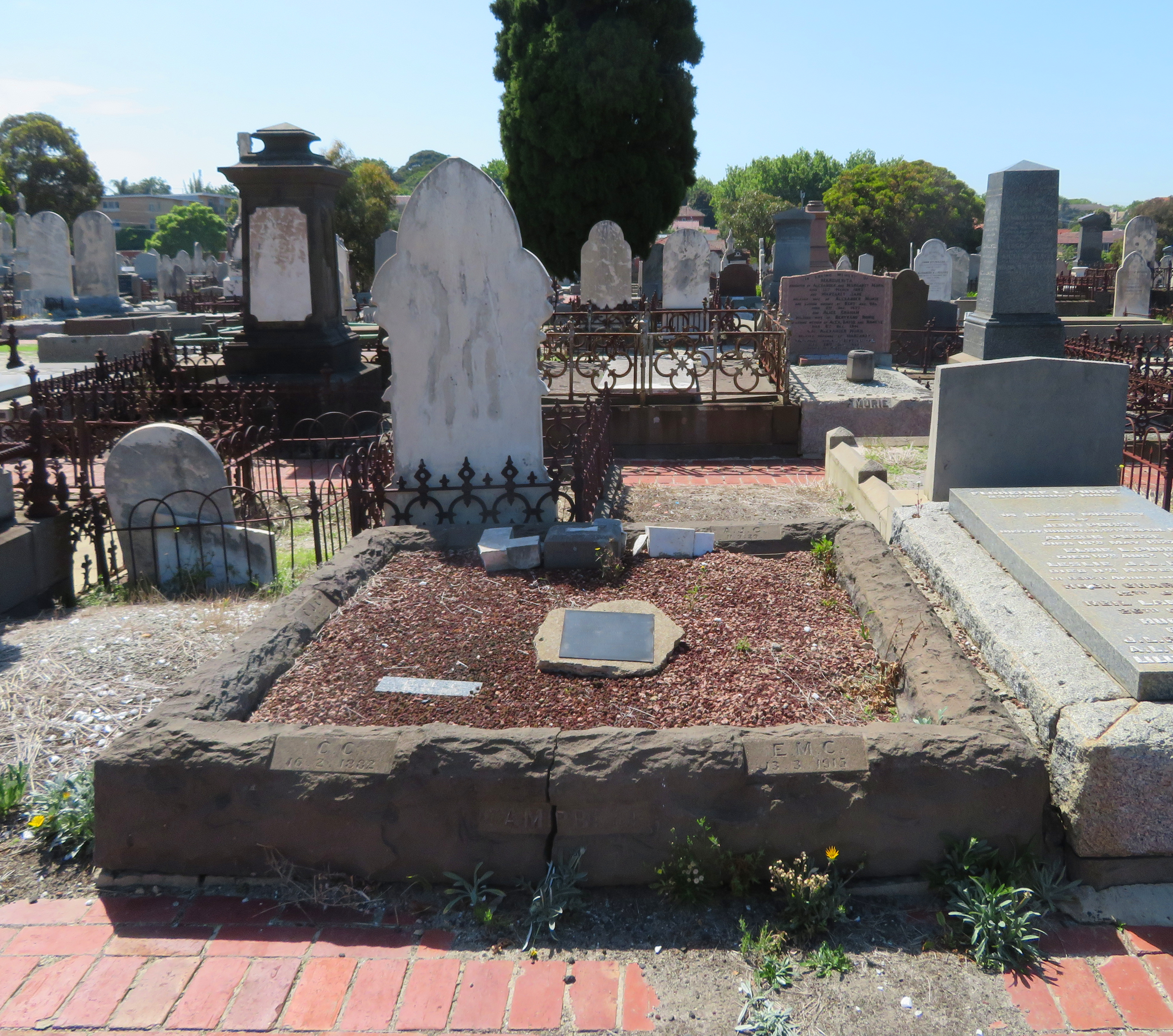
Campbell family grave near Melbourne, in the St Kilda Cemetery, Presbyterian Compartment B, graves 132-134

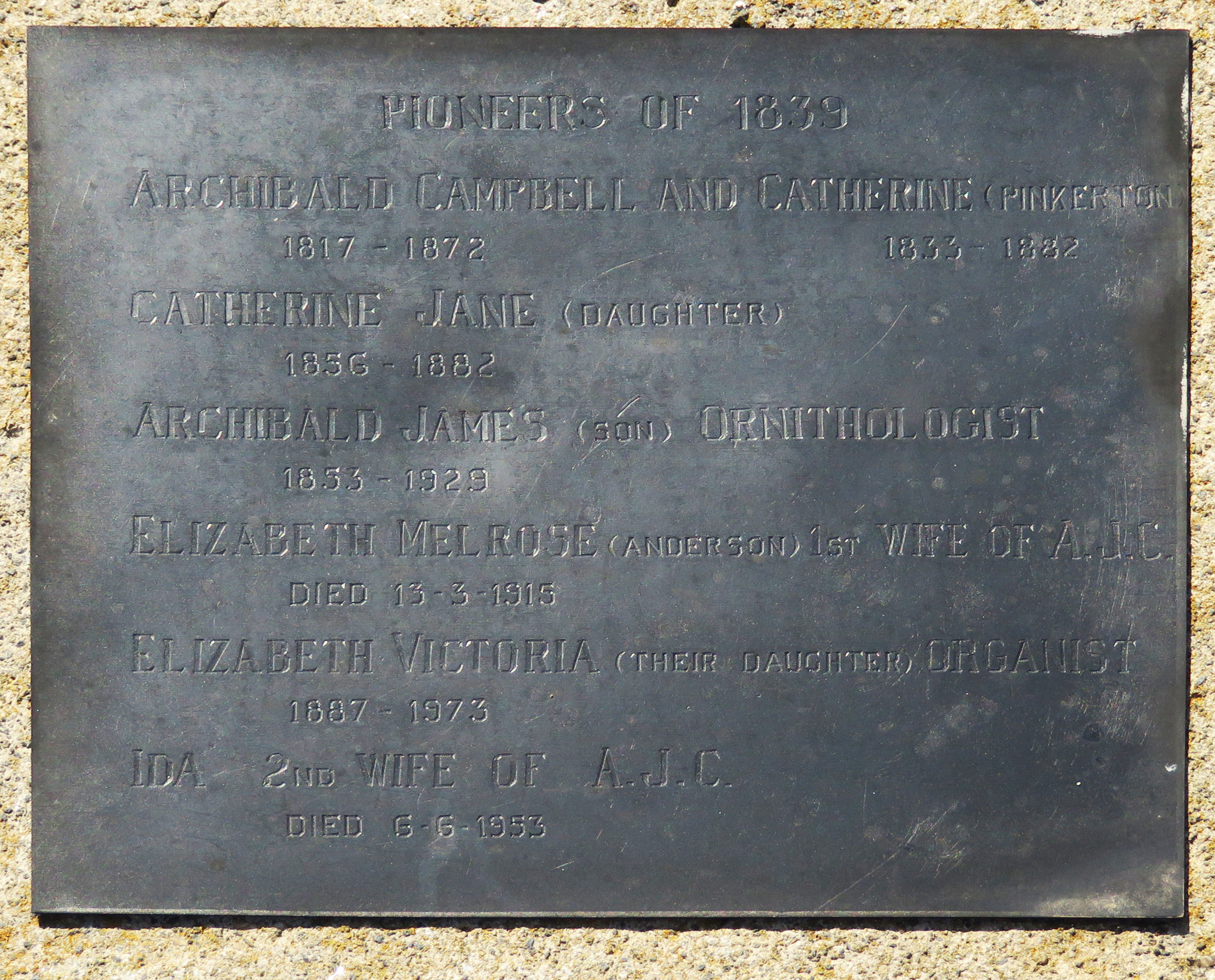
Campbell is buried with six other members of his family. The plaque is headed: "Pioneers of 1839"

After retiring from employment, in 1914, Campbell's life continued to be filled with activity and events.

After the loss of his first wife, Elizabeth Melrose Anderson (1855-1915), Campbell married again, to Blanche Duncan (1870-1953), and took up residence in Box Hill (which was still a rural area at that time).

He continued his expeditions and his writing, and one of his retirement projects was to prepare a new book of text and photographs entitled Golden wattle, our national floral emblem.

He died on 12 September 1929, after having prepared a speech for the RAOU, which was read out posthumously. Campbell is buried in the cemetery in St. Kilda, in what has become a somewhat dilapidated grave. He lies in the company of his father Archibald James Campbell, his mother Catherine Pinkerton, his sister Catherine Jane Campbell, his first wife, Elizabeth Melrose Anderson, their daughter Elizabeth Victoria Campbell, and his second wife, Blanche Duncan.

== Legacy ==
Besides the scientific associations that he helped to bring into existence and which still exist in one form or another, Campbell left a large body of written and photographic work. Some of the key texts are mentioned below:

Articles:

The FNCV journal the Victorian Naturalist has two notable articles from Campbell which later also appeared in the Australasian:

- Campbell, AJ 1888, 'Field Naturalists Club of Victoria: expedition to King Island, 1887: official report', The Victorian Naturalist, 4, 129–135.
- Campbell, AJ 1888, 'Field Naturalists Club of Victoria: expedition to King Island, 1887: narrative of the expedition', The Victorian Naturalist, 4, 146–162.

The National Library of Australia has many of Campbell's papers, in their collection entitled the A. J. Campbell Collection. Box 3 holds a scrapbook containing 77 articles by Campbell that were published in the "Australasian" 1893–1900.

The journal Emu was published by the RAOU. Campbell contributed many articles to it, whilst also acting as co-editor for thirteen years.

Books:

Campbell, AJ 1883, Nests and Eggs of Australian birds, embracing papers on "Oology of Australian birds" read before the Field Naturalists Club of Victoria, published by the author, Melbourne, Victoria, Australia.

Campbell, AJ 1974, Nests and eggs of Australian birds, including the geographical distribution of the species and popular observations thereon, Wren, Melbourne, Victoria, Australia. (First edition, 1901).

Campbell, AJ 1921, Golden wattle, our national floral emblem, Osboldstone, Melbourne, Victoria, Australia.
