= List of birds of Australia =

The list scope includes outlying islands: 1. Cocos (Keeling) Islands; 2. Christmas Island; 3. Ashmore Reef; 4. Torres Strait Islands; 5. Lord Howe Island; 6. Norfolk Island; 7. Macquarie Island; 8. Heard Island and McDonald Islands

This is a list of the wild birds found in Australia including its outlying islands and territories, but excluding the Australian Antarctic Territory. The outlying islands covered include: Christmas, Cocos (Keeling), Ashmore, Torres Strait, Coral Sea, Lord Howe, Norfolk, Macquarie and Heard/McDonald. The list includes introduced species, common vagrants and recently extinct species. It excludes species only present in captivity. 980 extant and extinct species are listed.

There have been three comprehensive accounts: the first was John Gould's 1840s seven-volume series The Birds of Australia, the second Gregory Mathews, and the third was the Handbook of Australian, New Zealand and Antarctic Birds (1990-2006).

The taxonomy originally followed is from Christidis and Boles, 2008. Their system has been developed over nearly two decades and has strong local support, but deviates in important ways from more generally accepted schemes. Supplemental updates follow The Clements Checklist of Birds of the World, 2022 edition.

This list uses British English throughout. Bird names and other wording follows that convention.

== Ostriches ==
Order: Struthioniformes Family: Struthionidae

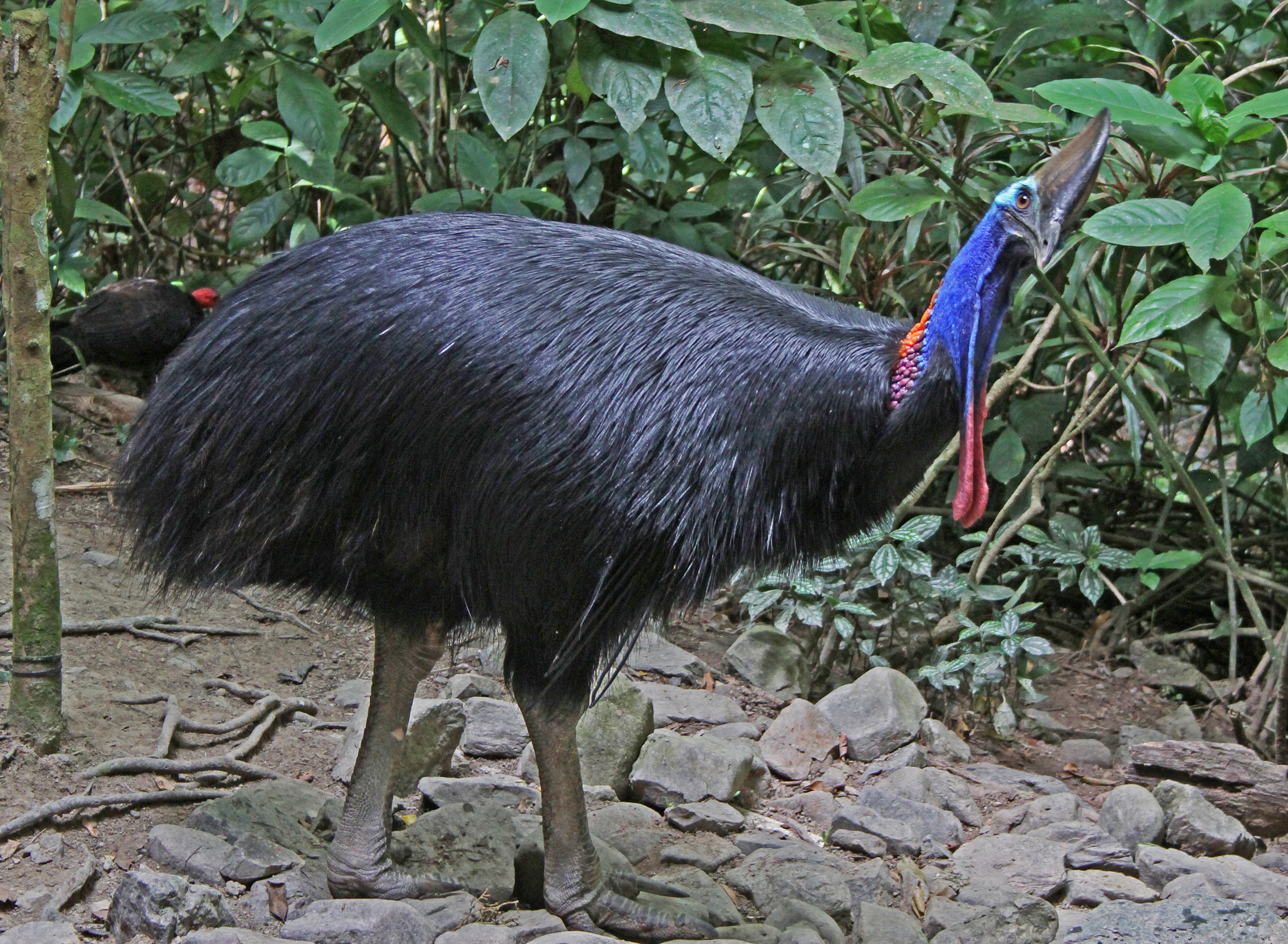
Southern cassowary

1 species recorded [1 introduced]
This order is not native to Australia, but feral populations of one species have become established in South Australia and possibly on the New South Wales/Victoria border.

Common name	Binomial	Notes
Common ostrich	Struthio camelus	introduced

== Cassowaries and emu ==
Order: Casuariiformes Family: Casuariidae

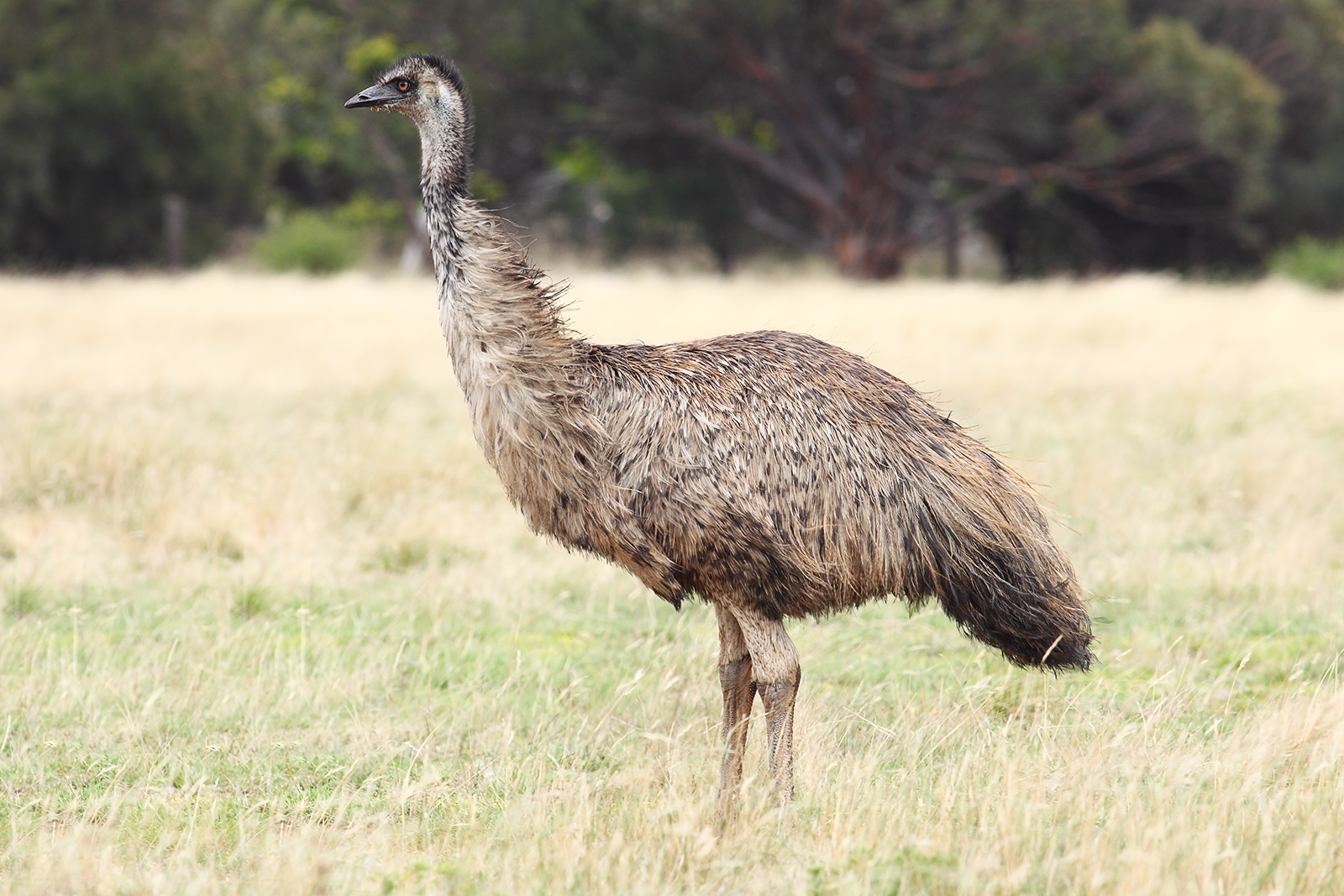
Emu

2 species recorded [2 extant native]
This family of flightless ratite birds is represented by two living species in Australia. Another two species are found in New Guinea. The extinct, geographically isolated King and Kangaroo Island emus were historically considered to be separate species to mainland emus. However, genetic evidence from 2011 suggests that all three are conspecific.

Common name	Binomial	Notes
Southern cassowary	Casuarius casuarius	
Emu	Dromaius novaehollandiae	

== Magpie goose ==
Order: Anseriformes Family: Anseranatidae

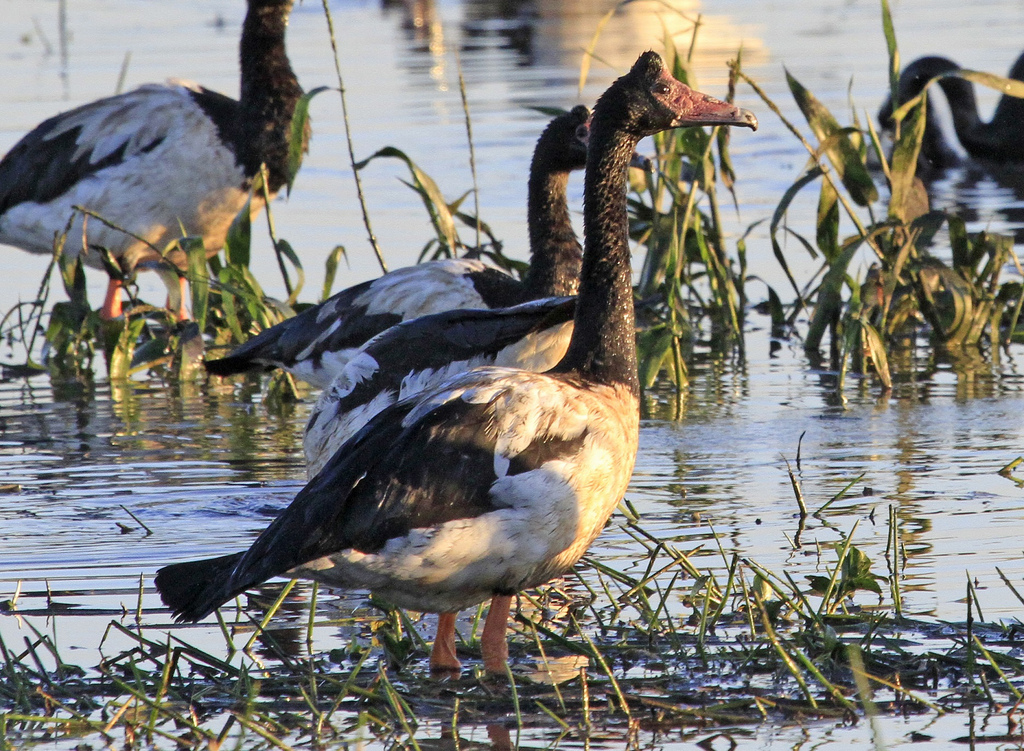
Magpie goose at Fogg Dam in the Northern Territory

1 species recorded [1 extant native]
The family contains a single species, the magpie goose. It was an early and distinctive offshoot of the anseriform family tree, diverging after the screamers and before all other ducks, geese and swans, sometime in the late Cretaceous. The single species is found across Australia.

Common name	Binomial	Notes
Magpie goose	Anseranas semipalmata	

== Ducks, geese, and waterfowl ==
Order: Anseriformes Family: Anatidae

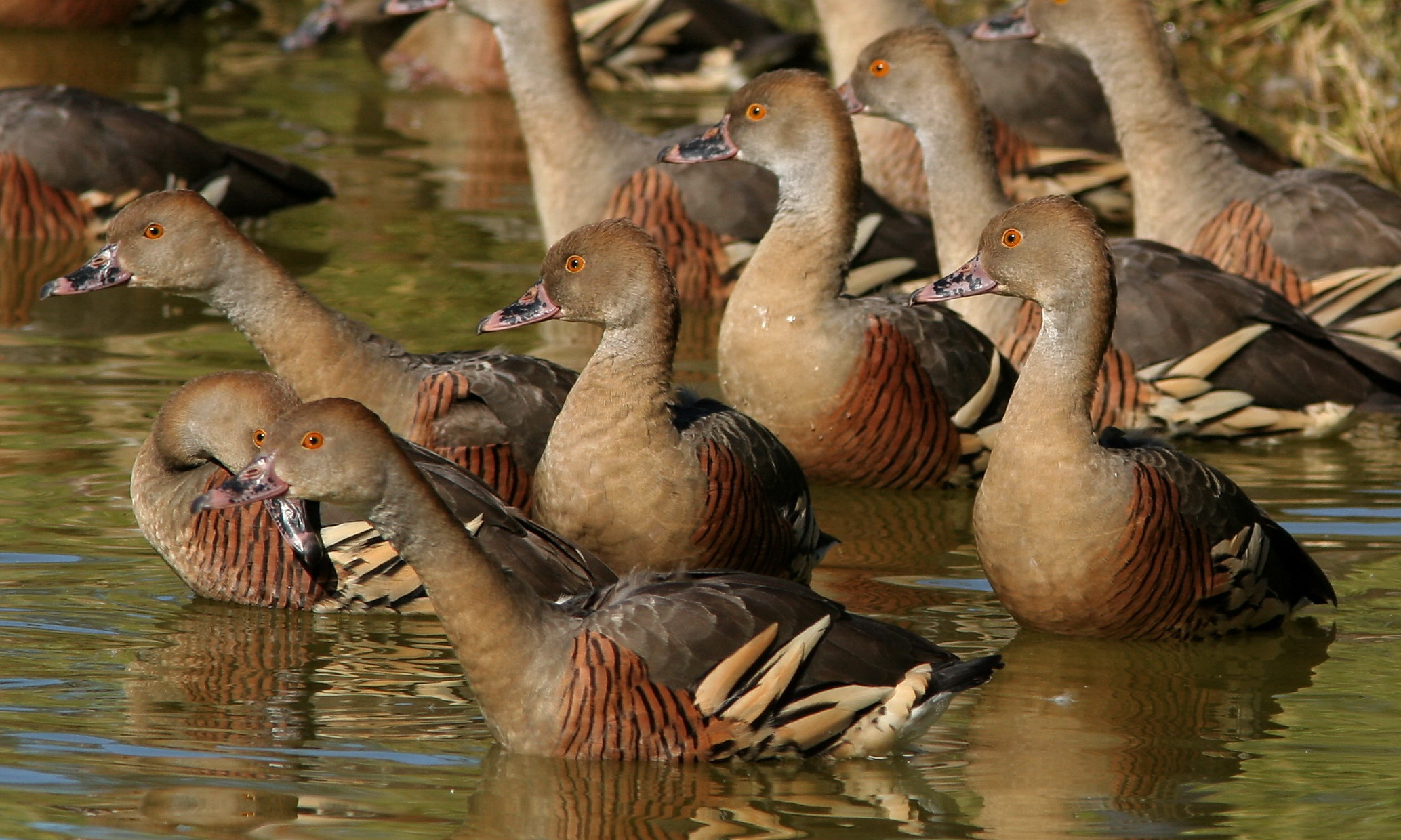
Plumed whistling ducks

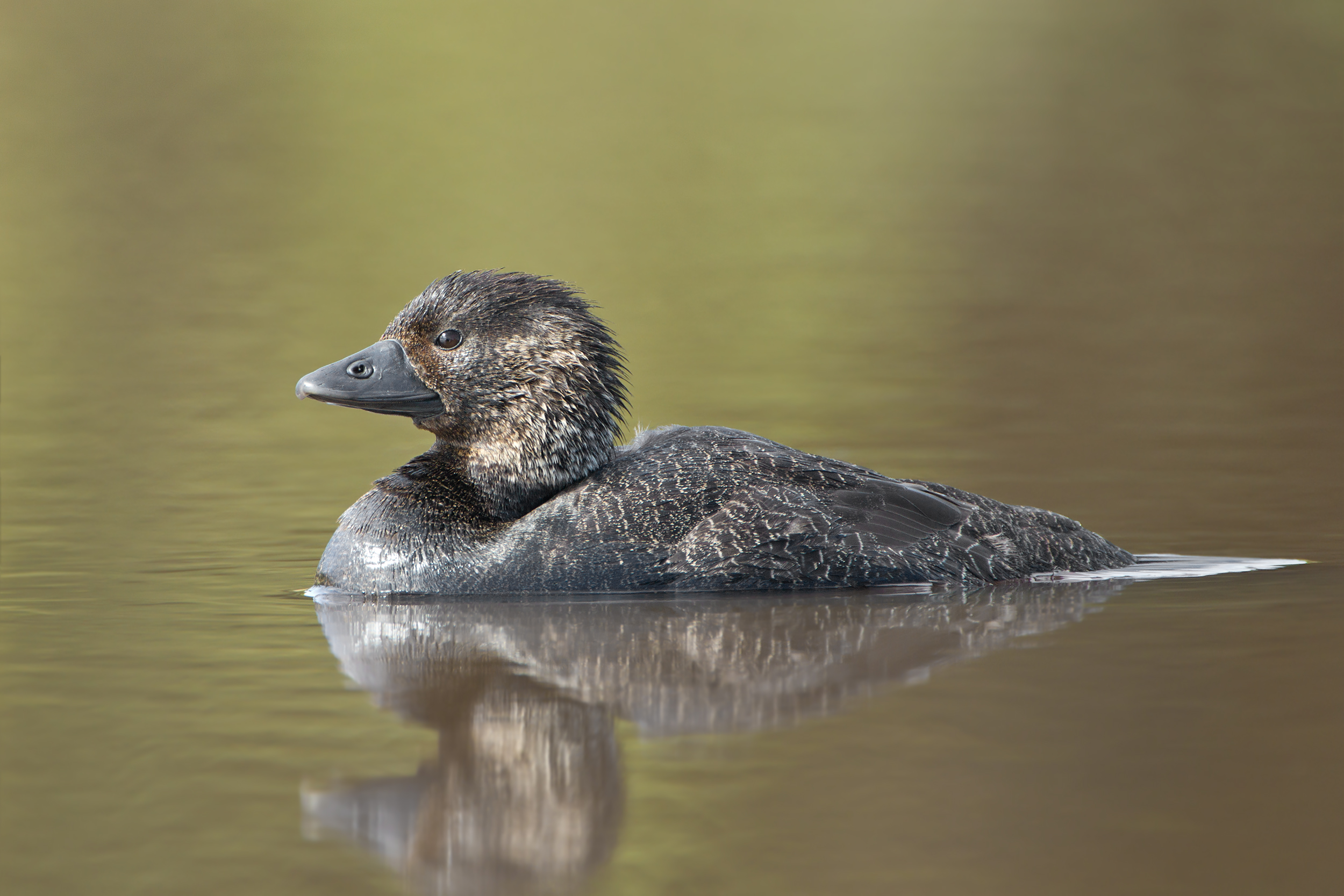
Musk duck

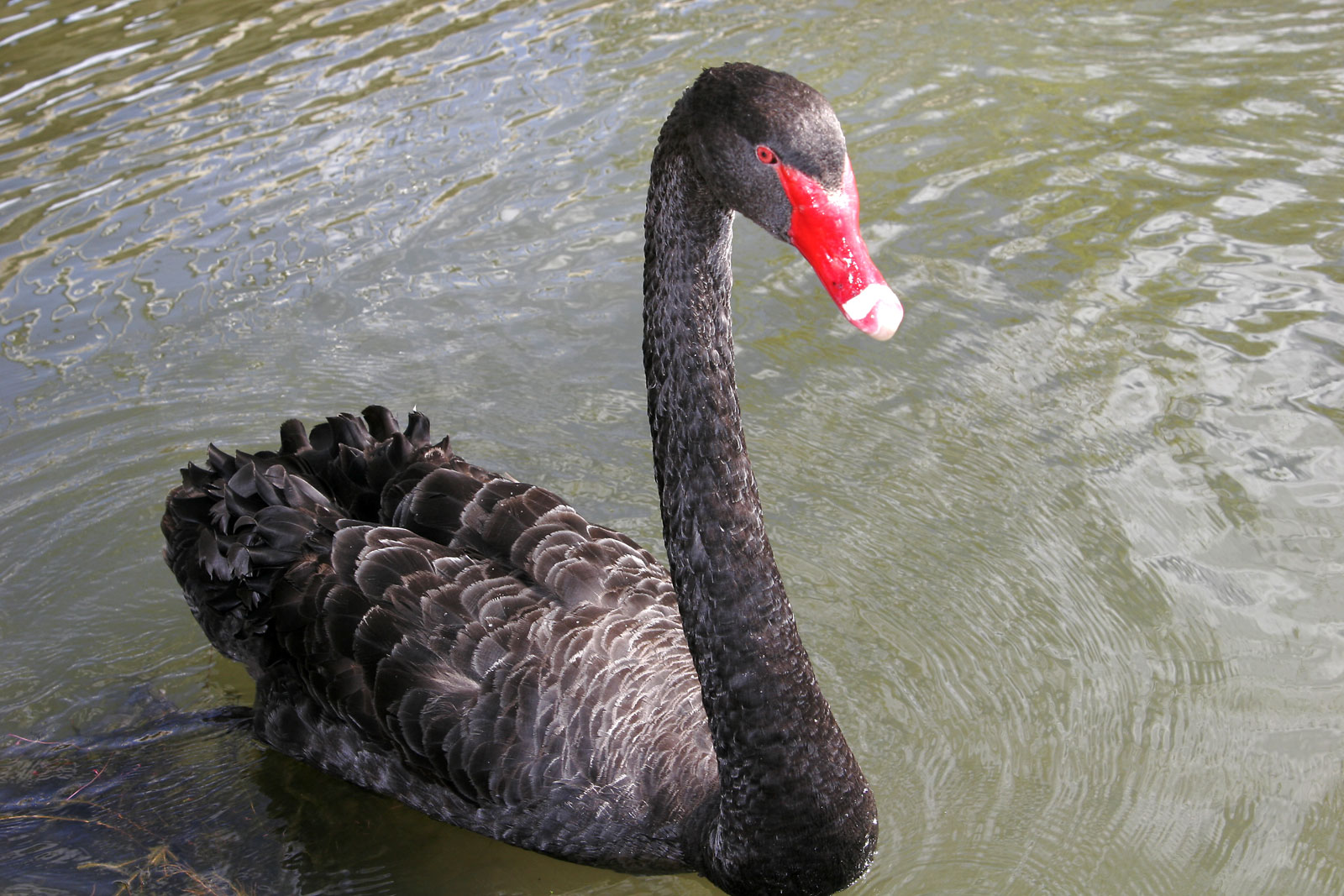
Black swan

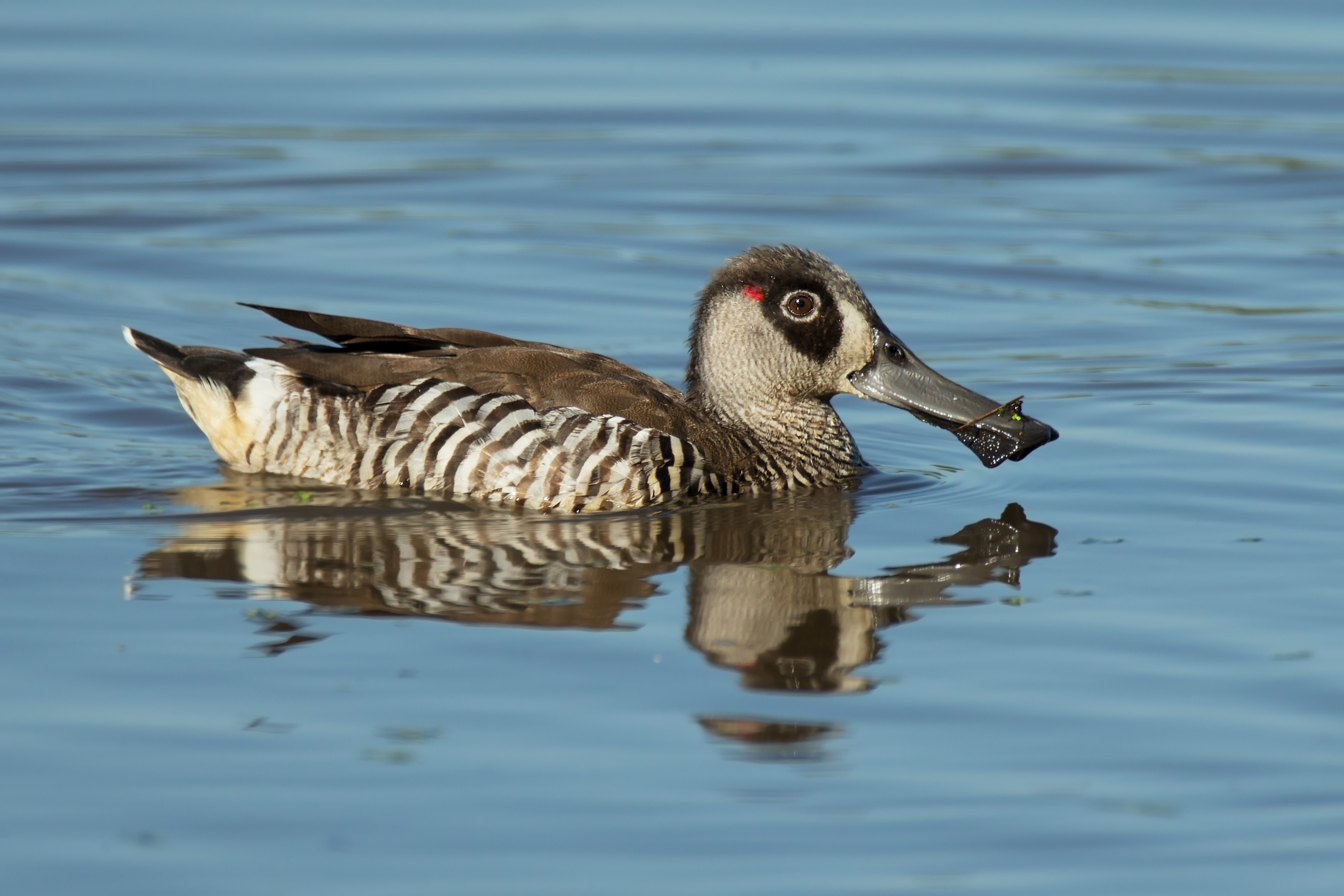
Pink-eared duck

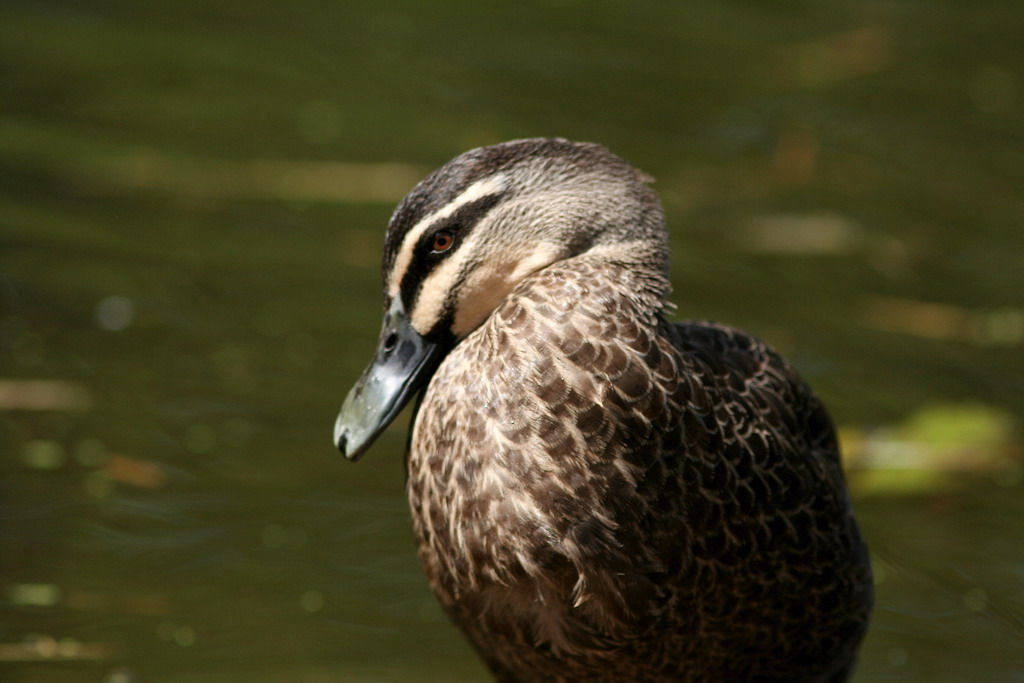
Pacific black duck

32 species recorded [20 extant native, 4 introduced, 7 vagrant, 1 hybrid]
The family Anatidae includes the ducks and most duck-like waterfowl, such as geese and swans. These are adapted for an aquatic existence, with webbed feet, bills that are flattened to a greater or lesser extent, and feathers that are excellent at shedding water due to special oils. In Australia, 30 species have been recorded, of which three have been introduced, and seven are vagrants.

Common name	Binomial	Notes
Spotted whistling-duck	Dendrocygna guttata	
Plumed whistling-duck	Dendrocygna eytoni	
Wandering whistling-duck	Dendrocygna arcuata	
Canada goose	Branta canadensis	vagrant, presumably from introduced NZ population
Domestic greylag goose	Anser anser	introduced
Cape Barren goose	Cereopsis novaehollandiae	
Freckled duck	Stictonetta naevosa	
Mute swan	Cygnus olor	introduced
Black swan	Cygnus atratus	
Radjah shelduck	Radjah radjah	
Australian shelduck	Tadorna tadornoides	
Paradise shelduck	Tadorna variegata	vagrant, Lord Howe Island & NSW
Green pygmy-goose	Nettapus pulchellus	
Cotton pygmy-goose	Nettapus coromandelianus	
Australian wood duck	Chenonetta jubata	
Garganey	Spatula querquedula	
Australian shoveler	Spatula rhynchotis	
Northern shoveler	Spatula clypeata	vagrant
Eurasian wigeon	Mareca penelope	vagrant
Pacific black duck	Anas superciliosa	
Domestic mallard	Anas platyrhynchos domesticus	introduced
Pacific black duck × mallard hybrid	Anas superciliosa × platyrhynchos	native × introduced hybrid
Domestic muscovy duck	Cairina moschata domesticus	introduced
Northern pintail	Anas acuta	vagrant
Green-winged teal	Anas crecca	vagrant, Cocos (Keeling) Island
Grey teal	Anas gracilis	
Chestnut teal	Anas castanea	
Pink-eared duck	Malacorhynchus membranaceus	
Hardhead	Aythya australis	
Tufted duck	Aythya fuligula	vagrant
Blue-billed duck	Oxyura australis	
Musk duck	Biziura lobata	

== Megapodes ==
Order: Galliformes Family: Megapodiidae

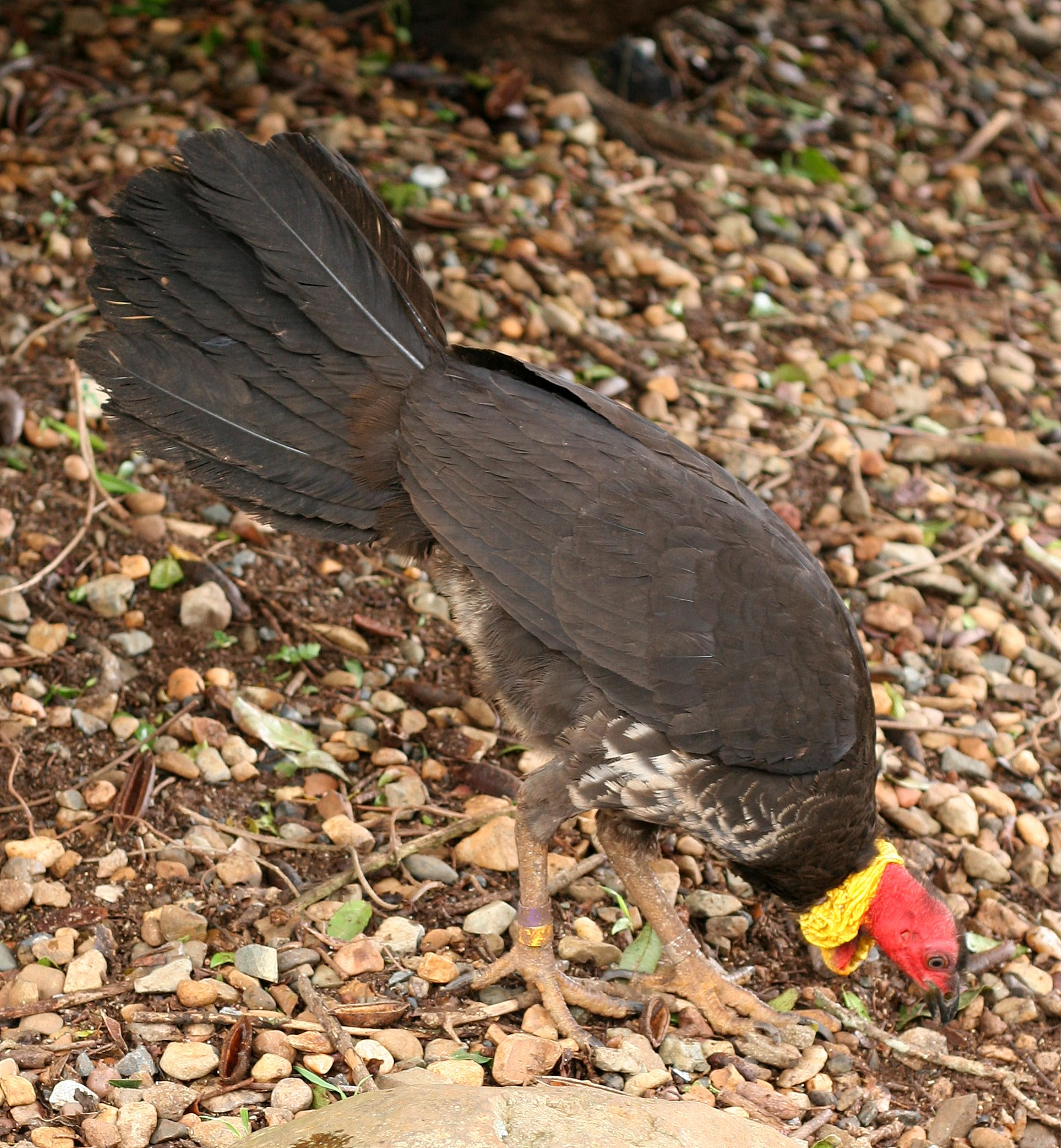
Australian brushturkey

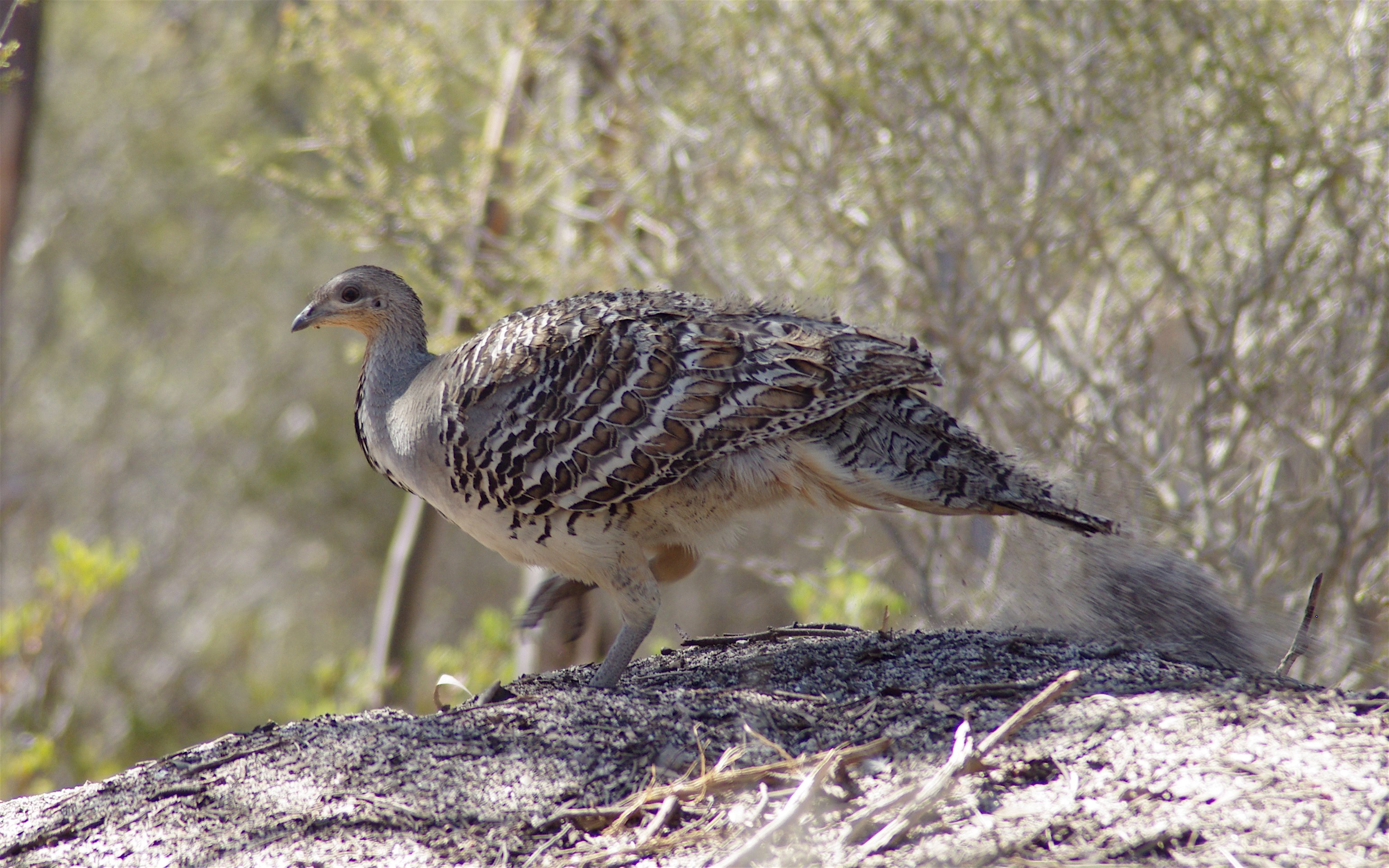
Malleefowl

3 species recorded [3 extant native]
Megapodiidae are represented by various species in the Australasian region, although only three species are found in Australia. They are commonly referred to as "mound-builders" due to their habit of constructing large mounds to incubate their eggs.

Common name	Binomial	Notes
Australian brushturkey	Alectura lathami	
Malleefowl	Leipoa ocellata	
Orange-footed scrubfowl	Megapodius reinwardt	

== Guineafowl ==
Order: Galliformes Family: Numididae

1 species recorded [1 introduced]
Numididae are not native to Australia, but feral populations of one species exist in Queensland.

Common name	Binomial	Notes
Helmeted guineafowl	Numida meleagris	introduced

== New World quail ==
Order: Galliformes Family: Odontophoridae

1 species recorded [1 introduced]
Odontophoridae are not native to Australia, but feral populations of one species survive in external territories and possibly the mainland.

Common name	Binomial	Notes
California quail	Callipepla californica	introduced, Norfolk & King Island

== Pheasants, grouse, and allies ==
Order: Galliformes Family: Phasianidae

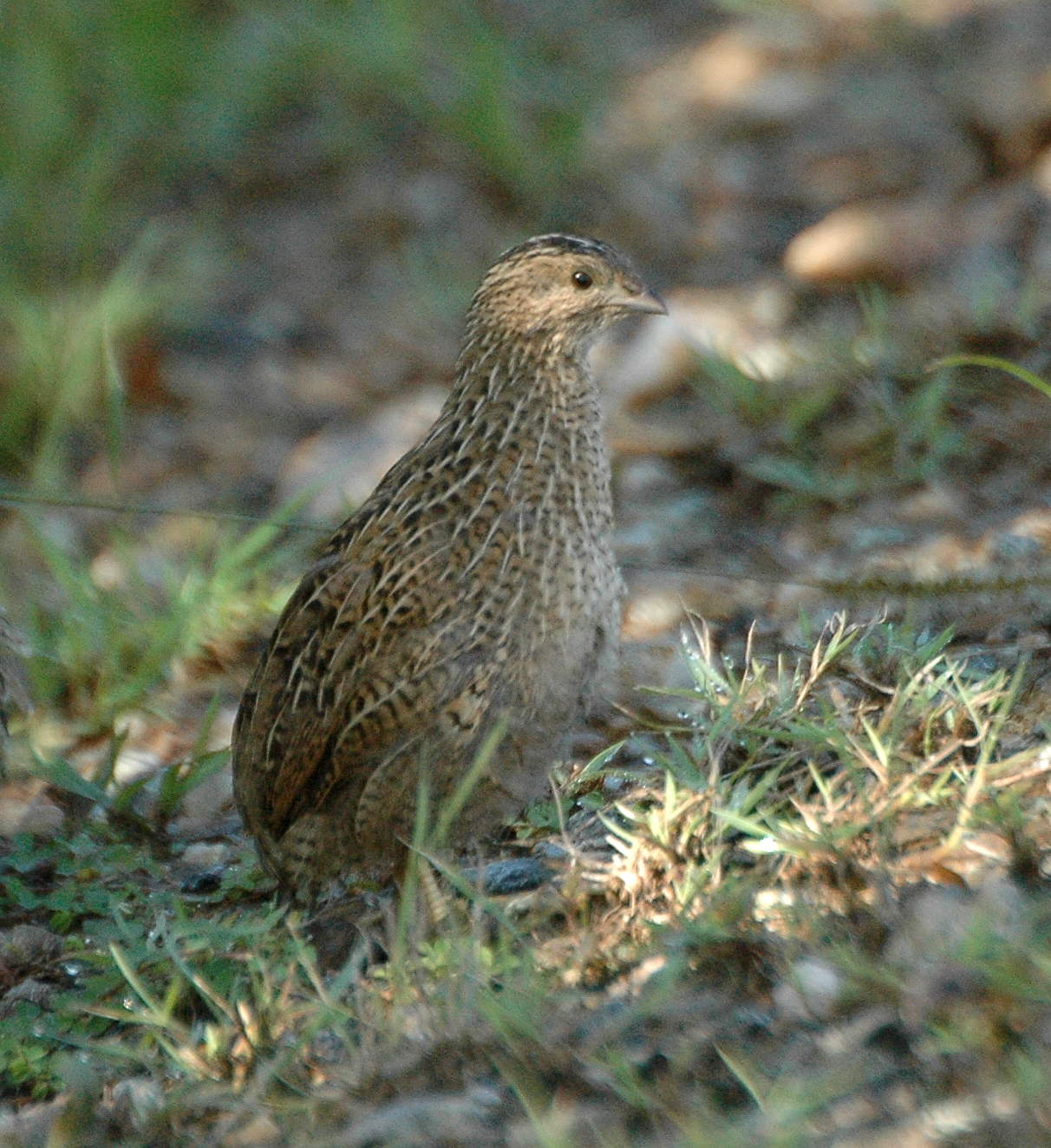
Brown quail

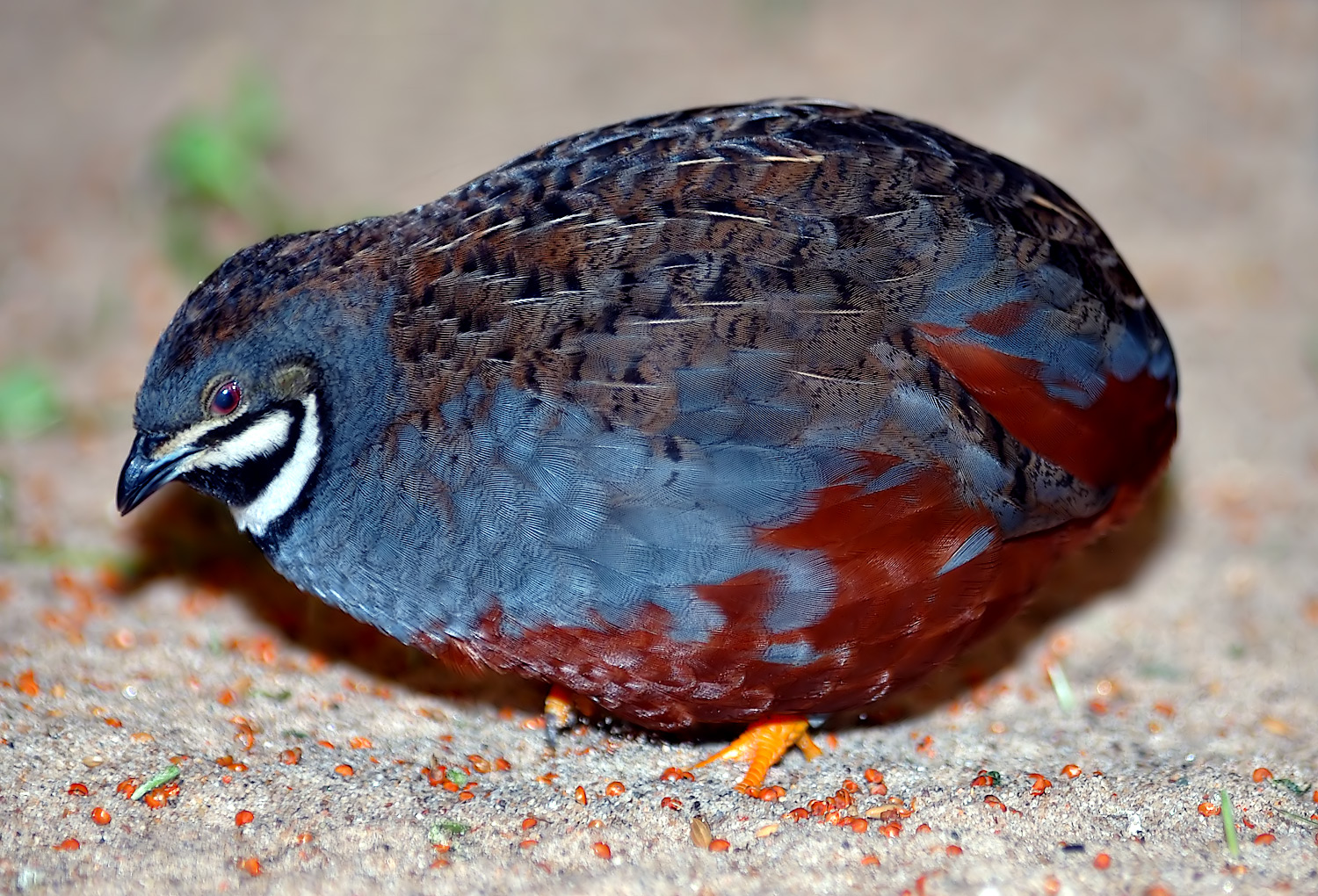
King quail

8 species recorded [3 extant native, 5 introduced]
Phasianidae consists of the pheasants and their allies. These are terrestrial species, variable in size but generally plump, with broad, relatively short wings. Many species are gamebirds or have been domesticated as a food source for humans. Three species are native to Australia, and five commonly domesticated species are feral, with most established populations persisting on offshore islands.

Common name	Binomial	Notes
Indian peafowl	Pavo cristatus	introduced, King, Rottnest & Furneaux Islands
Brown quail	Synoicus ypsilophorus	
Blue-breasted quail	Excalfactoria chinensis	
Stubble quail	Coturnix pectoralis	
Red junglefowl	Gallus gallus	introduced, Norfolk & Christmas Island
Green junglefowl	Gallus varius	introduced, Cocos (Keeling) Islands
Ring-necked pheasant	Phasianus colchicus	introduced, King, Flinders & Rottnest Island
Wild turkey	Meleagris gallopavo	introduced, King, Flinders & Kangaroo Island

== Flamingos ==
Order: Phoenicopteriformes Family: Phoenicopteridae

1 species recorded [1 vagrant]
Australia has only a single record of any flamingo species, from the North Keeling Island. Several prehistoric species are also known to have existed.

Common name	Binomial	Notes
Greater flamingo	Phoenicopterus roseus	vagrant, Cocos (Keeling) Islands

== Grebes ==
Order: Podicipediformes Family: Podicipedidae

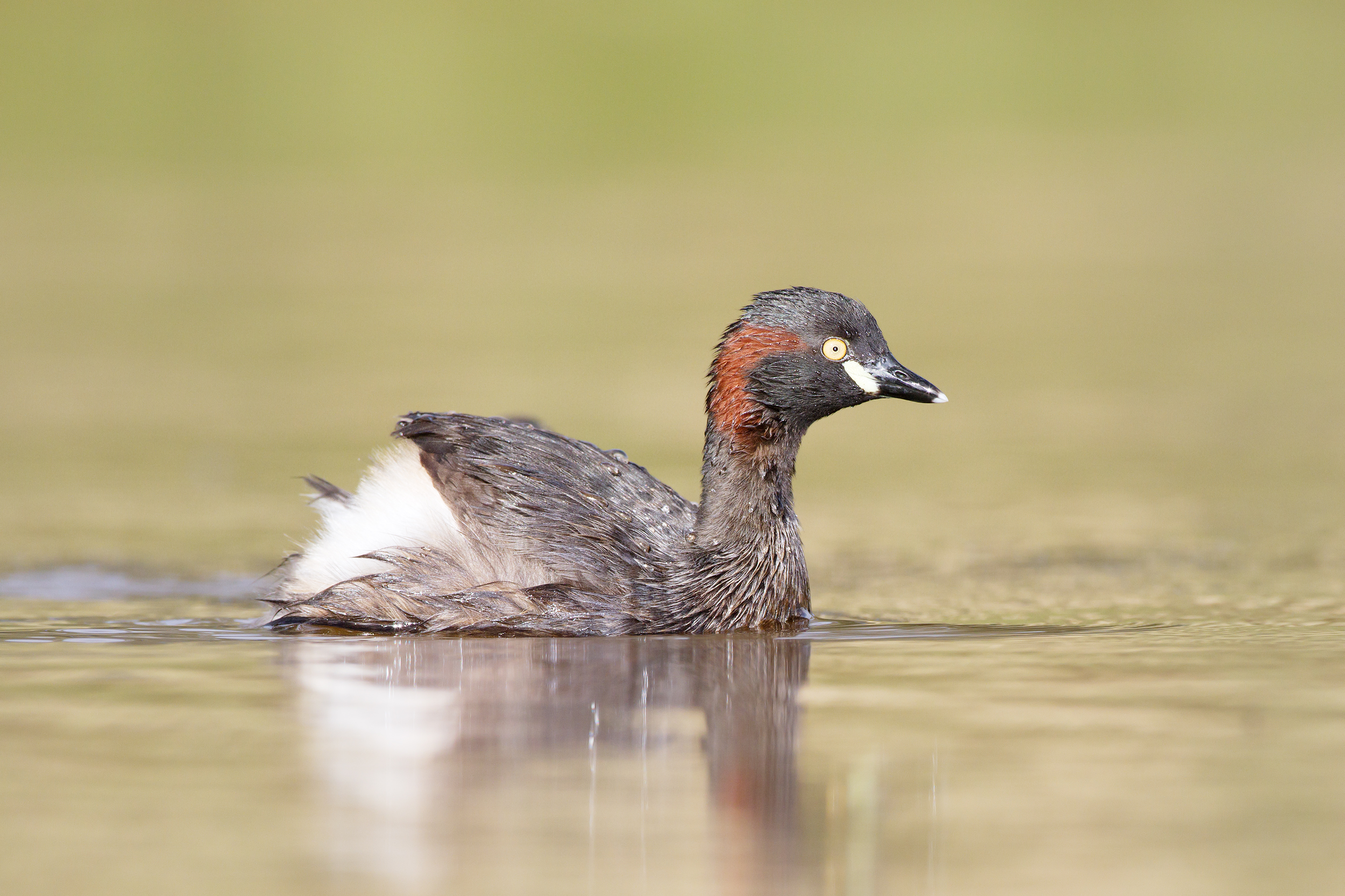
Australasian grebe

4 species recorded [3 extant native, 1 vagrant]
Grebes are small to medium-large freshwater diving birds. They have lobed toes and are excellent swimmers and divers. However, they have their feet placed far back on the body, making them quite ungainly on land. Three species have been regularly recorded in Australia, and a fourth is a vagrant.

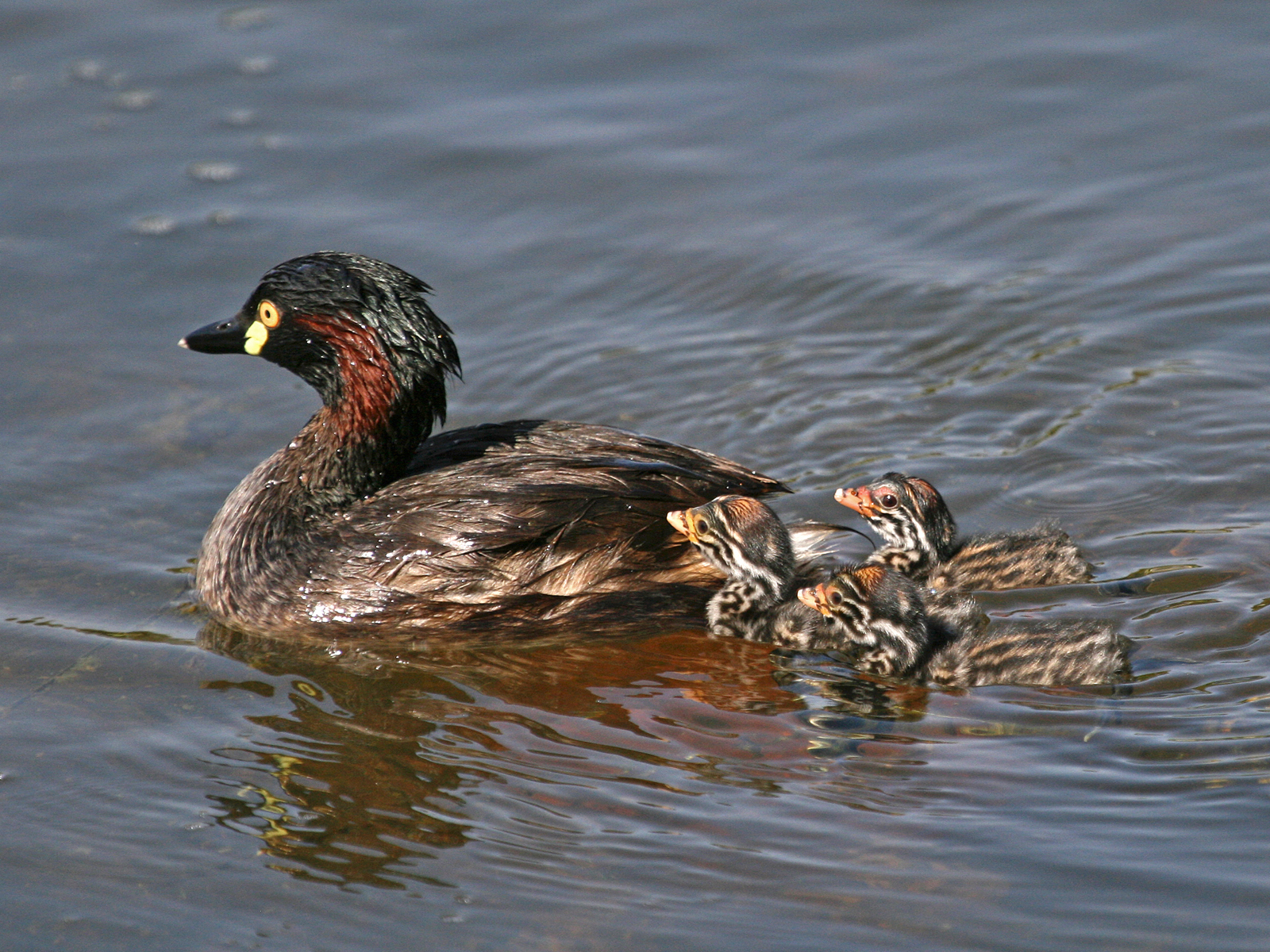
Australasian grebe

Common name	Binomial	Notes
Little grebe	Tachybaptus ruficollis	vagrant
Australasian grebe	Tachybaptus novaehollandiae	
Hoary-headed grebe	Poliocephalus poliocephalus	
Great crested grebe	Podiceps cristatus	

== Pigeons and doves ==
Order: Columbiformes Family: Columbidae

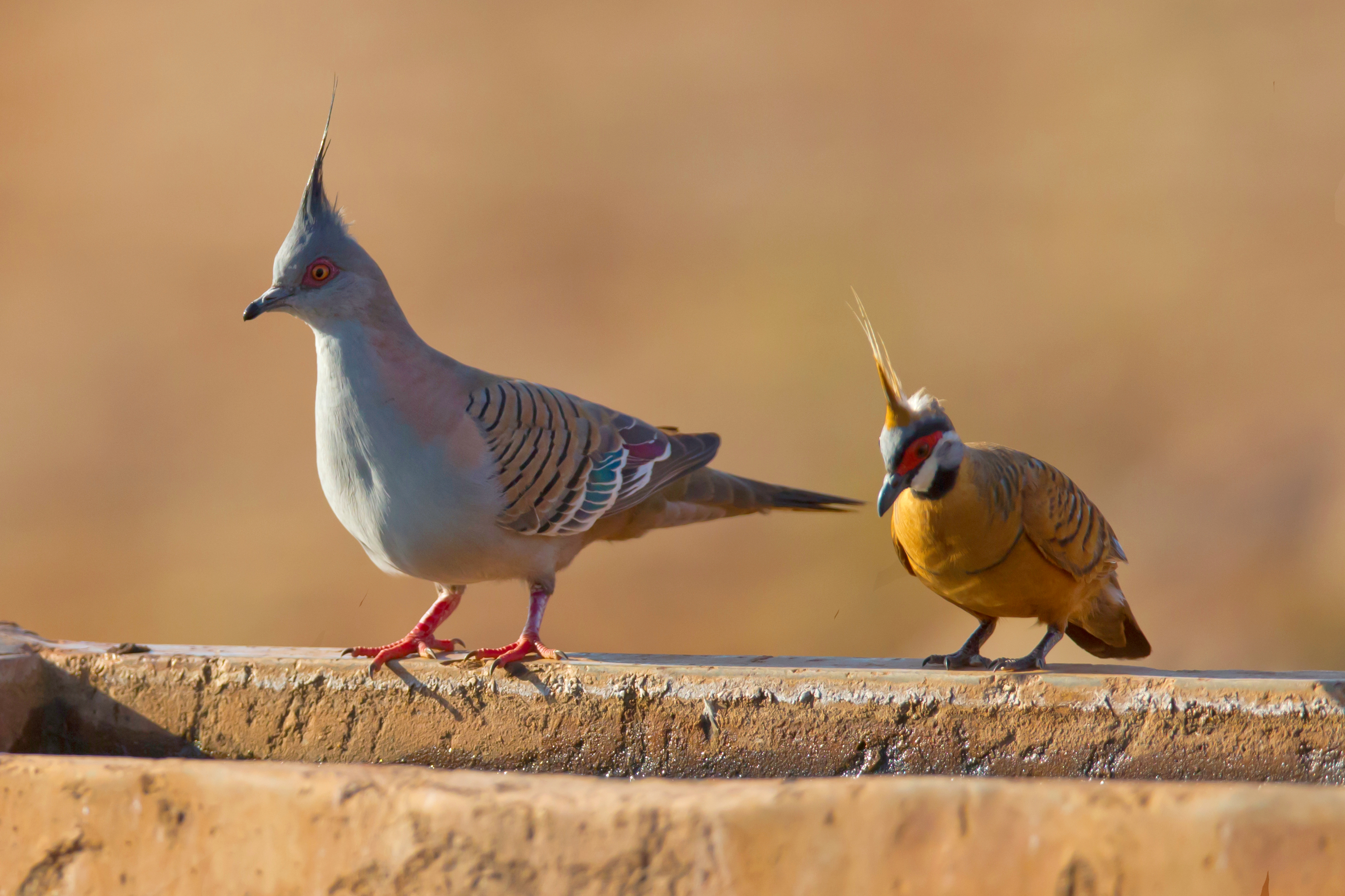
Crested pigeon and spinifex pigeon

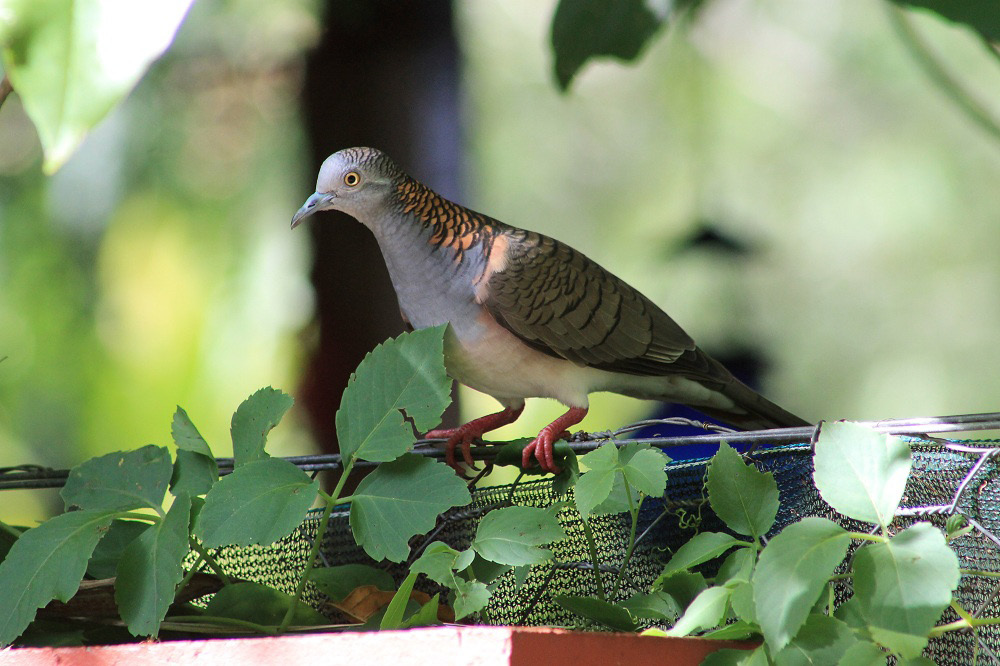
Bar-shouldered dove in Darwin, Northern Territory

39 species recorded [25 extant native, 4 introduced, 7 vagrant, 2 extirpated native, 1 extinct native]
Pigeons and doves are stout-bodied birds with short necks and short slender bills with a fleshy cere. In Australian territory 41 species have been recorded, four of which have been introduced, and another six are vagrants. One has become extinct since European colonisation.

Common name	Binomial	Notes
Rock pigeon	Columba livia	introduced
Metallic pigeon	Columba vitiensis	extirpated, Lord Howe Island
White-headed pigeon	Columba leucomela	
Oriental turtle-dove	Streptopelia orientalis	vagrant
Barbary dove	Streptopelia risoria	introduced
Red collared-dove	Streptopelia tranquebarica	vagrant, Christmas Island
Spotted dove	Spilopelia chinensis	introduced
Laughing dove	Spilopelia senegalensis	introduced
Brown cuckoo-dove	Macropygia phasianella	
Common emerald dove	Chalcophaps indica	Christmas Island
Pacific emerald dove	Chalcophaps longirostris	
Stephan's dove	Chalcophaps stephani	vagrant
Norfolk ground dove	Alopecoenas norfolciensis	extinct, Norfolk Island
Common bronzewing	Phaps chalcoptera	
Brush bronzewing	Phaps elegans	
Flock bronzewing	Phaps histrionica	
Crested pigeon	Ocyphaps lophotes	
Spinifex pigeon	Geophaps plumifera	
Squatter pigeon	Geophaps scripta	
Partridge pigeon	Geophaps smithii	
Chestnut-quilled rock-pigeon	Petrophassa rufipennis	
White-quilled rock-pigeon	Petrophassa albipennis	
Wonga pigeon	Leucosarcia melanoleuca	
Diamond dove	Geopelia cuneata	
Peaceful dove	Geopelia placida	
Bar-shouldered dove	Geopelia humeralis	
Nicobar pigeon	Caloenas nicobarica	vagrant
Black-banded fruit-dove	Ptilinopus alligator	
Wompoo fruit-dove	Ptilinopus magnificus	
Orange-fronted fruit-dove	Ptilinopus aurantiifrons	vagrant
Superb fruit-dove	Ptilinopus superbus	
Rose-crowned fruit-dove	Ptilinopus regina	
Orange-bellied fruit-dove	Ptilinopus iozonus	vagrant, Torres Strait
Elegant imperial-pigeon	Ducula concinna	vagrant
Christmas Island imperial-pigeon	Ducula whartoni	Christmas Island
Collared imperial-pigeon	Ducula mullerii	
Torresian imperial-pigeon	Ducula spilorrhoa	
Topknot pigeon	Lopholaimus antarcticus	
New Zealand pigeon	Hemiphaga novaeseelandiae	extirpated, Norfolk Island

== Bustards ==
Order: Otidiformes Family: Otididae

1 species recorded [1 extant native]
Bustards are large terrestrial birds mainly associated with dry open country and steppes in the Old World. They are omnivorous and nest on the ground. They walk steadily on strong legs and big toes, pecking for food as they go. They have long broad wings with "fingered" wingtips and striking patterns in flight. Many have interesting mating displays.

Common name	Binomial	Notes
Australian bustard	Ardeotis australis	

== Cuckoos ==
Order: Cuculiformes Family: Cuculidae

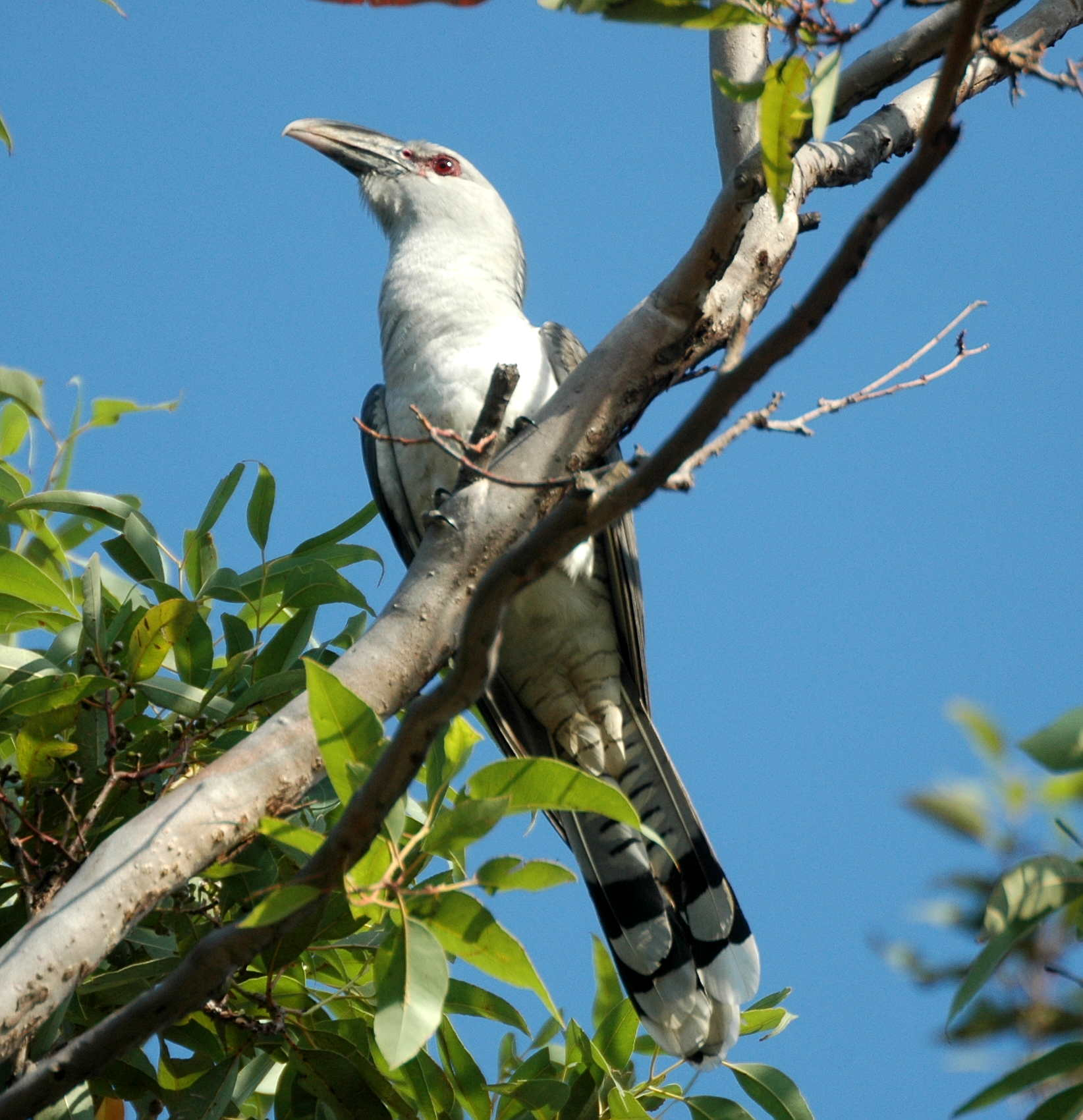
Channel-billed cuckoo

21 species recorded [14 extant native, 7 vagrant]
The family Cuculidae includes cuckoos, roadrunners and anis. These birds are of variable size with slender bodies, long tails and strong legs. The Old World cuckoos are brood parasites.

Common name	Binomial	Notes
Lesser coucal	Centropus bengalensis	vagrant, Ashmore Reef
Pheasant coucal	Centropus phasianinus	
Chestnut-winged cuckoo	Clamator coromandus	vagrant
Asian koel	Eudynamys scolopaceus	vagrant, Christmas, Barrow Island, WA & Cocos (Keeling) Islands
Pacific koel	Eudynamys orientalis	
Long-tailed koel	Urodynamis taitensis	vagrant, Lord Howe & Norfolk Island
Channel-billed cuckoo	Scythrops novaehollandiae	
Long-billed cuckoo	Chrysococcyx megarhynchus	
Horsfield's bronze-cuckoo	Chrysococcyx basalis	
Black-eared cuckoo	Chrysococcyx osculans	
Shining bronze-cuckoo	Chrysococcyx lucidus	
Little bronze-cuckoo	Chrysococcyx minutillus	
Pallid cuckoo	Cacomantis pallidus	
Chestnut-breasted cuckoo	Cacomantis castaneiventris	
Fan-tailed cuckoo	Cacomantis flabelliformis	
Brush cuckoo	Cacomantis variolosus	
Square-tailed drongo-cuckoo	Surniculus lugubris	vagrant
Large hawk-cuckoo	Hierococcyx sparverioides	vagrant, Christmas Island
Hodgson's hawk-cuckoo	Hierococcyx nisicolor	vagrant, Cocos (Keeling) Islands
Indian cuckoo	Cuculus micropterus	vagrant, Cocos (Keeling) Islands
Oriental cuckoo	Cuculus optatus	

== Frogmouths ==
Order: Caprimulgiformes Family: Podargidae

3 species recorded [3 extant native]
The frogmouths are a distinctive group of small nocturnal birds related to swifts found from India across southern Asia to Australia. Three species are found in Australia.

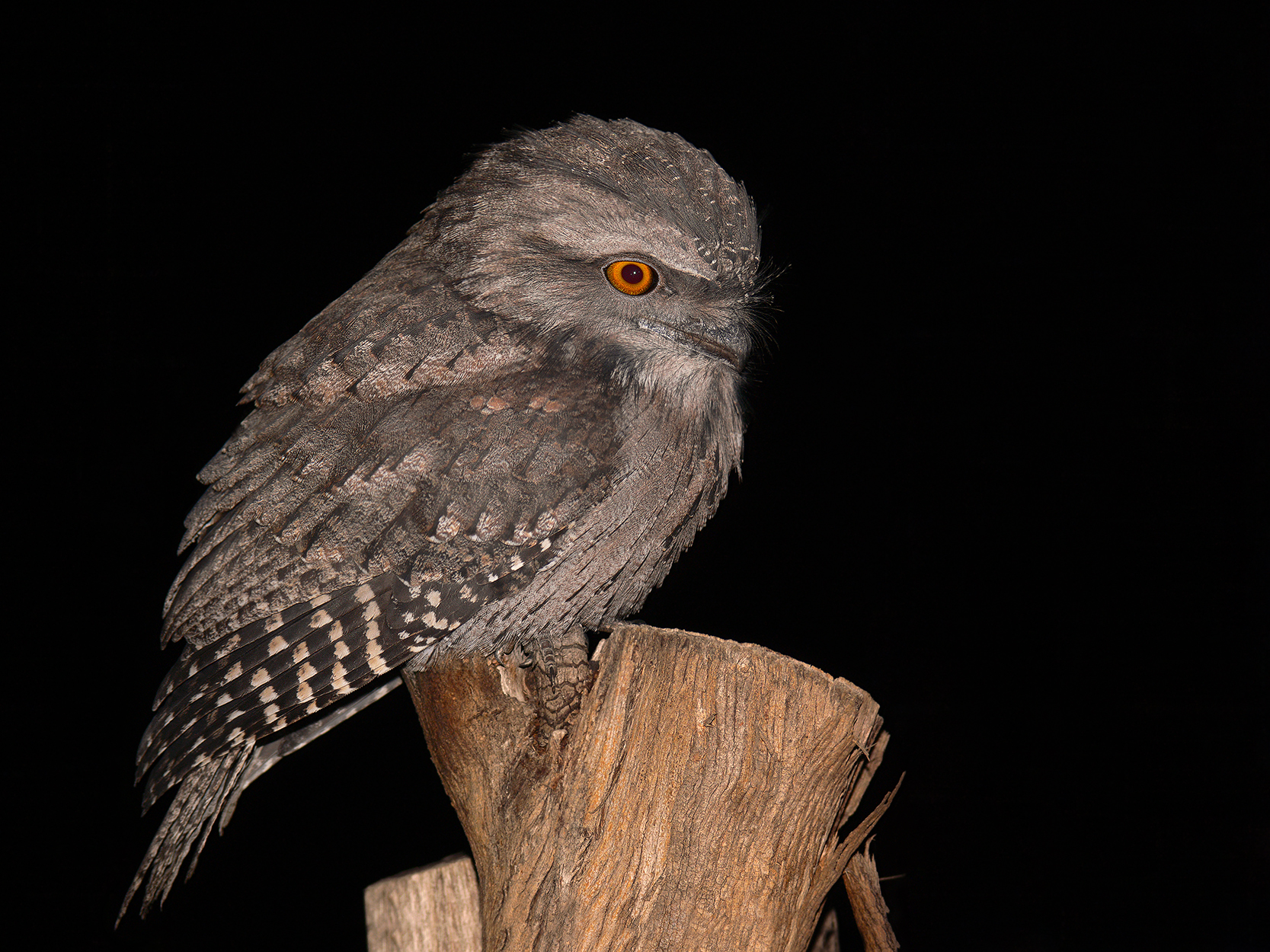
Tawny frogmouth

Common name	Binomial	Notes
Tawny frogmouth	Podargus strigoides	
Marbled frogmouth	Podargus ocellatus	
Papuan frogmouth	Podargus papuensis	

== Nightjars and allies ==
Order: Caprimulgiformes Family: Caprimulgidae

5 species recorded [3 extant native, 2 vagrant]
Nightjars are medium-sized nocturnal birds that usually nest on the ground. They have long wings, short legs and very short bills. Most have small feet, of little use for walking, and long pointed wings. Their soft plumage is camouflaged to resemble bark or leaves.

Common name	Binomial	Notes
Spotted nightjar	Eurostopodus argus	
White-throated nightjar	Eurostopodus mystacalis	
Grey nightjar	Caprimulgus jotaka	vagrant, Ashmore Reef
Large-tailed nightjar	Caprimulgus macrurus	
Savanna nightjar	Caprimulgus affinis	vagrant, Christmas Island

== Owlet-nightjars ==
Order: Caprimulgiformes Family: Aegothelidae

1 species recorded [1 extant native]
The owlet-nightjars are a distinctive group of small nocturnal birds related to swifts found from the Maluku Islands and New Guinea to Australia and New Caledonia. One species is found in Australia.

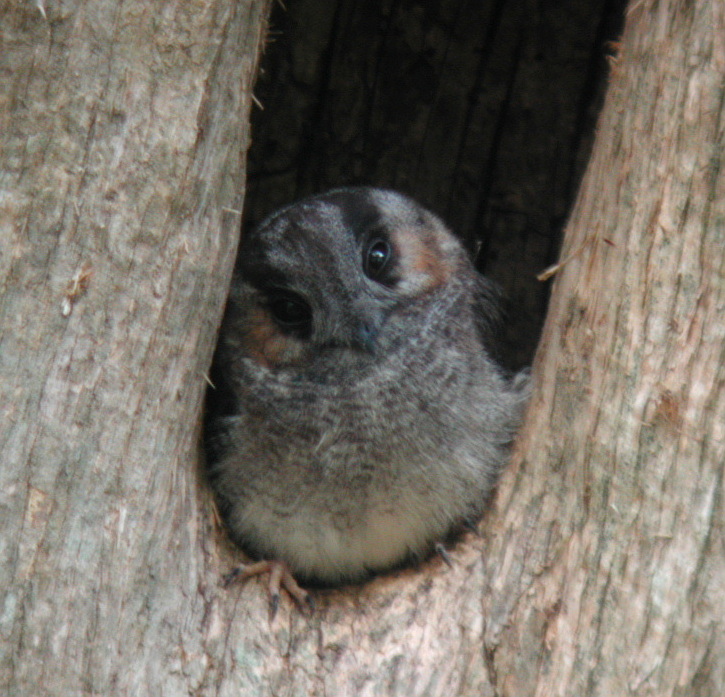
Australian owlet-nightjar

Common name	Binomial	Notes
Australian owlet-nightjar	Aegotheles cristatus	

== Swifts ==
Order: Caprimulgiformes Family: Apodidae

11 species recorded [4 extant native, 7 vagrant]
Swifts are small birds which spend the majority of their lives flying. These birds have very short legs and never settle voluntarily on the ground, perching instead only on vertical surfaces. Many swifts have long swept-back wings which resemble a crescent or boomerang. Nine species recorded in Australian territory, five of which are vagrants.

Common name	Binomial	Notes
Papuan spine-tailed swift	Mearnsia novaeguineae	vagrant, Torres Strait
White-throated needletail	Hirundapus caudacutus	
Christmas Island swiftlet	Collocalia natalis	Christmas Island
Glossy swiftlet	Collocalia esculenta	vagrant
Australian swiftlet	Aerodramus terraereginae	
Uniform swiftlet	Aerodramus vanikorensis	vagrant
Mossy-nest swiftlet	Aerodramus salangana	vagrant
White-nest swiftlet	Aerodramus fuciphagus	vagrant
Pacific swift	Apus pacificus	
Common swift	Apus apus	vagrant
House swift	Apus affinis	vagrant

== Rails, gallinules, and coots ==
Order: Gruiformes Family: Rallidae

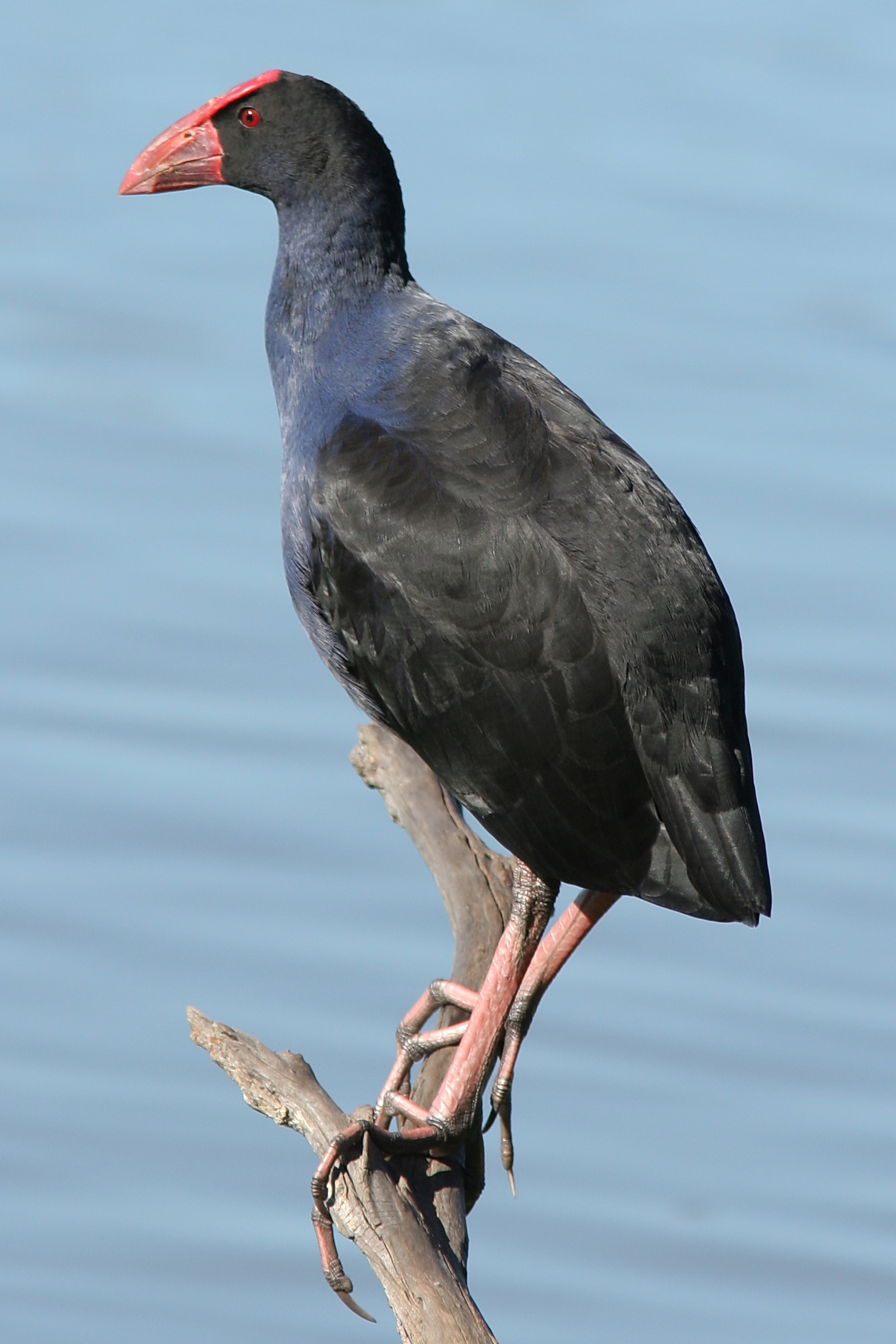
Australasian swamphen

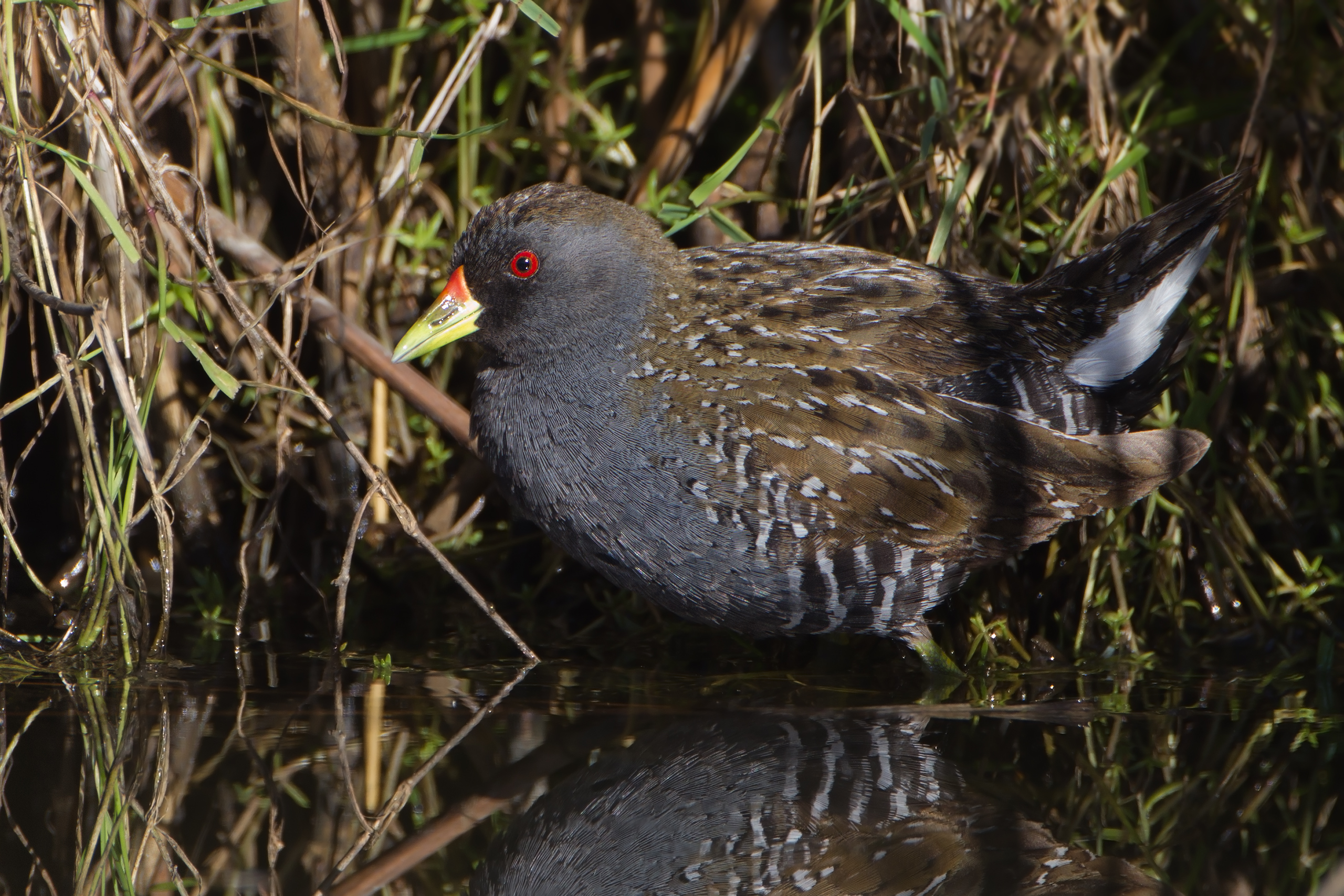
Australian spotted crake

24 species recorded [15 extant native, 7 vagrant, 1 extirpated, 1 extinct native]
Rallidae is a large family of small to medium-sized birds which includes the rails, crakes, coots and gallinules. Typically they inhabit dense vegetation in damp environments near lakes, swamps or rivers. In general they are shy and secretive birds, making them difficult to observe. Most species have strong legs and long toes which are well adapted to soft uneven surfaces. They tend to have short, rounded wings and to be weak fliers.

Common name	Binomial	Notes
Corn crake	Crex crex	vagrant
Lewin's rail	Lewinia pectoralis	
Chestnut rail	Gallirallus castaneoventris	
Weka	Gallirallus australis	extirpated introduced population on Macquarie Island
Lord Howe woodhen	Gallirallus sylvestris	Lord Howe Island
Buff-banded rail	Gallirallus philippensis	
Black-tailed nativehen	Tribonyx ventralis	
Tasmanian nativehen	Tribonyx mortierii	
Spotted crake	Porzana porzana	vagrant
Australian crake	Porzana fluminea	
Eurasian moorhen	Gallinula chloropus	vagrant, Cocos (Keeling) Islands
Dusky moorhen	Gallinula tenebrosa	
Eurasian coot	Fulica atra	
Australasian swamphen	Porphyrio melanotus	
Lord Howe swamphen	Porphyrio albus	extinct, Lord Howe Island
Watercock	Gallicrex cinerea	vagrant, Christmas Island, Cocos (Keeling) Islands & Ashmore Reef
White-breasted waterhen	Amaurornis phoenicurus	vagrant, Christmas Island, Cocos (Keeling) Islands
Pale-vented bush-hen	Amaurornis moluccana	
White-browed crake	Poliolimnas cinereus	
Red-necked crake	Rallina tricolor	
Red-legged crake	Rallina fasciata	vagrant
Ruddy-breasted crake	Zapornia fusca	vagrant, Christmas Island
Baillon's crake	Zapornia pusilla	
Spotless crake	Zapornia tabuensis	

== Cranes ==
Order: Gruiformes Family: Gruidae

2 species recorded [2 extant native]
Cranes are large, long-legged and long-necked birds. Unlike the similar-looking but unrelated herons, cranes fly with necks outstretched, not pulled back. Most have elaborate and noisy courting displays or "dances".

Common name	Binomial	Notes
Sarus crane	Antigone antigone	
Brolga	Antigone rubicunda	

== Sheathbills ==
Order: Charadriiformes Family: Chionidae

1 species recorded [1 extant native]
The sheathbills are scavengers of the Antarctic regions. They have white plumage and look plump and dove-like but are believed to be similar to the ancestors of the modern gulls and terns.

Common name	Binomial	Notes
Black-faced sheathbill	Chionis minor	Heard Island; mainland vagrant

== Thick-knees ==
Order: Charadriiformes Family: Burhinidae

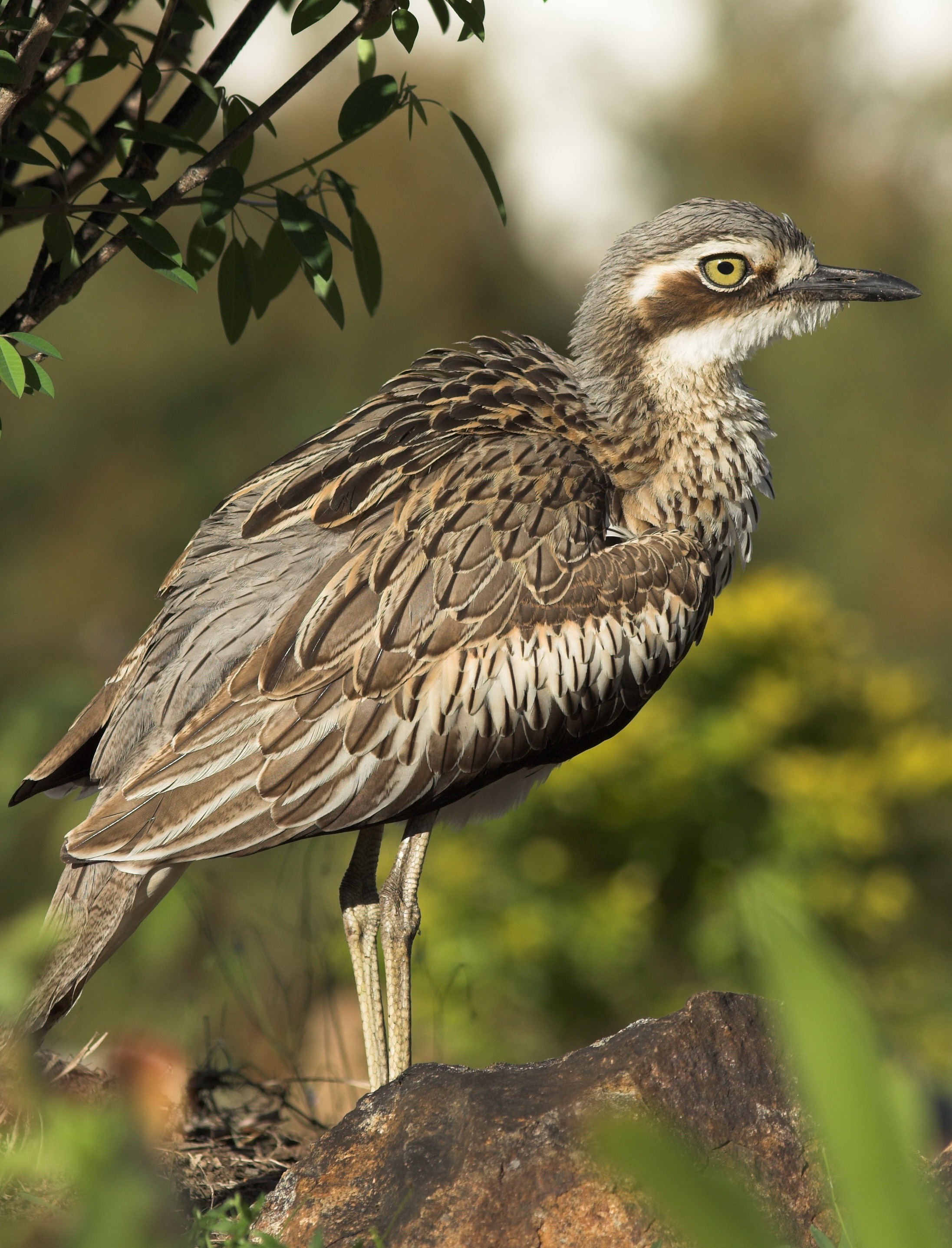
Bush stone-curlew

2 species recorded [2 extant native]
The thick-knees are a group of largely tropical waders in the family Burhinidae. They are found worldwide within the tropical zone, with some species also breeding in temperate Europe and Australia. They are medium to large waders with strong black or yellow-black bills, large yellow eyes and cryptic plumage. Despite being classed as waders, most species have a preference for arid or semi-arid habitats.

Common name	Binomial	Notes
Bush thick-knee	Burhinus grallarius	
Beach thick-knee	Esacus magnirostris	

== Stilts and avocets ==
Order: Charadriiformes Family: Recurvirostridae

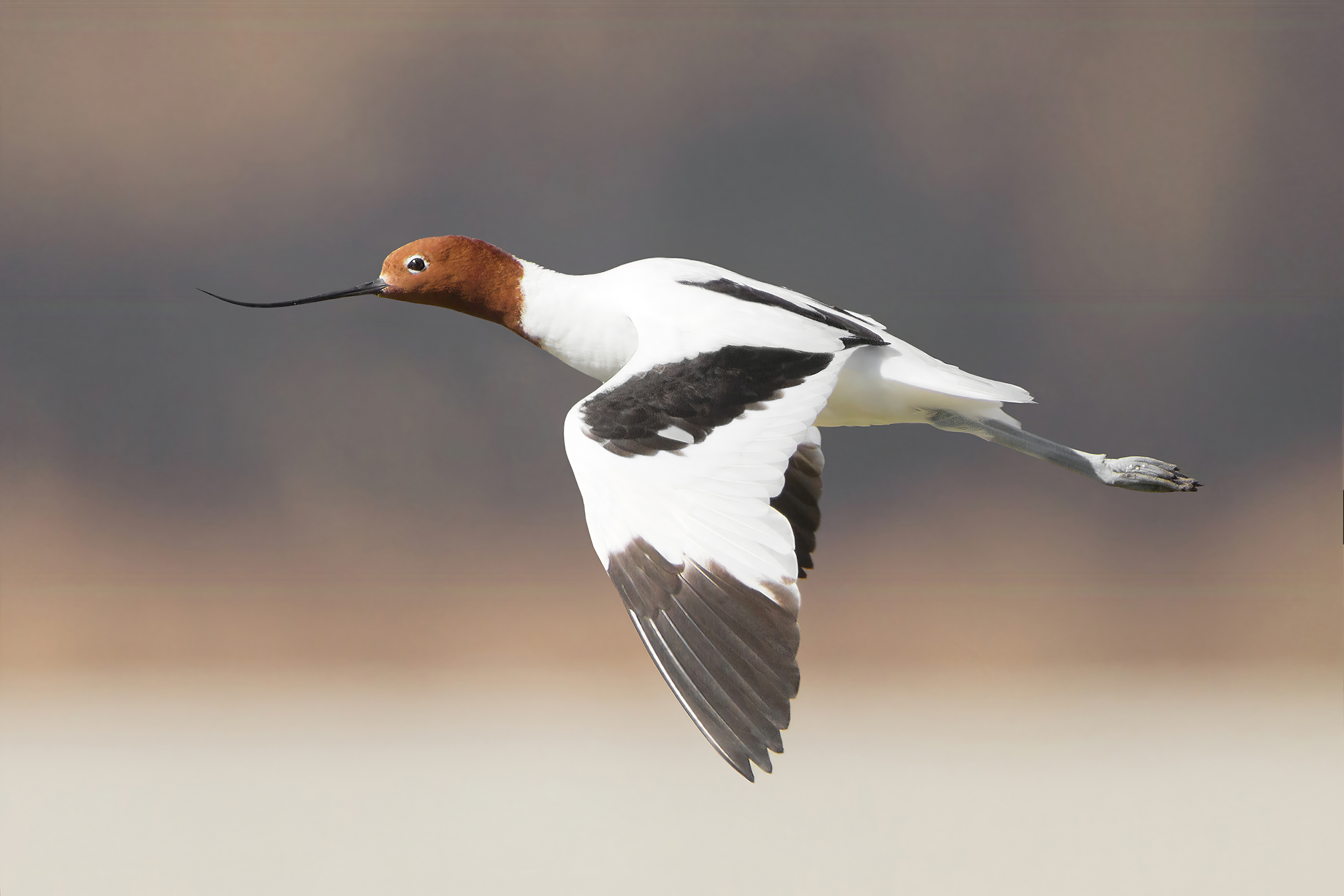
Red-necked avocet

3 species recorded [3 extant native]
Recurvirostridae is a family of large wading birds, which includes the avocets and stilts. The avocets have long legs and long up-curved bills. The stilts have extremely long legs and long, thin straight bills.

Common name	Binomial	Notes
Pied stilt	Himantopus leucocephalus	
Banded stilt	Cladorhynchus leucocephalus	
Red-necked avocet	Recurvirostra novaehollandiae	

== Oystercatchers ==
Order: Charadriiformes Family: Haematopodidae

3 species recorded [2 extant native, 1 vagrant]
The oystercatchers are large and noisy plover-like birds, with strong bills used for smashing or prising open molluscs.

Common name	Binomial	Notes
Pied oystercatcher	Haematopus longirostris	
South Island oystercatcher	Haematopus finschi	vagrant
Sooty oystercatcher	Haematopus fuliginosus	

== Plovers and lapwings ==
Order: Charadriiformes Family: Charadriidae

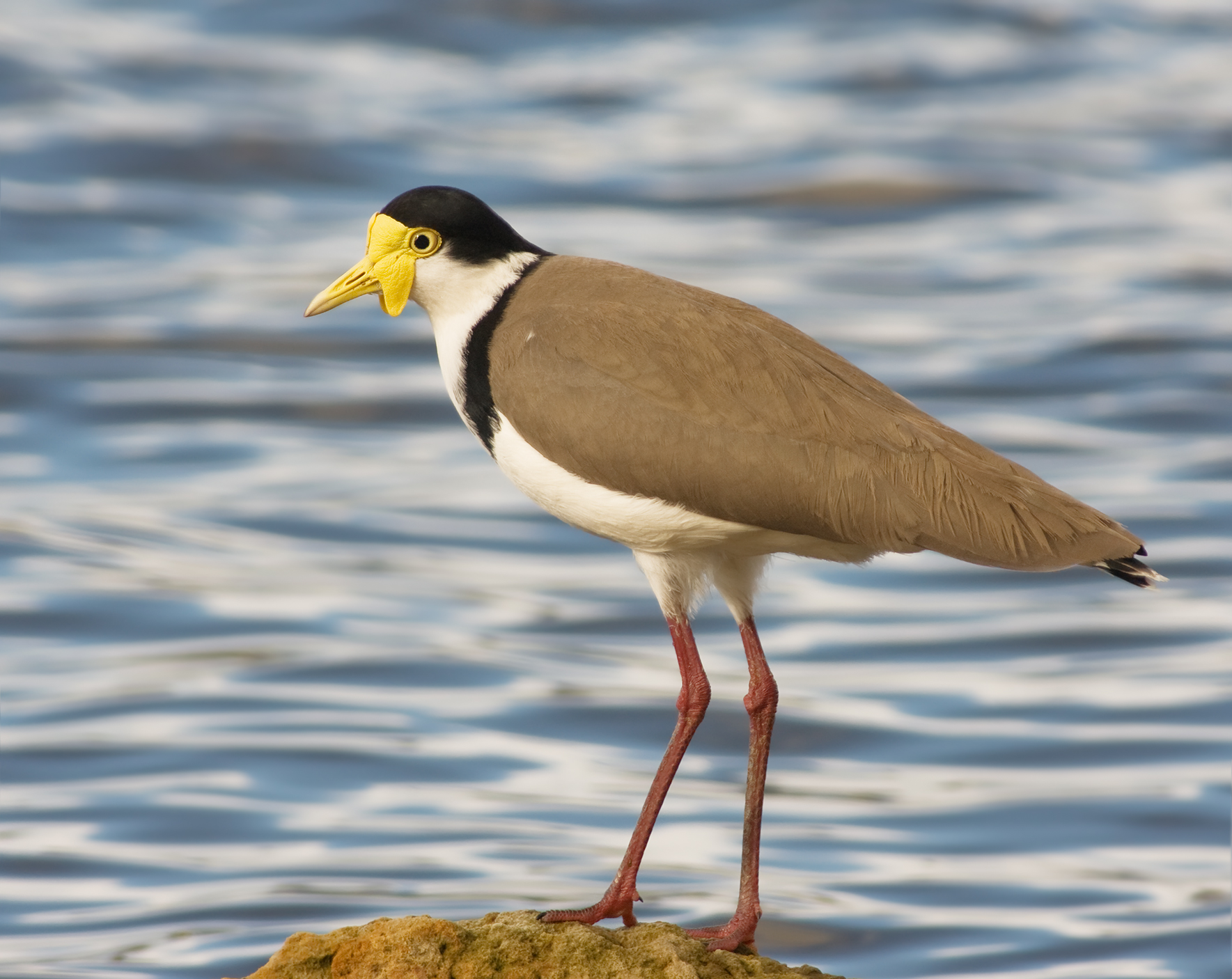
Masked lapwing

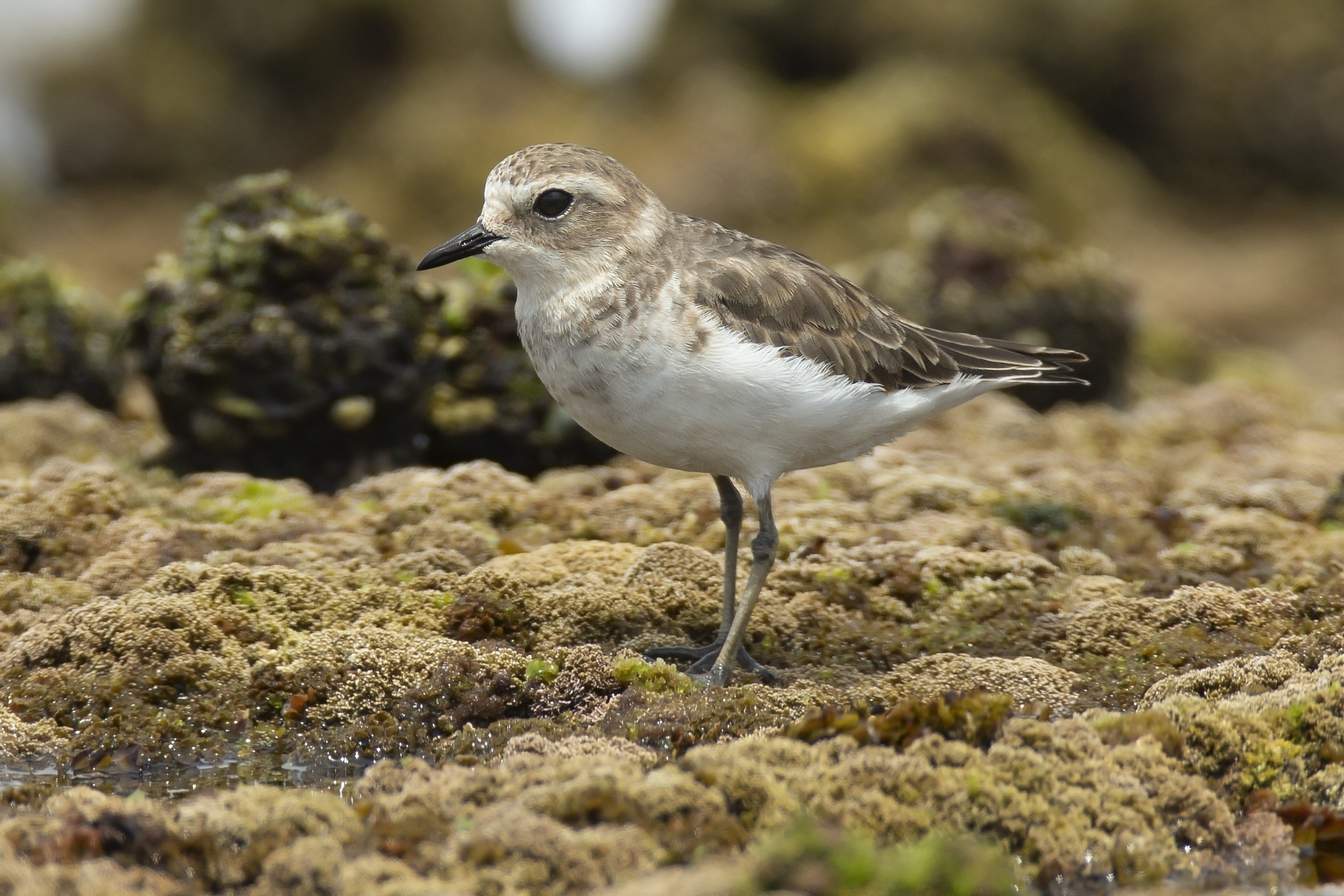
Double-banded plover non-breeding plumage

21 species recorded [14 extant native, 7 vagrant]
The family Charadriidae includes the plovers, dotterels and lapwings. They are small to medium-sized birds with compact bodies, short, thick necks and long, usually pointed, wings. They are found in open country worldwide, mostly in habitats near water.

Common name	Binomial	Notes
Black-bellied plover	Pluvialis squatarola	
American golden-plover	Pluvialis dominica	vagrant
Pacific golden-plover	Pluvialis fulva	
Grey-headed lapwing	Vanellus cinereus	vagrant
Banded lapwing	Vanellus tricolor	
Masked lapwing	Vanellus miles	
Siberian sand plover	Anarhynchus mongolus	
Tibetan sand plover	Anarhynchus atrifrons	vagrant
Greater sand-plover	Charadrius leschenaultii	
Caspian plover	Charadrius asiaticus	vagrant
Double-banded plover	Charadrius bicinctus	
Red-capped plover	Charadrius ruficapillus	
Kentish plover	Charadrius alexandrinus	vagrant
Common ringed plover	Charadrius hiaticula	vagrant
Semipalmated plover	Charadrius semipalmatus	vagrant
Little ringed plover	Charadrius dubius	
Oriental plover	Charadrius veredus	
Red-kneed dotterel	Erythrogonys cinctus	
Hooded plover	Thinornis cucullatus	
Black-fronted dotterel	Elseyornis melanops	
Inland dotterel	Peltohyas australis	

== Plains-wanderer ==
Order: Charadriiformes Family: Pedionomidae

1 species recorded [1 extant native]
The plains-wanderer is a quail-like ground bird. They are excellent camouflagers, and will first hide at any disturbance. If they're approached too close, they will run as opposed to flying, which they are very poor at.

Common name	Binomial	Notes
Plains-wanderer	Pedionomus torquatus	

== Painted-snipe ==
Order: Charadriiformes Family: Rostratulidae

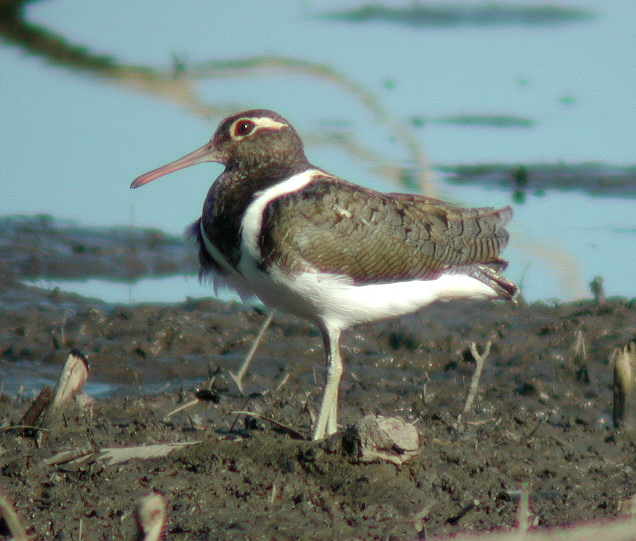
Australian painted-snipe

1 species recorded [1 extant native]
Painted-snipe are short-legged, long-billed birds similar in shape to the true snipes, but more brightly coloured.

Common name	Binomial	Notes
Australian painted-snipe	Rostratula australis	

== Jacanas ==
Order: Charadriiformes Family: Jacanidae

2 species recorded [1 extant native, 1 vagrant]
The jacanas are a group of waders found throughout the tropics. They are identifiable by their huge feet and claws which enable them to walk on floating vegetation in the shallow lakes that are their preferred habitat.

Common name	Binomial	Notes
Comb-crested jacana	Irediparra gallinacea	
Pheasant-tailed jacana	Hydrophasianus chirurgus	vagrant

== Sandpipers and allies ==
Order: Charadriiformes Family: Scolopacidae

47 species recorded [29 extant native, 18 vagrant]
Scolopacidae is a large diverse family of small to medium-sized shorebirds including the sandpipers, curlews, godwits, shanks, tattlers, woodcocks, snipes, dowitchers, and phalaropes. The majority of these species eat small invertebrates picked out of the mud or soil. Variation in length of legs and bills enables multiple species to feed in the same habitat, particularly on the coast, without direct competition for food.

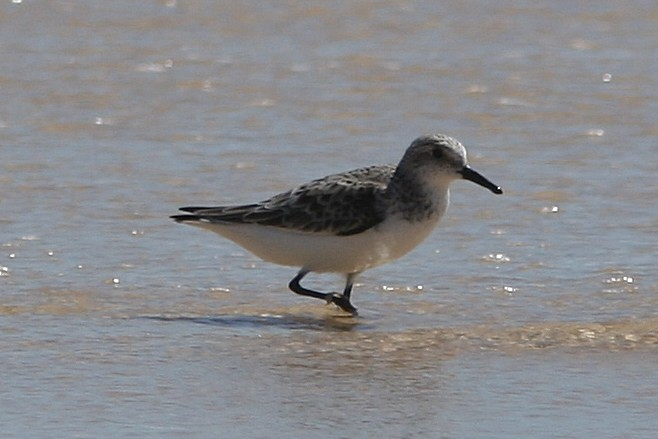
Sanderling

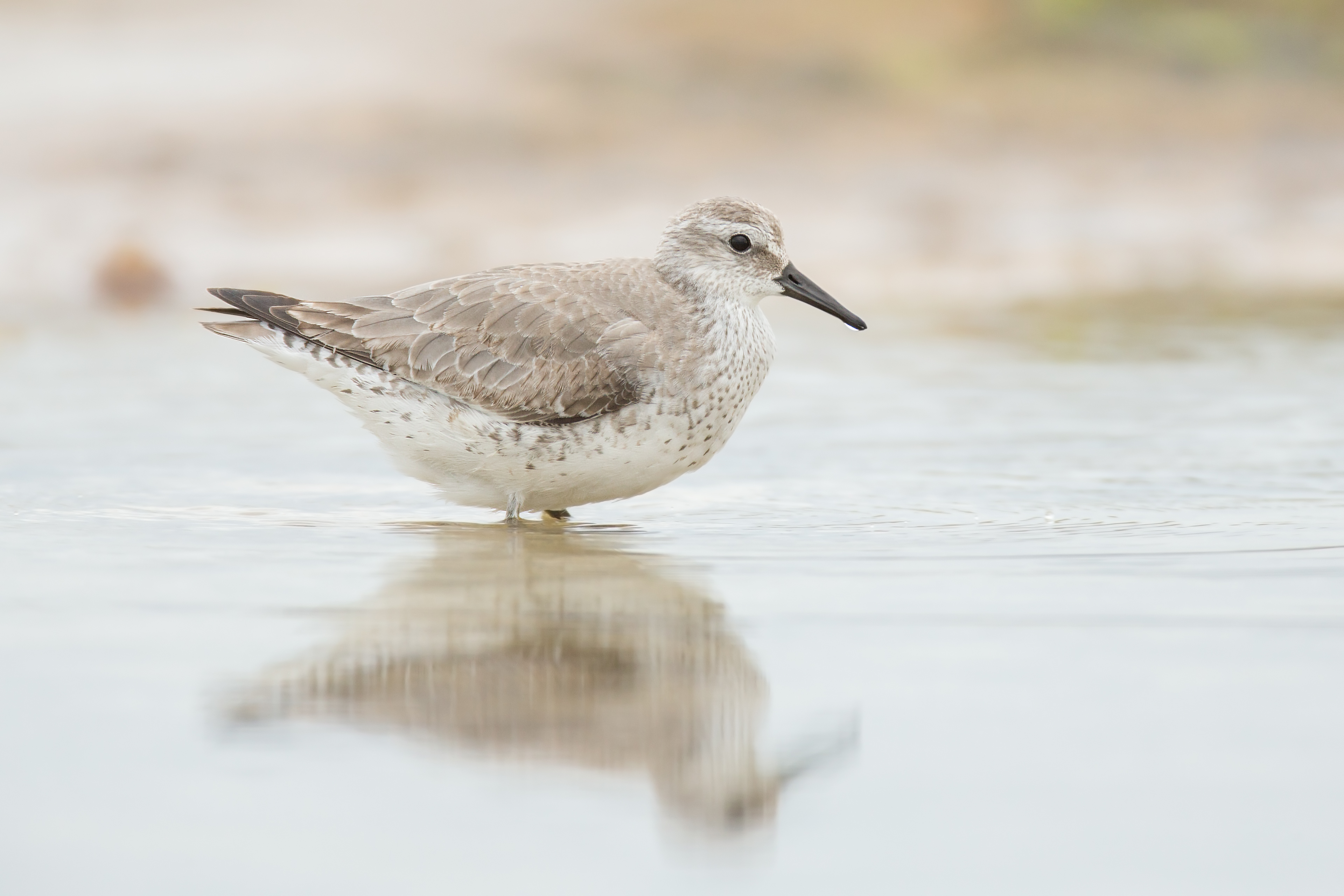
Red knot

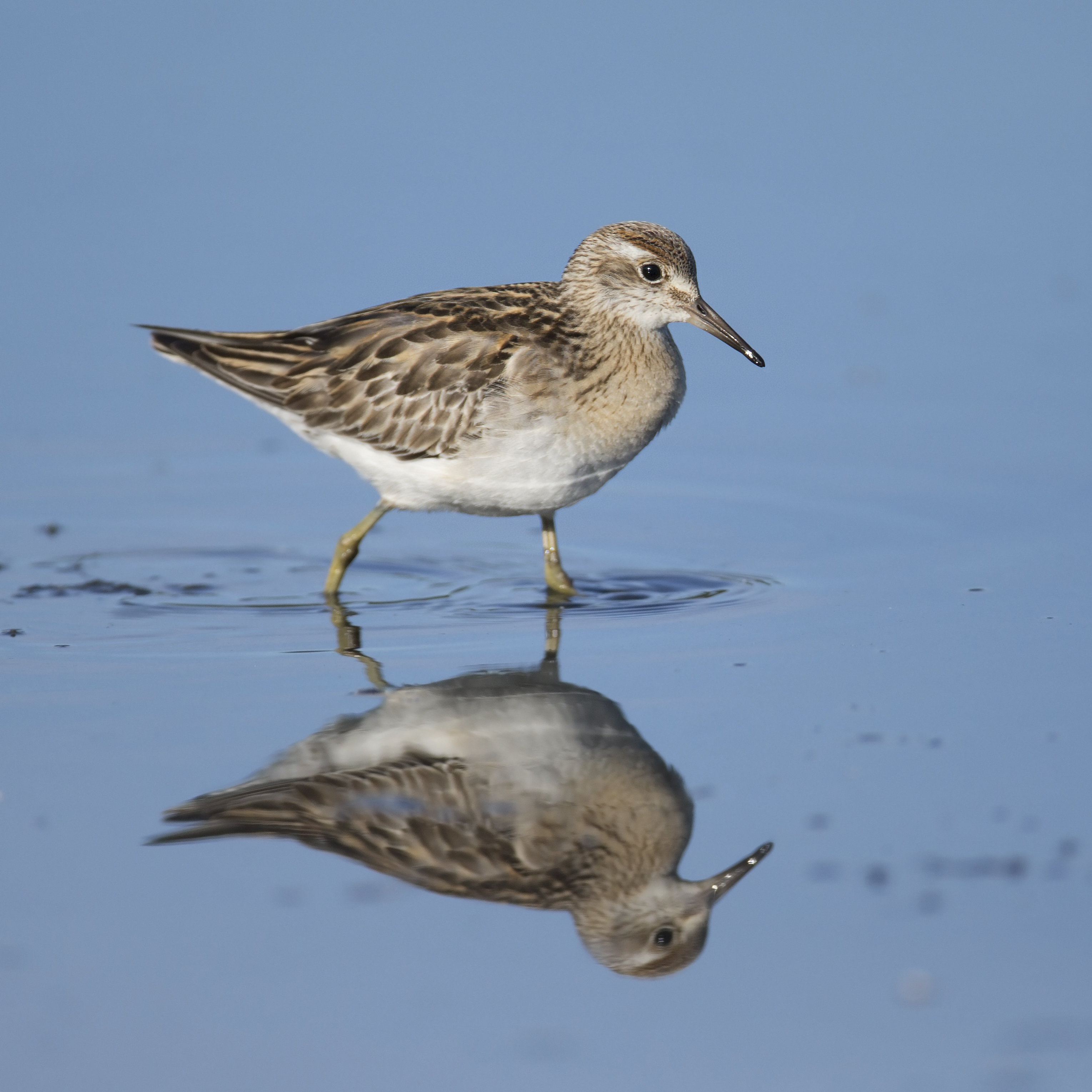
Sharp-tailed sandpiper

Common name	Binomial	Notes
Upland sandpiper	Bartramia longicauda	vagrant
Eurasian whimbrel	Numenius phaeopus	
Little curlew	Numenius minutus	
Far Eastern curlew	Numenius madagascariensis	
Eurasian curlew	Numenius arquata	vagrant
Bar-tailed godwit	Limosa lapponica	
Black-tailed godwit	Limosa limosa	
Hudsonian godwit	Limosa haemastica	vagrant
Ruddy turnstone	Arenaria interpres	
Great knot	Calidris tenuirostris	
Red knot	Calidris canutus	
Ruff	Calidris pugnax	
Broad-billed sandpiper	Calidris falcinellus	
Sharp-tailed sandpiper	Calidris acuminata	
Stilt sandpiper	Calidris himantopus	vagrant
Curlew sandpiper	Calidris ferruginea	
Temminck's stint	Calidris temminckii	vagrant
Long-toed stint	Calidris subminuta	
Red-necked stint	Calidris ruficollis	
Sanderling	Calidris alba	
Dunlin	Calidris alpina	vagrant
Baird's sandpiper	Calidris bairdii	vagrant
Little stint	Calidris minuta	vagrant
White-rumped sandpiper	Calidris fuscicollis	vagrant
Buff-breasted sandpiper	Calidris subruficollis	vagrant
Pectoral sandpiper	Calidris melanotos	
Asian dowitcher	Limnodromus semipalmatus	
Short-billed dowitcher	Limnodromus griseus	vagrant
Long-billed dowitcher	Limnodromus scolopaceus	vagrant
Latham's snipe	Gallinago hardwickii	
Pin-tailed snipe	Gallinago stenura	
Swinhoe's snipe	Gallinago megala	
Terek sandpiper	Xenus cinereus	
Wilson's phalarope	Phalaropus tricolor	vagrant
Red-necked phalarope	Phalaropus lobatus	
Red phalarope	Phalaropus fulicarius	vagrant
Common sandpiper	Actitis hypoleucos	
Green sandpiper	Tringa ochropus	vagrant
Grey-tailed tattler	Tringa brevipes	
Wandering tattler	Tringa incana	
Spotted redshank	Tringa erythropus	vagrant
Common greenshank	Tringa nebularia	
Nordmann's greenshank	Tringa guttifer	vagrant
Lesser yellowlegs	Tringa flavipes	vagrant
Marsh sandpiper	Tringa stagnatilis	
Wood sandpiper	Tringa glareola	
Common redshank	Tringa totanus	

== Buttonquail ==
Order: Charadriiformes Family: Turnicidae

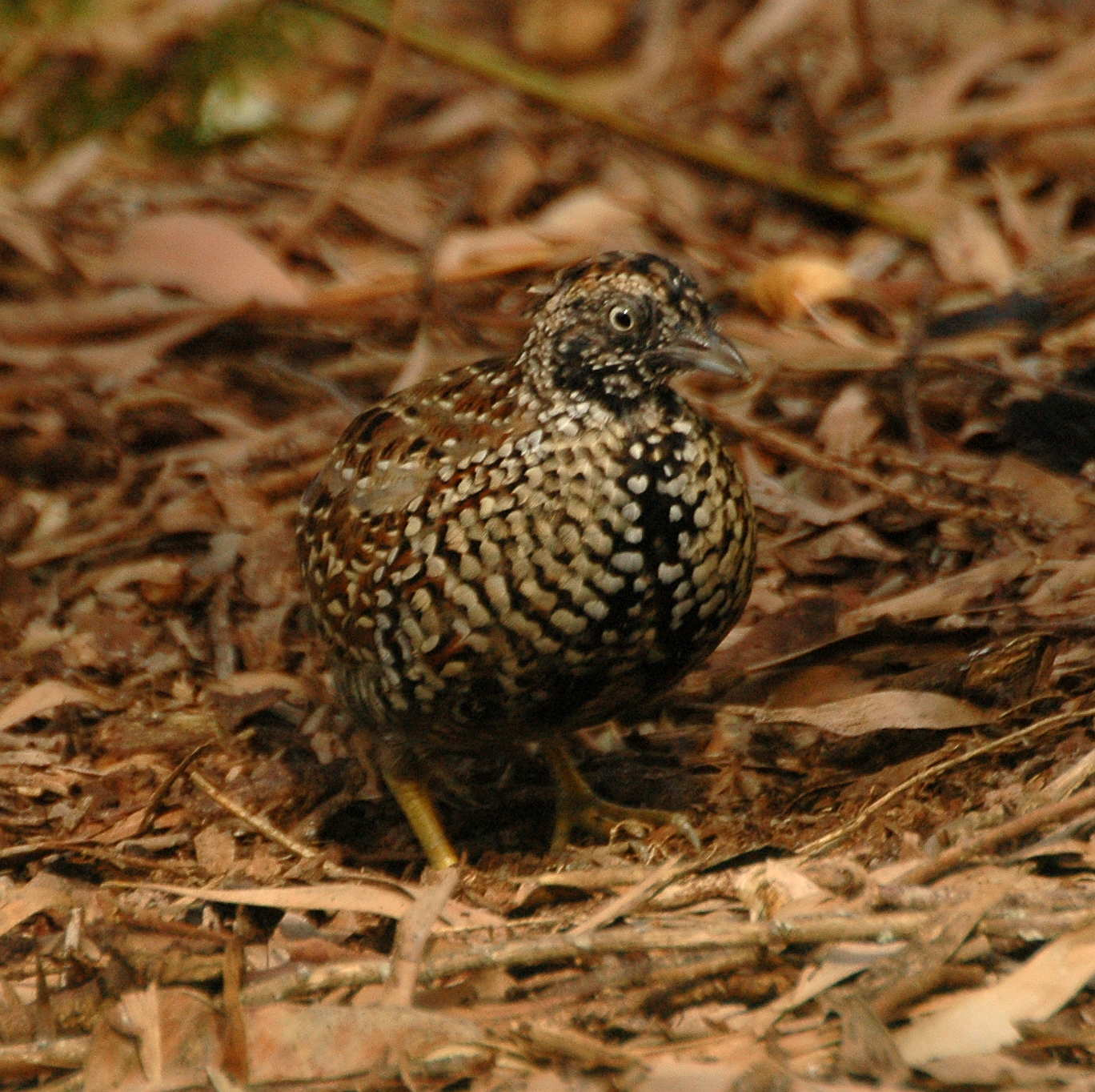
Black-breasted buttonquail

7 species recorded [7 extant native]
The buttonquails are small, drab, running birds which resemble the true quails. The female is the brighter of the sexes and initiates courtship. The male incubates the eggs and tends the young.

Common name	Binomial	Notes
Red-backed buttonquail	Turnix maculosus	
Black-breasted buttonquail	Turnix melanogaster	
Chestnut-backed buttonquail	Turnix castanotus	
Buff-breasted buttonquail	Turnix olivii	
Painted buttonquail	Turnix varius	
Red-chested buttonquail	Turnix pyrrhothorax	
Little buttonquail	Turnix velox	

== Pratincoles and coursers ==
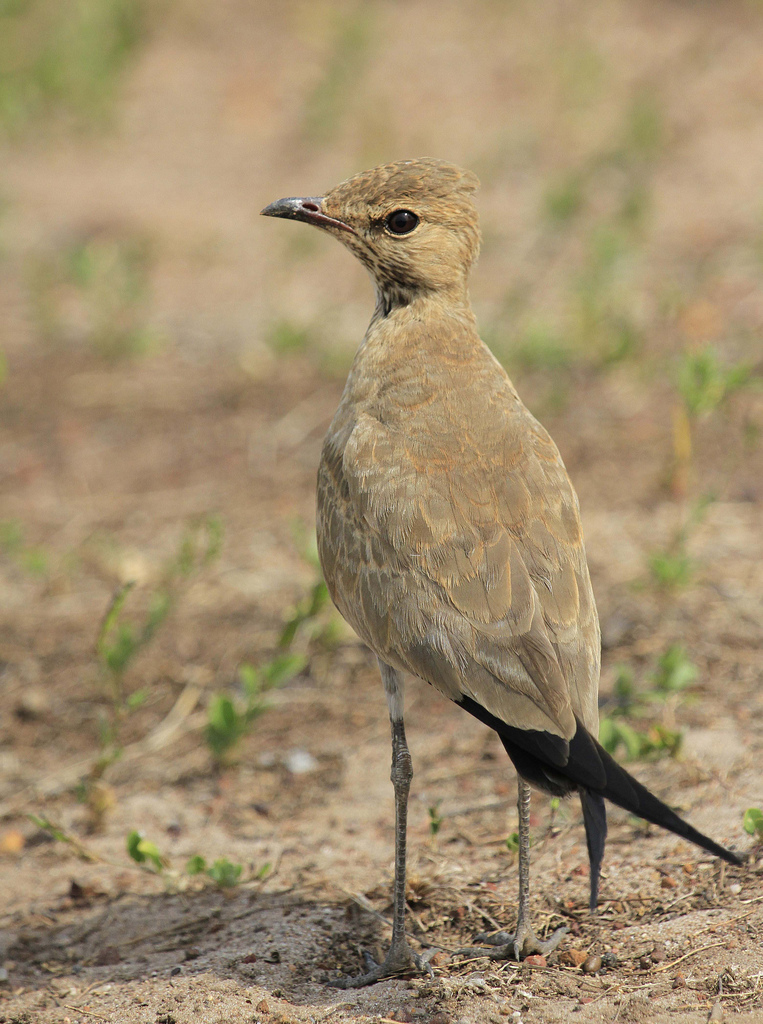
Australian pratincole at Fogg Dam in the Northern Territory

Order: Charadriiformes Family: Glareolidae

3 species recorded [2 extant native, 1 vagrant]
Glareolidae is a family of wading birds comprising the pratincoles, which have short legs, long pointed wings, and long forked tails, and the coursers, which have long legs, short wings, and long, pointed bills which curve downwards.

Common name	Binomial	Notes
Australian pratincole	Stiltia isabella	
Collared pratincole	Glareola pratincola	vagrant
Oriental pratincole	Glareola maldivarum	

== Skuas and jaegers ==
Order: Charadriiformes Family: Stercorariidae

5 species recorded [5 extant native]
The family Stercorariidae are, in general, medium to large birds, typically with grey or brown plumage, often with white markings on the wings. They nest on the ground in temperate and arctic regions and are long-distance migrants.

Common name	Binomial	Notes
South polar skua	Stercorarius maccormicki	vagrant
Brown skua	Stercorarius antarcticus	
Pomarine jaeger	Stercorarius pomarinus	
Parasitic jaeger	Stercorarius parasiticus	
Long-tailed jaeger	Stercorarius longicauda	vagrant

== Gulls, terns, and skimmers ==
Order: Charadriiformes Family: Laridae

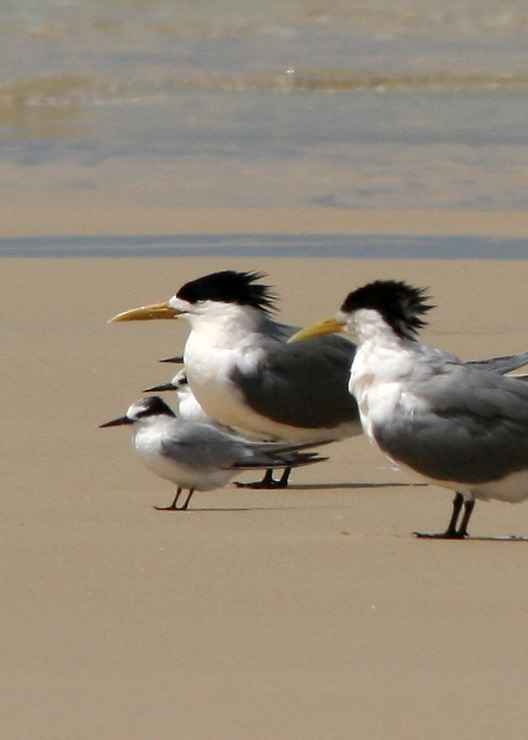
Little tern with crested terns

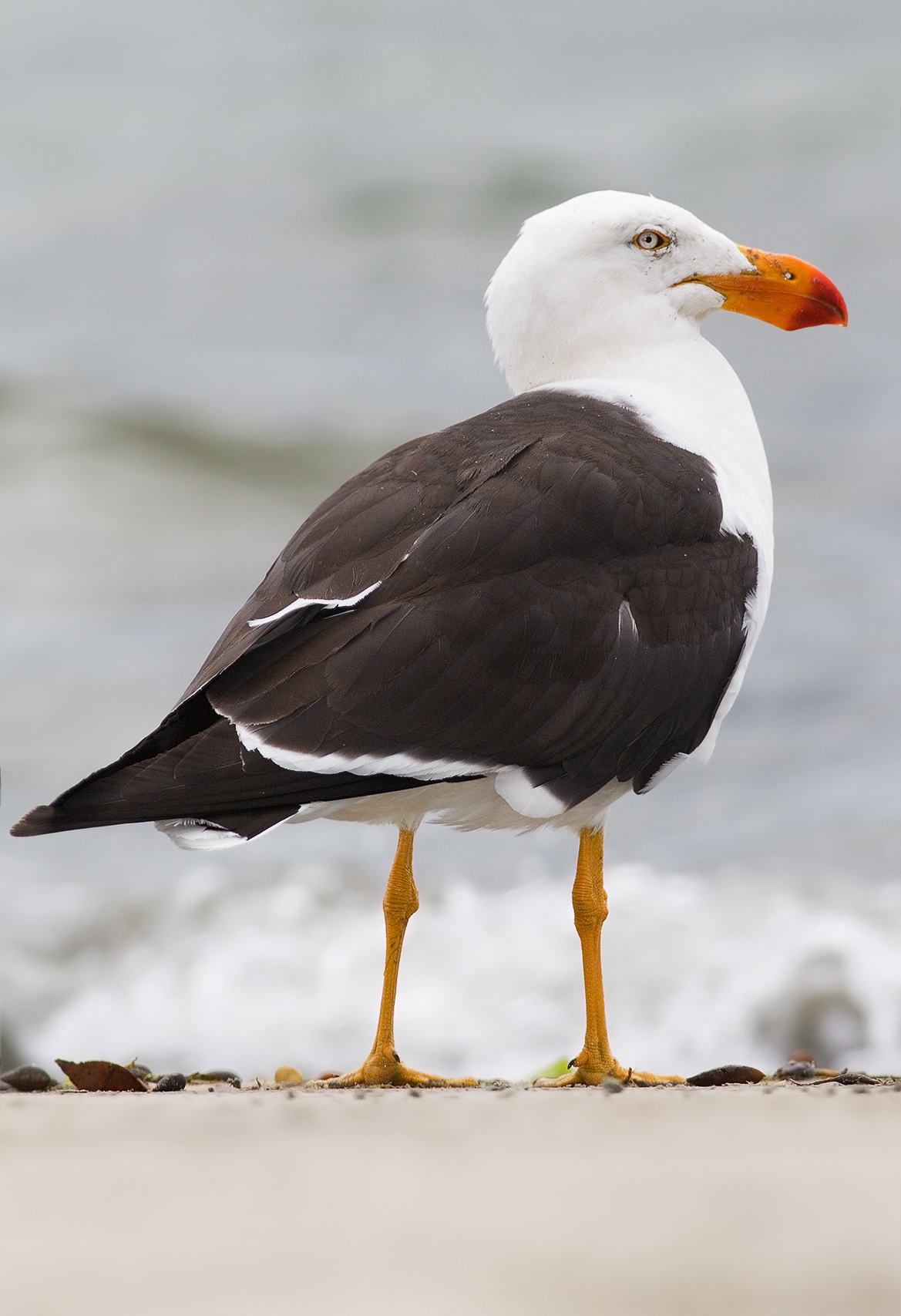
Pacific gull

39 species recorded [26 extant native, 13 vagrant]
Laridae is a family of medium to large seabirds, the gulls, terns, and skimmers. Gulls are typically grey or white, often with black markings on the head or wings. They have stout, longish bills and webbed feet. Terns are a group of generally medium to large seabirds typically with grey or white plumage, often with black markings on the head. Most terns hunt fish by diving but some pick insects off the surface of fresh water. Terns are generally long-lived birds, with several species known to live in excess of 30 years. Skimmers are a small family of tropical tern-like birds. They have an elongated lower mandible which they use to feed by flying low over the water surface and skimming the water for small fish.

Common name	Binomial	Notes
Sabine's gull	Xema sabini	vagrant
Silver gull	Chroicocephalus novaehollandiae	
Black-headed gull	Chroicocephalus ridibundus	vagrant
Laughing gull	Leucophaeus atricilla	vagrant
Franklin's gull	Leucophaeus pipixcan	vagrant
Black-tailed gull	Larus crassirostris	vagrant
Pacific gull	Larus pacificus	
Mew gull	Larus canus	vagrant, Christmas Island
Lesser black-backed gull	Larus fuscus	vagrant, Cocos (Keeling) Islands & possibly mainland
Slaty-backed gull	Larus schistisagus	vagrant
Kelp gull	Larus dominicanus	
Brown noddy	Anous stolidus	
Black noddy	Anous minutus	
Lesser noddy	Anous tenuirostris	
Grey noddy	Anous albivitta	
Blue-grey noddy	Anous ceruleus	
White tern	Gygis alba	Lord Howe, Norfolk & Cocos (Keeling) Islands; mainland vagrant
Sooty tern	Onychoprion fuscata	
Grey-backed tern	Onychoprion lunatus	vagrant
Bridled tern	Onychoprion anaethetus	
Aleutian tern	Onychoprion aleuticus	vagrant
Little tern	Sternula albifrons	
Australian fairy tern	Sternula nereis	
Saunders's tern	Sternula saundersi	Cocos (Keeling) Islands
Australian tern	Gelochelidon macrotarsa	
Gull-billed tern	Gelochelidon nilotica	
Caspian tern	Hydroprogne caspia	
Black tern	Chlidonias niger	vagrant
White-winged tern	Chlidonias leucopterus	
Whiskered tern	Chlidonias hybrida	
Black-fronted tern	Chlidonias albostriatus	vagrant
Roseate tern	Sterna dougallii	
White-fronted tern	Sterna striata	
Black-naped tern	Sterna sumatrana	
Common tern	Sterna hirundo	
Arctic tern	Sterna paradisaea	vagrant
Antarctic tern	Sterna vittata	Macquarie & Heard Island; mainland vagrant
Greater crested tern	Thalasseus bergii	
Lesser crested tern	Thalasseus bengalensis	

== Tropicbirds ==
Order: Phaethontiformes Family: Phaethontidae

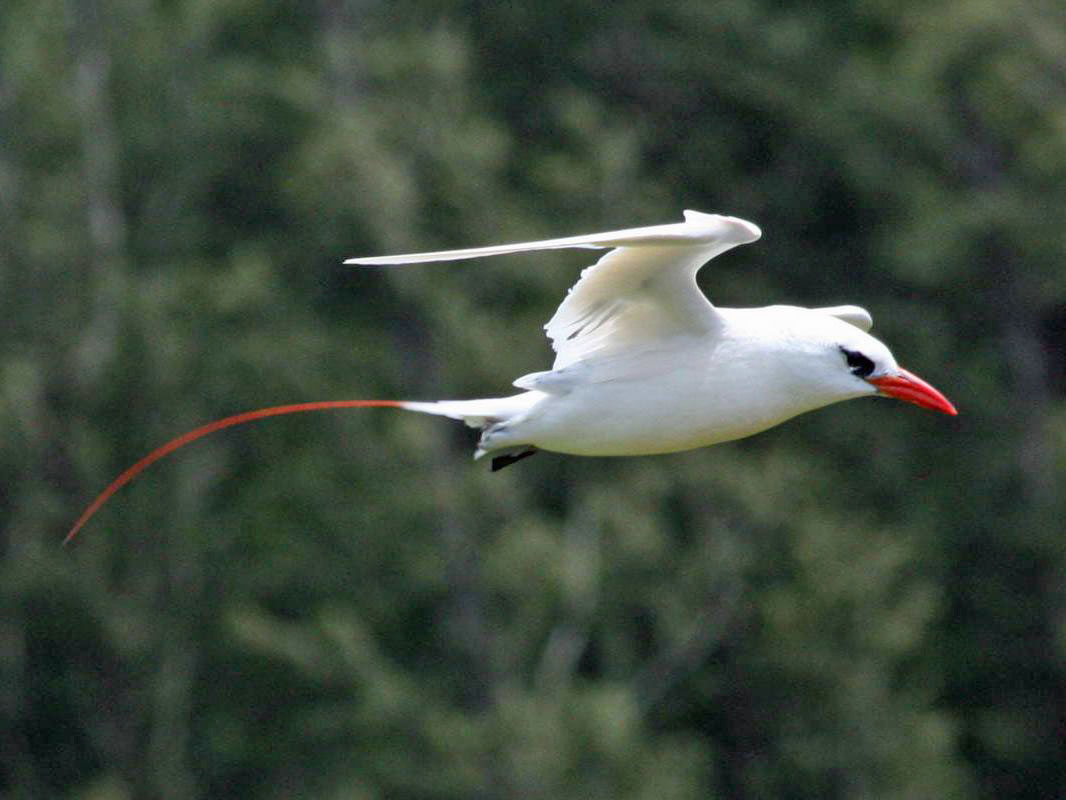
Red-tailed tropicbird

3 species recorded [2 extant native, 1 vagrant]
Tropicbirds are slender white birds of tropical oceans, with exceptionally long central tail feathers. Their long wings have black markings, as does the head. Three species have been recorded from Australian waters.

Common name	Binomial	Notes
White-tailed tropicbird	Phaethon lepturus	
Red-billed tropicbird	Phaethon aethereus	vagrant, Ashmore Reef & Lord Howe Island
Red-tailed tropicbird	Phaethon rubricauda	

== Penguins ==
Order: Sphenisciformes Family: Spheniscidae

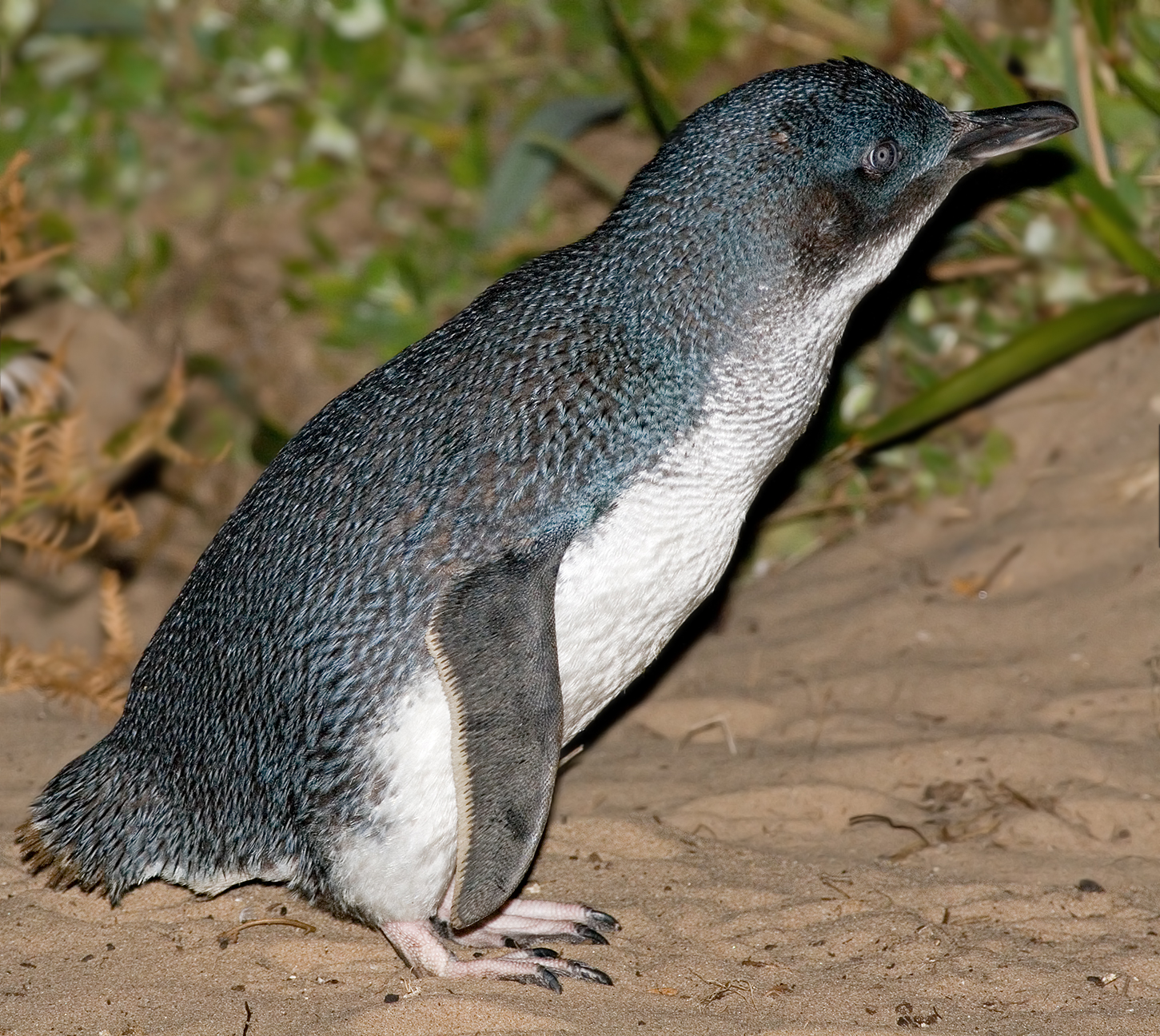
A wild Australian little penguin returning to its burrow to feed its chicks on Bruny Island

14 species recorded [7 extant native, 7 vagrant]
Penguins are a group of aquatic, flightless birds living almost exclusively in the Southern Hemisphere, especially in Antarctica. Only one species, the Australian little penguin, breeds on the Australian coast.

Common name	Binomial	Notes
King penguin	Aptenodytes patagonicus	Macquarie & Heard Island; mainland vagrant
Emperor penguin	Aptenodytes forsteri	vagrant, Macquarie & Heard Island
Adélie penguin	Pygoscelis adeliae	vagrant, TAS, Macquarie & Heard Island
Gentoo penguin	Pygoscelis papua	Macquarie & Heard Island; mainland vagrant
Chinstrap penguin	Pygoscelis antarcticus	vagrant, VIC, TAS, Macquarie & Heard Island
Australian little penguin	Eudyptula novaehollandiae	
Magellanic penguin	Spheniscus magellanicus	vagrant
Fiordland penguin	Eudyptes pachyrhynchus	
Erect-crested penguin	Eudyptes sclateri	vagrant
Macaroni penguin	Eudyptes chrysolophus	Macquarie Island; Heard Island
Royal penguin	Eudyptes schlegeli	Macquarie Island; mainland vagrant
Southern rockhopper penguin	Eudyptes chrysocome	Macquarie & Heard Island; mainland vagrant
Moseley's rockhopper penguin	Eudyptes moseleyi	vagrant
Snares penguin	Eudyptes robustus	vagrant

== Albatrosses ==
Order: Procellariiformes Family: Diomedeidae

12 species recorded [11 extant native, 1 vagrant]
The albatrosses are a family of large seabird found across the Southern and North Pacific Oceans. The largest are among the largest flying birds in the world. Thirteen species are seen to varying degrees in Australian waters, with two recorded as vagrants.

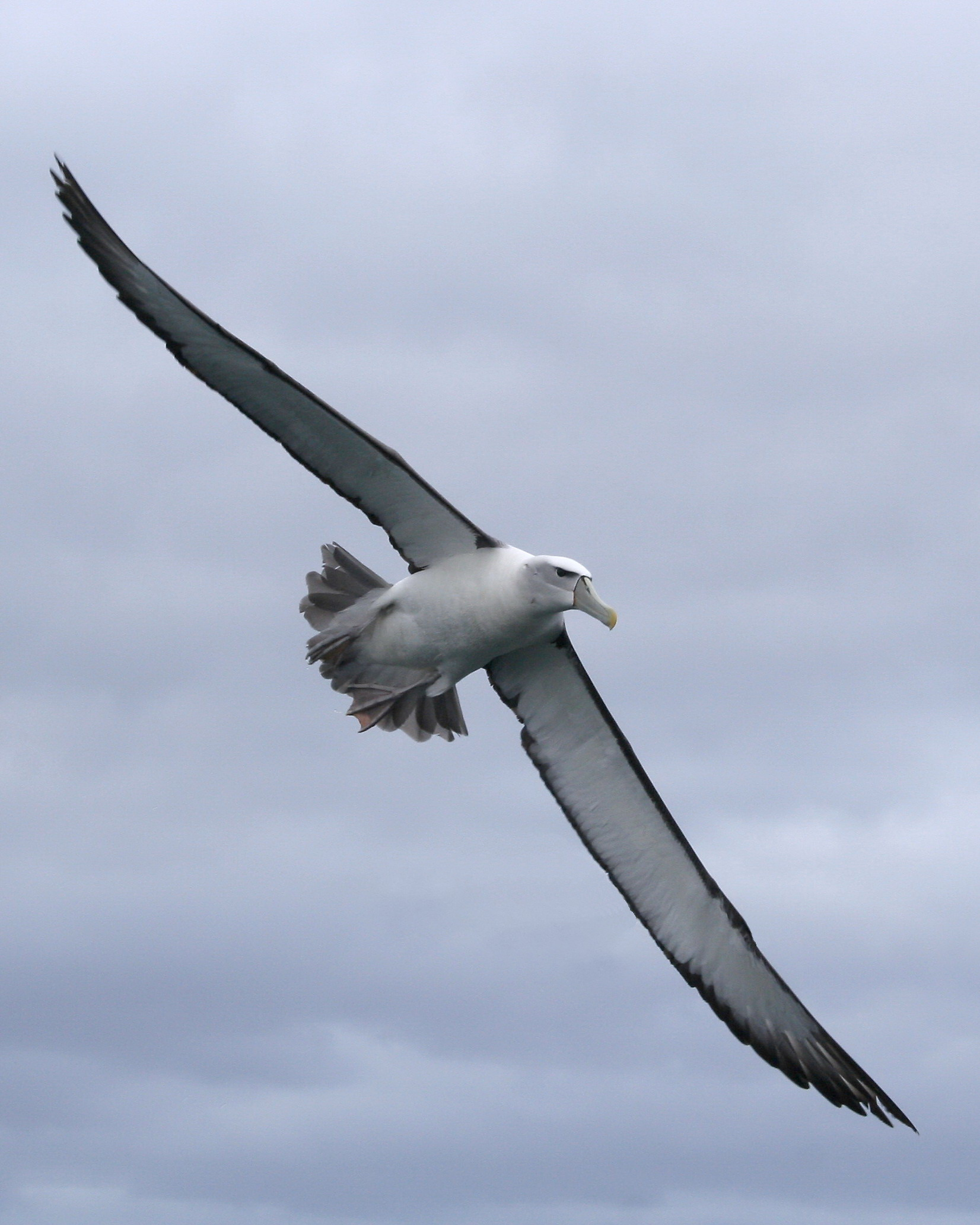
White-capped albatross

Common name	Binomial	Notes
Indian yellow-nosed albatross	Thalassarche carteri	
Grey-headed albatross	Thalassarche chrysostoma	
Buller's albatross	Thalassarche bulleri	
White-capped albatross	Thalassarche cauta	
Salvin's albatross	Thalassarche salvini	
Chatham albatross	Thalassarche eremita	vagrant
Campbell albatross	Thalassarche impavida	
Black-browed albatross	Thalassarche melanophris	
Sooty albatross	Phoebetria fusca	
Light-mantled albatross	Phoebetria palpebrata	
Royal albatross	Diomedea epomophora	
Wandering albatross	Diomedea exulans	

== Southern storm-petrels ==
Order: Procellariiformes Family: Oceanitidae

7 species recorded [5 extant native, 2 vagrant]
The southern storm-petrels are the smallest seabirds, relatives of the petrels, feeding on planktonic crustaceans and small fish picked from the surface, typically while hovering. Their flight is fluttering and sometimes bat-like.

Common name	Binomial	Notes
Wilson's storm-petrel	Oceanites oceanicus	
Grey-backed storm-petrel	Garrodia nereis	
White-faced storm-petrel	Pelagodroma marina	
White-bellied storm-petrel	Fregetta grallaria	
New Zealand storm-petrel	Fregetta maoriana	vagrant
Black-bellied storm-petrel	Fregetta tropica	
Polynesian storm-petrel	Nesofregetta fuliginosa	vagrant

== Northern storm-petrels ==
Order: Procellariiformes Family: Hydrobatidae

5 species recorded [2 extant native, 3 vagrant]
Though the members of this family are similar in many respects to the southern storm-petrels, including their general appearance and habits, there are enough genetic differences to warrant their placement in a separate family.

Common name	Binomial	Notes
Leach's storm-petrel	Hydrobates leucorhous	vagrant
Swinhoe's storm-petrel	Hydrobates monorhis	
Band-rumped storm-petrel	Hydrobates castro	vagrant
Matsudaira's storm-petrel	Hydrobates matsudairae	
Tristram's storm-petrel	Hydrobates tristrami	vagrant

== Shearwaters and petrels ==
Order: Procellariiformes Family: Procellariidae

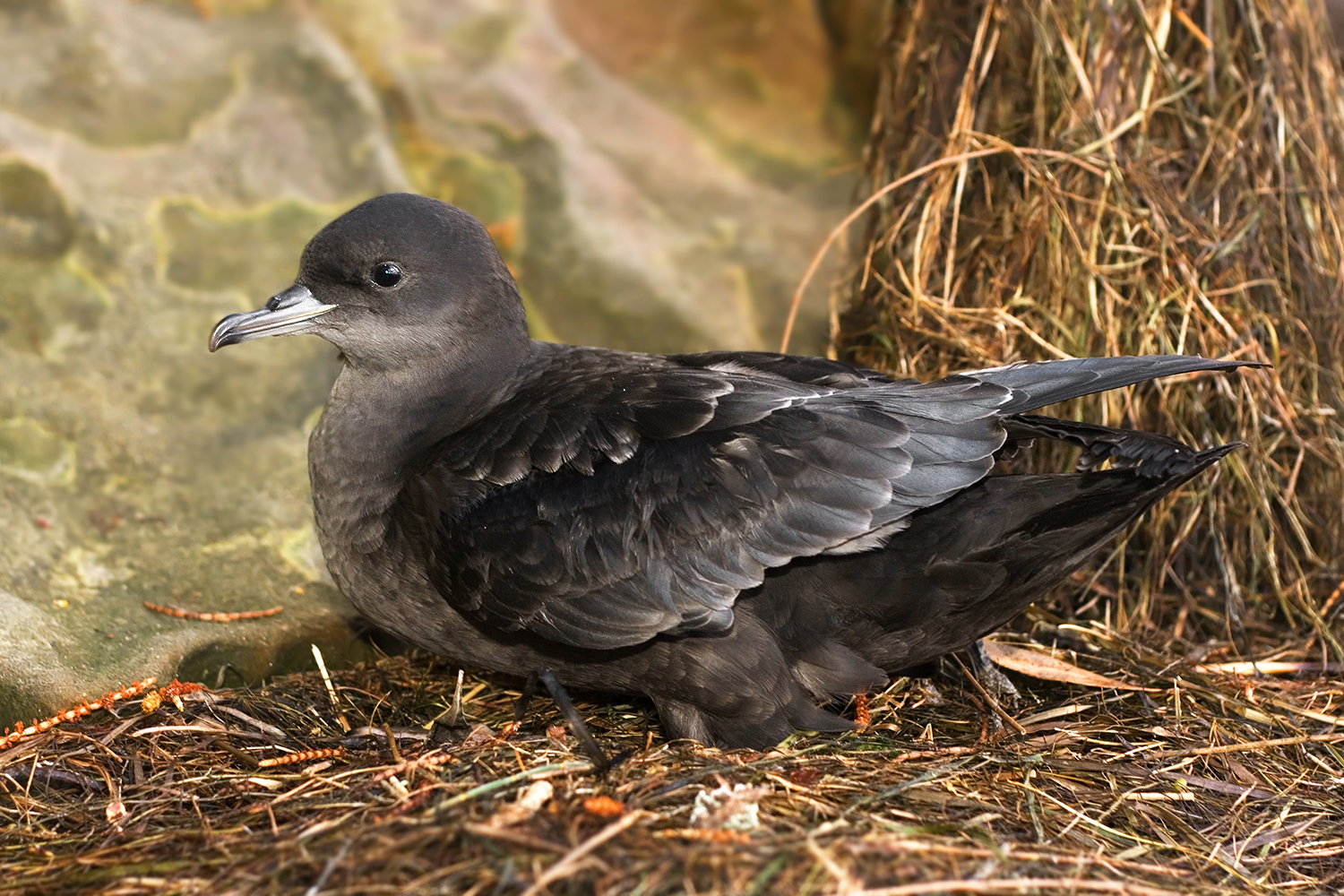
Short-tailed shearwater

62 species recorded [41 native extant, 20 vagrant, 1 extirpated]
The procellariids are the main group of medium-sized "true petrels", characterised by united nostrils with medium nasal septum, and a long outer functional primary flight feather.

Common name	Binomial	Notes
Southern giant-petrel	Macronectes giganteus	
Northern giant-petrel	Macronectes halli	
Southern fulmar	Fulmarus glacialoides	
Antarctic petrel	Thalassoica antarctica	vagrant
Cape petrel	Daption capense	
Snow petrel	Pagodroma nivea	vagrant, Heard & Macquarie Island
Kerguelen petrel	Aphrodroma brevirostris	
Great-winged petrel	Pterodroma macroptera	
Grey-faced petrel	Pterodroma gouldi	vagrant
Kermadec petrel	Pterodroma neglecta	Lord Howe Island; Norfolk Island; mainland vagrant;
Trindade petrel	Pterodroma arminjoniana	vagrant
Herald petrel	Pterodroma heraldica	
Providence petrel	Pterodroma solandri	
Soft-plumaged petrel	Pterodroma mollis	
Barau's petrel	Pterodroma baraui	vagrant
White-headed petrel	Pterodroma lessonii	
Mottled petrel	Pterodroma inexpectata	
Juan Fernandez petrel	Pterodroma externa	vagrant
Atlantic petrel	Pterodroma incerta	vagrant
White-necked petrel	Pterodroma cervicalis	
Black-winged petrel	Pterodroma nigripennis	
Cook's petrel	Pterodroma cookii	
Gould's petrel	Pterodroma leucoptera	
Collared petrel	Pterodroma brevipes	vagrant
Stejneger's petrel	Pterodroma longirostris	vagrant
Phoenix petrel	Pterodroma alba	vagrant
Pycroft's petrel	Pterodroma pycrofti	extirpated, Norfolk Island; possible vagrant
Vanuatu petrel	Pterodroma occulta	vagrant
Blue petrel	Halobaena caerulea	
Fairy prion	Pachyptila turtur	
Broad-billed prion	Pachyptila vittata	
Salvin's prion	Pachyptila salvini	
Antarctic prion	Pachyptila desolata	
Slender-billed prion	Pachyptila belcheri	
Fulmar prion	Pachyptila crassirostris	mainland vagrant; Heard Island
Bulwer's petrel	Bulweria bulwerii	
Jouanin's petrel	Bulweria fallax	
Tahiti petrel	Pseudobulweria rostrata	
Grey petrel	Procellaria cinerea	
White-chinned petrel	Procellaria aequinoctialis	
Parkinson's petrel	Procellaria parkinsoni	
Westland petrel	Procellaria westlandica	
Streaked shearwater	Calonectris leucomelas	
Cory's shearwater	Calonectris borealis	vagrant
Pink-footed shearwater	Ardenna creatopus	vagrant
Flesh-footed shearwater	Ardenna carneipes	
Great shearwater	Ardenna gravis	vagrant
Wedge-tailed shearwater	Ardenna pacifica	
Buller's shearwater	Ardenna bulleri	
Sooty shearwater	Ardenna grisea	
Short-tailed shearwater	Ardenna tenuirostris	
Manx shearwater	Puffinus puffinus	vagrant
Hutton's shearwater	Puffinus huttoni	
Newell's shearwater	Puffinus newelli	vagrant
Fluttering shearwater	Puffinus gavia	
Little shearwater	Puffinus assimilis	
Subantarctic shearwater	Puffinus elegans	
Tropical shearwater	Puffinus bailloni	vagrant
Persian shearwater	Puffinus persicus	possible vagrant
Heinroth's shearwater	Puffinus heinrothi	vagrant
Common diving-petrel	Pelecanoides urinatrix	
South Georgian diving-petrel	Pelecanoides georgicus	Macquarie & Heard Island; mainland vagrant

== Storks ==
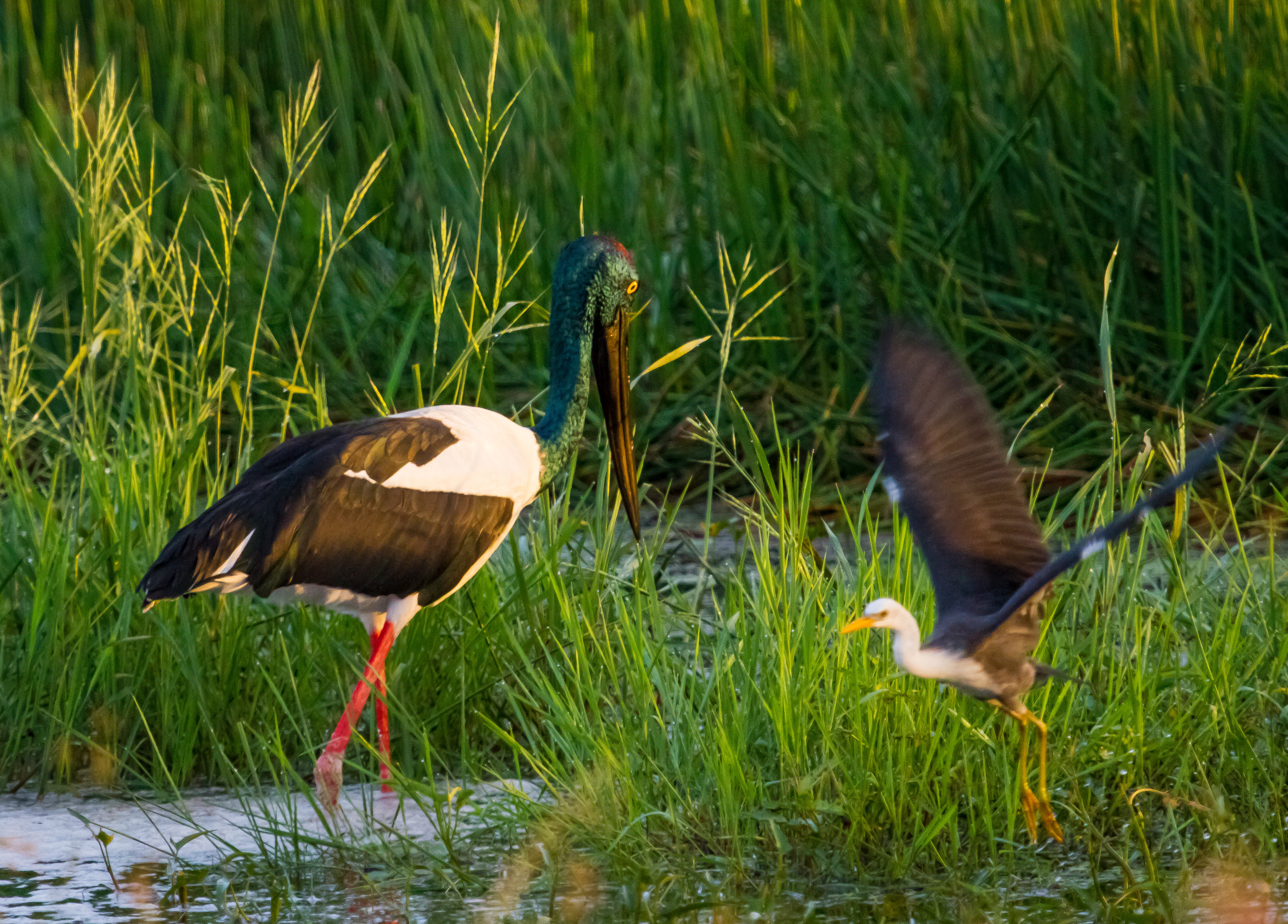
Black necked stork (jabiru) and juvenile pied heron in flight at Fogg Dam in the Northern Territory

Order: Ciconiiformes Family: Ciconiidae

1 species recorded [1 extant native]
Storks are large, long-legged, long-necked, wading birds with long, stout bills. Storks are mute, but bill-clattering is an important mode of communication at the nest. Their nests can be large and may be reused for many years.

Common name	Binomial	Notes
Black-necked stork	Ephippiorhynchus asiaticus	

== Frigatebirds ==
Order: Suliformes Family: Fregatidae

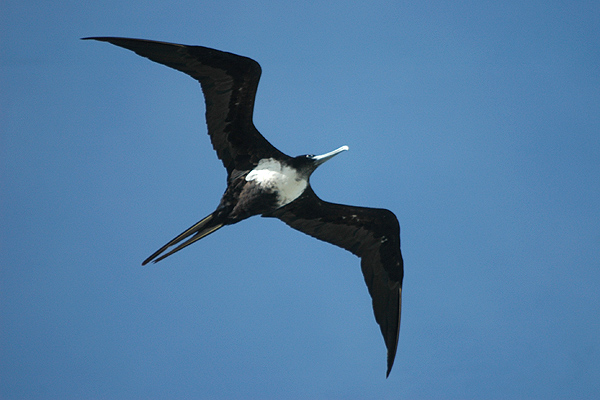
Great frigatebird

3 species recorded [3 extant native]
Frigatebirds are large seabirds usually found over tropical oceans. They are large, black, or black-and-white, with long wings and deeply forked tails. The males have coloured inflatable throat pouches. They do not swim or walk and cannot take off from a flat surface. Having the largest wingspan-to-body-weight ratio of any bird, they are essentially aerial, able to stay aloft for more than a week.

Common name	Binomial	Notes
Lesser frigatebird	Fregata ariel	
Christmas Island frigatebird	Fregata andrewsi	Christmas Island; mainland vagrant
Great frigatebird	Fregata minor	

== Boobies and gannets ==
Order: Suliformes Family: Sulidae

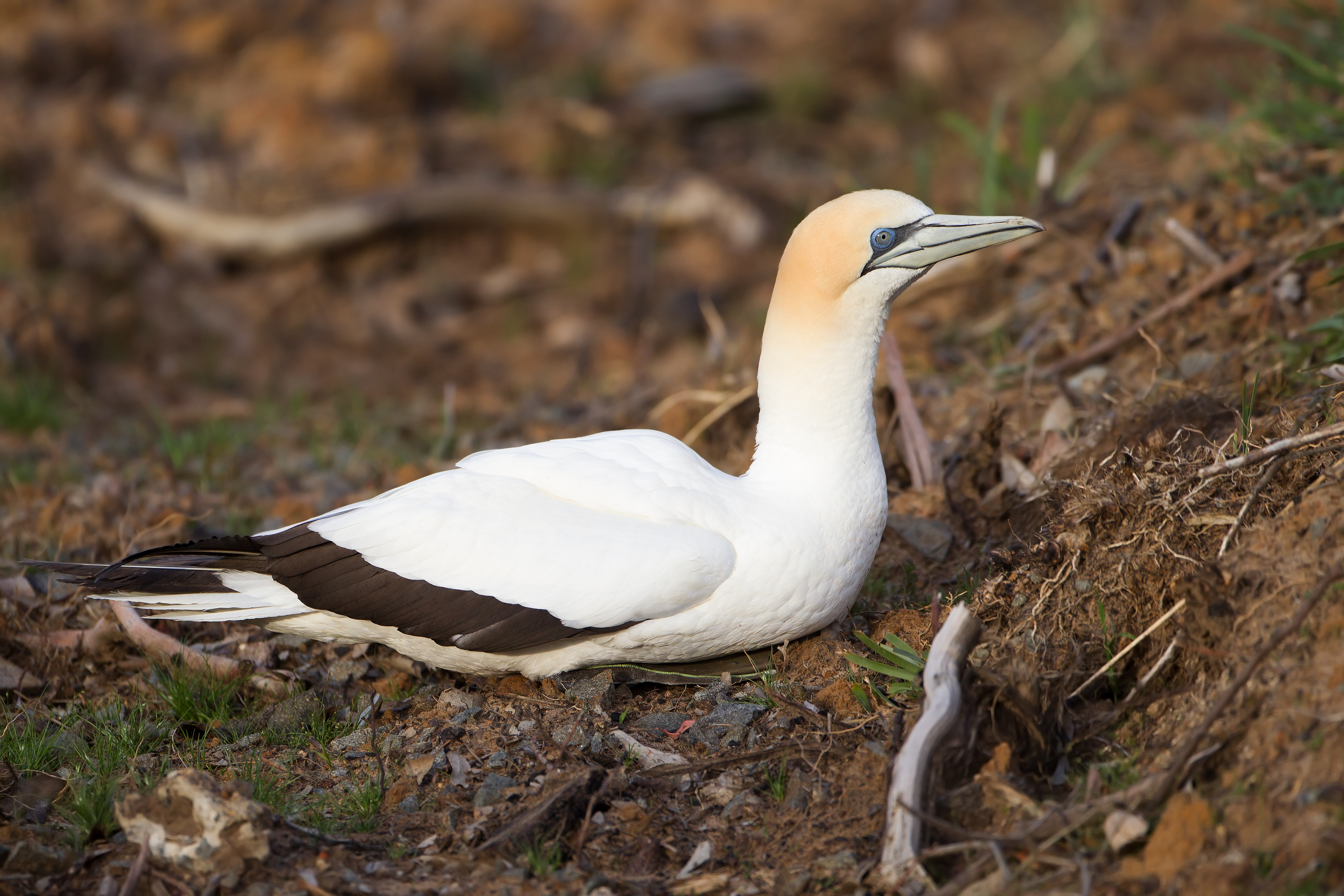
Australasian gannet

7 species recorded [5 extant native, 2 vagrant]
The sulids comprise the gannets and boobies. Both groups are medium-large coastal seabirds that plunge-dive for fish. Six species have been recorded from Australian territory.

Common name	Binomial	Notes
Masked booby	Sula dactylatra	
Nazca booby	Sula granti	vagrant
Brown booby	Sula leucogaster	
Red-footed booby	Sula sula	
Abbott's booby	Papasula abbotti	Christmas Island; mainland vagrant
Cape gannet	Morus capensis	vagrant
Australasian gannet	Morus serrator	

== Anhingas ==
Order: Suliformes Family: Anhingidae

2 species recorded [1 extant native, 1 vagrant]
Anhingas or darters are cormorant-like water birds with long necks and long, straight bills. They are fish eaters which often swim with only their neck above the water. One species is found in Australia.

Common name	Binomial	Notes
Oriental darter	Anhinga melanogaster	vagrant
Australasian darter	Anhinga novaehollandiae	

== Cormorants and shags ==
Order: Suliformes Family: Phalacrocoracidae

9 species recorded [7 extant native, 2 vagrant]
Cormorants are medium-to-large aquatic birds, usually with mainly dark plumage and areas of coloured skin on the face. The bill is long, thin and sharply hooked. Their feet are four-toed and webbed, a distinguishing feature among the order Pelecaniformes. Nine species occur in Australian territory, with two as vagrants.

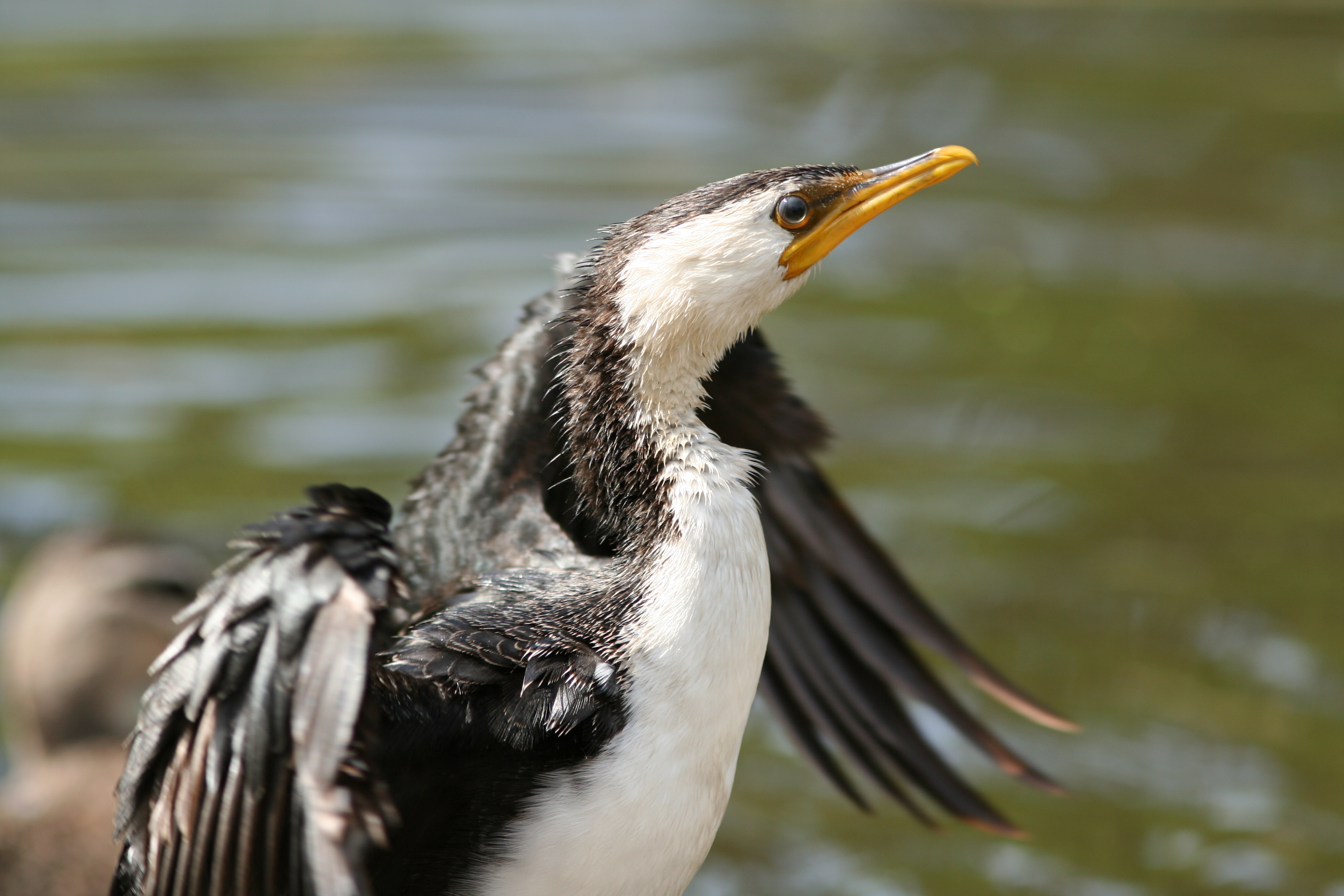
Little pied cormorant

Common name	Binomial	Notes
Little pied cormorant	Microcarbo melanoleucos	
Great cormorant	Phalacrocorax carbo	
Spotted shag	Phalacrocorax punctatus	vagrant
Little black cormorant	Phalacrocorax sulcirostris	
Pied cormorant	Phalacrocorax varius	
Black-faced cormorant	Phalacrocorax fuscescens	
Kerguelen shag	Leucocarbo verrucosus	vagrant
Macquarie shag	Leucocarbo purpurascens	Macquarie Island. Sometimes considered a subspecies of imperial shag
Heard Island shag	Leucocarbo nivalis	Heard Island and McDonald Islands. Sometimes considered a subspecies of imperial shag

== Pelicans ==
Order: Pelecaniformes Family: Pelecanidae

1 species recorded [1 extant native]
Pelicans are large water birds with distinctive pouches under their bills. Like other birds in the order Pelecaniformes, they have four webbed toes. One species has been recorded in Australia.

Common name	Binomial	Notes
Australian pelican	Pelecanus conspicillatus	

== Herons, egrets, and bitterns ==
Order: Pelecaniformes Family: Ardeidae

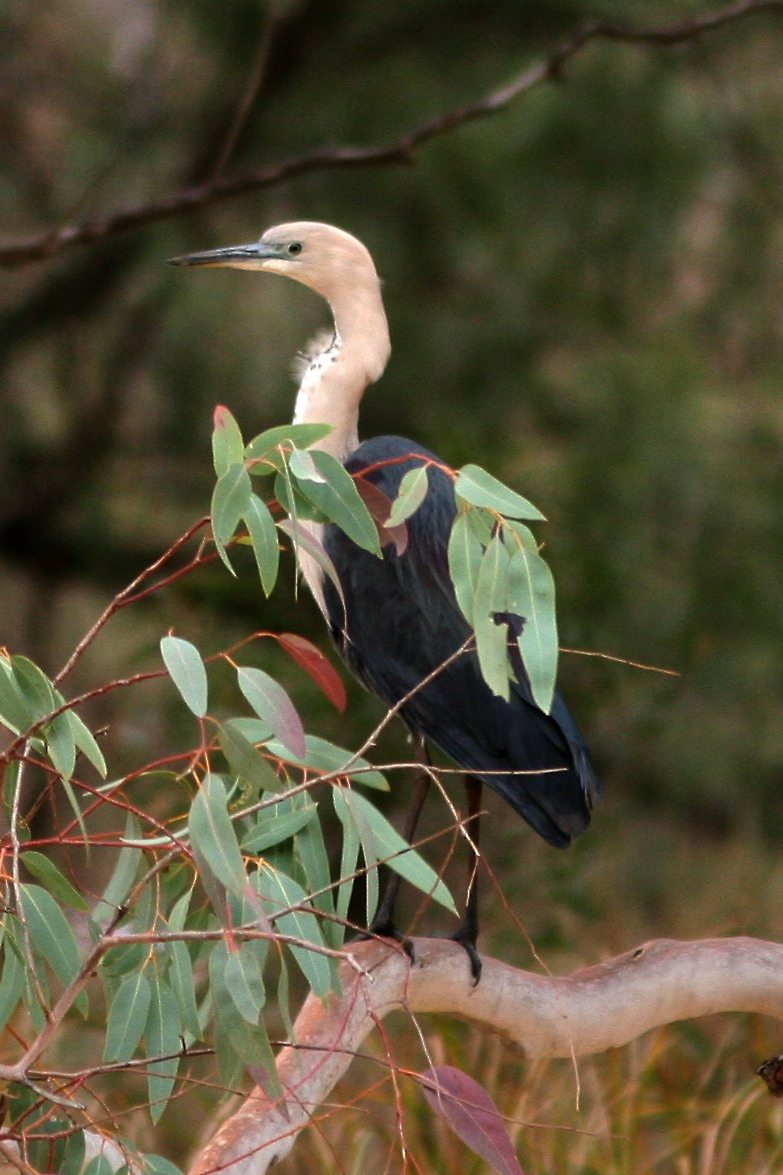
White-necked heron

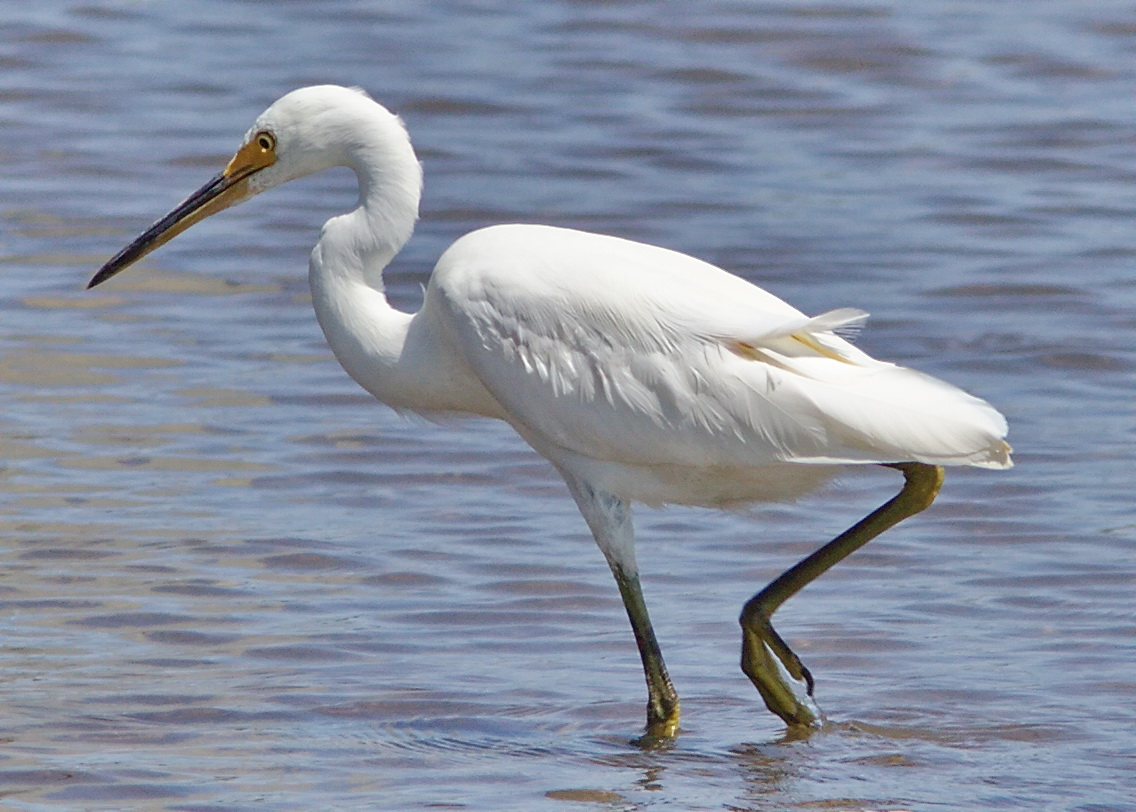
Australian little egret

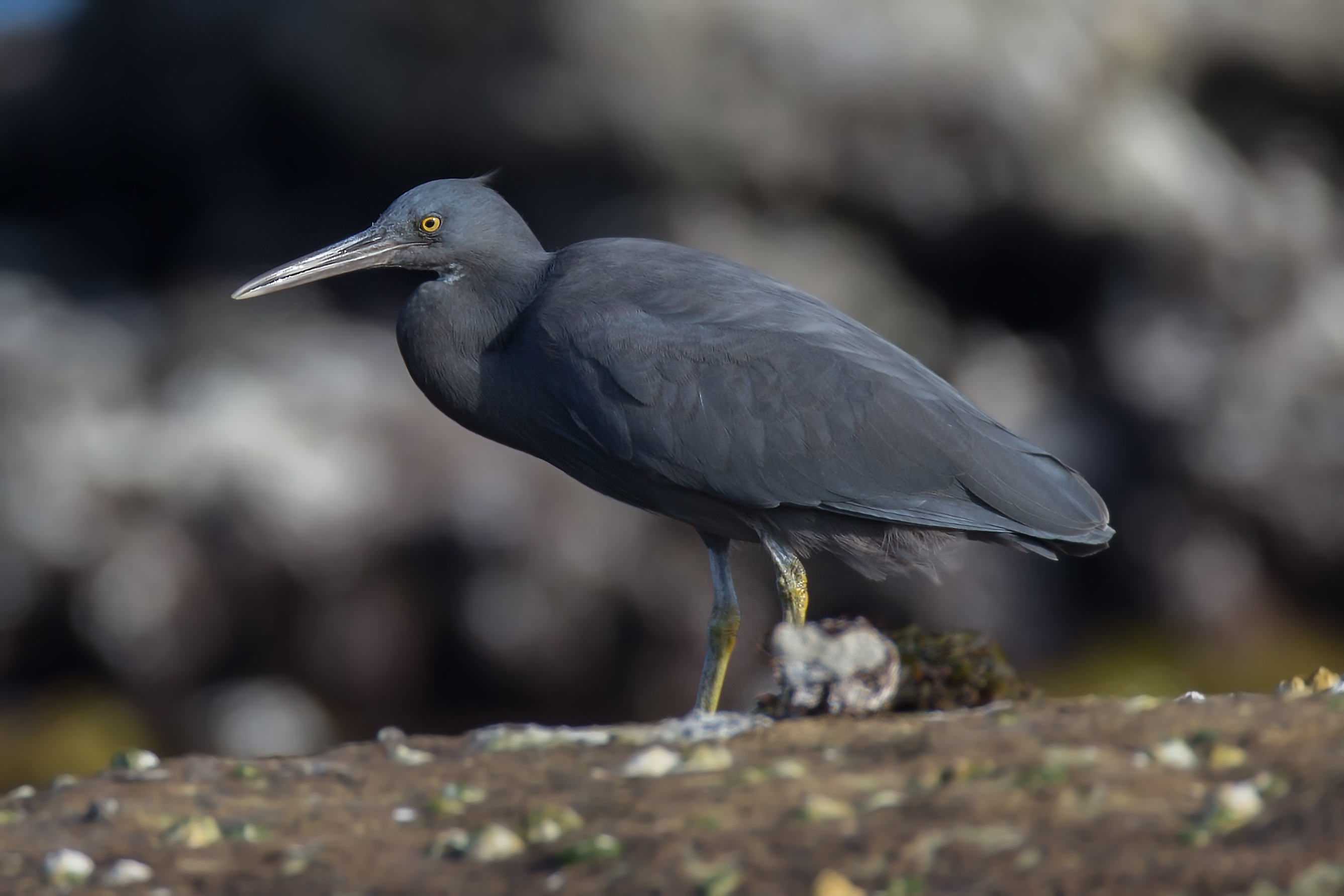
Pacific reef heron, dark morph

25 species recorded [15 extant native, 10 vagrant]
The family Ardeidae contains the bitterns, herons, and egrets. Herons and egrets are medium to large wading birds with long necks and legs. Bitterns tend to be shorter necked and more wary. Members of Ardeidae fly with their necks retracted, unlike other long-necked birds such as storks, ibises, and spoonbills.

Common name	Binomial	Notes
Australasian bittern	Botaurus poiciloptilus	
Yellow bittern	Ixobrychus sinensis	vagrant
Black-backed bittern	Ixobrychus dubius	
Schrenck's bittern	Ixobrychus eurhythmus	vagrant, Christmas Island
Cinnamon bittern	Ixobrychus cinnamomeus	vagrant
Black bittern	Ixobrychus flavicollis	
Grey heron	Ardea cinerea	vagrant
Pacific heron	Ardea pacifica	
Great-billed heron	Ardea sumatrana	
Purple heron	Ardea purpurea	vagrant
Great egret	Ardea alba	
Plumed egret	Ardea plumifera	
White-faced heron	Egretta novaehollandiae	
Little egret	Egretta garzetta	
Western reef-heron	Egretta gularis	vagrant, Cocos (Keeling) Islands but likely hybridised with E. sacra
Pacific reef-heron	Egretta sacra	
Pied heron	Egretta picata	
Eastern cattle egret	Ardea coromanda	
Chinese pond-heron	Ardeola bacchus	vagrant
Javan pond-heron	Ardeola speciosa	vagrant
Striated heron	Butorides striatus	
Black-crowned night-heron	Nycticorax nycticorax	vagrant, Cocos (Keeling) Islands & Ashmore Reef
Nankeen night-heron	Nycticorax caledonicus	
Japanese night-heron	Gorsachius goisagi	vagrant, Christmas Island
Malayan night-heron	Gorsachius melanolophus	vagrant, Christmas Island

== Ibises and spoonbills ==
Order: Pelecaniformes Family: Threskiornithidae

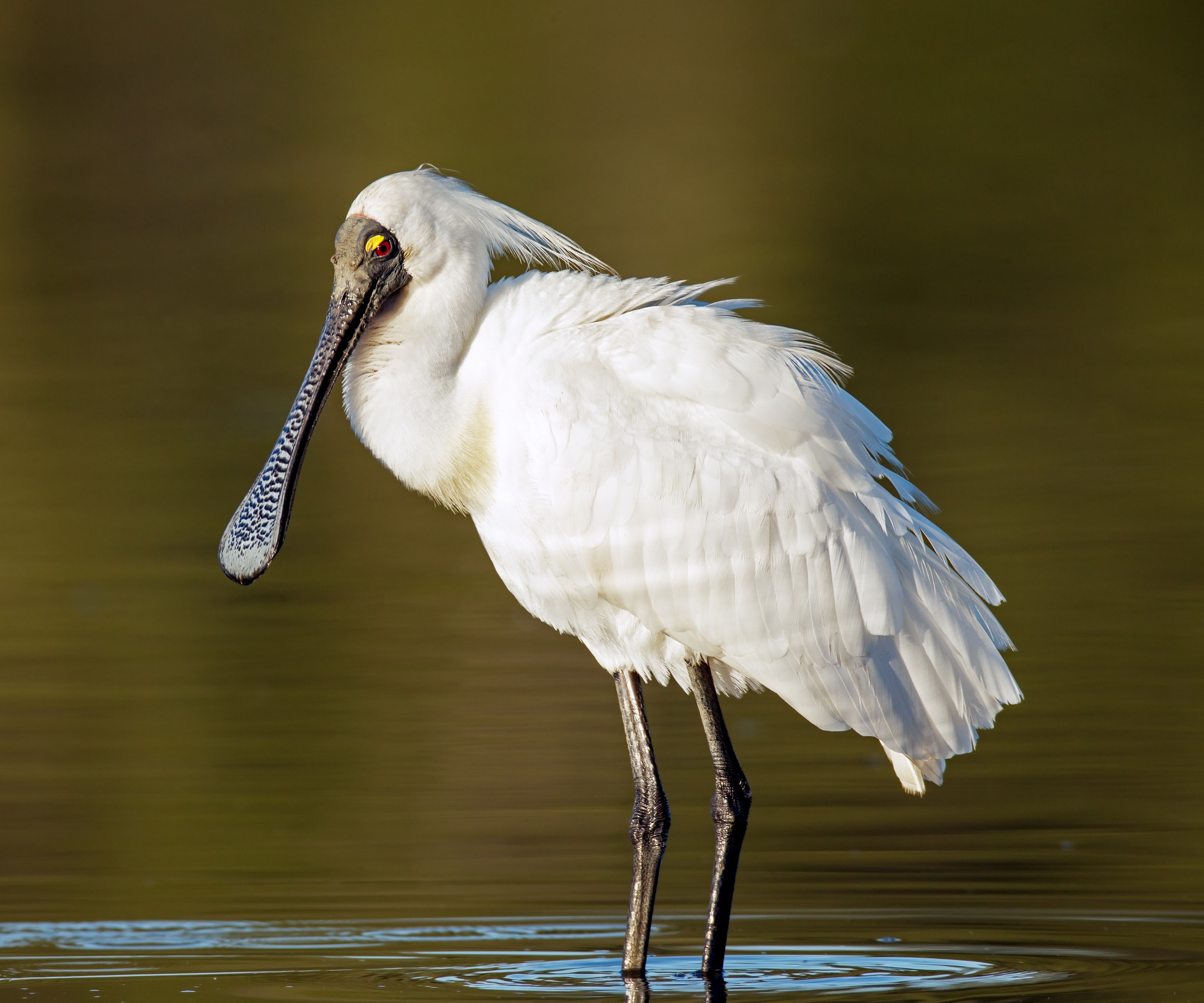
Royal spoonbill

5 species recorded [5 extant native]
Threskiornithidae is a family of large terrestrial and wading birds which includes the ibises and spoonbills. They have long, broad wings with 11 primary and about 20 secondary feathers. They are strong fliers and despite their size and weight, very capable soarers.

Common name	Binomial	Notes
Glossy ibis	Plegadis falcinellus	
Australian ibis	Threskiornis moluccus	
Straw-necked ibis	Threskiornis spinicollis	
Royal spoonbill	Platalea regia	
Yellow-billed spoonbill	Platalea flavipes	

== Osprey ==
Order: Accipitriformes Family: Pandionidae

1 species recorded [1 extant native]
The family Pandionidae contains only one species, the osprey. The osprey is a medium-large raptor which is a specialist fish-eater with a worldwide distribution.

Common name	Binomial	Notes
Osprey	Pandion haliaetus	

== Hawks, eagles, and kites ==
Order: Accipitriformes Family: Accipitridae

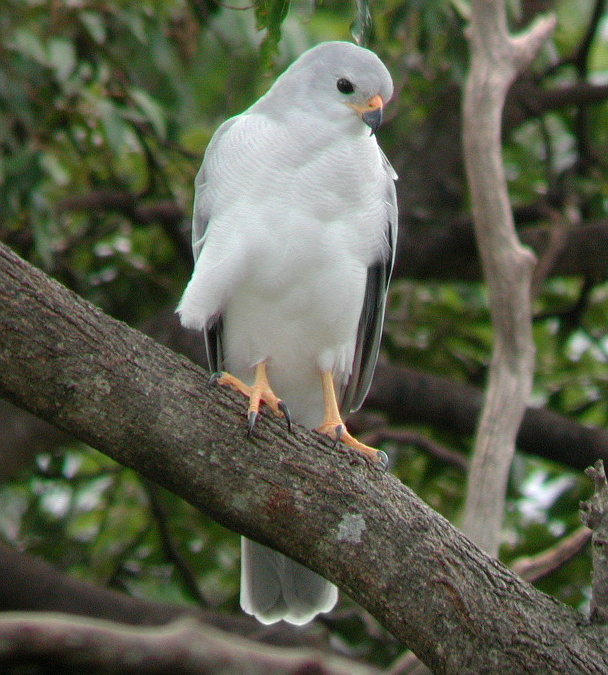
Grey goshawk

22 species recorded [17 extant native, 5 vagrant]
Accipitridae is a family of birds of prey, which includes hawks, eagles, kites, harriers, and Old World vultures. These birds have powerful hooked beaks for tearing flesh from their prey, strong legs, powerful talons, and keen eyesight.

Common name	Binomial	Notes
Black-shouldered kite	Elanus axillaris	
Letter-winged kite	Elanus scriptus	
Oriental honey-buzzard	Pernis ptilorhynchus	vagrant
Black-breasted kite	Hamirostra melanosternon	
Long-tailed honey-buzzard	Henicopernis longicauda	vagrant
Square-tailed kite	Lophoictinia isura	
Pacific baza	Aviceda subcristata	
Little eagle	Hieraaetus morphnoides	
Gurney's eagle	Aquila gurneyi	vagrant, Torres Strait
Wedge-tailed eagle	Aquila audax	
Swamp harrier	Circus approximans	
Spotted harrier	Circus assimilis	
Chinese sparrowhawk	Accipiter soloensis	vagrant, Cocos (Keeling) Islands & Ashmore Reef
Grey goshawk	Accipiter novaehollandiae	
Brown goshawk	Accipiter fasciatus	
Japanese sparrowhawk	Accipiter gularis	vagrant, Cocos (Keeling) Islands & Ashmore Reef
Collared sparrowhawk	Accipiter cirrocephalus	
Red goshawk	Erythrotriorchis radiatus	
Black kite	Milvus migrans	
Whistling kite	Haliastur sphenurus	
Brahminy kite	Haliastur indus	
White-bellied sea eagle	Haliaeetus leucogaster	

== Barn-owls ==
Order: Strigiformes Family: Tytonidae

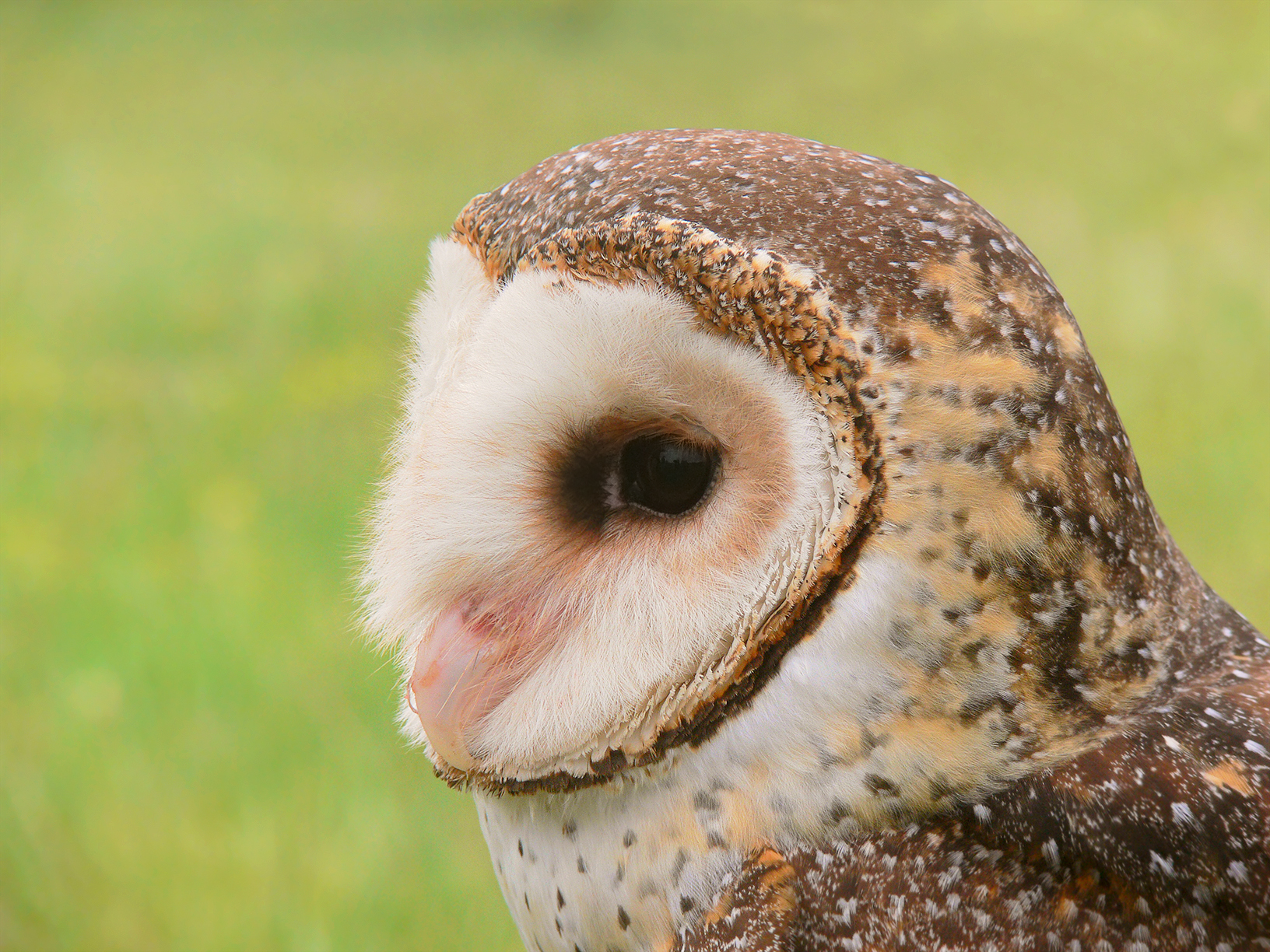
Masked owl

5 species recorded [5 extant native]
Barn-owls are medium to large owls with large heads and characteristic heart-shaped faces. They have long strong legs with powerful talons.

Common name	Binomial	Notes
Greater sooty owl	Tyto tenebricosa	
Lesser sooty owl	Tyto multipunctata	
Australian masked-owl	Tyto novaehollandiae	
Australasian grass-owl	Tyto longimembris	
Eastern barn owl	Tyto javanica	

== Owls ==
Order: Strigiformes Family: Strigidae

10 species recorded [6 extant native, 4 vagrant]
The typical owls are small to large solitary nocturnal birds of prey. They have large forward-facing eyes and ears, a hawk-like beak, and a conspicuous circle of feathers around each eye called a facial disk.

Common name	Binomial	Notes
Oriental scops-owl	Otis sunia	vagrant, Barrow Island, WA
Buffy fish-owl	Ketupa ketupu	vagrant, Cocos (Keeling) Islands
Rufous owl	Ninox rufa	
Powerful owl	Ninox strenua	
Barking owl	Ninox connivens	
Australian boobook	Ninox boobook	
Tasmanian boobook	Ninox leucopsis	
Brown boobook	Ninox scutulata	vagrant
Northern boobook	Ninox japonica	vagrant
Christmas Island boobook	Ninox natalis	Christmas Island

== Hoopoes ==
Order: Bucerotiformes Family: Upupidae

1 species recorded [1 vagrant]
Hoopoes have black, white, and orangey-pink colouring with a large erectile crest on their head.

Common name	Binomial	Notes
Eurasian hoopoe	Upupa epops	vagrant

== Hornbills ==
Order: Bucerotiformes Family: Bucerotidae

1 species recorded [1 vagrant]
Hornbills are a group of birds whose bill is shaped like a cow's horn, but without a twist, sometimes with a casque on the upper mandible. Frequently, the bill is brightly coloured.

Common name	Binomial	Notes
Blyth's hornbill	Rhyticeros plicatus	vagrant, Torres Strait Islands

== Kingfishers ==
Order: Coraciiformes Family: Alcedinidae

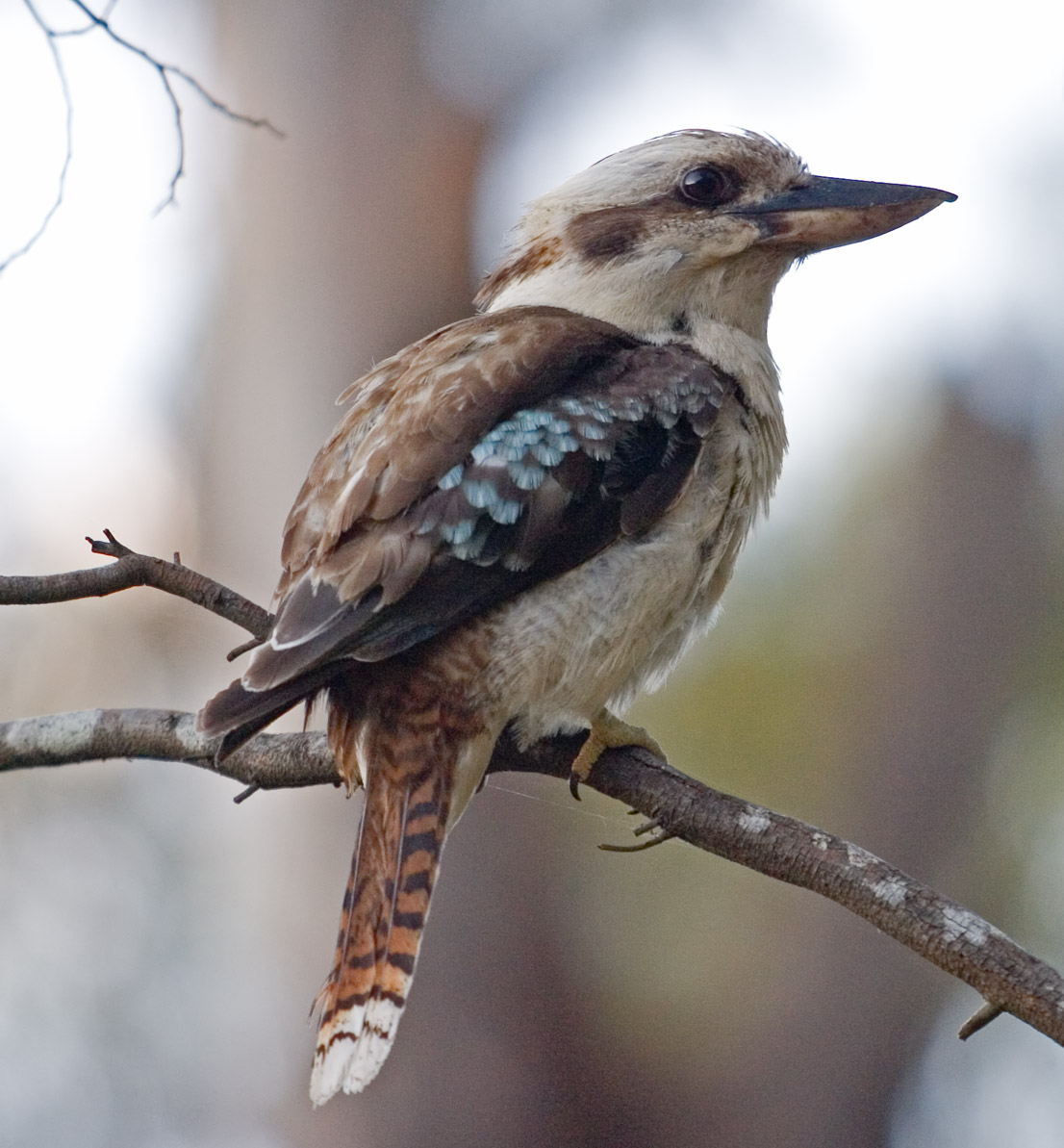
Laughing kookaburra

15 species recorded [10 extant native, 5 vagrant]
Kingfishers are medium-sized birds with large heads, long pointed bills, short legs, and stubby tails.

Common name	Binomial	Notes
Common kingfisher	Alcedo atthis	vagrant, Christmas & Cocos (Keeling) Islands
Azure kingfisher	Ceyx azureus	
Little kingfisher	Ceyx pusillus	
Laughing kookaburra	Dacelo novaeguineae	
Blue-winged kookaburra	Dacelo leachii	
Black-capped kingfisher	Halcyon pileata	vagrant
Red-backed kingfisher	Todiramphus pyrrhopygia	
Forest kingfisher	Todiramphus macleayii	
Torresian kingfisher	Todiramphus sordidus	
Sacred kingfisher	Todiramphus sanctus	
Collared kingfisher	Todiramphus chloris	vagrant
Yellow-billed kingfisher	Syma torotoro	
Little paradise-kingfisher	Tanysiptera hydrocharis	vagrant, Torres Strait
Common paradise-kingfisher	Tanysiptera galatea	vagrant, Torres Strait
Buff-breasted paradise-kingfisher	Tanysiptera sylvia	

== Bee-eaters ==
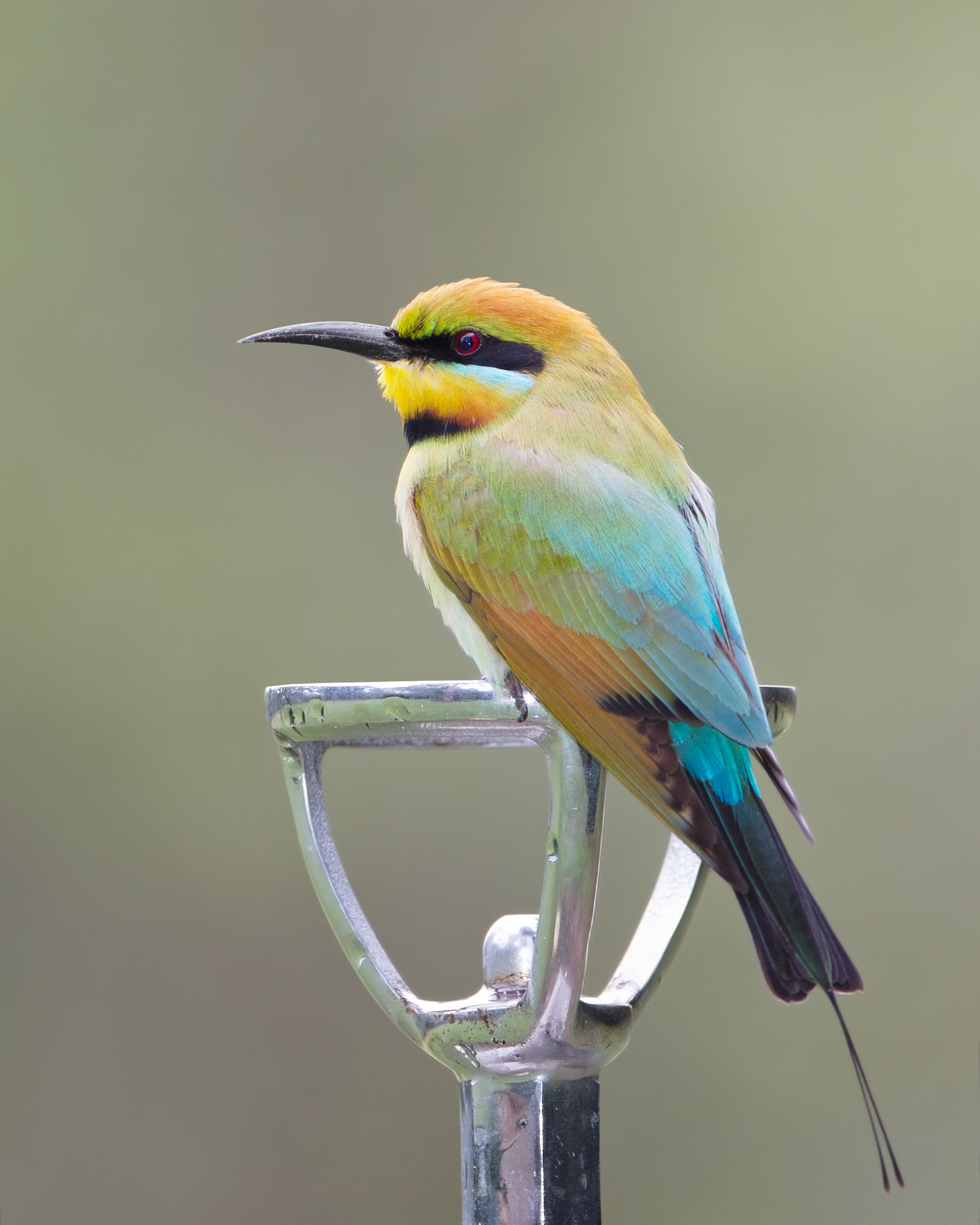
Rainbow bee-eater

Order: Coraciiformes Family: Meropidae

1 species recorded [1 extant native]
The bee-eaters are a group of coraciiform birds in the family Meropidae. Most species are found in Africa but others occur in southern Europe, Madagascar, Australia, and New Guinea. They are characterised by richly coloured plumage, slender bodies, and usually elongated central tail feathers. All are colourful and have long downturned bills and pointed wings, which give them a swallow-like appearance when seen from afar.

Common name	Binomial	Notes
Rainbow bee-eater	Merops ornatus	

== Rollers ==
Order: Coraciiformes Family: Coraciidae

2 species recorded [1 extant native, 1 vagrant]
Rollers resemble crows in size and build, but are more closely related to the kingfishers and bee-eaters. They share the colourful appearance of those groups with blues and browns predominating. The two inner front toes are connected, but the outer toe is not.

Common name	Binomial	Notes
European roller	Coracias garrulus	vagrant, Cocos (Keeling) Islands
Dollarbird	Eurystomus orientalis	

== Falcons and caracaras ==
Order: Falconiformes Family: Falconidae

8 species recorded [6 extant native, 2 vagrant]
Falconidae is a family of diurnal birds of prey. They differ from hawks, eagles, and kites in that they kill with their beaks instead of their talons.

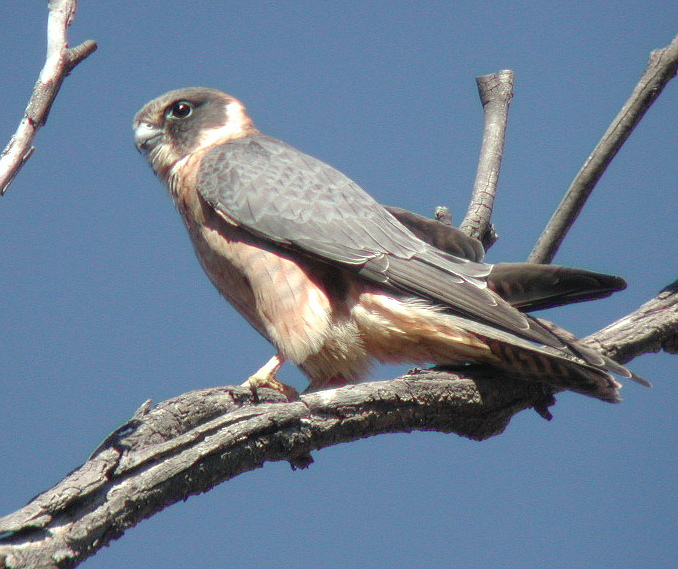
Australian hobby

Common name	Binomial	Notes
Nankeen kestrel	Falco cenchroides	
Amur falcon	Falco amurensis	vagrant
Eurasian hobby	Falco subbuteo	vagrant
Australian hobby	Falco longipennis	
Brown falcon	Falco berigora	
Grey falcon	Falco hypoleucos	
Black falcon	Falco subniger	
Peregrine falcon	Falco peregrinus	

== New Zealand parrots ==
Order: Psittaciformes Family: Nestoridae

1 species recorded [1 extinct native]
The family diverged from the other parrots around 82 million years ago when New Zealand broke off from Gondwana, while the ancestors of the genera Nestor and Strigops diverged from each other between 60 and 80 million years ago.

Common name	Binomial	Notes
Norfolk kākā	Nestor productus	extinct, Norfolk Island

== Cockatoos ==
Order: Psittaciformes Family: Cacatuidae

14 species recorded [14 extant native]
The cockatoos share many features with other parrots including the characteristic curved beak shape and a zygodactyl foot, with two forward toes and two backwards toes. They differ, however in a number of characteristics, including the often spectacular movable headcrest.

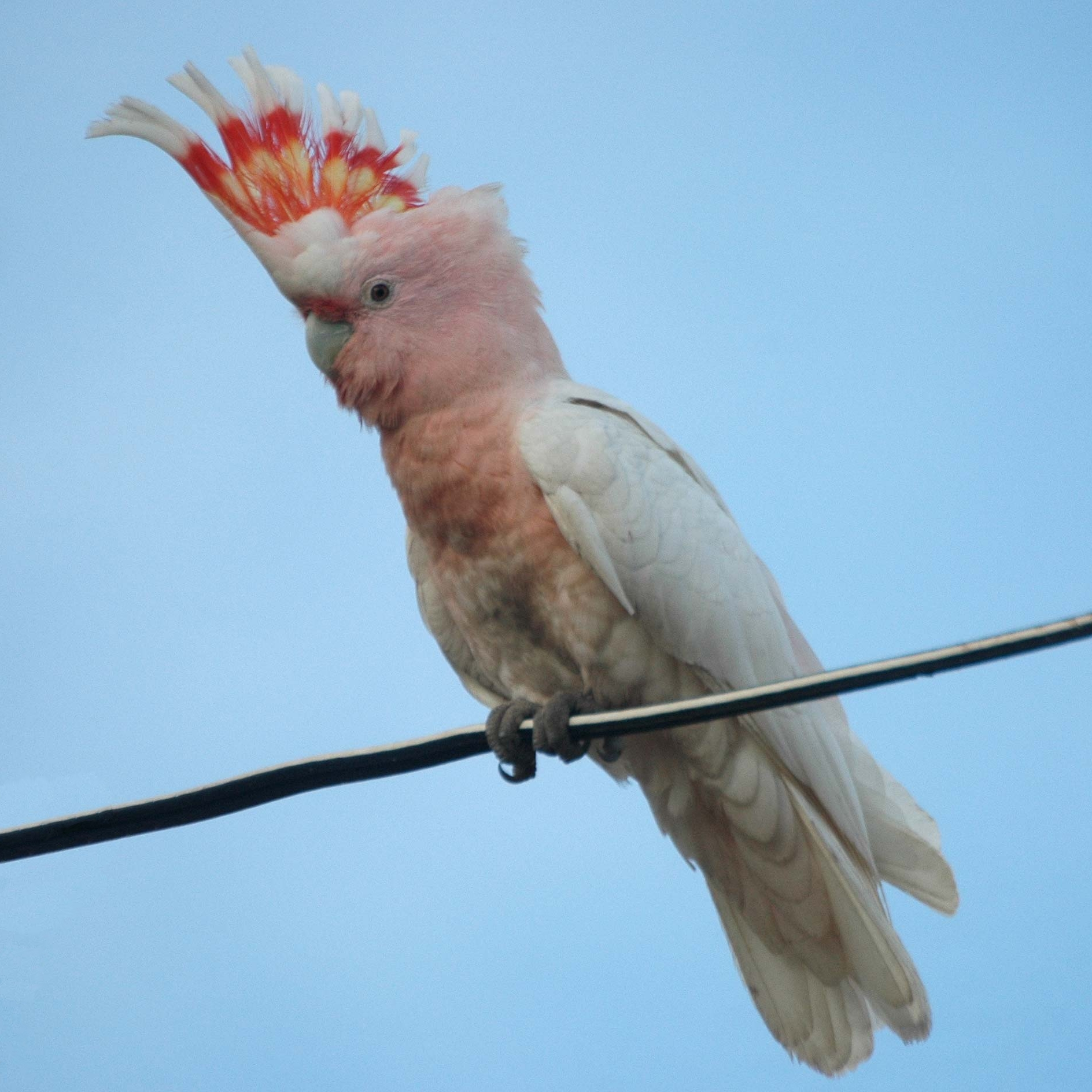
Pink cockatoo

Common name	Binomial	Notes
Palm cockatoo	Probosciger aterrimus	
Red-tailed black-cockatoo	Calyptorhynchus banksii	
Glossy black-cockatoo	Calyptorhynchus lathami	
Yellow-tailed black-cockatoo	Zanda funerea	
Carnaby's black-cockatoo	Zanda latirostris	
Baudin's black-cockatoo	Zanda baudinii	
Gang-gang cockatoo	Callocephalon fimbriatum	
Pink cockatoo	Lophochroa leadbeateri	
Galah	Eolophus roseicapilla	
Long-billed corella	Cacatua tenuirostris	
Western corella	Cacatua pastinator	
Little corella	Cacatua sanguinea	
Sulphur-crested cockatoo	Cacatua galerita	
Cockatiel	Nymphicus hollandicus	

== Old World parrots ==
Order: Psittaciformes Family: Psittaculidae

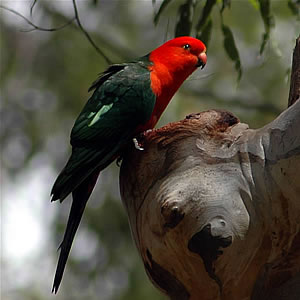
Australian king-parrot (male)

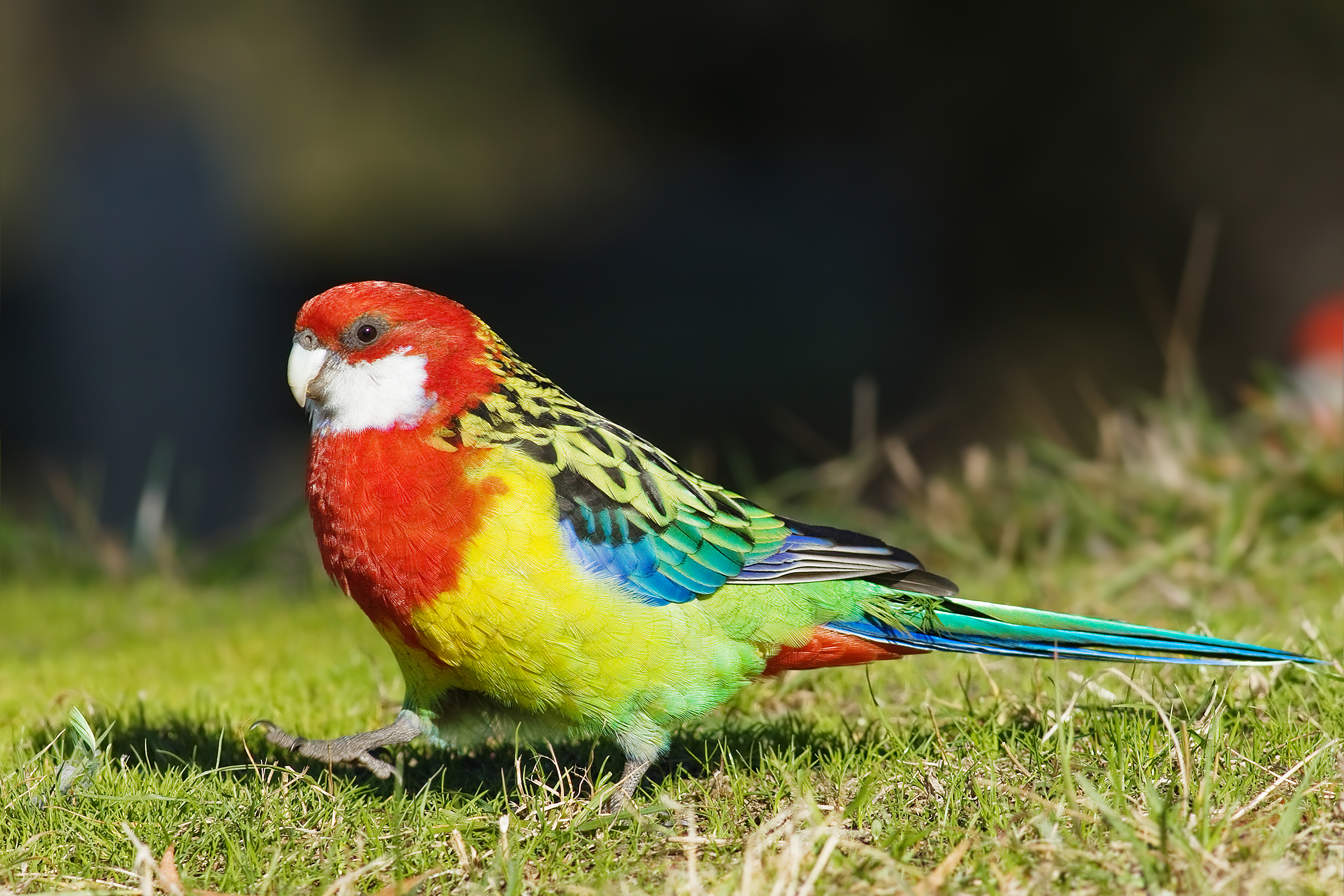
Eastern rosella (female)

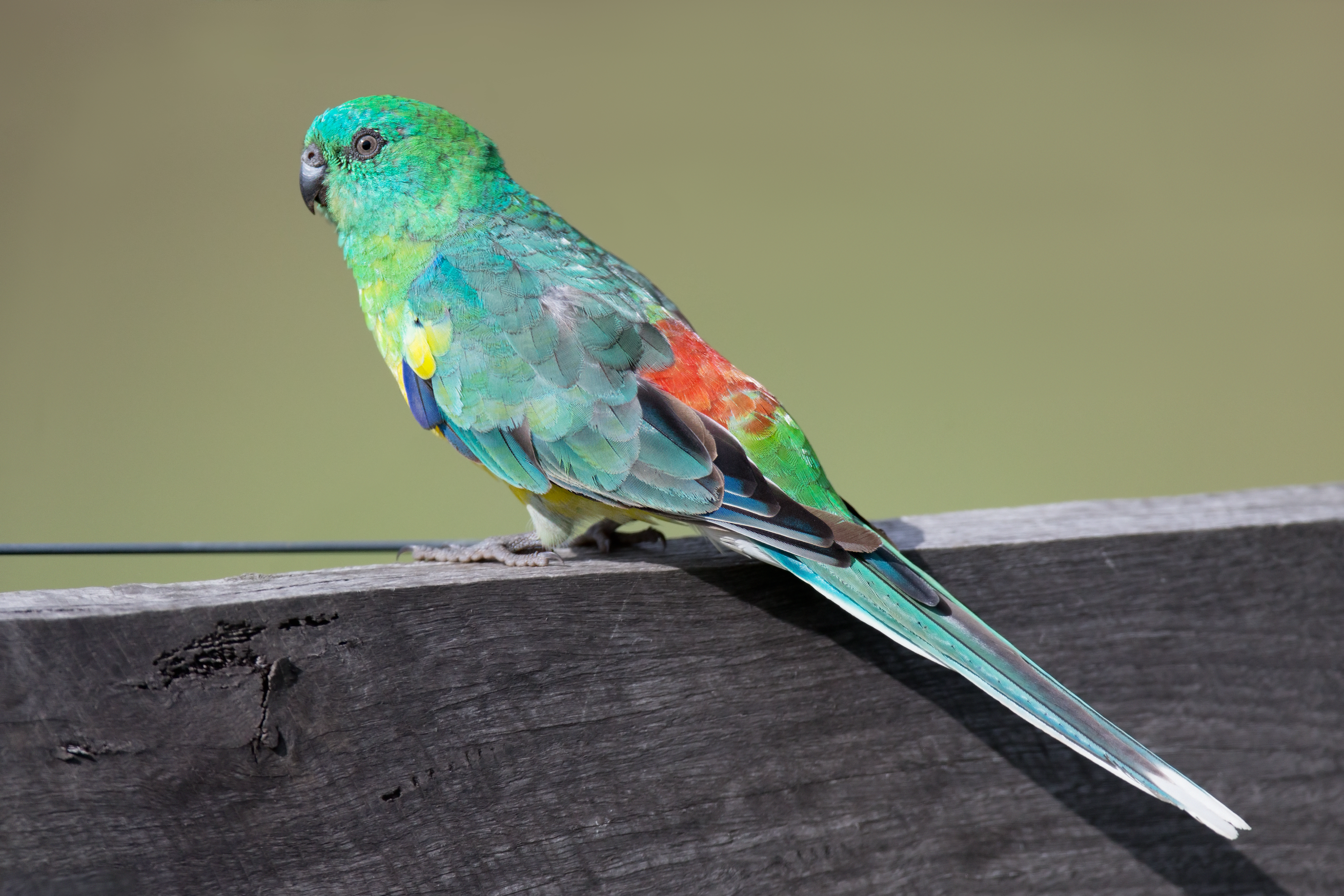
Red-rumped parrot (male)

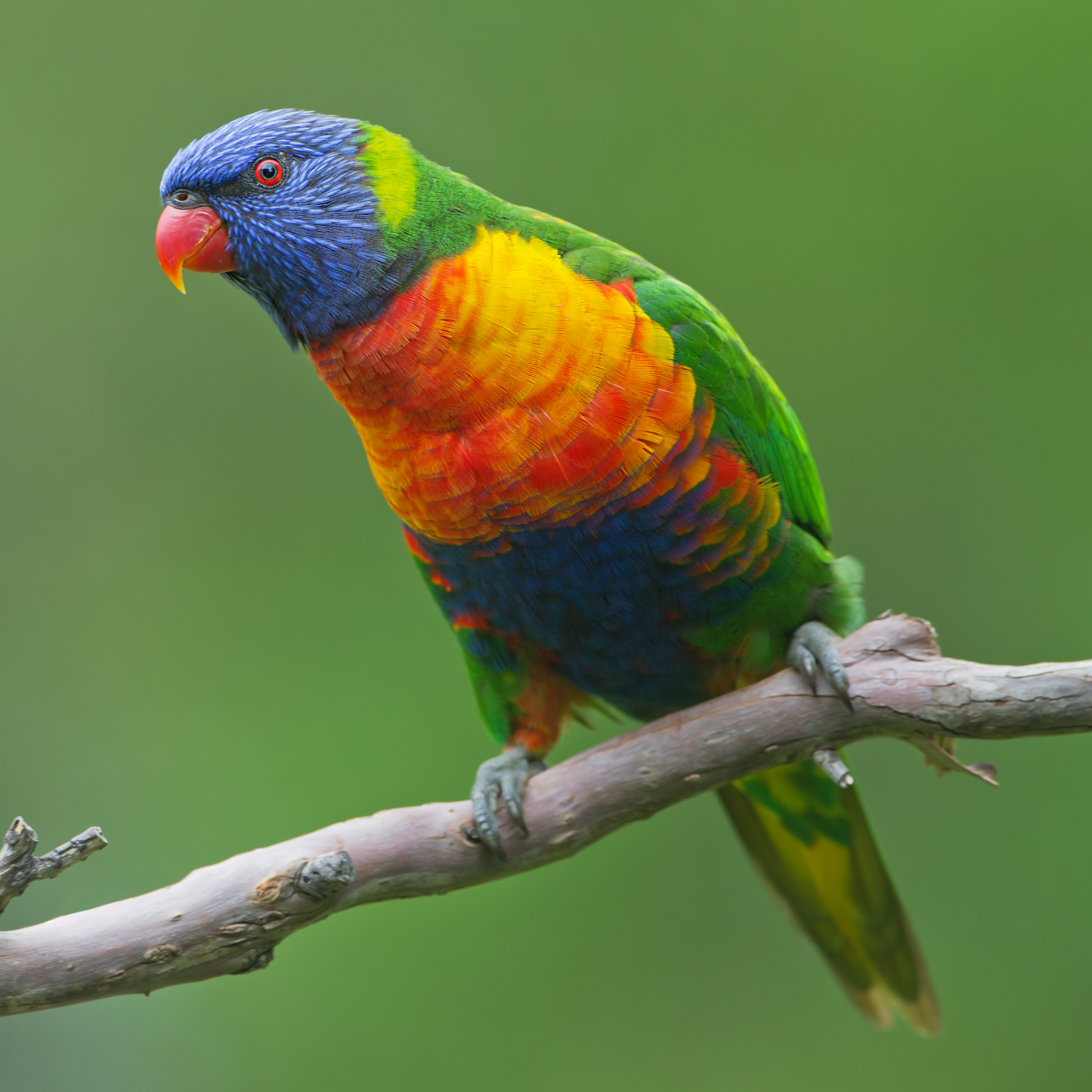
Rainbow lorikeet

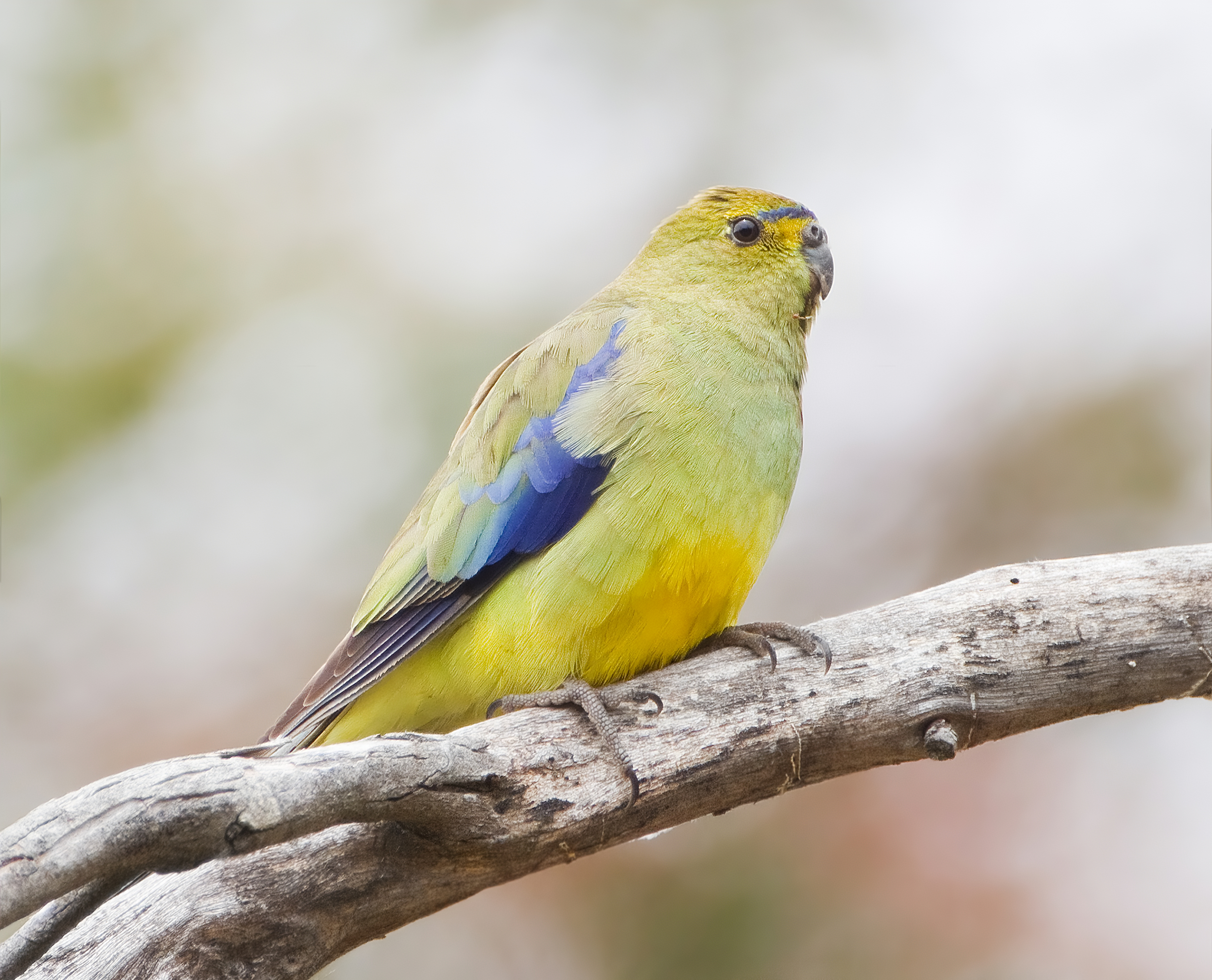
Blue-winged parrot

44 species recorded [42 extant native, 1 extirpated native, 1 extinct native]
Characteristic features of parrots include a strong curved bill, an upright stance, strong legs, and clawed zygodactyl feet. Many parrots are vividly coloured, and some are multi-coloured. In size they range from 8 cm (3.1 in) to 1 m (3.3 ft) in length. Old World parrots are found from Africa east across south and southeast Asia and Oceania to Australia and New Zealand.

Common name	Binomial	Notes
Superb parrot	Polytelis swainsonii	
Regent parrot	Polytelis anthopeplus	
Princess parrot	Polytelis alexandrae	
Australian king-parrot	Alisterus scapularis	
Red-winged parrot	Aprosmictus erythropterus	
Eclectus parrot	Eclectus roratus	
Red-cheeked parrot	Geoffroyus geoffroyi	
Ground parrot	Pezoporus wallicus	
Night parrot	Pezoporus occidentalis	
Bourke's parrot	Neopsephotus bourkii	
Blue-winged parrot	Neophema chrysostoma	
Elegant parrot	Neophema elegans	
Rock parrot	Neophema petrophila	
Orange-bellied parrot	Neophema chrysogaster	
Turquoise parrot	Neophema pulchella	
Scarlet-chested parrot	Neophema splendida	
Swift parrot	Lathamus discolor	
Red-crowned parakeet	Cyanoramphus novaezelandiae	extirpated, Macquarie Island
Norfolk Island parakeet	Cyanoramphus cookii	Norfolk Island
Australian ringneck	Barnardius zonarius	
Green rosella	Platycercus caledonicus	
Crimson rosella	Platycercus elegans	
Yellow rosella	Platycercus elegans flaveolus	
Northern rosella	Platycercus venustus	
Eastern rosella	Platycercus eximius	
Pale-headed rosella	Platycercus adscitus	
Western rosella	Platycercus icterotis	
Greater bluebonnet	Northiella haematogaster	
Naretha bluebonnet	Northiella narethae	
Red-rumped parrot	Psephotus haematonotus	
Mulga parrot	Psephotellus varius	
Hooded parrot	Psephotellus dissimilis	
Golden-shouldered parrot	Psephotellus chrysopterygius	
Paradise parrot	Psephotellus pulcherrimus	extinct
Red-capped parrot	Purpureicephalus spurius	
Double-eyed fig-parrot	Cyclopsitta diophthalma	
Budgerigar	Melopsittacus undulatus	
Musk lorikeet	Glossopsitta concinna	
Little lorikeet	Parvipsitta pusilla	
Purple-crowned lorikeet	Parvipsitta porphyrocephala	
Varied lorikeet	Psitteuteles versicolor	
Coconut lorikeet	Trichoglossus haematodus	Torres Strait
Red-collared lorikeet	Trichoglossus rubritorquis	
Rainbow lorikeet	Trichoglossus moluccanus	
Scaly-breasted lorikeet	Trichoglossus chlorolepidotus	

== Pittas ==
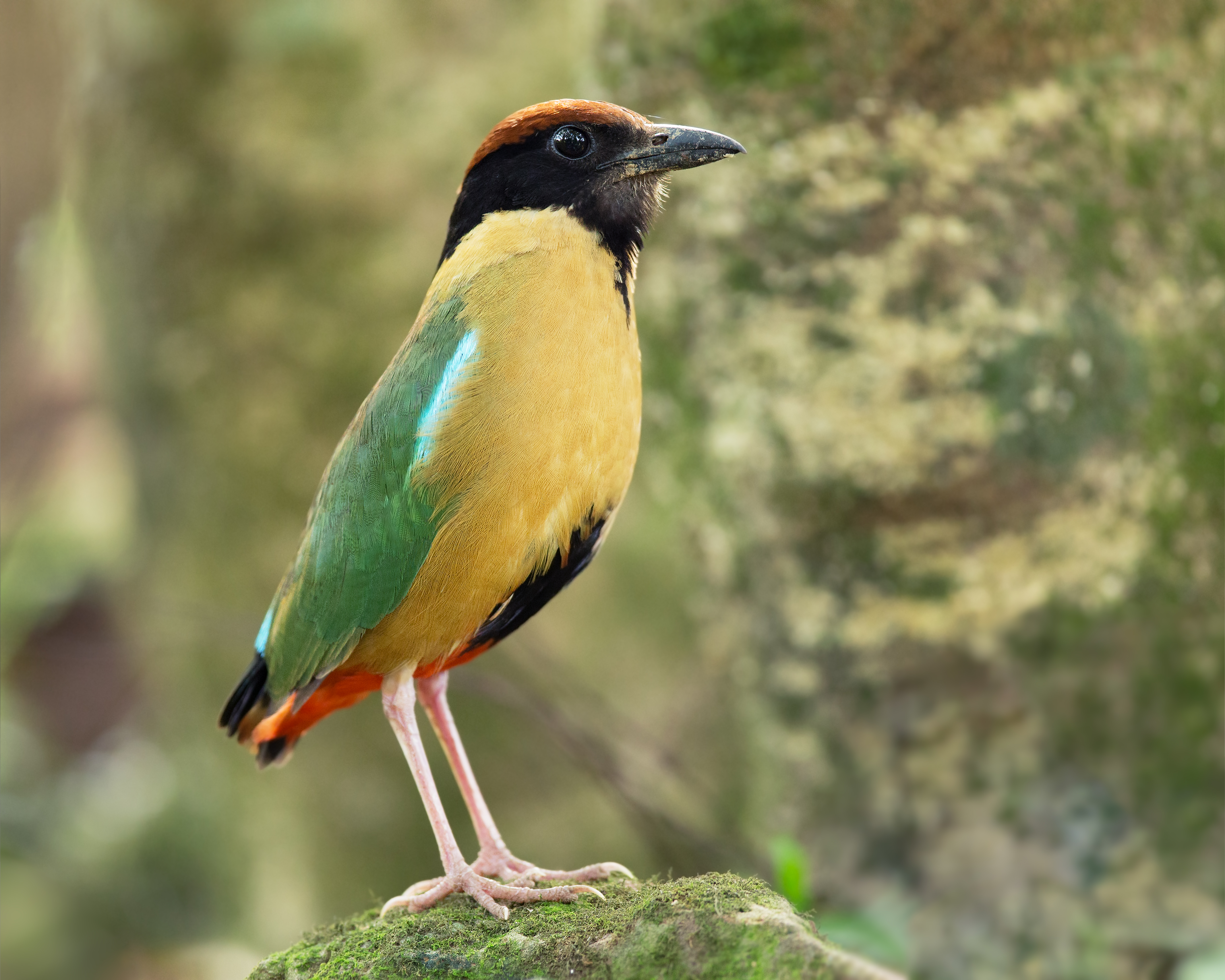
Noisy pitta

Order: Passeriformes Family: Pittidae

6 species recorded [3 extant native, 3 vagrant]
Pittas are medium-sized by passerine standards and are stocky, with fairly long, strong legs, short tails, and stout bills. Many are brightly coloured. They spend the majority of their time on wet forest floors, eating snails, insects, and similar invertebrates.

Common name	Binomial	Notes
Papuan pitta	Erythropitta macklotii	
Blue-winged pitta	Pitta moluccensis	vagrant
Fairy pitta	Pitta nympha	vagrant
Hooded pitta	Pitta sordida	vagrant, Barrow Island, WA
Noisy pitta	Pitta versicolor	
Rainbow pitta	Pitta iris	

== Lyrebirds ==
Order: Passeriformes Family: Menuridae

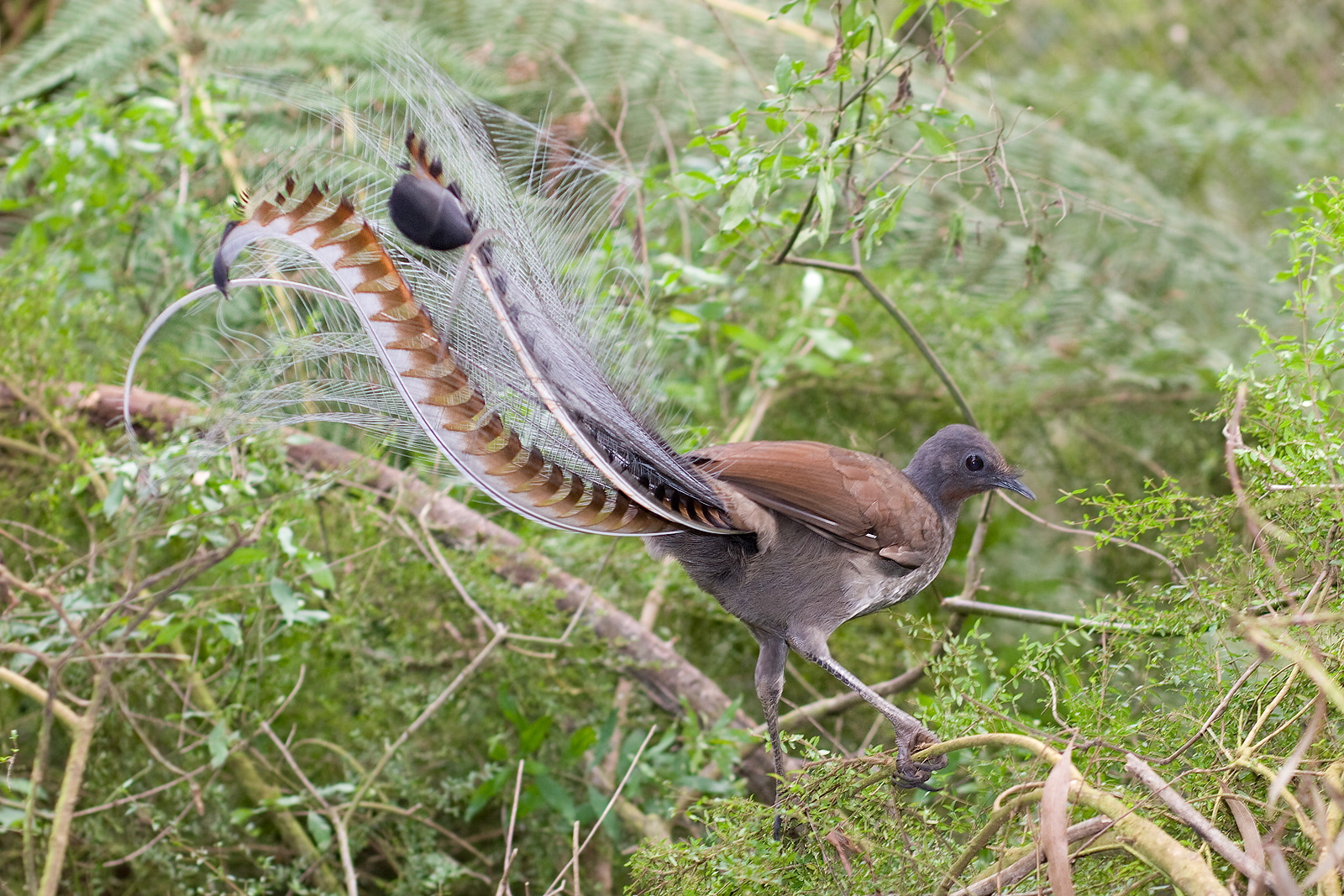
Superb lyrebird

2 species recorded [2 extant native]
Lyrebirds are most notable for their superb ability to mimic natural and artificial sounds from their environment, and the striking beauty of the male bird's huge tail when it is fanned out in courtship display.

Common name	Binomial	Notes
Albert's lyrebird	Menura alberti	
Superb lyrebird	Menura novaehollandiae	

== Scrub-birds ==
Order: Passeriformes Family: Atrichornithidae

2 species recorded [2 extant native]
The scrub-bird family is ancient and is understood to be most closely related to the lyrebirds, and probably also the bowerbirds and treecreepers.

Common name	Binomial	Notes
Rufous scrub-bird	Atrichornis rufescens	
Noisy scrub-bird	Atrichornis clamosus	

== Bowerbirds ==
Order: Passeriformes Family: Ptilonorhynchidae

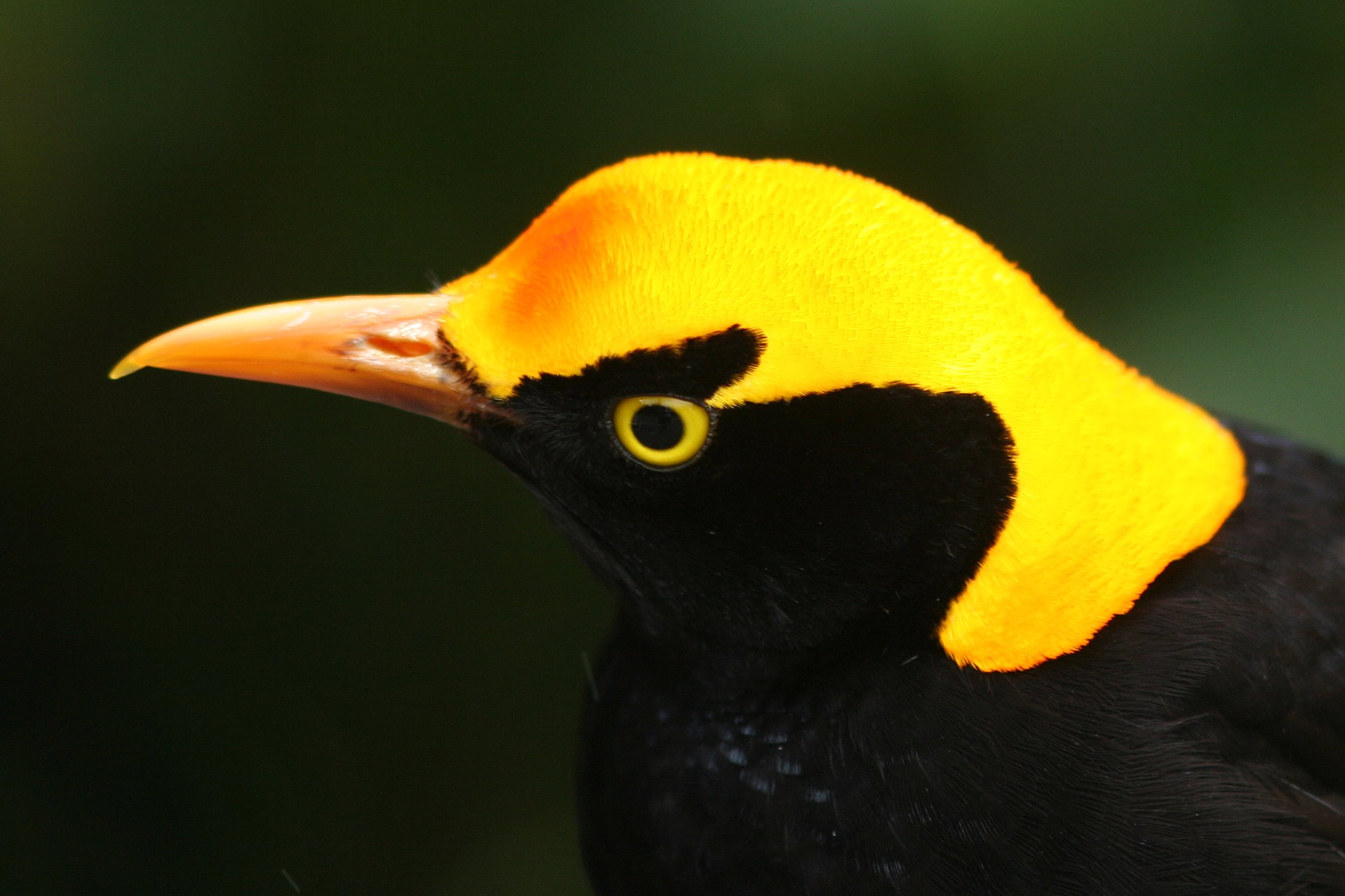
Regent bowerbird

11 species recorded [11 extant native]
The bowerbirds are small to medium-sized passerine birds. The males notably build a bower to attract a mate. Depending on the species, the bower ranges from a circle of cleared earth with a small pile of twigs in the centre to a complex and highly decorated structure of sticks and leaves.

Common name	Binomial	Notes
Spotted catbird	Ailuroedus maculosus	
Black-eared catbird	Ailuroedus melanotis	
Green catbird	Ailuroedus crassirostris	
Tooth-billed bowerbird	Scenopoeetes dentirostris	
Golden bowerbird	Amblyornis newtonianus	
Regent bowerbird	Sericulus chrysocephalus	
Satin bowerbird	Ptilonorhynchus violaceus	
Western bowerbird	Ptilonorhynchus guttatus	
Spotted bowerbird	Ptilonorhynchus maculatus	
Great bowerbird	Ptilonorhynchus nuchalis	
Fawn-breasted bowerbird	Ptilonorhynchus cerviniventris	

== Australasian treecreepers ==
Order: Passeriformes Family: Climacteridae

6 species recorded [6 extant native]
The Climacteridae are medium-small, mostly brown-coloured birds with patterning on their underparts.

Common name	Binomial	Notes
White-throated treecreeper	Cormobates leucophaea	
White-browed treecreeper	Climacteris affinis	
Red-browed treecreeper	Climacteris erythrops	
Brown treecreeper	Climacteris picumnus	
Black-tailed treecreeper	Climacteris melanura	
Rufous treecreeper	Climacteris rufa	

== Fairywrens ==
Order: Passeriformes Family: Maluridae

26 species recorded [26 extant native]
Maluridae is a family of small, insectivorous passerine birds endemic to Australia and New Guinea. They are socially monogamous and sexually promiscuous, meaning that although they form pairs between one male and one female, each partner will mate with other individuals and even assist in raising the young from such pairings.

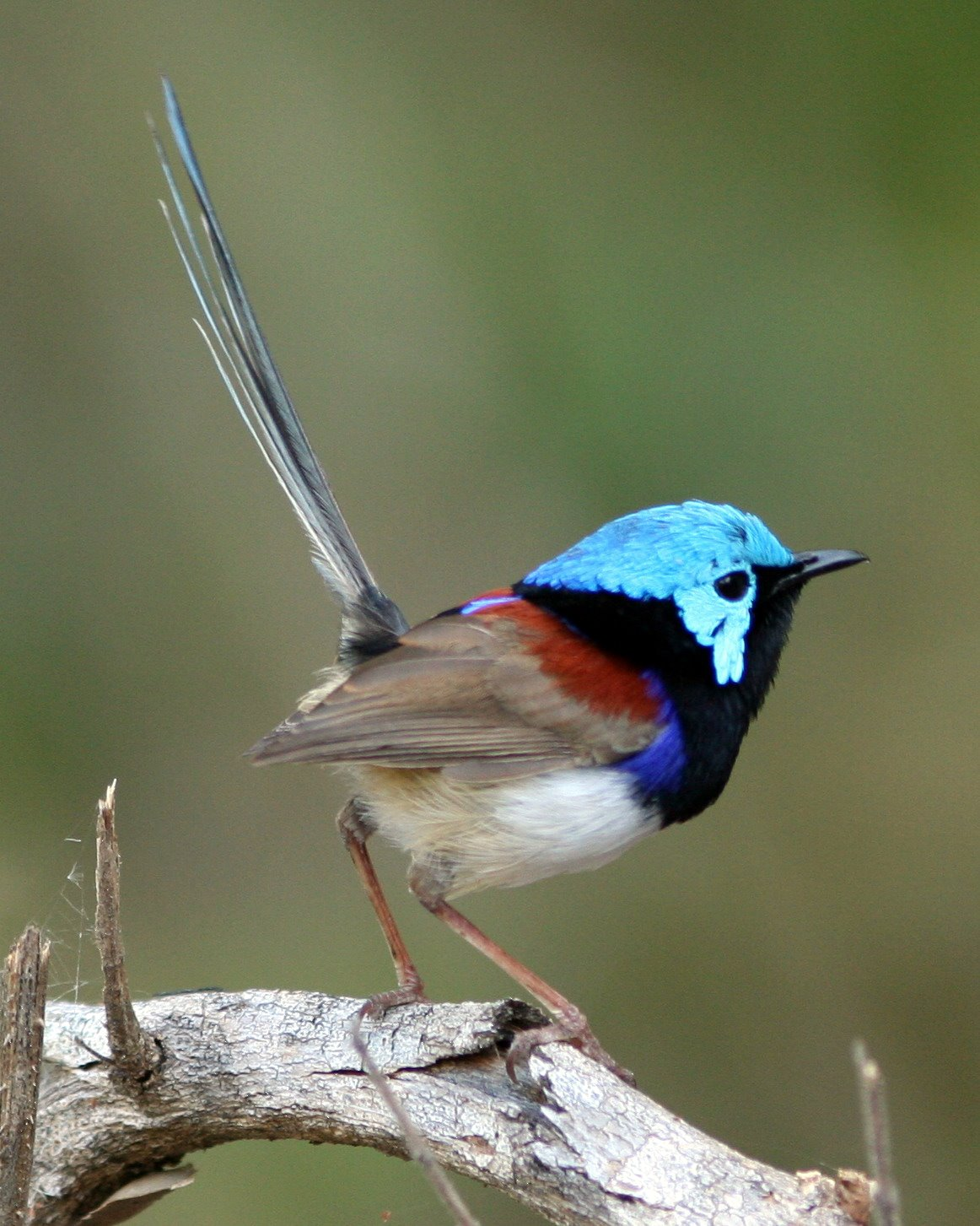
Variegated fairywren

Common name	Binomial	Notes
Grey grasswren	Amytornis barbatus	
Rufous grasswren	Amytornis whitei	
Opalton grasswren	Amytornis rowleyi	
Striated grasswren	Amytornis striatus	
White-throated grasswren	Amytornis woodwardi	
Carpentarian grasswren	Amytornis dorotheae	
Short-tailed grasswren	Amytornis merrotsyi	
Western grasswren	Amytornis textilis	
Thick-billed grasswren	Amytornis modestus	
Black grasswren	Amytornis housei	
Eyrean grasswren	Amytornis goyderi	
Dusky grasswren	Amytornis purnelli	
Kalkadoon grasswren	Amytornis ballarae	
Southern emuwren	Stipiturus malachurus	
Rufous-crowned emuwren	Stipiturus ruficeps	
Mallee emuwren	Stipiturus mallee	
Purple-crowned fairywren	Malurus coronatus	
Red-winged fairywren	Malurus elegans	
Blue-breasted fairywren	Malurus pulcherrimus	
Purple-backed fairywren	Malurus assimilis	
Variegated fairywren	Malurus lamberti	
Lovely fairywren	Malurus amabilis	
Splendid fairywren	Malurus splendens	
Superb fairywren	Malurus cyaneus	
White-winged fairywren	Malurus leucopterus	
Red-backed fairywren	Malurus melanocephalus	

== Honeyeaters ==
Order: Passeriformes Family: Meliphagidae

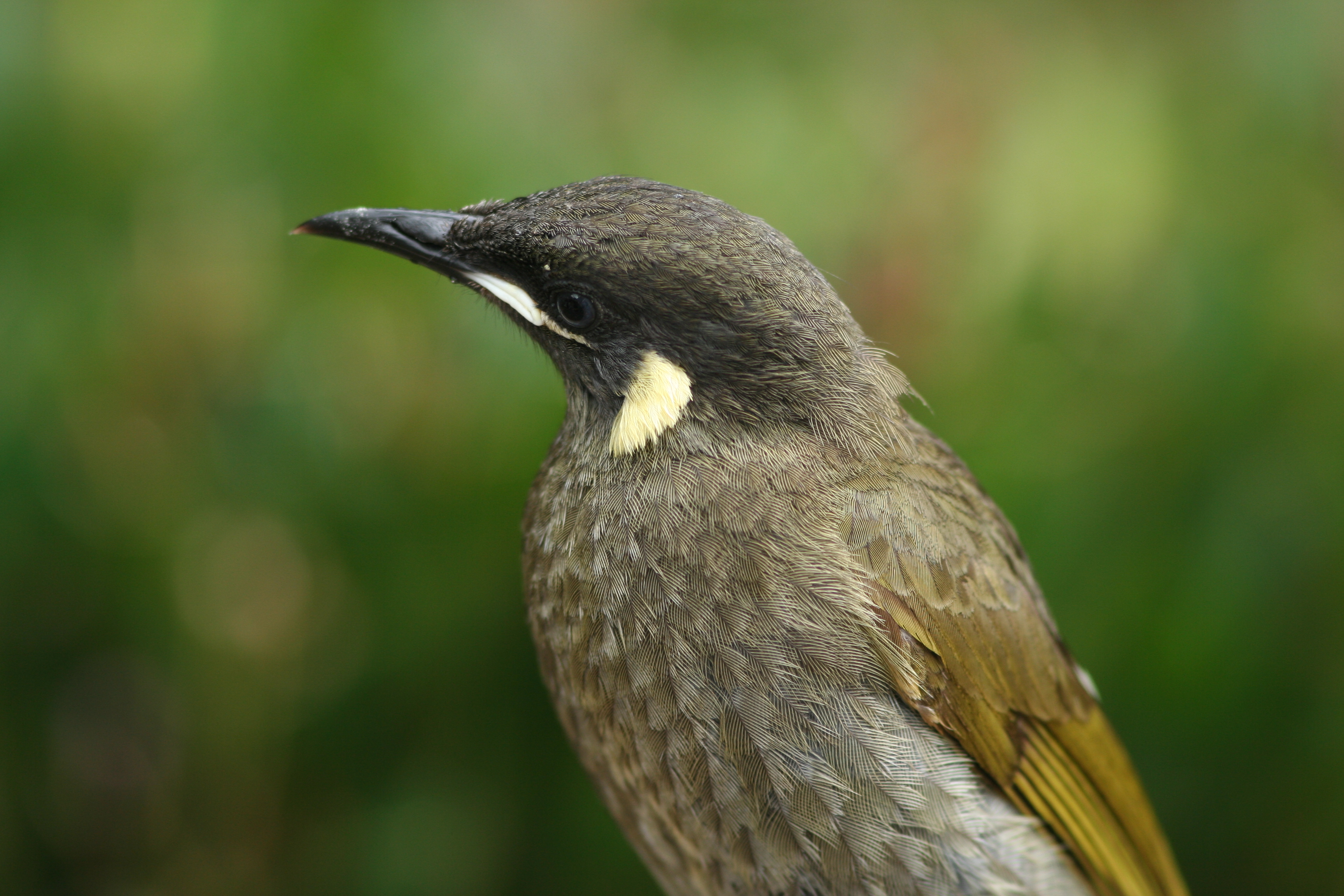
Lewin's honeyeater

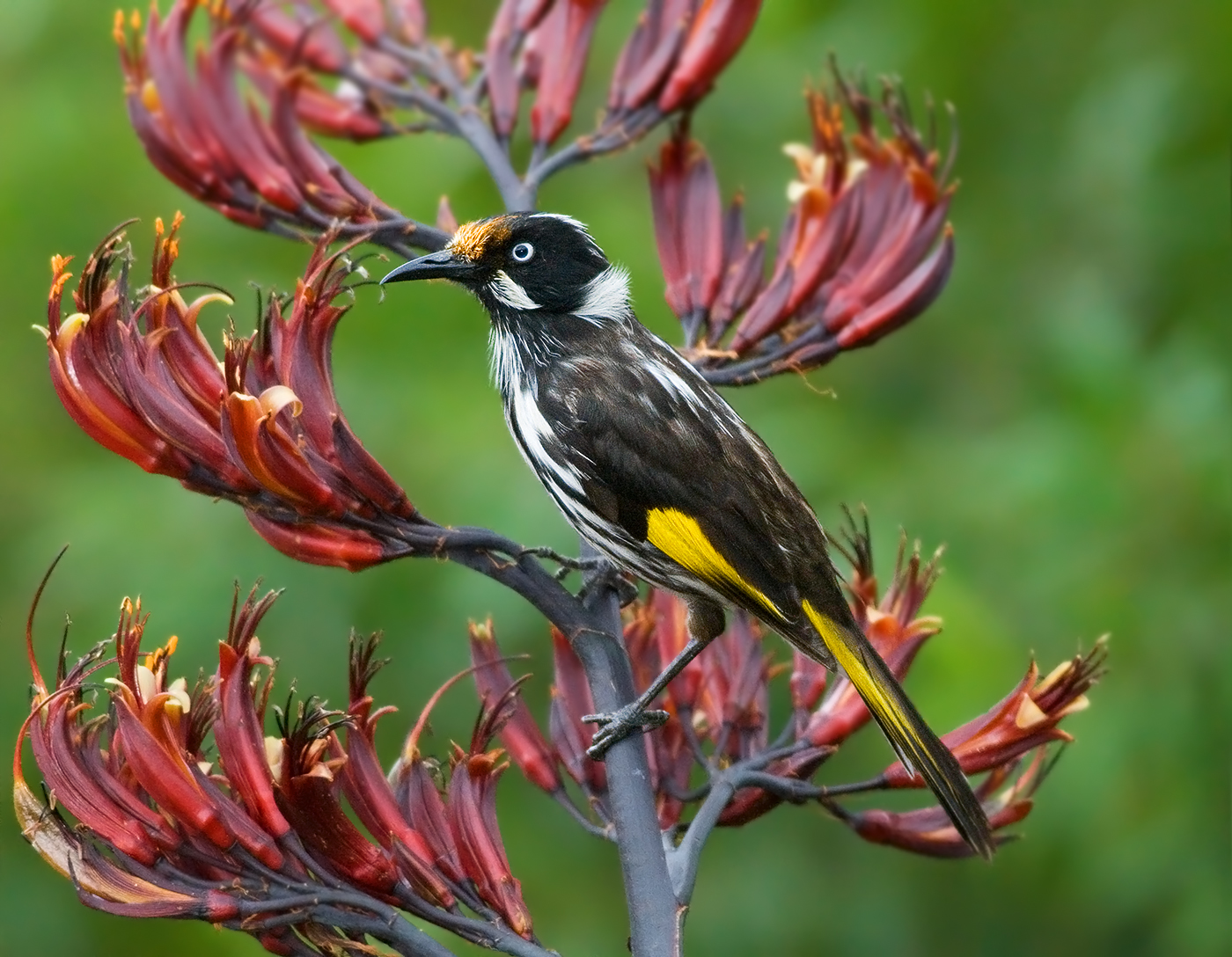
New Holland honeyeater

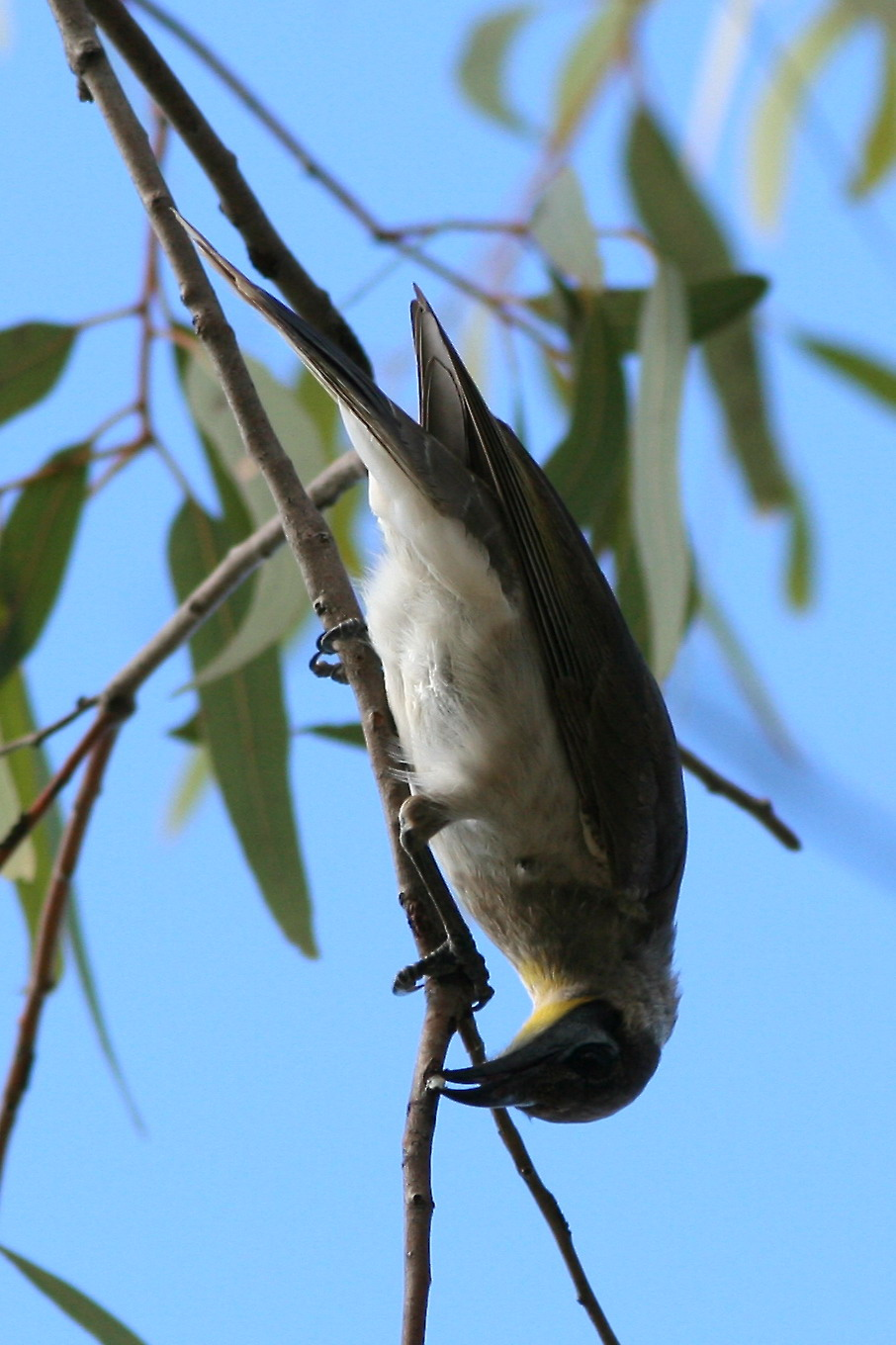
Little friarbird

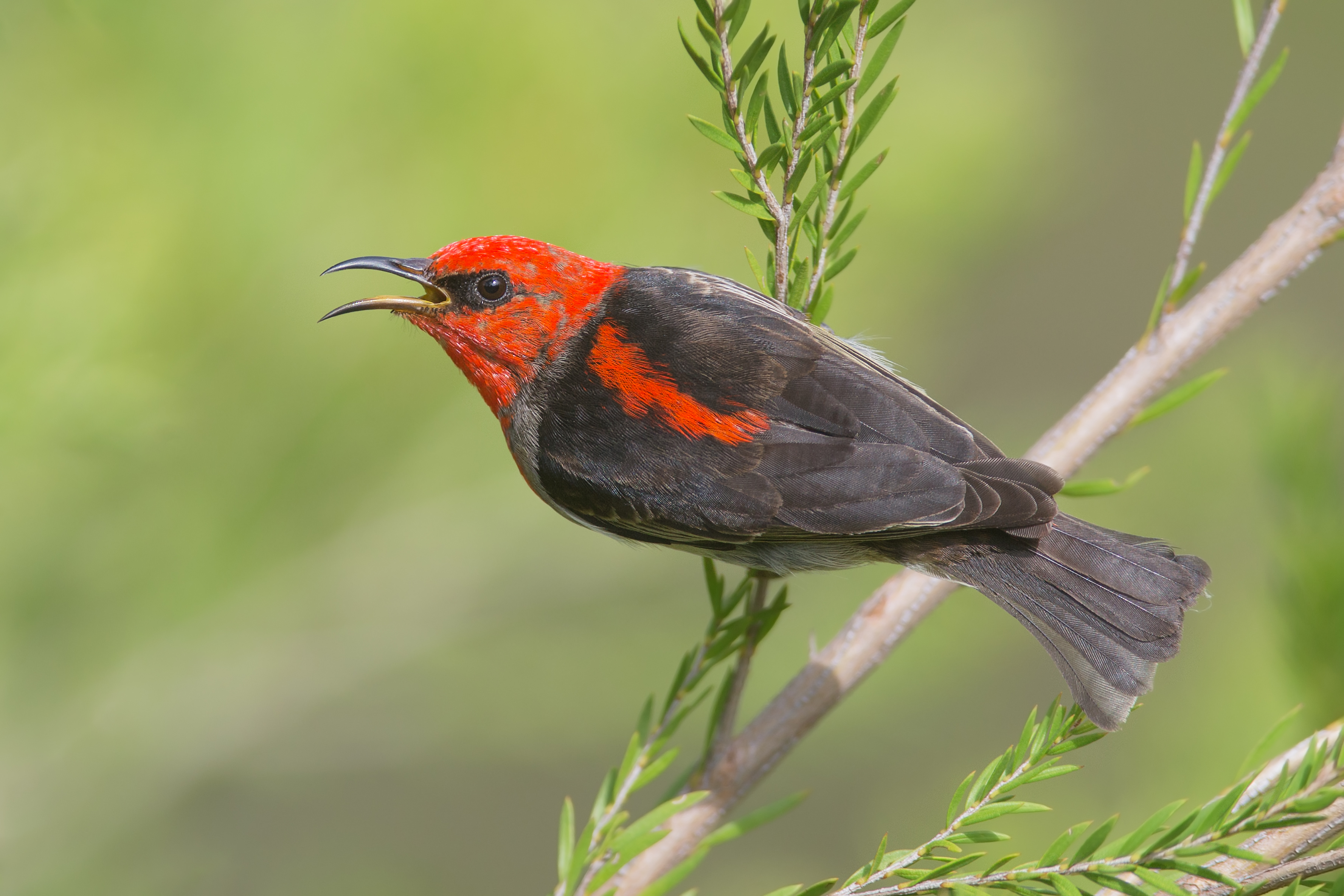
Scarlet myzomela

76 species recorded [76 extant native]
The honeyeaters are a large and diverse family of small to medium-sized birds most common in Australia and New Guinea. They are nectar feeders and closely resemble other nectar-feeding passerines.

Common name	Binomial	Notes
Eastern spinebill	Acanthorhynchus tenuirostris	
Western spinebill	Acanthorhynchus superciliosus	
Pied honeyeater	Certhionyx variegatus	
Yellow-spotted honeyeater	Meliphaga notata	
Lewin's honeyeater	Meliphaga lewinii	
White-lined honeyeater	Territornis albilineata	
Kimberley honeyeater	Territornis fordiana	
Graceful honeyeater	Microptilotis gracilis	
Cryptic honeyeater	Microptilotis imitatrix	
Yellow honeyeater	Stomiopera flava	
White-gaped honeyeater	Stomiopera unicolor	
White-fronted honeyeater	Purnella albifrons	
Yellow-faced honeyeater	Caligavis chrysops	
Yellow-tufted honeyeater	Lichenostomus melanops	
Purple-gaped honeyeater	Lichenostomus cratitius	
Bell miner	Manorina melanophrys	
Noisy miner	Manorina melanocephala	
Yellow-throated miner	Manorina flavigula	
Black-eared miner	Manorina melanotis	
Bridled honeyeater	Bolemoreus frenatus	
Eungella honeyeater	Bolemoreus hindwoodi	
Spiny-cheeked honeyeater	Acanthagenys rufogularis	
Little wattlebird	Anthochaera chrysoptera	
Western wattlebird	Anthochaera lunulata	
Regent honeyeater	Anthochaera phrygia	
Red wattlebird	Anthochaera carunculata	
Yellow wattlebird	Anthochaera paradoxa	
Varied honeyeater	Gavicalis versicolor	
Mangrove honeyeater	Gavicalis fasciogularis	
Singing honeyeater	Gavicalis virescens	
Yellow-plumed honeyeater	Ptilotula ornata	
White-plumed honeyeater	Ptilotula penicillata	
Yellow-tinted honeyeater	Ptilotula flavescens	
Fuscous honeyeater	Ptilotula fusca	
Grey-headed honeyeater	Ptilotula keartlandi	
Grey-fronted honeyeater	Ptilotula plumula	
Brown-backed honeyeater	Ramsayornis modestus	
Bar-breasted honeyeater	Ramsayornis fasciatus	
Rufous-banded honeyeater	Conopophila albogularis	
Rufous-throated honeyeater	Conopophila rufogularis	
Grey honeyeater	Conopophila whitei	
Gibberbird	Ashbyia lovensis	
Yellow chat	Epthianura crocea	
Crimson chat	Epthianura tricolor	
Orange chat	Epthianura aurifrons	
White-fronted chat	Epthianura albifrons	
Black honeyeater	Sugomel nigrum	
Dusky honeyeater	Myzomela obscura	
Red-headed honeyeater	Myzomela erythrocephala	
Scarlet honeyeater	Myzomela sanguinolenta	
Tawny-crowned honeyeater	Gliciphila melanops	
Green-backed honeyeater	Glycichaera fallax	
Banded honeyeater	Cissomela pectoralis	
Brown honeyeater	Lichmera indistincta	
Crescent honeyeater	Phylidonyris pyrrhoptera	
New Holland honeyeater	Phylidonyris novaehollandiae	
White-cheeked honeyeater	Phylidonyris niger	
White-streaked honeyeater	Trichodere cockerelli	
White-eared honeyeater	Nesoptilotis leucotis	
Yellow-throated honeyeater	Nesoptilotis flavicollis	
Blue-faced honeyeater	Entomyzon cyanotis	
White-throated honeyeater	Melithreptus albogularis	
Gilbert's honeyeater	Melithreptus chloropsis	
White-naped honeyeater	Melithreptus lunatus	
Black-headed honeyeater	Melithreptus affinis	
Brown-headed honeyeater	Melithreptus brevirostris	
Black-chinned honeyeater	Melithreptus gularis	
Strong-billed honeyeater	Melithreptus validirostris	
Tawny-breasted honeyeater	Xanthotis flaviventer	
Macleay's honeyeater	Xanthotis macleayana	
Striped honeyeater	Plectorhyncha lanceolata	
Painted honeyeater	Grantiella picta	
Little friarbird	Philemon citreogularis	
Helmeted friarbird	Philemon buceroides	
Silver-crowned friarbird	Philemon argenticeps	
Noisy friarbird	Philemon corniculatus	

== Bristlebirds ==
Order: Passeriformes Family: Dasyornithidae

3 species recorded [3 extant native]
Bristlebirds are long-tailed, sedentary, ground-frequenting birds. The common name of the family is derived from the presence of prominent rictal bristles - three stiff, hair-like feathers curving downwards on either side of the gape.

Common name	Binomial	Notes
Western bristlebird	Dasyornis longirostris	
Eastern bristlebird	Dasyornis brachypterus	
Rufous bristlebird	Dasyornis broadbenti	

== Pardalotes ==
Order: Passeriformes Family: Pardalotidae

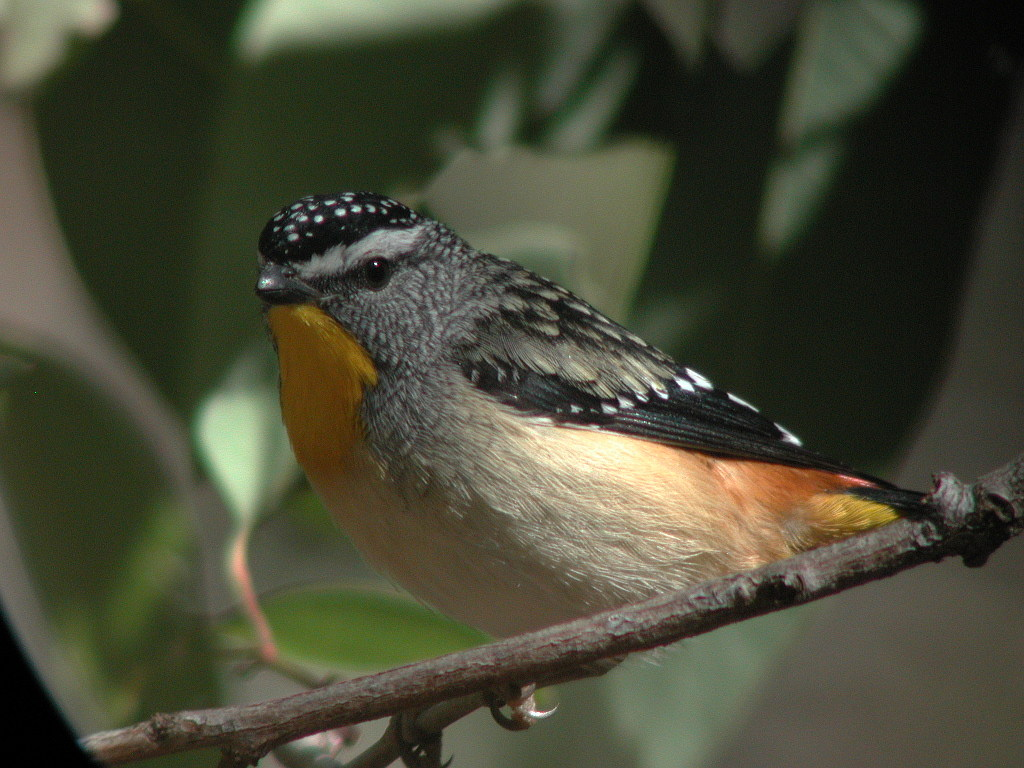
Spotted pardalote

4 species recorded [4 extant native]
Pardalotes spend most of their time high in the outer foliage of trees, feeding on insects, spiders, and above all lerps (a type of sap-sucking insect).

Common name	Binomial	Notes
Spotted pardalote	Pardalotus punctatus	
Forty-spotted pardalote	Pardalotus quadragintus	
Red-browed pardalote	Pardalotus rubricatus	
Striated pardalote	Pardalotus striatus	

== Thornbills and allies ==
Order: Passeriformes Family: Acanthizidae

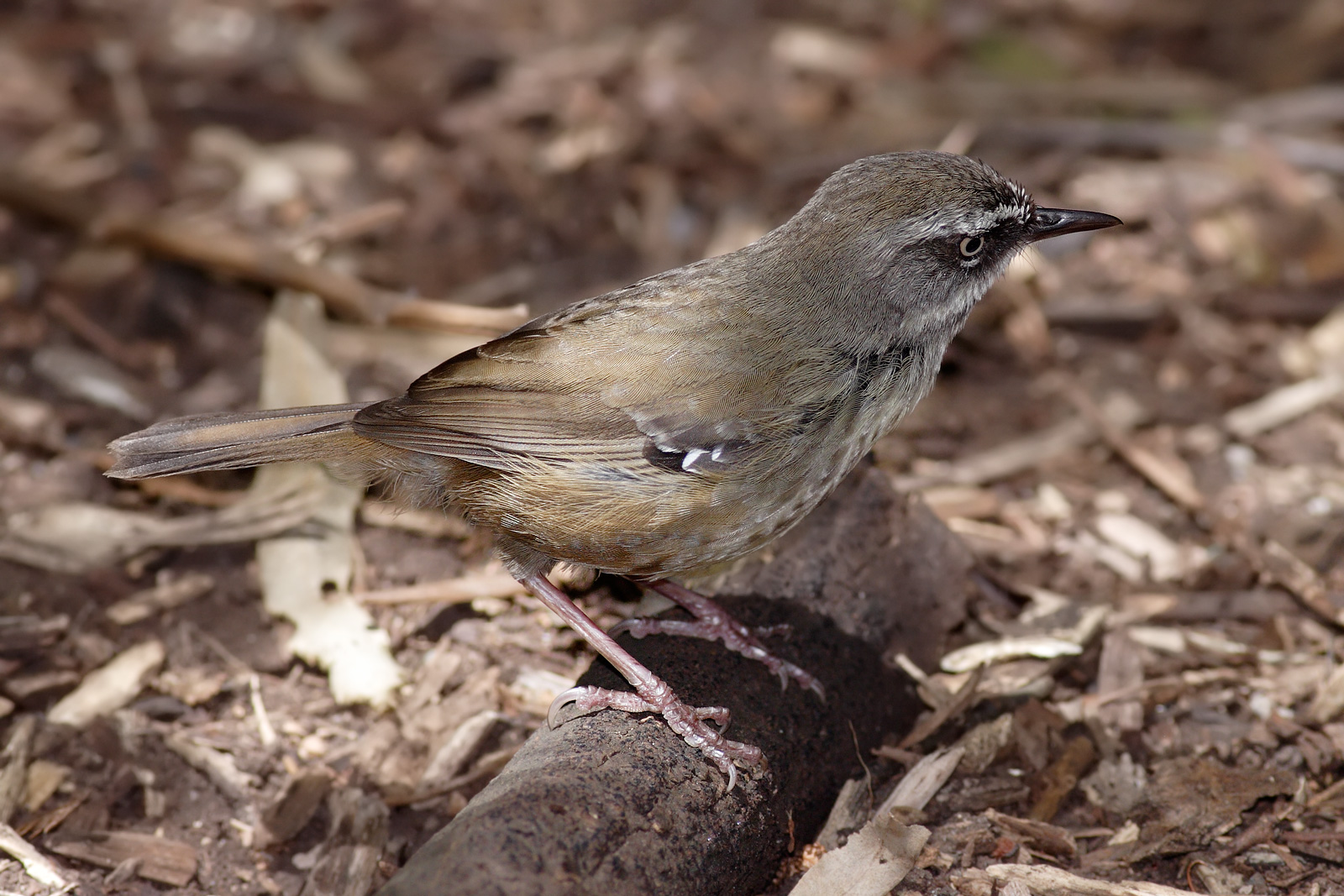
White-browed scrubwren

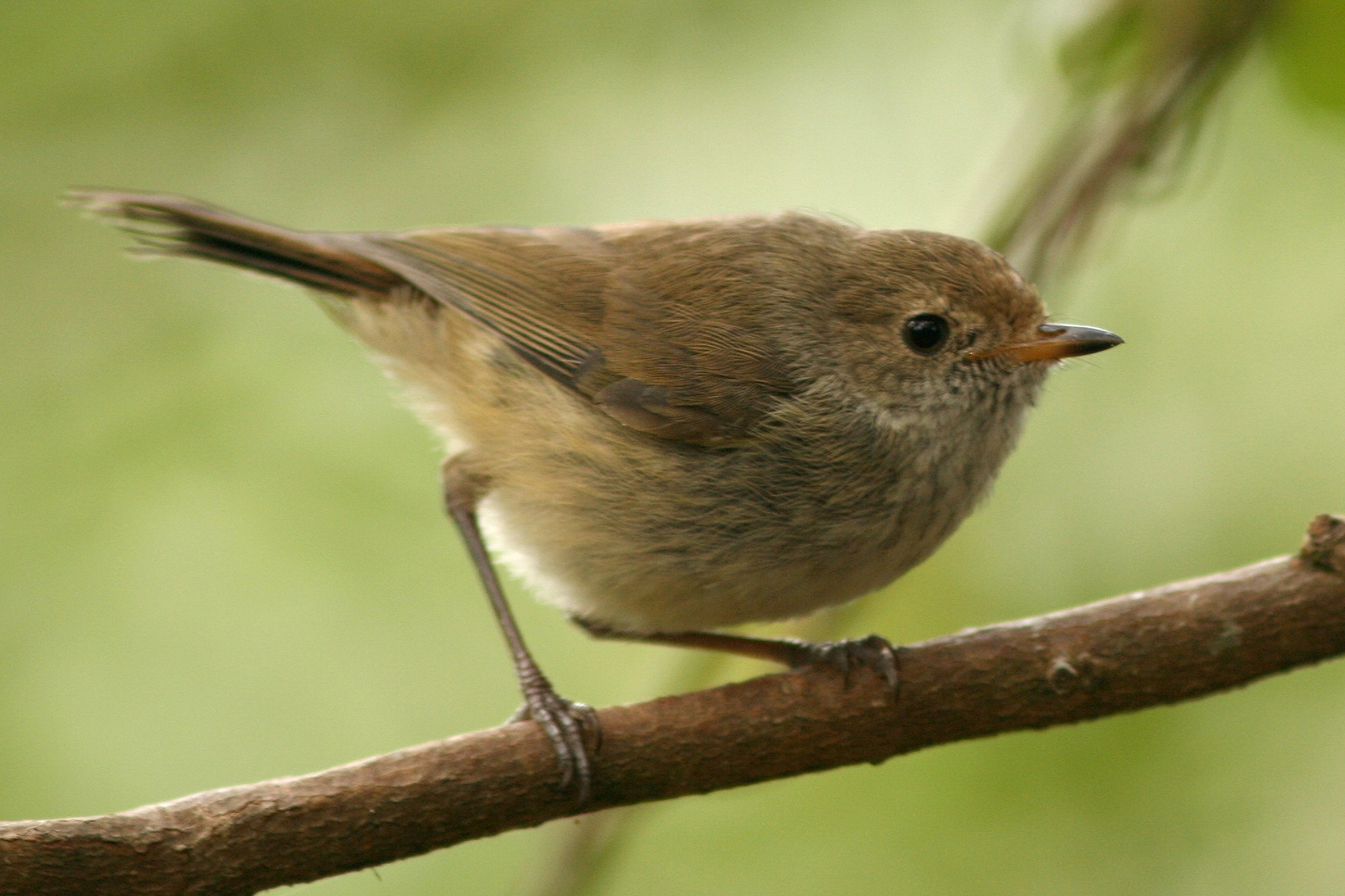
Brown thornbill

45 species recorded [44 extant native, 1 extinct native]
Thornbills are small passerine birds, similar in habits to the tits.

Common name	Binomial	Notes
Pilotbird	Pycnoptilus floccosus	
Rockwarbler	Origma solitaria	
Fernwren	Oreoscopus gutturalis	
Yellow-throated scrubwren	Neosericornis citreogularis	
White-browed scrubwren	Sericornis frontalis	
Spotted scrubwren	Sericornis maculatus	
Tasmanian scrubwren	Sericornis humilis	
Atherton scrubwren	Sericornis keri	
Tropical scrubwren	Sericornis beccarii	
Large-billed scrubwren	Sericornis magnirostra	
Scrubtit	Acanthornis magna	
Redthroat	Pyrrholaemus brunneus	
Speckled warbler	Pyrrholaemus sagittatus	
Rufous fieldwren	Calamanthus campestris	
Western fieldwren	Calamanthus montanellus	
Striated fieldwren	Calamanthus fuliginosus	
Chestnut-rumped heathwren	Hylacola pyrrhopygia	
Shy heathwren	Hylacola cauta	
Buff-rumped thornbill	Acanthiza reguloides	
Western thornbill	Acanthiza inornata	
Slender-billed thornbill	Acanthiza iredalei	
Mountain thornbill	Acanthiza katherina	
Brown thornbill	Acanthiza pusilla	
Tasmanian thornbill	Acanthiza ewingii	
Inland thornbill	Acanthiza apicalis	
Yellow-rumped thornbill	Acanthiza chrysorrhoa	
Chestnut-rumped thornbill	Acanthiza uropygialis	
Slaty-backed thornbill	Acanthiza robustirostris	
Yellow thornbill	Acanthiza nana	
Striated thornbill	Acanthiza lineata	
Weebill	Smicrornis brevirostris	
Green-backed gerygone	Gerygone chloronota	
Fairy gerygone	Gerygone palpebrosa	
White-throated gerygone	Gerygone olivacea	
Yellow-bellied gerygone	Gerygone chrysogaster	
Large-billed gerygone	Gerygone magnirostris	
Dusky gerygone	Gerygone tenebrosa	
Brown gerygone	Gerygone mouki	
Western gerygone	Gerygone fusca	
Mangrove gerygone	Gerygone levigaster	
Norfolk Island gerygone	Gerygone modesta	Norfolk Island
Lord Howe gerygone	Gerygone insularis	extinct, Lord Howe Island
Southern whiteface	Aphelocephala leucopsis	
Chestnut-breasted whiteface	Aphelocephala pectoralis	
Banded whiteface	Aphelocephala nigricincta	

== Pseudo-babblers ==
Order: Passeriformes Family: Pomatostomidae

4 species recorded [4 extant native]
The pseudo-babblers are small to medium-sized birds endemic to Australia and New Guinea. They are ground-feeding omnivores and highly social.

Common name	Binomial	Notes
Grey-crowned babbler	Pomatostomus temporalis	
White-browed babbler	Pomatostomus superciliosus	
Hall's babbler	Pomatostomus halli	
Chestnut-crowned babbler	Pomatostomus ruficeps	

== Logrunners ==
Order: Passeriformes Family: Orthonychidae

2 species recorded [2 extant native]
The Orthonychidae is a family of birds with a single genus, Orthonyx, which comprises two types of passerine birds endemic to Australia and New Guinea, the logrunners and the chowchilla. Both use stiffened tails to brace themselves when feeding.

Common name	Binomial	Notes
Australian logrunner	Orthonyx temminckii	
Chowchilla	Orthonyx spaldingii	

== Quail-thrushes and jewel-babblers ==
Order: Passeriformes Family: Cinclosomatidae

7 species recorded [7 extant native]
The Cinclosomatidae is a family containing jewel-babblers and quail-thrushes.

Common name	Binomial	Notes
Spotted quail-thrush	Cinclosoma punctatum	
Chestnut quail-thrush	Cinclosoma castanotum	
Copperback quail-thrush	Cinclosoma clarum	
Chestnut-breasted quail-thrush	Cinclosoma castaneothorax	
Western quail-thrush	Cinclosoma marginatum	
Cinnamon quail-thrush	Cinclosoma cinnamomeum	
Nullarbor quail-thrush	Cinclosoma alisteri	

== Cuckooshrikes ==
Order: Passeriformes Family: Campephagidae

8 species recorded [7 extant native, 1 extirpated native]
The cuckooshrikes are small to medium-sized passerine birds. They are predominantly greyish with white and black, although some species are brightly coloured.

Common name	Binomial	Notes
Ground cuckooshrike	Coracina maxima	
Barred cuckooshrike	Coracina lineata	
Black-faced cuckooshrike	Coracina novaehollandiae	
White-bellied cuckooshrike	Coracina papuensis	
Long-tailed triller	Lalage leucopyga	extirpated, Norfolk Island
White-winged triller	Lalage tricolor	
Varied triller	Lalage leucomela	
Common cicadabird	Edolisoma tenuirostre	

== Sittellas ==
Order: Passeriformes Family: Neosittidae

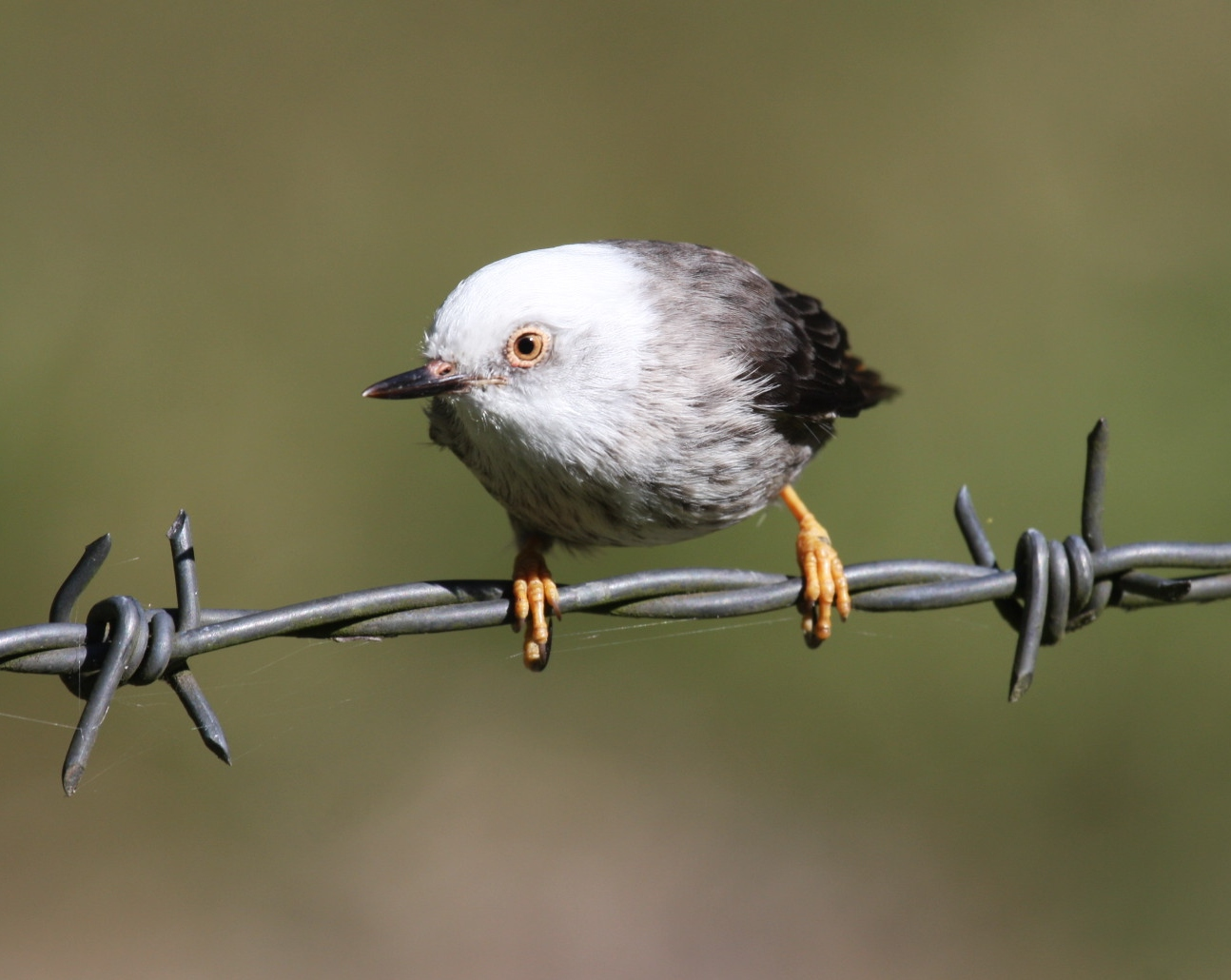
Varied sittella

1 species recorded [1 extant native]
The sittellas are a family of small passerine birds found only in Australasia. They resemble treecreepers, but have soft tails.

Common name	Binomial	Notes
Varied sittella	Daphoenositta chrysoptera	

== Whipbirds and wedgebills ==
Order: Passeriformes Family: Psophodidae

5 species recorded [5 extant native]
The Psophodidae is a family containing whipbirds and wedgebills.

Common name	Binomial	Notes
Eastern whipbird	Psophodes olivaceus	
Black-throated whipbird	Psophodes nigrogularis	
White-bellied whipbird	Psophodes leucogaster	
Chiming wedgebill	Psophodes occidentalis	
Chirruping wedgebill	Psophodes cristatus	

== Australo-Papuan bellbirds ==
Order: Passeriformes Family: Oreoicidae

1 species recorded [1 extant native]
The three species contained in the family have been moved around between different families for fifty years. A series of studies of the DNA of Australian birds between 2006 and 2001 found strong support for treating the three genera as a new family, which was formally named in 2016.

Common name	Binomial	Notes
Crested bellbird	Oreoica gutturalis	

== Shrike-tits ==
Order: Passeriformes Family: Falcunculidae

3 species recorded [3 extant native]
The shrike-tits have a parrot-like bill, used for distinctive bark-stripping behaviour, which gains it access to invertebrates.

Common name	Binomial	Notes
Eastern shrike-tit	Falcunculus frontatus	
Western shrike-tit	Falcunculus leucogaster	
Northern shrike-tit	Falcunculus whitei	

== Whistlers and allies ==
Order: Passeriformes Family: Pachycephalidae

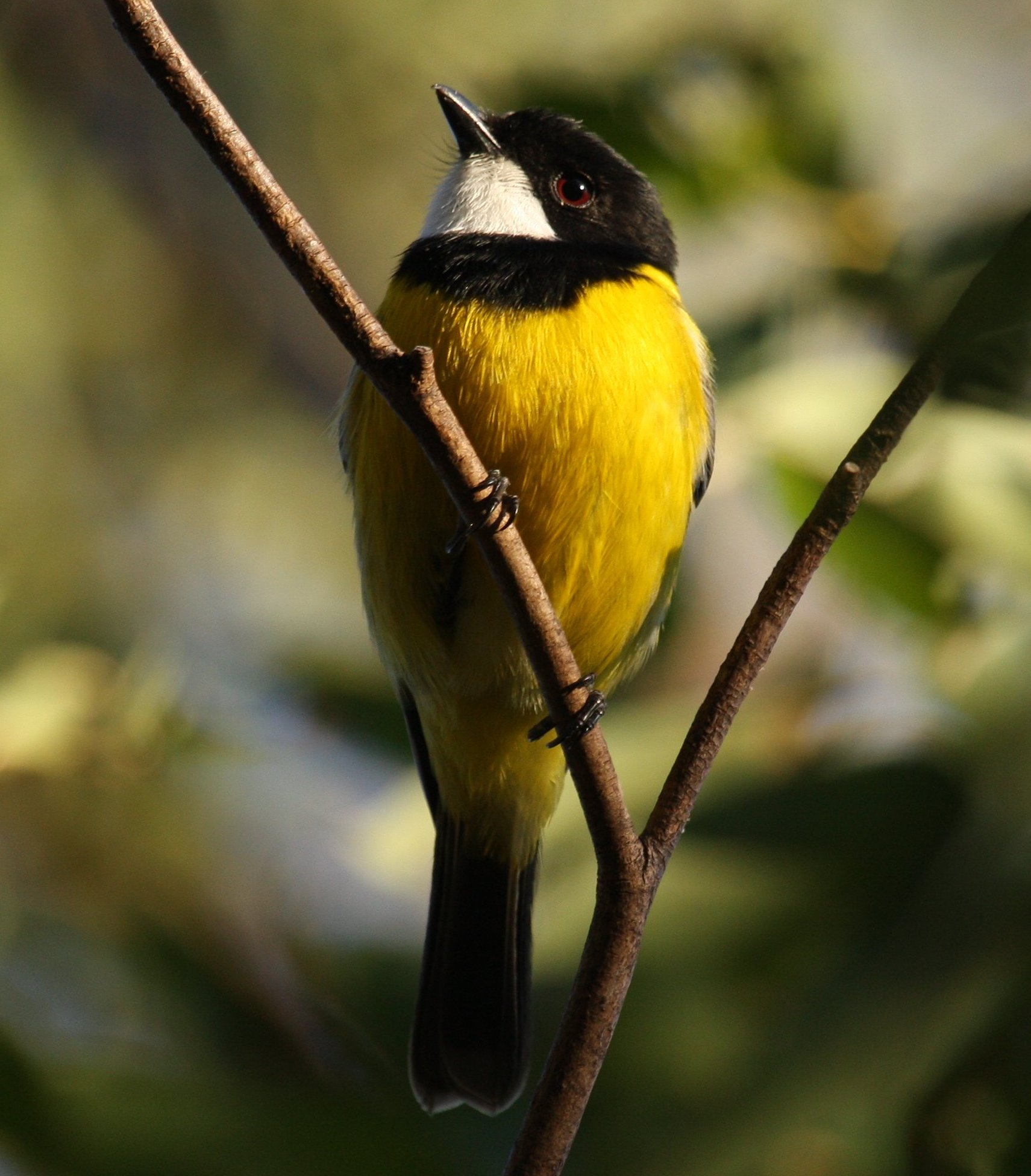
Australian golden whistler

13 species recorded [13 extant native]
The family Pachycephalidae includes the whistlers, shrikethrushes, and some of the pitohuis.

Common name	Binomial	Notes
Sandstone shrikethrush	Colluricincla woodwardi	
Bower's shrikethrush	Colluricincla boweri	
Grey shrikethrush	Colluricincla harmonica	
Little shrikethrush	Colluricincla megarhyncha	
Olive whistler	Pachycephala olivacea	
Red-lored whistler	Pachycephala rufogularis	
Gilbert's whistler	Pachycephala inornata	
Golden whistler	Pachycephala pectoralis	
Western whistler	Pachycephala fuliginosa	
Black-tailed whistler	Pachycephala melanura	
Grey whistler	Pachycephala simplex	
Rufous whistler	Pachycephala rufiventris	
White-breasted whistler	Pachycephala lanioides	

== Old World orioles ==
Order: Passeriformes Family: Oriolidae

3 species recorded [3 extant native]
The Old World orioles are colourful passerine birds. They are not related to the New World orioles.

Common name	Binomial	Notes
Olive-backed oriole	Oriolus sagittatus	
Green oriole	Oriolus flavocinctus	
Australasian figbird	Sphecotheres vieilloti	

== Boatbills ==
Order: Passeriformes Family: Machaerirhynchidae

1 species recorded [1 extant native]
The boatbills have affinities to woodswallows and butcherbirds, and are distributed across New Guinea and northern Queensland.

Common name	Binomial	Notes
Yellow-breasted boatbill	Machaerirhynchus flaviventer	

== Woodswallows, bellmagpies, and allies ==
Order: Passeriformes Family: Artamidae

15 species recorded [15 extant native]
The woodswallows are soft-plumaged, somber-coloured passerine birds. They are smooth, agile flyers with moderately large, semi-triangular wings. The cracticids: currawongs, bellmagpies and butcherbirds, are similar to the other corvids. They have large, straight bills and mostly black, white or grey plumage. All are omnivorous to some degree.

Common name	Binomial	Notes
White-breasted woodswallow	Artamus leucorynchus	
Masked woodswallow	Artamus personatus	
White-browed woodswallow	Artamus superciliosus	
Black-faced woodswallow	Artamus cinereus	
Dusky woodswallow	Artamus cyanopterus	
Little woodswallow	Artamus minor	
Black-backed butcherbird	Cracticus mentalis	
Grey butcherbird	Cracticus torquatus	
Silver-backed butcherbird	Cracticus argenteus	
Pied butcherbird	Cracticus nigrogularis	
Black butcherbird	Melloria quoyi	
Australian magpie	Gymnorhina tibicen	
Pied currawong	Strepera graculina	
Black currawong	Strepera fuliginosa	
Grey currawong	Strepera versicolor	

== Fantails ==
Order: Passeriformes Family: Rhipiduridae

7 species recorded [6 extant native, 1 extirpated]
The fantails are small insectivorous birds which are specialist aerial feeders.

Common name	Binomial	Notes
Northern fantail	Rhipidura rufiventris	
Willie-wagtail	Rhipidura leucophrys	
Rufous fantail	Rhipidura rufifrons	
Arafura fantail	Rhipidura dryas	
Grey fantail	Rhipidura albiscapa	includes the Norfolk fantail R. a. pelzeni, which may be a subspecies of R. fuliginosa
Mangrove fantail	Rhipidura phasiana	
New Zealand fantail	Rhipidura fuliginosa	extirpated, Lord Howe Island; surviving Norfolk birds may be this species

== Drongos ==
Order: Passeriformes Family: Dicruridae

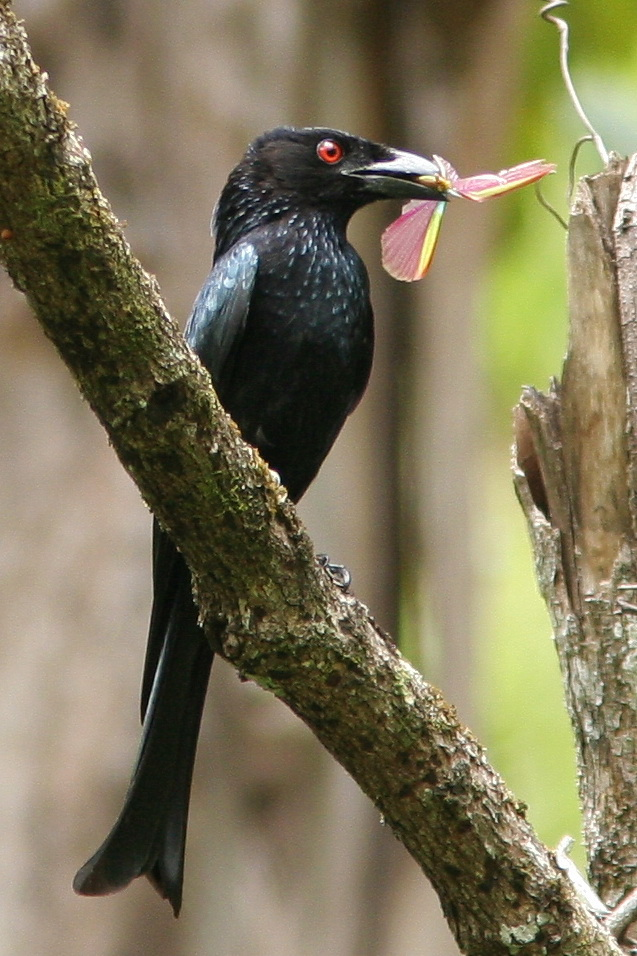
Spangled drongo

2 species recorded [1 extant native, 1 vagrant]
The drongos are mostly black or dark grey in colour, sometimes with metallic tints. They have long forked tails, and some Asian species have elaborate tail decorations. They have short legs and sit very upright when perched, like a shrike. They flycatch or take prey from the ground.

Common name	Binomial	Notes
Crow-billed drongo	Dicrurus annectens	vagrant
Spangled drongo	Dicrurus bracteatus	

== Birds-of-paradise ==
Order: Passeriformes Family: Paradisaeidae

4 species recorded [4 extant native]
The birds-of-paradise are best known for the striking plumage possessed by the males of most species, in particular highly elongated and elaborate feathers extending from the tail, wings or head. These plumes are used in courtship displays to attract females.

Common name	Binomial	Notes
Trumpet manucode	Phonygammus keraudrenii	
Paradise riflebird	Ptiloris paradiseus	
Victoria's riflebird	Ptiloris victoriae	
Magnificent riflebird	Ptiloris magnificus	

== Monarch flycatchers ==
Order: Passeriformes Family: Monarchidae

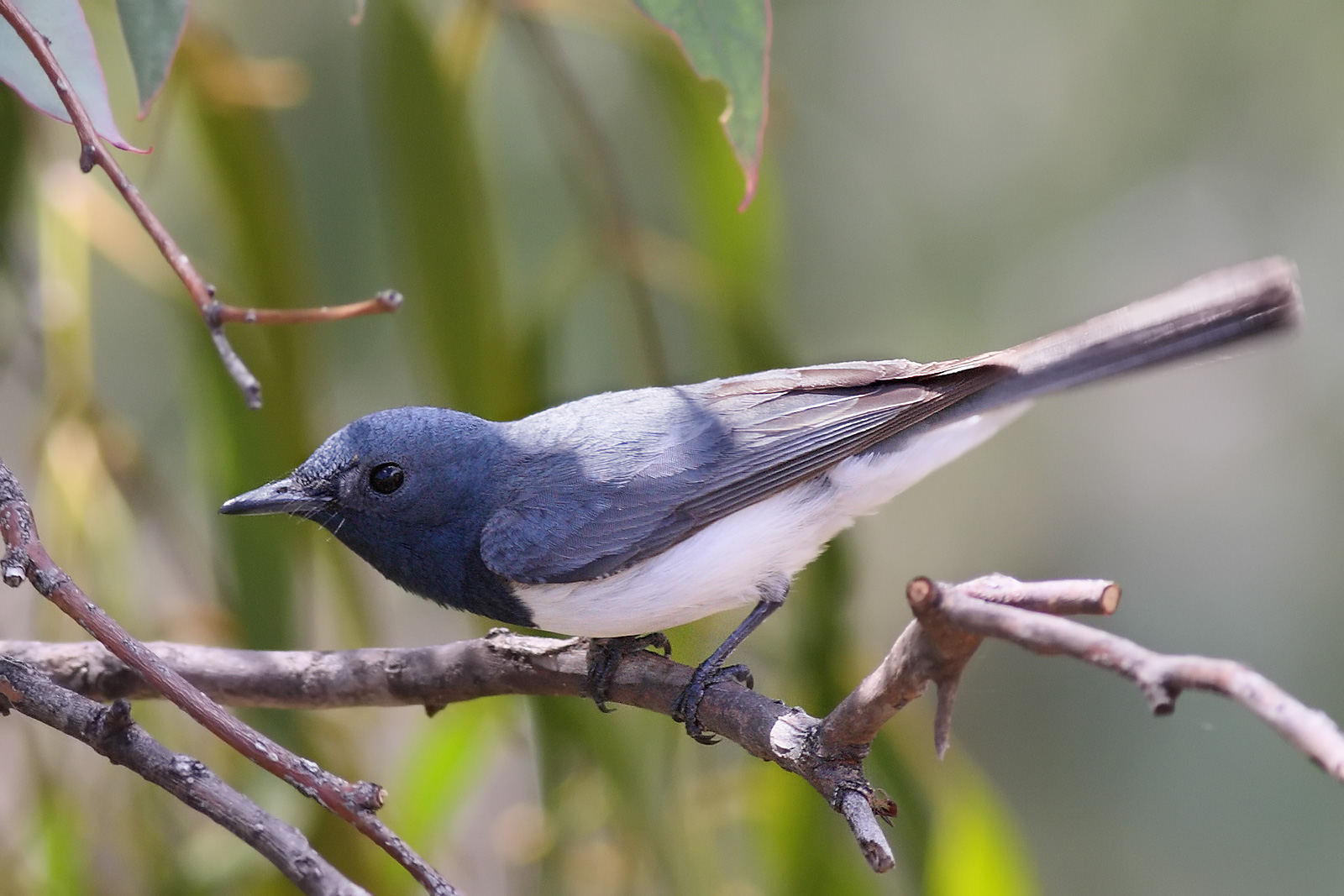
Leaden flycatcher

15 species recorded [13 extant native, 2 vagrant]
The monarch flycatchers are small to medium-sized insectivorous passerines which hunt by flycatching.

Common name	Binomial	Notes
White-eared monarch	Carterornis leucotis	
Island monarch	Monarcha cinerascens	vagrant
Black-faced monarch	Monarcha melanopsis	
Black-winged monarch	Monarcha frater	
Spectacled monarch	Symposiachrus trivirgatus	
Frilled monarch	Arses telescophthalmus	vagrant, Torres Strait
Frill-necked monarch	Arses lorealis	
Pied monarch	Arses kaupi	
Magpie-lark	Grallina cyanoleuca	
Leaden flycatcher	Myiagra rubecula	
Broad-billed flycatcher	Myiagra ruficollis	
Satin flycatcher	Myiagra cyanoleuca	
Restless flycatcher	Myiagra inquieta	
Paperbark flycatcher	Myiagra nana	
Shining flycatcher	Myiagra alecto	

== White-winged chough and apostlebird ==
Order: Passeriformes Family: Corcoracidae

2 species recorded [2 extant native]
They are found in open habitat in eastern Australia, mostly open eucalypt woodlands and some forest that lacks a closed canopy. They are highly social, spend much of their time foraging through leaf litter with a very distinctive gait, calling to one another almost constantly

Common name	Binomial	Notes
White-winged chough	Corcorax melanorhamphos	
Apostlebird	Struthidea cinerea	

== Shrikes ==
Order: Passeriformes Family: Laniidae

2 species recorded [2 vagrant]
Shrikes are passerine birds known for their habit of catching other birds and small animals and impaling the uneaten portions of their bodies on thorns. A typical shrike's beak is hooked, like a bird of prey.

Common name	Binomial	Notes
Tiger shrike	Lanius tigrinus	vagrant
Brown shrike	Lanius cristatus	vagrant, Christmas Island & Ashmore Reef

== Crows, jays, and magpies ==
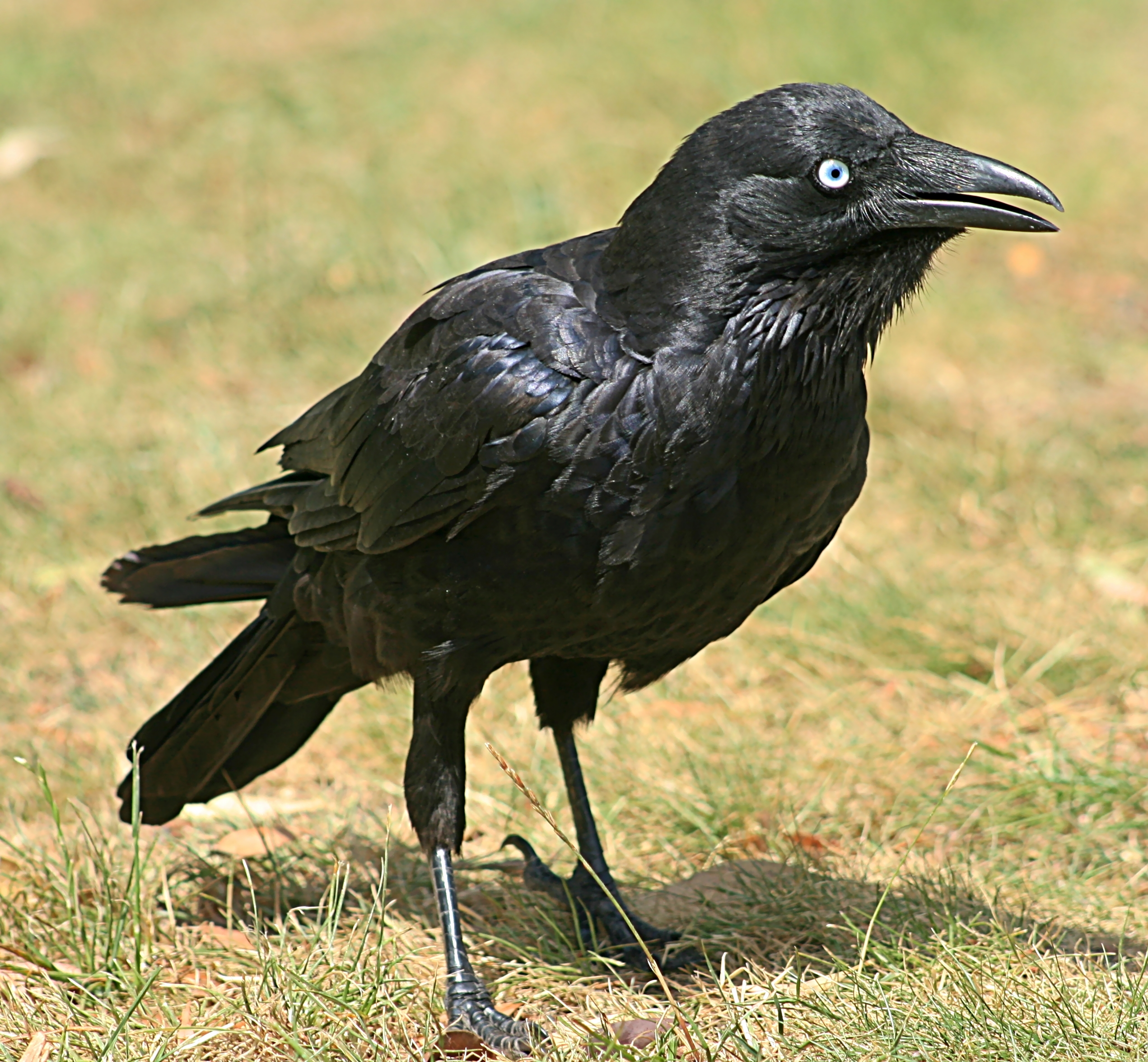
Little raven

Order: Passeriformes Family: Corvidae

6 species recorded [5 extant native, 1 vagrant]
The family Corvidae includes crows, ravens, jays, choughs, magpies, treepies, nutcrackers and ground jays. Corvids are above average in size among the Passeriformes, and some of the larger species show high levels of intelligence.

Common name	Binomial	Notes
House crow	Corvus splendens	vagrant, introduced and now extirpated
Torresian crow	Corvus orru	
Little crow	Corvus bennetti	
Australian raven	Corvus coronoides	
Little raven	Corvus mellori	
Forest raven	Corvus tasmanicus	

== Australasian robins ==
Order: Passeriformes Family: Petroicidae

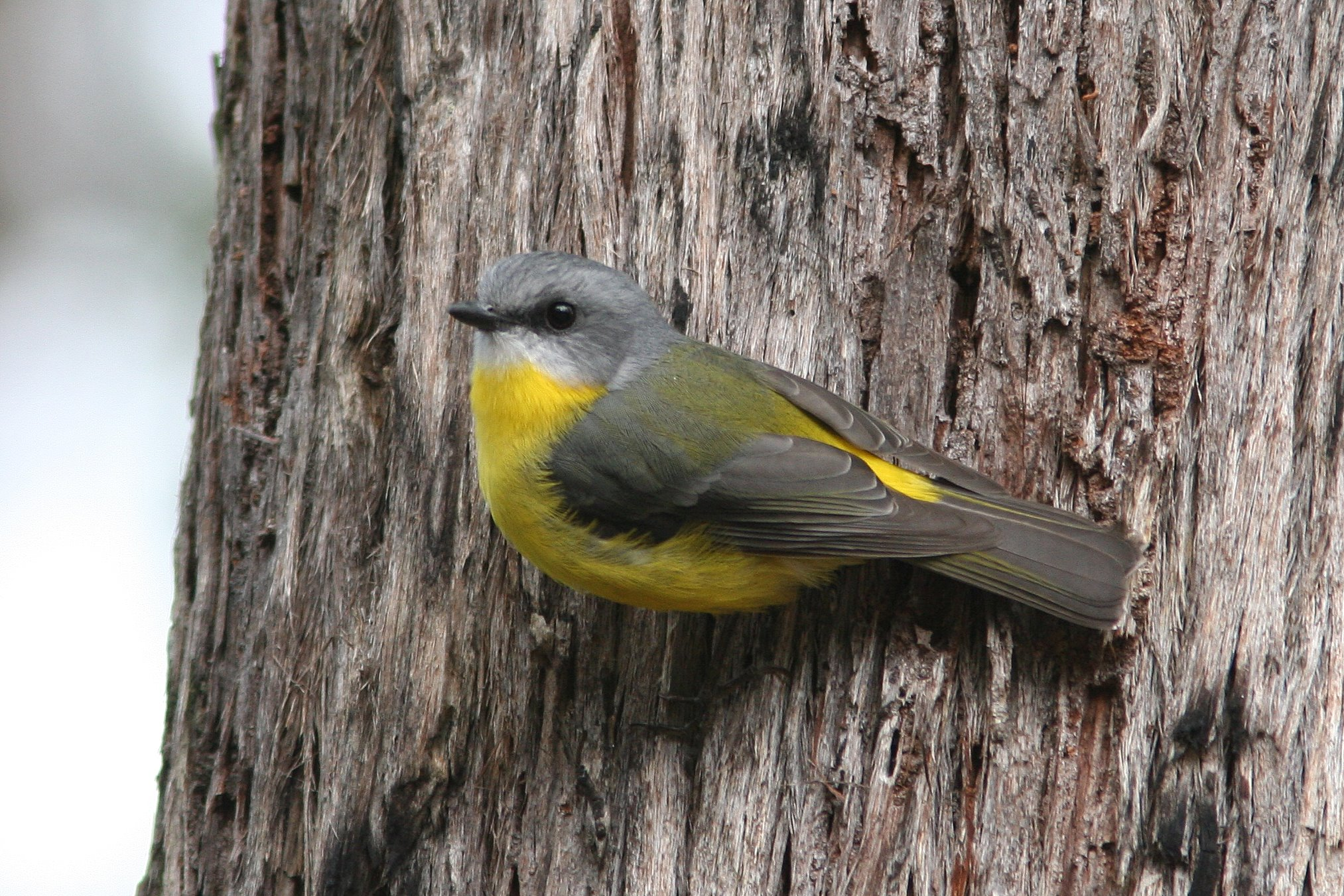
Eastern yellow robin

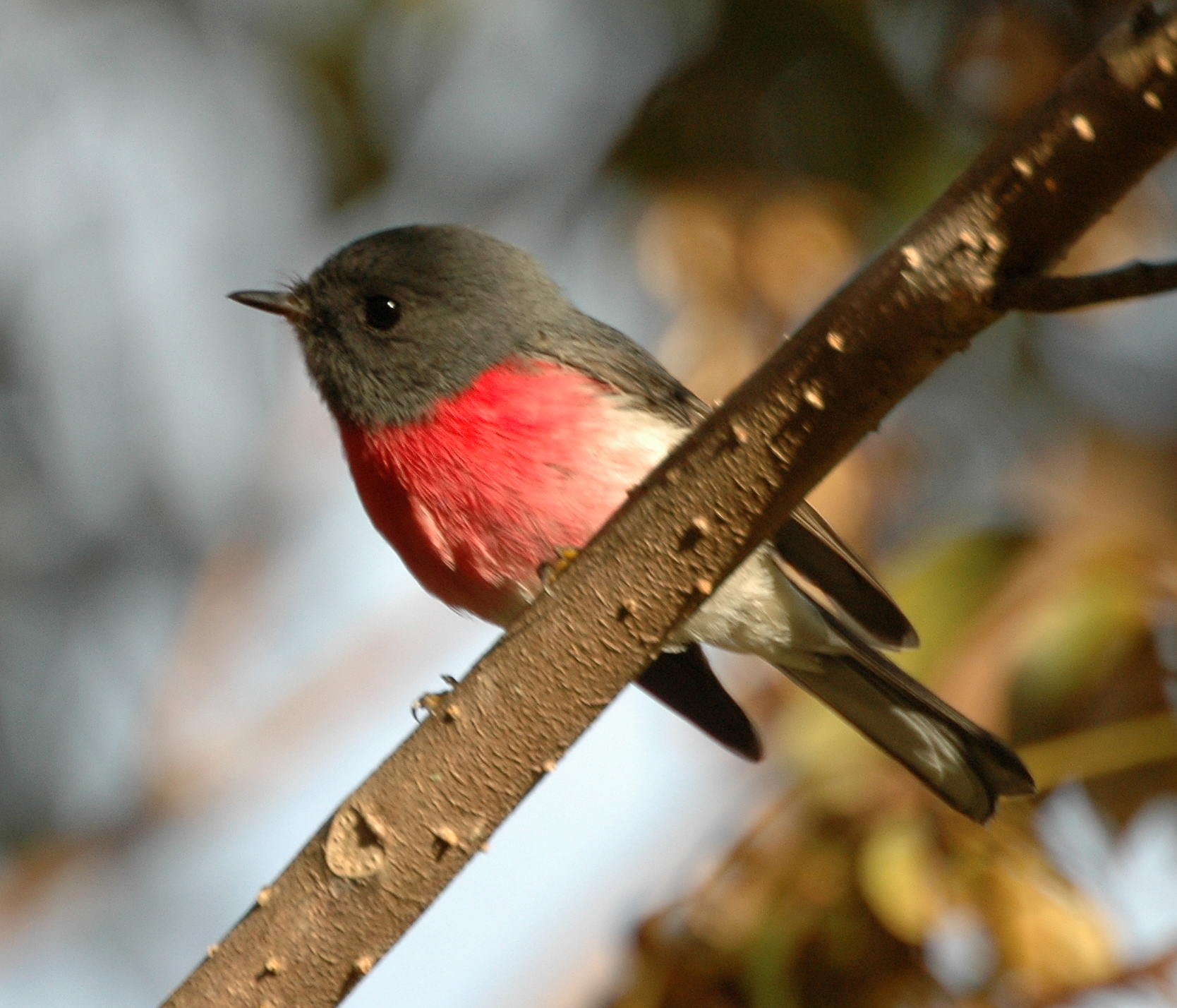
Rose robin

22 species recorded [22 extant native]
Most species of Petroicidae have a stocky build with a large rounded head, a short straight bill and rounded wingtips. They occupy a wide range of wooded habitats, from subalpine to tropical rainforest, and mangrove swamp to semi-arid scrubland. All are primarily insectivores, although a few supplement their diet with seeds.

Common name	Binomial	Notes
Jacky-winter	Microeca fascinans	
Lemon-bellied flycatcher	Microeca flavigaster	
Yellow-legged flycatcher	Microeca griseoceps	
Scarlet robin	Petroica boodang	
Flame robin	Petroica phoenicea	
Rose robin	Petroica rosea	
Pink robin	Petroica rodinogaster	
Norfolk robin	Petroica multicolor	Norfolk Island
Red-capped robin	Petroica goodenovii	
Hooded robin	Melanodryas cucullata	
Dusky robin	Melanodryas vittata	
White-faced robin	Tregellasia leucops	
Pale-yellow robin	Tregellasia capito	
Eastern yellow robin	Eopsaltria australis	
Western yellow robin	Eopsaltria griseogularis	
White-breasted robin	Eopsaltria georgiana	
Mangrove robin	Peneonanthe pulverulenta	
White-browed robin	Poecilodryas superciliosa	
Buff-sided robin	Poecilodryas cerviniventris	
Grey-headed robin	Heteromyias cinereifrons	
Northern scrub-robin	Drymodes superciliaris	
Southern scrub-robin	Drymodes brunneopygia	

== Larks ==
Order: Passeriformes Family: Alaudidae

2 species recorded [1 extant native, 1 introduced]
Larks are small terrestrial birds with often extravagant songs and display flights. Most larks are fairly dull in appearance. Their food is insects and seeds.

Common name	Binomial	Notes
Horsfield's bushlark	Mirafra javanica	
Eurasian skylark	Alauda arvensis	introduced

== Cisticolas and allies ==
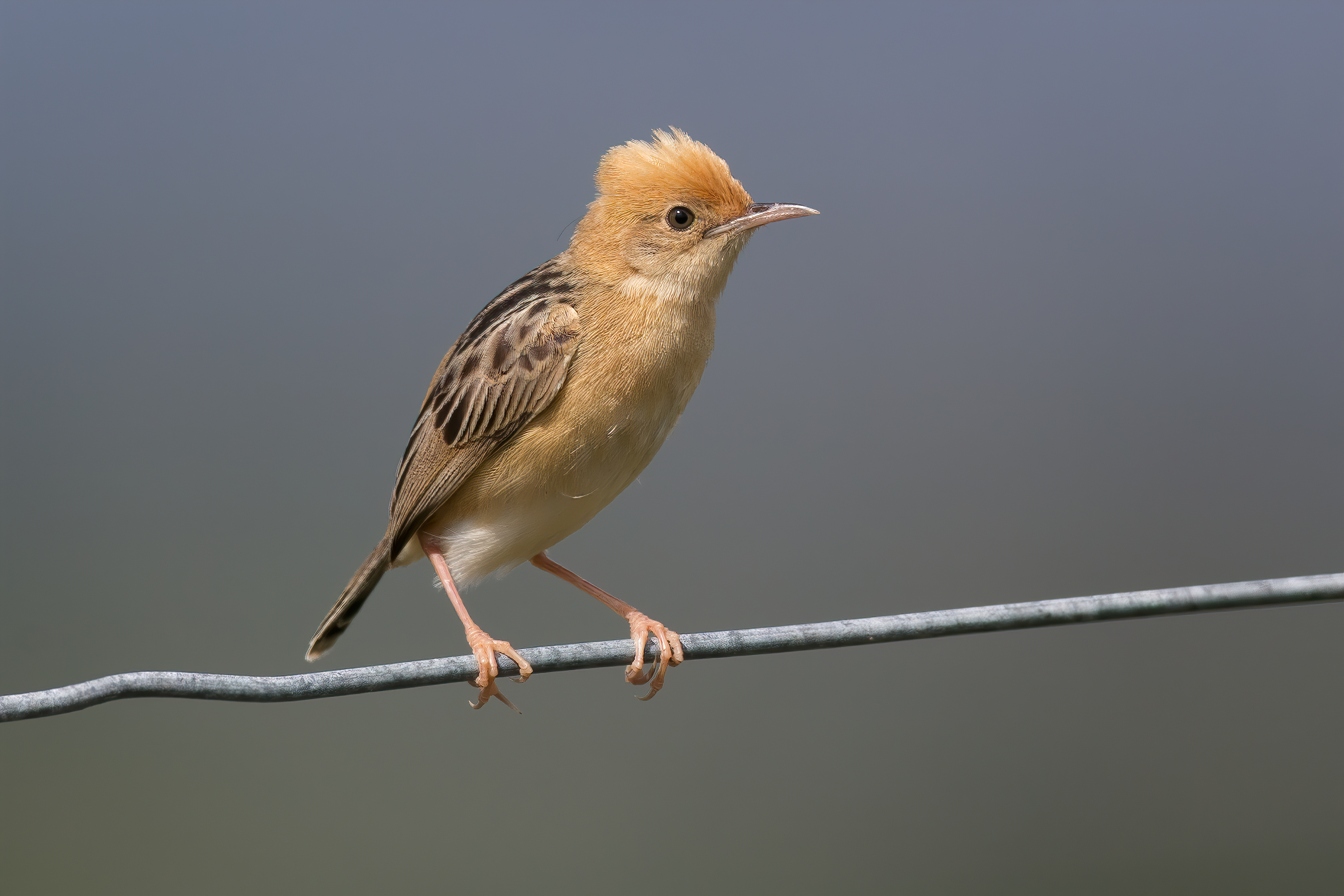
Golden-headed cisticola

Order: Passeriformes Family: Cisticolidae

2 species recorded [2 extant native]
The Cisticolidae are warblers found mainly in warmer southern regions of the Old World. They are generally very small birds of drab brown or grey appearance found in open country such as grassland or scrub.

Common name	Binomial	Notes
Zitting cisticola	Cisticola juncidis	
Golden-headed cisticola	Cisticola exilis	

== Reed warblers and allies ==
Order: Passeriformes Family: Acrocephalidae

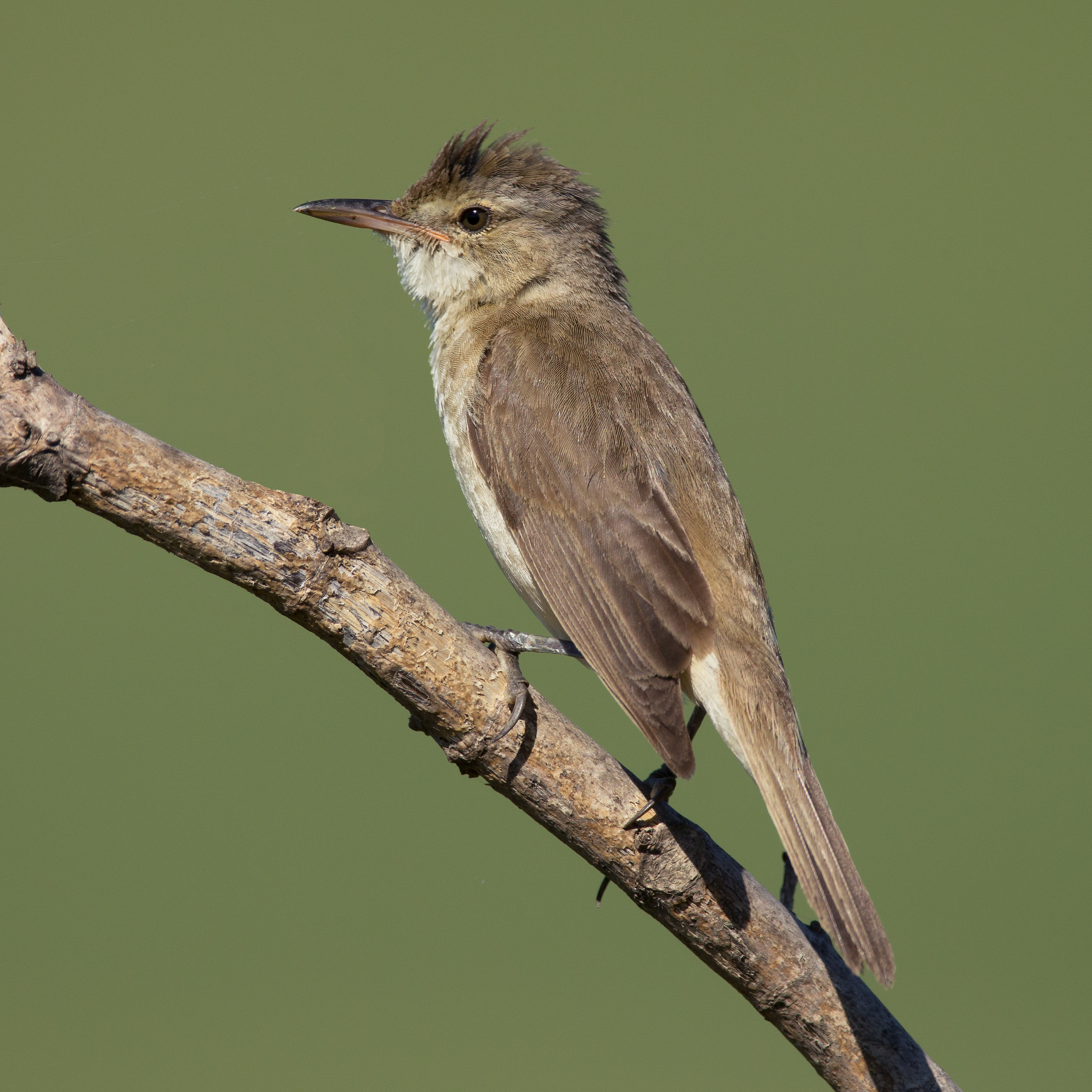
Australian reed warbler

2 species recorded [1 extant native, 1 vagrant]
The members of this family are usually rather large for "warblers". Most are rather plain olivaceous brown above with much yellow to beige below. They are usually found in open woodland, reedbeds, or tall grass. The family occurs mostly in southern to western Eurasia and surroundings, but it also ranges far into the Pacific, with some species in Africa.

Common name	Binomial	Notes
Oriental reed warbler	Acrocephalus orientalis	vagrant
Australian reed warbler	Acrocephalus australis	

== Grassbirds and allies ==
Order: Passeriformes Family: Locustellidae

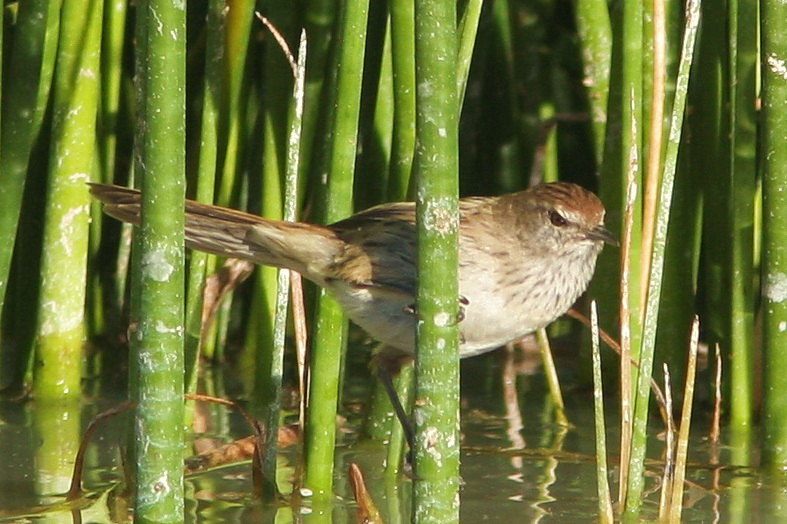
Little grassbird

8 species recorded [5 extant native, 3 vagrant]
Locustellidae are a family of small insectivorous songbirds found mainly in Eurasia, Africa, and the Australian region. They are smallish birds with tails that are usually long and pointed, and tend to be drab brownish or buffy all over.

Common name	Binomial	Notes
Spinifexbird	Poodytes carteri	
Little grassbird	Poodytes gramineus	
Brown songlark	Cincloramphus cruralis	
Rufous songlark	Cincloramphus mathewsi	
Tawny grassbird	Cincloramphus timoriensis	
Gray's grasshopper warbler	Helopsaltes fasciolatus	vagrant, Ashmore Reef & possibly mainland
Pallas's grasshopper warbler	Helopsaltes certhiola	vagrant, Christmas Island & Ashmore Reef
Middendorff's grasshopper warbler	Helopsaltes ochotensis	vagrant

== Swallows ==
Order: Passeriformes Family: Hirundinidae

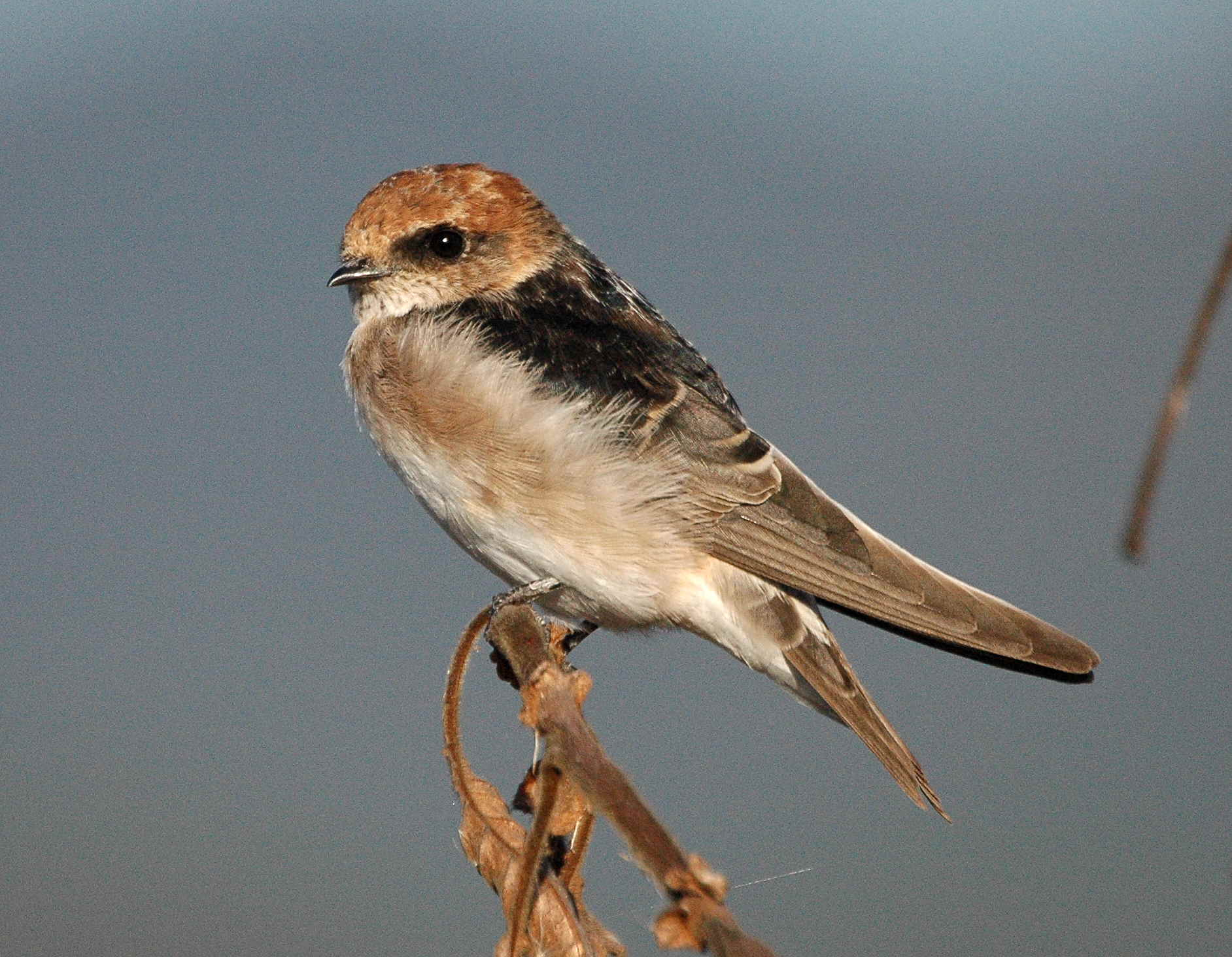
Fairy martin

7 species recorded [6 extant native, 1 vagrant]
The family Hirundinidae is adapted to aerial feeding. They have a slender streamlined body, long pointed wings, and a short bill with a wide gape. The feet are adapted to perching rather than walking, and the front toes are partially joined at the base.

Common name	Binomial	Notes
Barn swallow	Hirundo rustica	
Welcome swallow	Hirundo neoxena	
Red-rumped swallow	Cecropis daurica	
Fairy martin	Petrochelidon ariel	
Tree martin	Petrochelidon nigricans	
Asian house-martin	Delichon dasypus	vagrant, Christmas & Cocos (Keeling) Islands
White-backed swallow	Cheramoeca leucosternus	

== Bulbuls ==
Order: Passeriformes Family: Pycnonotidae

2 species recorded [1 introduced, 1 extirpated]
Bulbuls are medium-sized songbirds. Some are colourful with yellow, red or orange vents, cheeks, throats or supercilia, but most are drab, with uniform olive-brown to black plumage. Some species have distinct crests.

Common name	Binomial	Notes
Red-vented bulbul	Pycnonotus cafer	extirpated
Red-whiskered bulbul	Pycnonotus jocosus	introduced

== Leaf warblers ==
Order: Passeriformes Family: Phylloscopidae

6 species recorded [6 vagrant]
Leaf warblers are a family of small insectivorous birds found mostly in Eurasia and ranging into Wallacea and Africa. The species are of various sizes, often green-plumaged above and yellow below, or more subdued with greyish-green to greyish-brown colours.

Common name	Binomial	Notes
Yellow-browed warbler	Phylloscopus inornatus	vagrant, Ashmore Reef
Dusky warbler	Phylloscopus fuscatus	vagrant, Christmas Island
Willow warbler	Phylloscopus trochilus	vagrant, Ashmore Reef
Eastern crowned warbler	Phylloscopus coronatus	vagrant, Ashmore Reef
Arctic warbler	Phylloscopus borealis	vagrant
Kamchatka leaf warbler	Phylloscopus examinandus	vagrant, Ashmore Reef

== Bush warblers and allies ==
Order: Passeriformes Family: Scotocercidae

1 species recorded [1 vagrant]
The members of this family are found throughout Africa, Asia, and Polynesia. Their taxonomy is in flux, and some authorities place some genera in other families.

Common name	Binomial	Notes
Asian stubtail	Urosphena squameiceps	vagrant, Ashmore Reef

== White-eyes, yuhinas, and allies ==
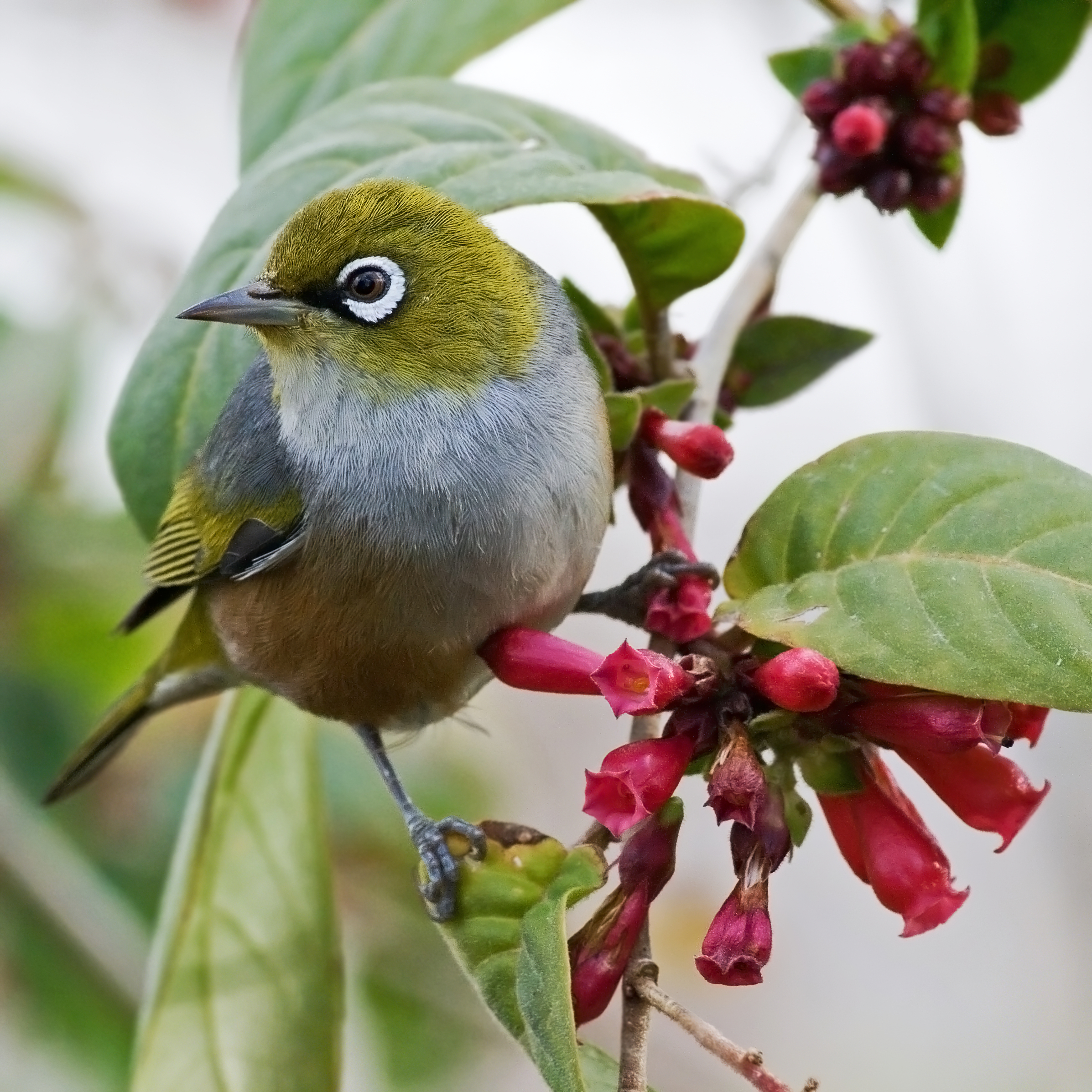
Silvereye

Order: Passeriformes Family: Zosteropidae

8 species recorded [6 extant native, 1 possibly extinct native, 1 extinct native]
The white-eyes are small birds of rather drab appearance, the plumage above being typically greenish-olive, but some species have a white or bright yellow throat, breast, or lower parts, and several have buff flanks. As the name suggests, many species have a white ring around each eye.

Common name	Binomial	Notes
Christmas Island white-eye	Zosterops natalis	Christmas Island
Ashy-bellied white-eye	Zosterops citrinella	
Australian yellow white-eye	Zosterops luteus	
Slender-billed white-eye	Zosterops tenuirostris	Norfolk Island
Robust white-eye	Zosterops strenuus	extinct, Lord Howe Island
White-chested white-eye	Zosterops albogularis	possibly extinct, Norfolk Island
Silvereye	Zosterops lateralis	

== Starlings ==
Order: Passeriformes Family: Sturnidae

8 species recorded [2 extant native, 2 introduced, 3 vagrant, 1 extinct native]
Starlings are small to medium-sized passerine birds. Their flight is strong and direct and they are very gregarious. Their preferred habitat is fairly open country. They eat insects and fruit. Plumage is typically dark with a metallic sheen.

Common name	Binomial	Notes
Metallic starling	Aplonis metallica	
Singing starling	Aplonis cantoroides	Torres Strait
Norfolk starling	Aplonis fusca	extinct, Lord Howe & Norfolk Island
European starling	Sturnus vulgaris	introduced
Rosy starling	Pastor roseus	vagrant
Daurian starling	Agropsar sturninus	vagrant, Christmas & Cocos (Keeling) Islands
Chestnut-cheeked starling	Agropsar philippensis	vagrant, Ashmore Reef
Common myna	Acridotheres tristis	introduced

== Thrushes and allies ==
Order: Passeriformes Family: Turdidae

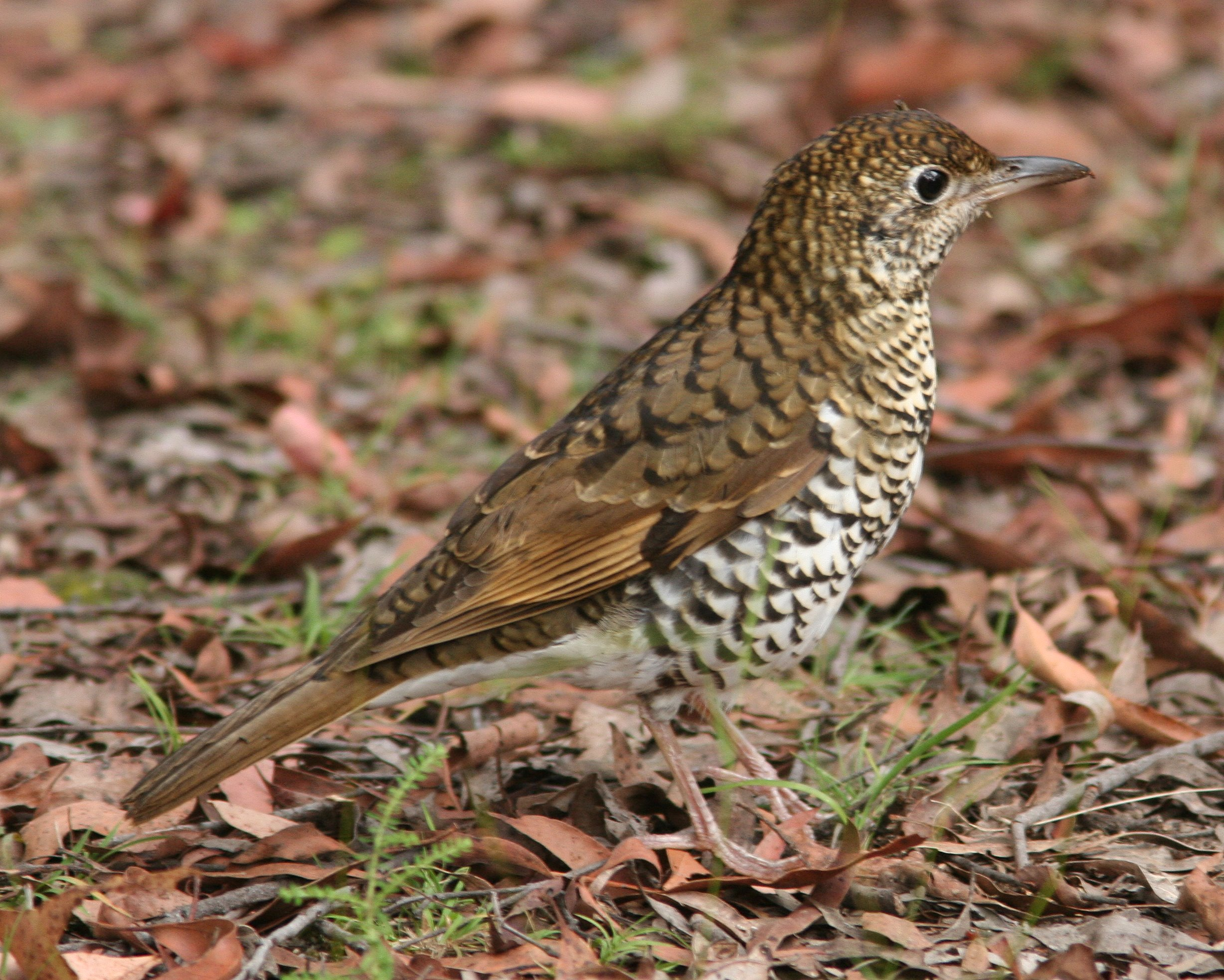
Bassian thrush

7 species recorded [3 extant native, 2 introduced, 2 vagrant, 1 extinct native]
The thrushes are a group of passerine birds that occur mainly in the Old World. They are plump, soft plumaged, small to medium-sized insectivores or sometimes omnivores, often feeding on the ground. Many have attractive songs.

Common name	Binomial	Notes
Bassian thrush	Zoothera lunulata	
Russet-tailed thrush	Zoothera heinei	
Siberian thrush	Geokichla sibirica	vagrant, Ashmore Reef
Song thrush	Turdus philomelos	introduced
Eurasian blackbird	Turdus merula	introduced
Eye-browed thrush	Turdus obscurus	vagrant
Tasman Sea island thrush	Turdus poliocephalus	extinct, Norfolk Island, Lord Howe Island
Christmas island thrush	Turdus erythropleurus	Christmas Island

== Old World flycatchers ==
Order: Passeriformes Family: Muscicapidae

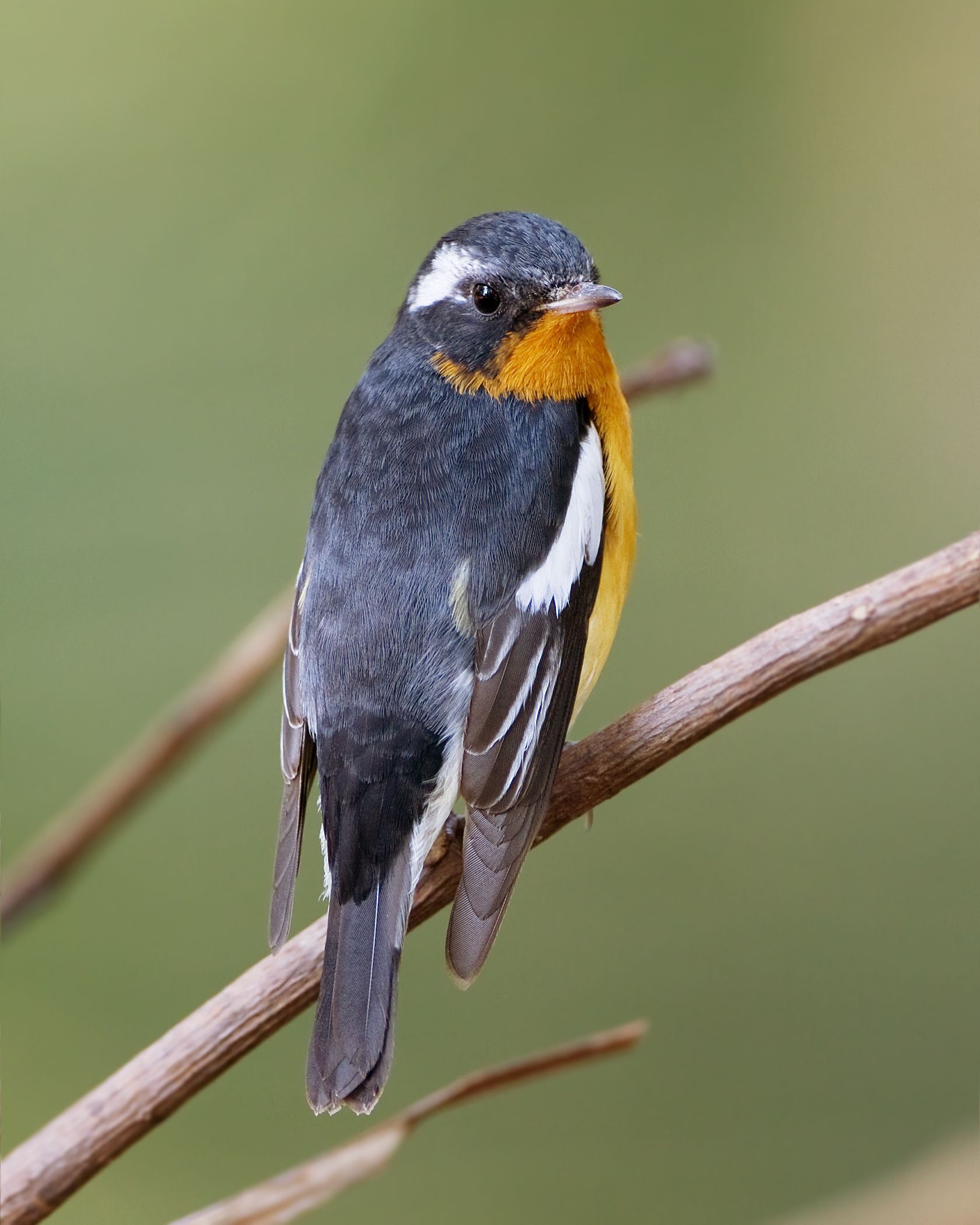
Mugimaki flycatcher

12 species recorded [12 vagrant]
Old World flycatchers are a large group of small arboreal insectivores. The appearance of these birds is highly varied, but they mostly have weak songs and harsh calls.

Common name	Binomial	Notes
Grey-streaked flycatcher	Muscicapa griseisticta	vagrant, Ashmore Reef & Cocos (Keeling) Islands
Dark-sided flycatcher	Muscicapa sibirica	vagrant
Asian brown flycatcher	Muscicapa dauurica	vagrant, Ashmore Reef, Browse & Cocos (Keeling) Islands
Blue-and-white flycatcher	Cyanoptila cyanomelana	vagrant
Siberian blue robin	Larvivora cyane	vagrant, Ashmore Reef
Siberian rubythroat	Calliope calliope	vagrant
Narcissus flycatcher	Ficedula narcissina	vagrant, Ashmore Reef, Barrow Island, WA & Cocos (Keeling) Islands
Mugimaki flycatcher	Ficedula mugimaki	vagrant, Cocos (Keeling) Islands
Blue rock-thrush	Monticola solitarius	vagrant
Amur stonechat	Saxicola stejnegeri	vagrant
Northern wheatear	Oenanthe oenanthe	vagrant, Cocos (Keeling) Islands
Isabelline wheatear	Oenanthe isabellina	vagrant

== Flowerpeckers ==
Order: Passeriformes Family: Dicaeidae

2 species recorded [2 extant native]
The flowerpeckers are very small, stout, often brightly coloured birds, with short tails, short thick curved bills, and tubular tongues.

Common name	Binomial	Notes
Red-capped flowerpecker	Dicaeum geelvinkianum	Torres Strait
Mistletoebird	Dicaeum hirundinaceum	

== Sunbirds and spiderhunters ==
Order: Passeriformes Family: Nectariniidae

1 species recorded [1 extant native]
The sunbirds and spiderhunters are very small passerine birds which feed largely on nectar, although they will also take insects, especially when feeding young. Their flight is fast and direct on short wings. Most species can take nectar by hovering like a hummingbird, but usually perch to feed.

Common name	Binomial	Notes
Sahul sunbird	Cinnyris frenatus	

== Waxbills and allies ==
Order: Passeriformes Family: Estrildidae

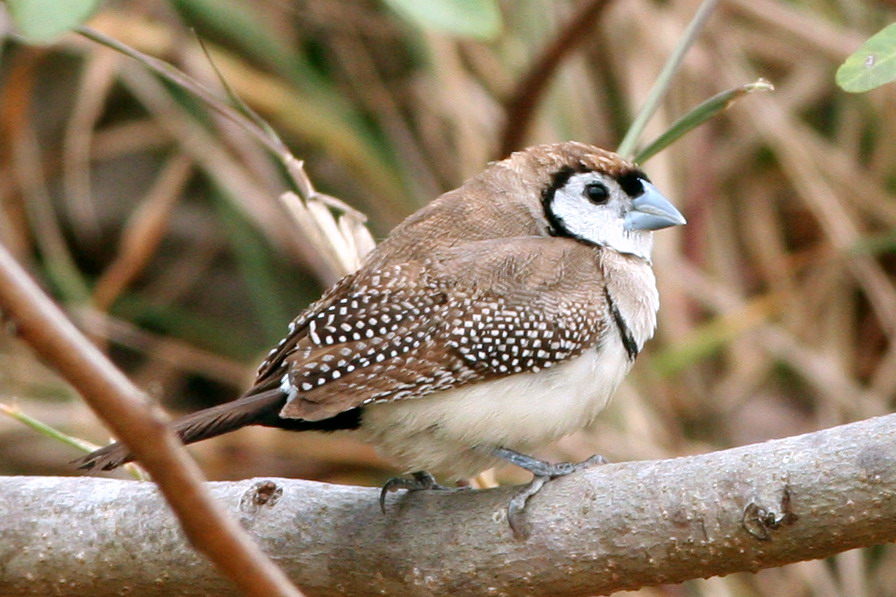
Double-barred finch

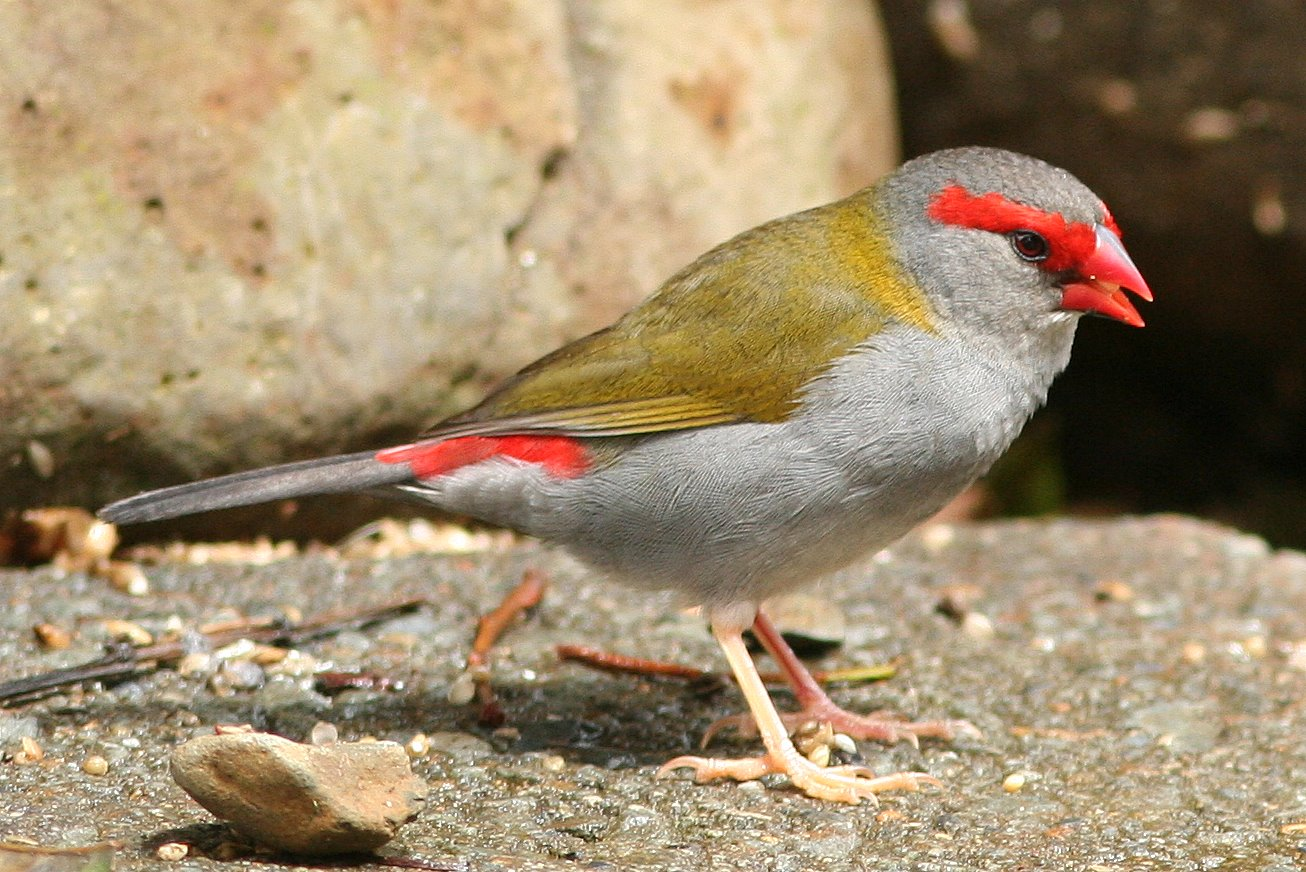
Red-browed finch

22 species recorded [18 extant native, 3 introduced, 1 vagrant]
The estrildid finches are small passerine birds of the Old World tropics and Australasia. They are gregarious and often colonial seed eaters with short thick but pointed bills. They are all similar in structure and habits, but have wide variation in plumage colours and patterns.

Common name	Binomial	Notes
Painted firetail	Emblema pictum	
Beautiful firetail	Stagonopleura bella	
Red-eared firetail	Stagonopleura oculata	
Diamond firetail	Stagonopleura guttata	
Red-browed finch	Neochmia temporalis	
Crimson finch	Neochmia phaeton	
Star finch	Bathilda ruficauda	
Plum-headed finch	Aidemosyne modesta	
Zebra finch	Taeniopygia guttata	
Double-barred finch	Stizoptera bichenovii	
Masked finch	Poephila personata	
Long-tailed finch	Poephila acuticauda	
Black-throated finch	Poephila cincta	
Blue-faced parrotfinch	Erythrura trichroa	
Gouldian finch	Chloebia gouldiae	
Scaly-breasted munia	Lonchura punctulata	introduced, mainland; vagrant, Ashmore Reef
Chestnut munia	Lonchura atricapilla	introduced
Pale-headed munia	Lonchura pallida	vagrant, Ashmore Reef
Yellow-rumped munia	Lonchura flaviprymna	
Chestnut-breasted munia	Lonchura castaneothorax	
Java sparrow	Padda oryzivora	introduced, Christmas Island
Pictorella munia	Heteromunia pectoralis	

== Old World sparrows ==
Order: Passeriformes Family: Passeridae

2 species recorded [2 introduced]
Old World sparrows are small passerine birds, typically small, plump, brown or grey with short tails and short powerful beaks. They are seed-eaters, but also consume small insects.

Common name	Binomial	Notes
House sparrow	Passer domesticus	introduced
Eurasian tree sparrow	Passer montanus	introduced

== Wagtails and pipits ==
Order: Passeriformes Family: Motacillidae

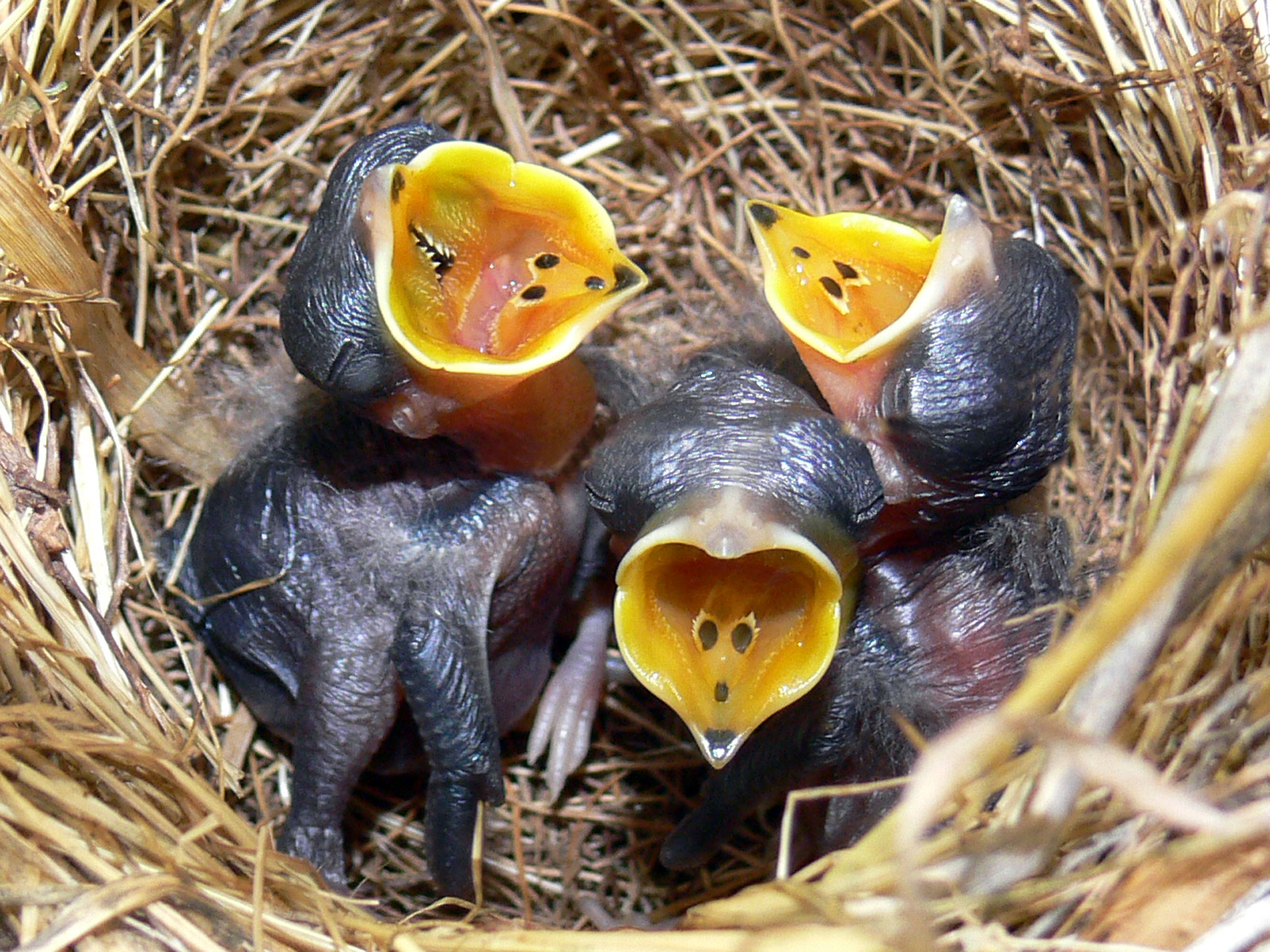
Australian pipit chicks

11 species recorded [3 extant native, 8 vagrant]
Motacillidae is a family of small passerine birds with medium to long tails and comprises the wagtails, longclaws, and pipits. These are slender ground-feeding insectivores of open country.

Common name	Binomial	Notes
Forest wagtail	Dendronanthus indicus	vagrant
Grey wagtail	Motacilla cinerea	vagrant
Western yellow wagtail	Motacilla flava	
Eastern yellow wagtail	Motacilla tschutschensis	
Citrine wagtail	Motacilla citreola	vagrant
White wagtail	Motacilla alba	vagrant
Australian pipit	Anthus australis	
Tree pipit	Anthus trivialis	vagrant
New Zealand pipit	Anthus novaeseelandiae	vagrant
Pechora pipit	Anthus gustavi	vagrant, Ashmore Reef & Browse Island
Red-throated pipit	Anthus cervinus	vagrant

== Finches, euphonias, and allies ==
Order: Passeriformes Family: Fringillidae

5 species recorded [4 introduced, 1 introduced vagrant]
Finches are small to moderately large seed-eating passerine birds with a strong beak, usually conical and in some species very large. All have 12 tail feathers and nine primary flight feathers. Finches have a bouncing flight, alternating bouts of flapping with gliding on closed wings, and most sing well.

Common name	Binomial	Notes
Common chaffinch	Fringilla coelebs	vagrant from introduced NZ population, Macquarie, Lord Howe & Norfolk Island
European greenfinch	Chloris chloris	introduced
Common redpoll	Acanthis flammea	introduced, Macquarie Island & vagrant, Lord Howe Island; in both cases, from introduced NZ population
Lesser redpoll	Acanthis cabaret	introduced
European goldfinch	Carduelis carduelis	introduced

== Old World buntings ==
Order: Passeriformes Family: Emberizidae

2 species recorded [1 introduced vagrant, 1 vagrant]
The emberizids are a large family of seed-eating birds with distinctively shaped bills. Many emberizid species have distinctive head patterns.

Common name	Binomial	Notes
Yellowhammer	Emberiza citrinella	vagrant from introduced NZ population, Lord Howe Island & possibly Macquarie Island
Yellow-breasted bunting	Emberiza aureola	vagrant

== See also ==
- Birds of Australia, including links to state and local lists
- List of birds of Australia, New Zealand and Antarctica
- Lists of birds by region
  - List of birds of Western Australia
  - List of birds of South Australia
  - List of birds of Queensland
  - List of birds of New South Wales
  - List of birds of Victoria
  - List of birds of Tasmania
  - List of birds of the Northern Territory
  - List of birds of the Cocos (Keeling) Islands
  - List of birds of Christmas Island
  - List of birds of Ashmore Reef
  - List of birds of the Coral Sea Islands
  - List of birds of Lord Howe Island
  - List of birds of Norfolk Island
  - List of birds of Macquarie Island
  - List of birds of Heard and McDonald Islands
- Fauna of Australia
- List of endemic birds of Australia
