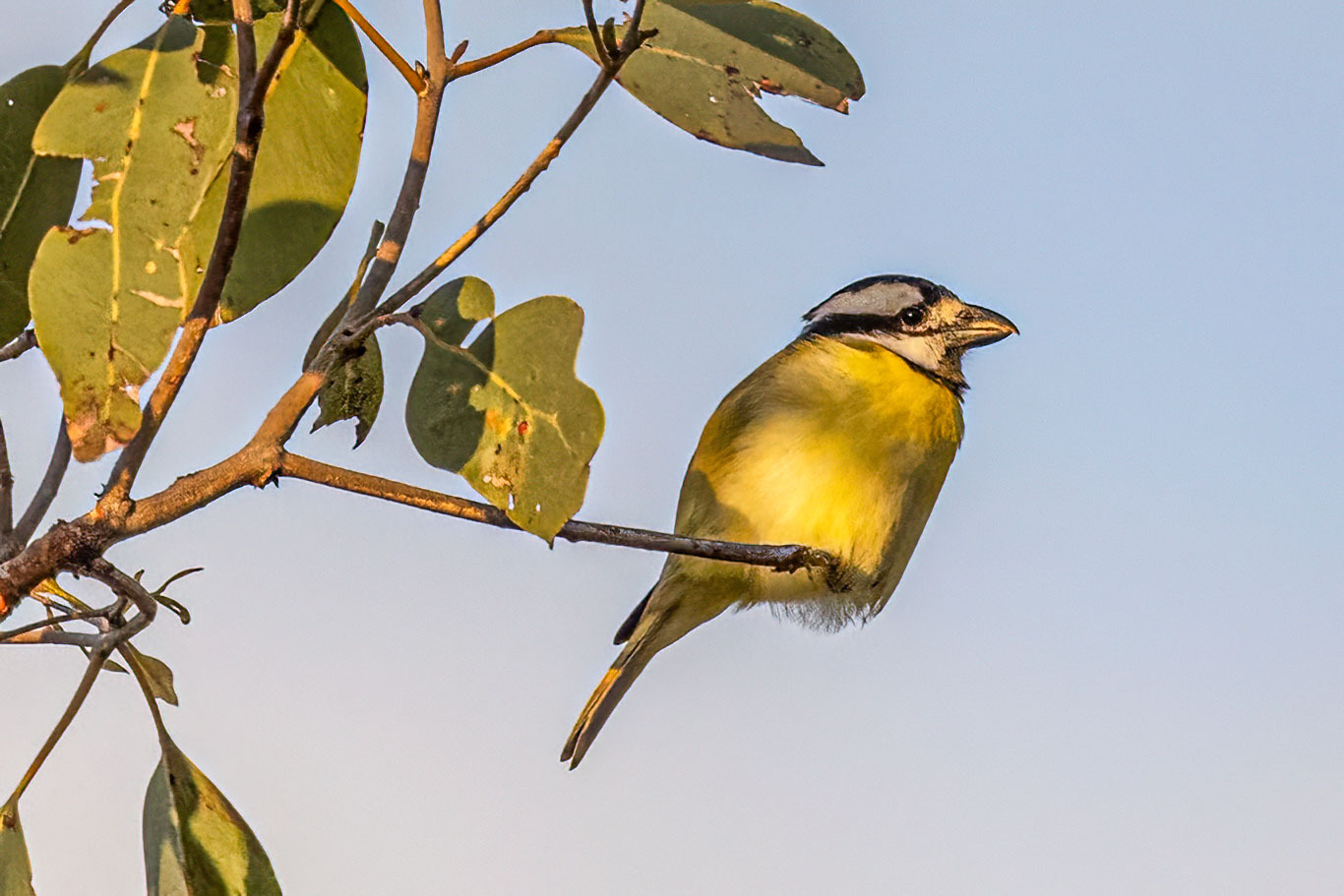
- In Wyndham–East Kimberley, Western Australia

Conservation status
- Least Concern (IUCN 3.1)

Scientific classification
- Kingdom: Animalia
- Phylum: Chordata
- Class: Aves
- Order: Passeriformes
- Family: Falcunculidae
- Genus: Falcunculus
- Species: F. whitei

Binomial name
- Falcunculus whitei Campbell, AJ, 1910

= Northern shriketit =

Species of bird

The northern shriketit (Falcunculus whitei) is a species of bird in the family Falcunculidae. It is found in the Kimberley region of north-western Australia and the Top End of the Northern Territory.

This bird is sometimes considered to be a subspecies of the eastern shriketit (F. frontatus), often lumped with it and the western shriketit (F. leucogaster).
