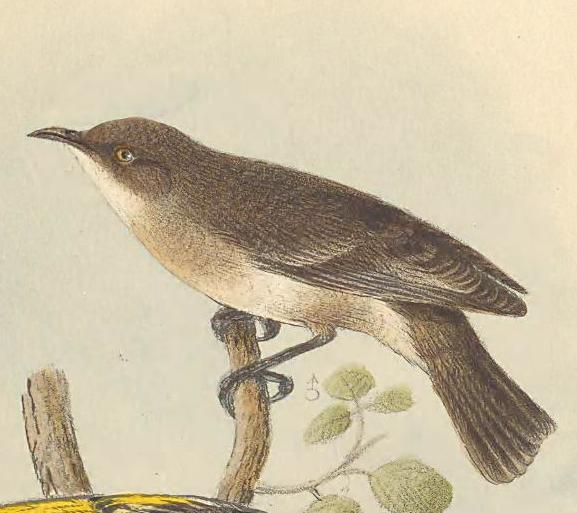
- Illustration by Henrik Grönvold
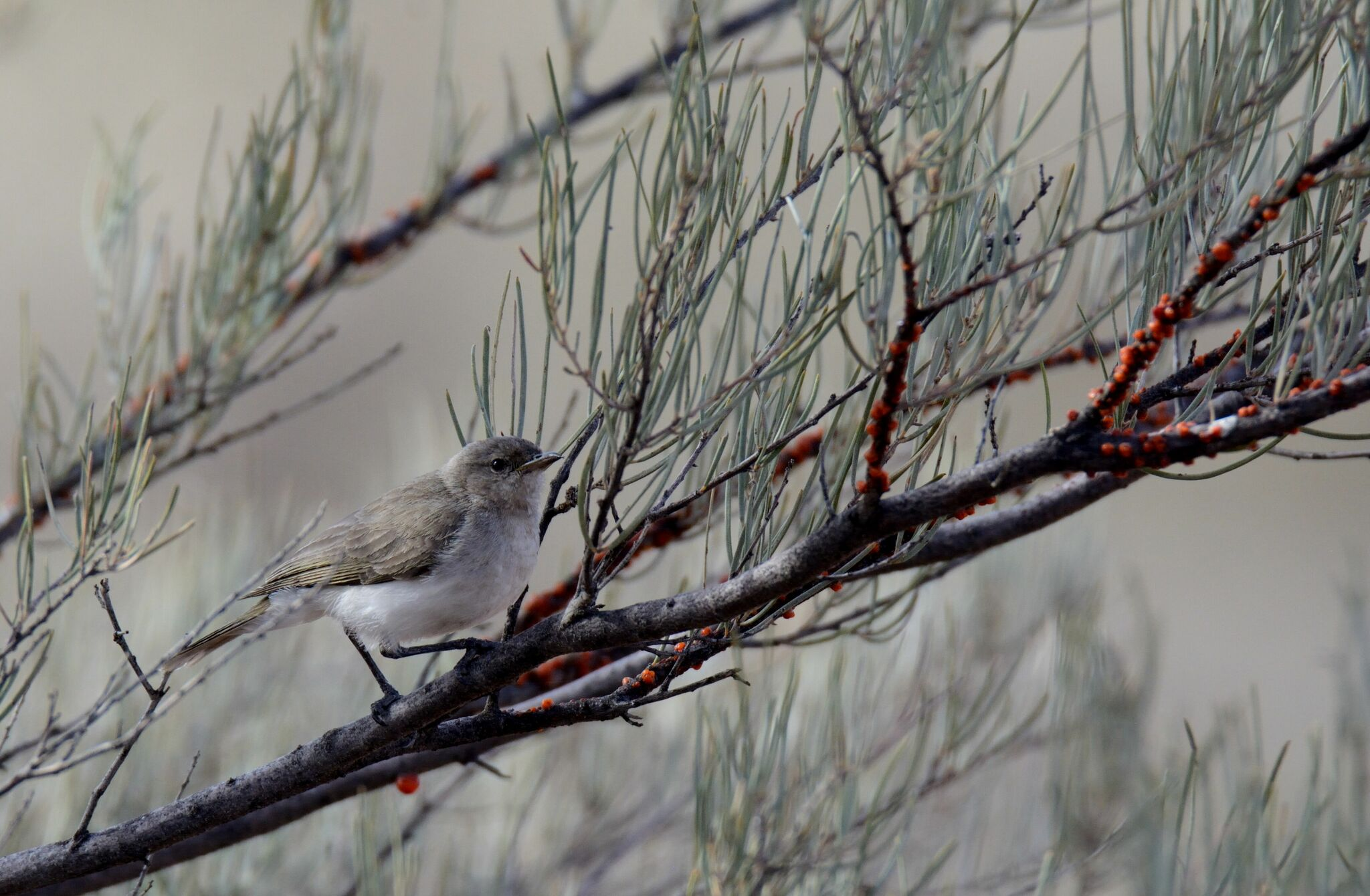

Conservation status
- Least Concern (IUCN 3.1)

Scientific classification
- Kingdom: Animalia
- Phylum: Chordata
- Class: Aves
- Order: Passeriformes
- Family: Meliphagidae
- Genus: Conopophila
- Species: C. whitei

Binomial name
- Conopophila whitei (North, 1910)

Synonyms
- Lacustroica whitei North.

= Grey honeyeater =

Species of bird

The grey honeyeater (Conopophila whitei) is a species of bird in the honeyeater family. It is an uncommon and little-known bird, an often overlooked endemic of remote areas in central Australia.

== Taxonomy ==
Currently placed as a species of the genus Conopophila and classified within the honeyeater family Meliphagidae, Conopophila whitei was first described by A. J. North in 1910 as Lacustroica whitei. The population continued to be assigned to a monotypic genus Lacustroica, or as most closely related to two other species, the rufous-banded (Conopophila rufogularis) and rufous-throated (C. albogularis) honeyeaters.

The species was found by F. Lawson Whitlock in 1903 at Lake Austin in Western Australia, but no formal description was made. The two specimens he shot and prepared were sent to the Western Australian Museum, about which he received no reply. At the beginning of his later expedition, in 1909, Whitlock killed and skinned a male of the species, recognised as the same he collected in 1903, and located the preparation of a nest by a breeding pair close to the town-site of Wiluna. Whitlock also noted the location of other nesting sites on his journeys around Wiluna, all of which he found had been removed when he returned to them. He continued to observe the progress of the nest near the main street, that had remained undisrupted, eventually removing the branch that held it for his collection. These specimens were supplied to North for the first accepted description, published the following year.

The specific epithet whitei honours Alfred Henry Edsworth White, the son of ornithologist Henry L. White. The generic name Conopophila is derived from the Ancient Greek konops 'gnat' and philos '-loving'. The image accompanying North's description in Emu (1910) was captioned with the name 'Alfred Honey-eater'. The informal names for this species also include White's honeyeater and inconspicuous honeyeater. The IOC World Bird List has proposed grey honeyeater as the common name for this species.

== Description ==
A tiny honeyeater, grey and discreet, with a nondescript colouration that is only faintly marked. The length is 10.5–12 cm (4.1–4.7 in).

The plumage of the upper body is generally cold grey, the lower parts paler, becoming browner until a moult. Tail and flight feathers are a blackish brown, and a slightly darker marking extends across the eye to the bill. The tips of the tail feathers are white, aging to buffish. The bill is relatively short for a honeyeater, slightly down-curved and grey, becoming black toward the tip. There is a pale and indistinct ring of feathers, tinted buff, around the eye. The colour of the iris is brown, the legs are steel grey.

Juveniles have a faintly yellowish cast to the thin eye-ring, that almost disappears as they mature, and on the pale grey feathers of the throat. The grey flight feathers of the immature birds have a yellow-green wash.

The grey honeyeater is similar in appearance to the Western gerygone (Gerygone fusca), yellow-rumped thornbill (Acanthiza chrysorrhoa) and others of the genus Acanthiza, all of which it often accompanies in mixed species flocks. Care should be taken to distinguish the grey honeyeater from the female redthroat (Pyrrholaemus brunneus)

=== Voice ===
The most common call of the grey honeyeater has been described as a piercing, metallic, quick, double squeak "chirra-wik-chirra-wik", or "cre-seek" and somewhat resembling the call of the white-bellied cuckooshrike (Coracina papuensis). It also makes a weak, grating, high-pitched tinkling or a plaintive series of notes given in quick succession, sounding like "troo-whee, troo-whee".

== Distribution and habitat ==
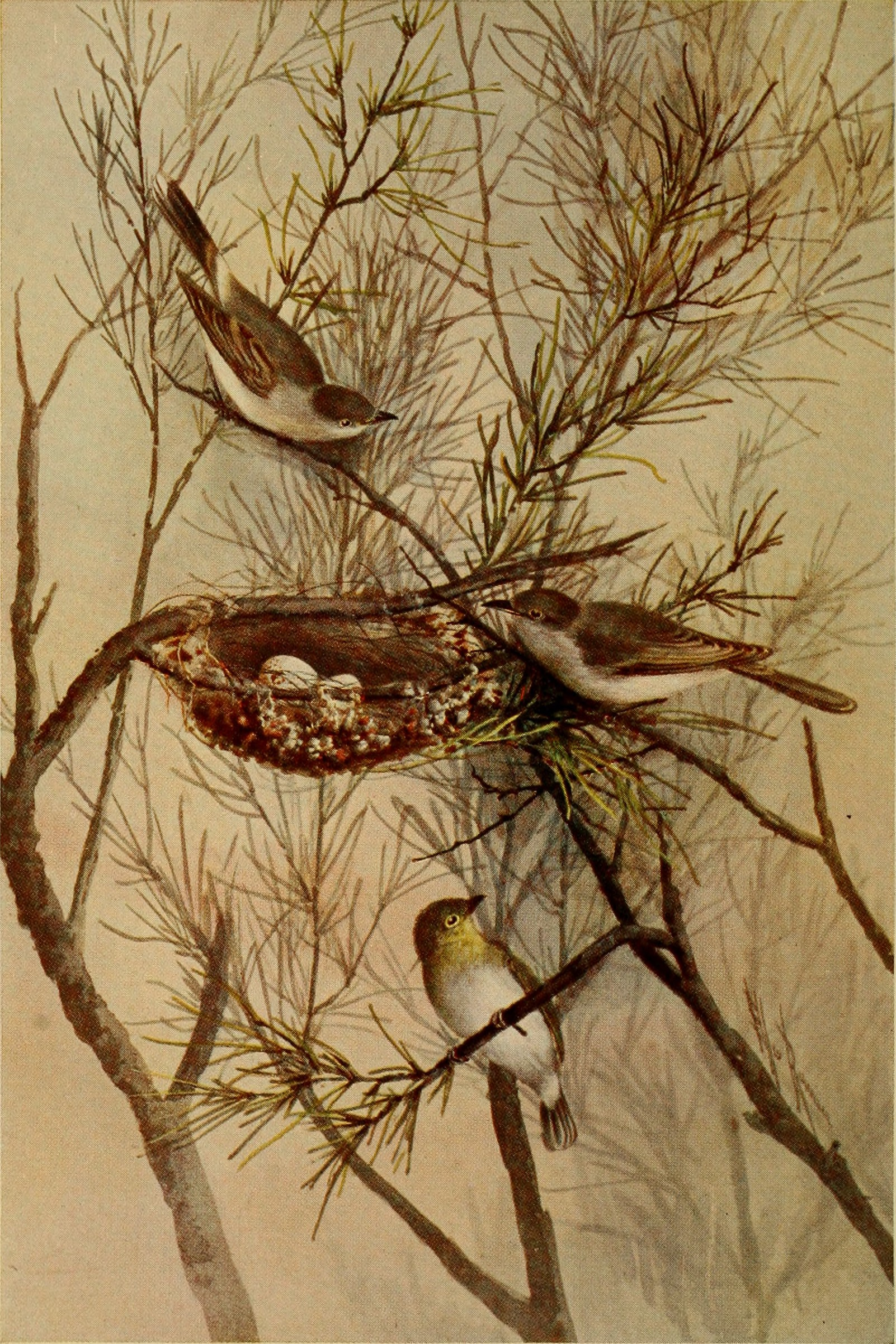
"The Alfred Honey-eater (Lacustroica whitei. North) (The lowest figure in youthful plumage) Drawing by Ellis Rowan". Emu. vol. 9. 1910

The grey honeyeater is found in a range extending across the mid-west to the centre of the Australian continent, especially in the Pilbara and Murchison regions of Western Australia, and southern and central Northern Territory. It is rare to uncommon and probably sedentary with some nomadic movement. The species is found in semi-arid mulga (Acacia aneura) and similar acacia scrublands. The occurrence of mistletoe may be an important factor in determining its distribution. Some good locations for finding the grey honeyeater are the Olive Pink Botanic Garden, Alice Springs, in the Northern Territory, and Wanjarri Nature Reserve, south of Wiluna, and Tom Price, in Western Australia.

== Behaviour ==
=== Breeding ===
The breeding season is August to November, which may extend through to May, if there is summer rain. The nest is a small, frail, untidy cup of fine grass stems, lined with hair and plant down, bound with spider web, hanging from slender twigs in the outer foliage of a mulga shrub. A clutch of 1 or 2 eggs, each measuring 17 mm × 13 mm (0.67 in × 0.51 in), is laid. The eggs are swollen oval and slightly glossy white, spotted with reddish-brown. Incubation is probably by both sexes, as is the feeding of nestlings and fledglings.

=== Feeding ===
The grey honeyeater is primarily insectivorous, busily gleaning the surface of foliage for lerp and similar insects or hovering to capture flying insects. It also feeds on nectar by piercing the deep, tubular flowers of species such as Eremophila, and on the nectar and berries of mistletoe.

== Conservation status ==
The grey honeyeater is classified as least concern on the IUCN Red List. It is considered as endangered in Western Australia. Threats are uncontrolled fires from which mulga takes many years to recover, and also grazing by introduced animals that damage the habitat.
