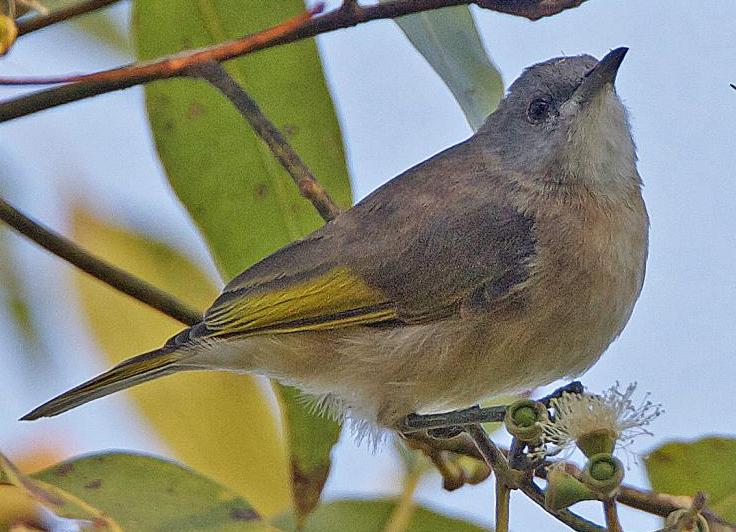
- Rufous-banded honeyeater (Conopophila albogularis)

Scientific classification
- Kingdom: Animalia
- Phylum: Chordata
- Class: Aves
- Order: Passeriformes
- Family: Meliphagidae
- Genus: Conopophila; Reichenbach, 1852

Type species
- Entomophila albogularis Gould, 1843

= Conopophila =

Genus of birds

Conopophila is a genus of bird in the family Meliphagidae. It contains the following species:

Image	Scientific name	Common name	Distribution
	Conopophila albogularis	Rufous-banded honeyeater	New Guinea and Northern Australia.
	Conopophila rufogularis	Rufous-throated honeyeater	Northern Australia.
	Conopophila whitei	Grey honeyeater	Central Australia.

The name is derived from the Greek word for gnat, conops, thus a lover of gnats.

Gallery
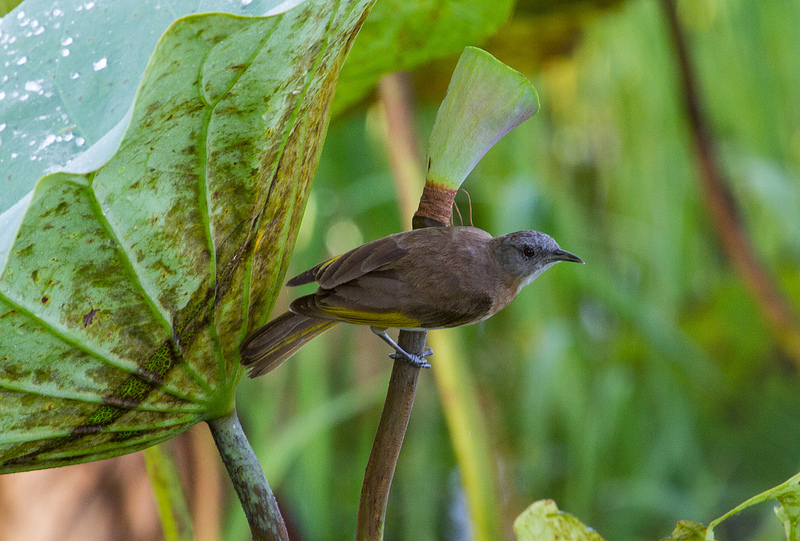
Rufous-banded honeyeater on lotus stem – Fogg Dam – Northern Territory – Australia

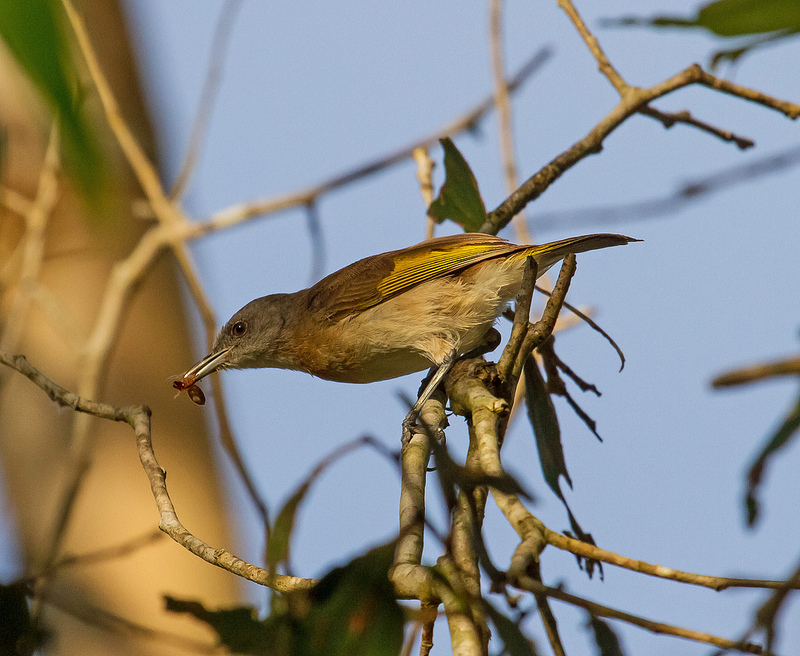
Rufous-banded honeyeater with insect – Fogg Dam – Northern Territory – Australia

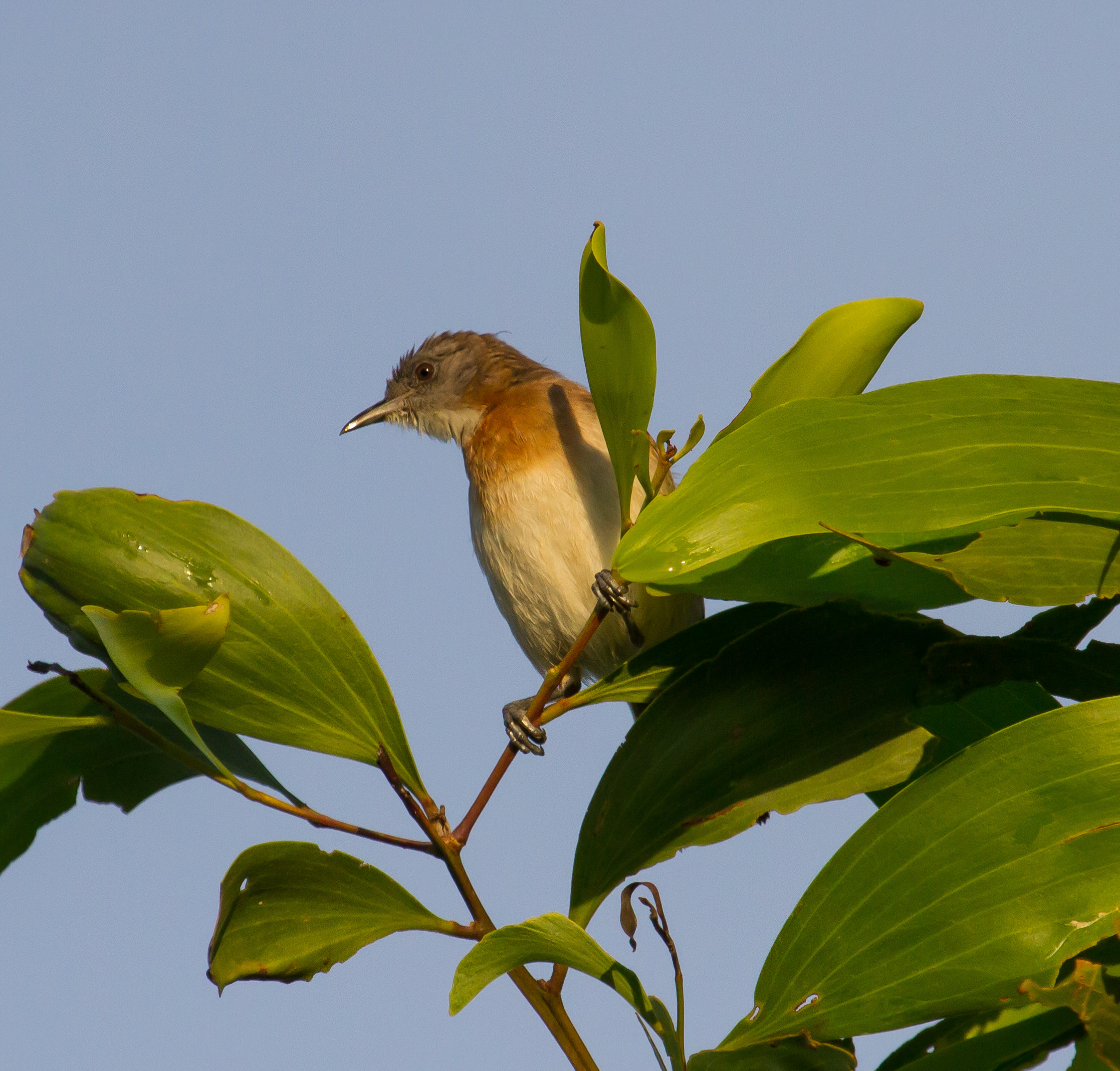
Rufous-banded honeyeater in black wattle – Fogg Dam – Northern Territory – Australia
