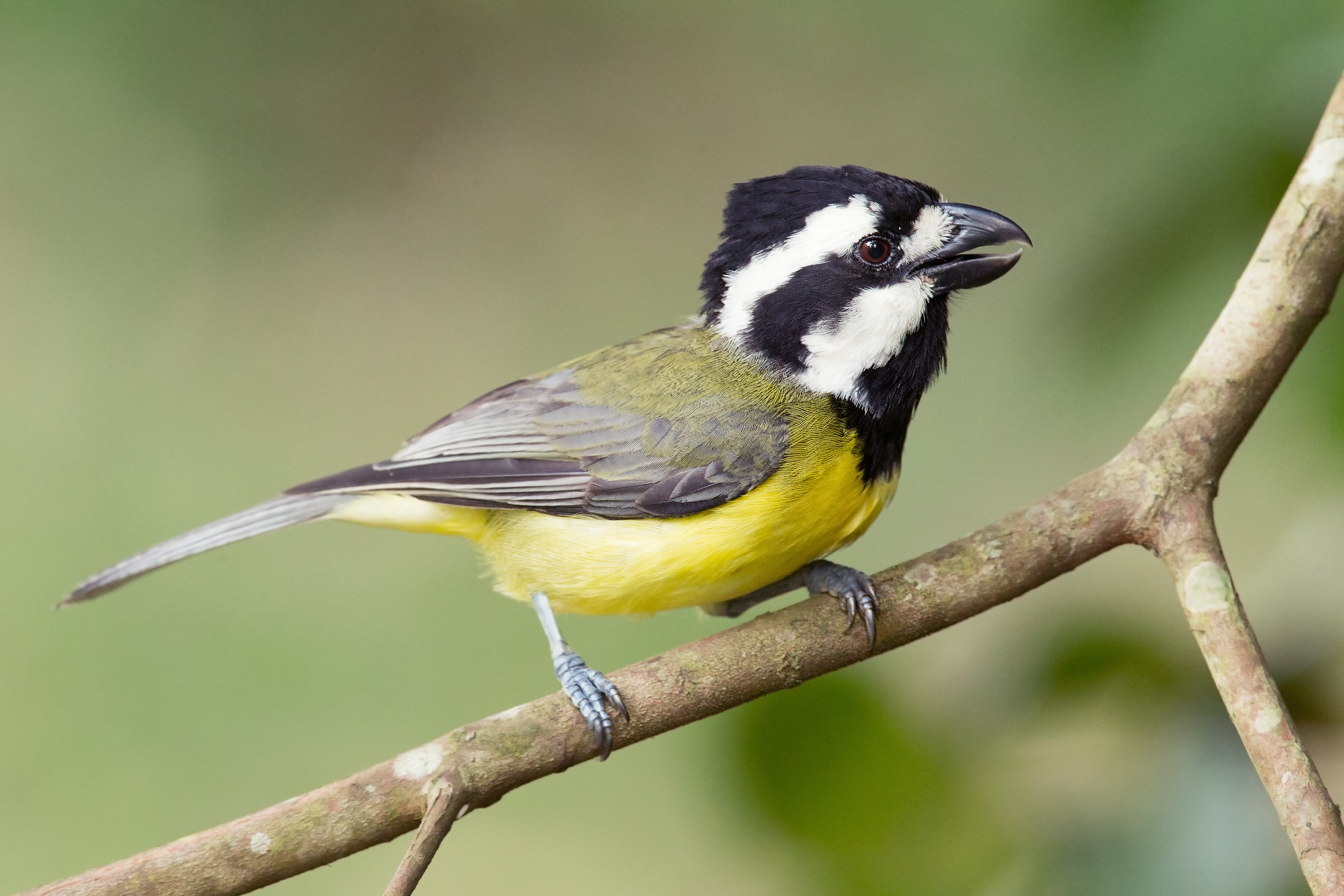
- Male
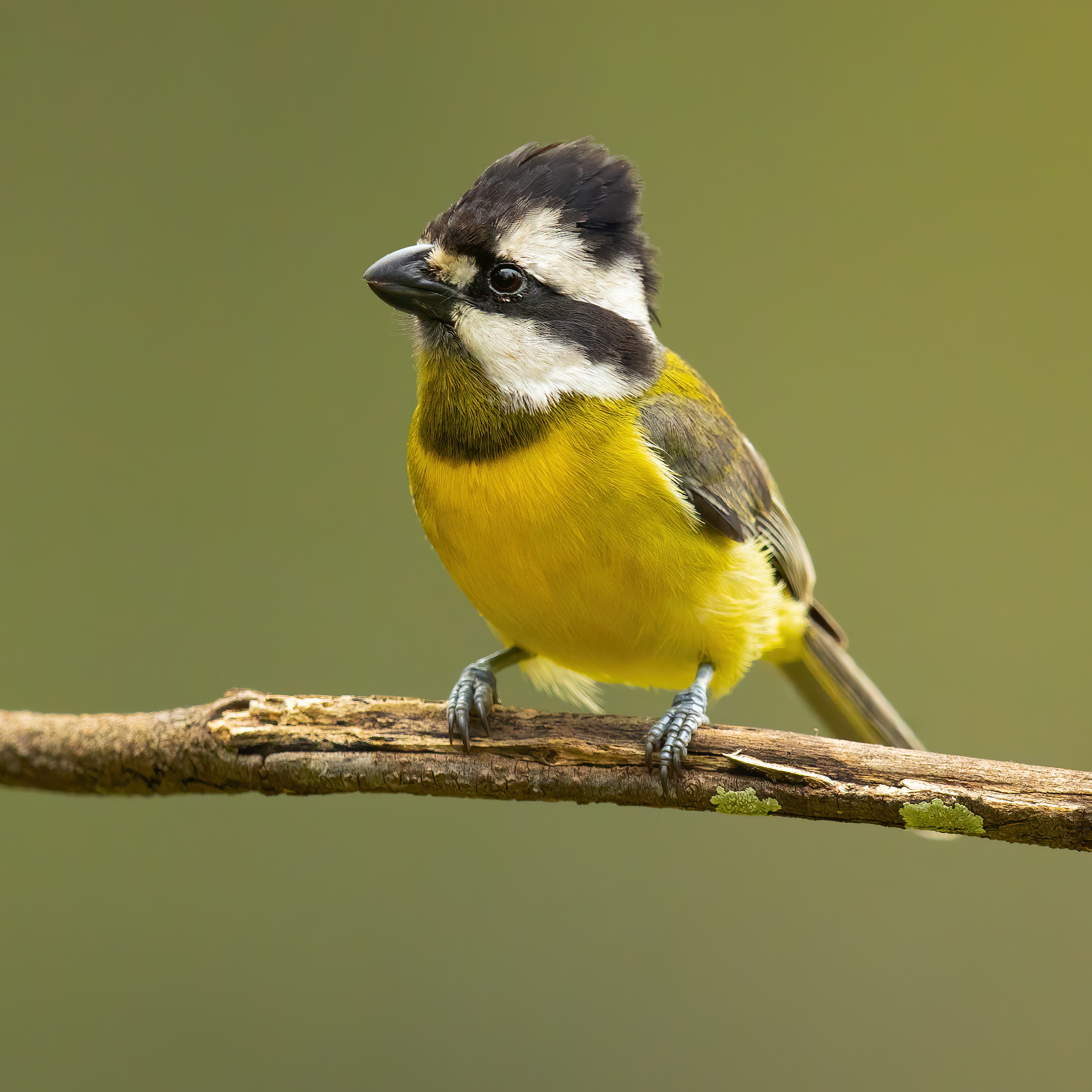
- Female

Conservation status
- Least Concern (IUCN 3.1)

Scientific classification
- Kingdom: Animalia
- Phylum: Chordata
- Class: Aves
- Order: Passeriformes
- Family: Falcunculidae
- Genus: Falcunculus
- Species: F. frontatus

Binomial name
- Falcunculus frontatus (Latham, 1801)

= Eastern shriketit =

Species of bird

The eastern shriketit (Falcunculus frontatus) is a species of passerine bird in the family Falcunculidae. It is also known as bark tit, crested tit or yellow-bellied tit.

It is found in south-eastern Australia from the southeast of South Australia, throughout Victoria, eastern New South Wales to southeastern Queensland, with some scattered occurrences further north and west in Queensland.

== Taxonomy ==
The eastern shriketit was first described by the English ornithologist John Latham in 1801 under the binomial name Lanius frontatus. It was named Falcunculus flavigulus by John Gould, which he quickly realised was a frontatus in female plumage.

Three subspecies of the crested shriketit (Falcunculus frontatus) were recognised as distinct species based on their widely disjunct distributions and plumage differences, so that F. frontatus was split from F. whitei and F. leucogaster following Schodde and Mason (1999). In appearance, the eastern shriketit differs from the northern shriketit (F. whitei), which has broad yellow wing-margins and brownish-grey wing coverts, and the western shriketit (F. leucogaster), which has a white belly, olive-grey wing-coverts and yellow-edged remiges.

The generic name Falcunculus is the diminutive of Late Latin falco 'falcon' and the specific epithet frontalis is from Latin frons 'forehead'.

The species is monotypic.

== Description ==
The eastern shriketit is 15–19 cm (5.9–7.5 in) in overall length, with a wingspan of 24–29 cm (9.4–11.4 in). The males weigh 26.5–40 g (0.9–1.4 oz) and the females 23–33 g (0.8–1.2 oz).

The eastern shriketit has a mantle, back and rump that are olive-brown to olive-green. The underparts are yellow. The head features broad white patches separated by a thick black eyeline with another black band running over the crown from the bill to the nape. The male has an erectable crest. It has a large bill with which to lever and strip bark. The throat of the male is black, whereas that of the female is olive-brown. Juveniles have a similar head pattern to adults but the throat, breast and belly are buffy-white, and the wings are browner.

=== Vocalisation ===
The call of the eastern shriketit is a weak, mellow and mournful whistle, sounding like whiert, whit-whit, wheeir. It also makes repeated stuttering or chuckling calls described as "knock-at-the-door", and can perfectly mimic many species within its habitat.

=== Similar species ===
The golden whistler (Pachycephala pectoralis) occupies a similar range and habitat to the eastern shriketit from which it is distinguished by a mostly black head, white throat with black breast-band, narrow bill and yellow plumage extending across the nape.

== Distribution and habitat ==
The eastern shriketit is endemic to Australia. It is found in the Atherton Tablelands of tropical Queensland, southward through New South Wales and Victoria, including the Murray-Darling basin, to the Mount Lofty Ranges and Fleurieu Peninsula of South Australia. It is commonest in north-central and coastal Victoria and east of the Great Dividing Range in New South Wales; its presence in Queensland is more scattered.

Its preferred habitat is the canopy of eucalypt forests and open woodlands, and to a lesser extent stands of mallee, cypress-pine, coastal tea-tree and banksia. It is also found in trees along rivers and occasionally in rainforests.

It is sedentary or locally nomadic.

== Behavior ==
=== Feeding ===
The eastern shriketit forages unobtrusively, either in pairs or small groups in the canopy of trees, levering up and tearing bark with its strong bill to reveal prey of spiders, beetles and insect larvae. As an avian example of tool-use, it has been observed holding a twig in its bill and poking it into a crevice to obtain concealed insects.

=== Breeding ===
The breeding season of the eastern shriketit is from late August to early January, with a double brood usual in the north of its range and a single brood more common in the cooler south. The nest is a deep cup of bark fibre bound with spider-web, and lined with fine grass and lichen. It is usually placed among the highest twigs of a eucalypt sapling, from 5–30 m above ground where it is protected from the reach of predators. A clutch of 2 or 3 eggs, whitish with brown or slate-grey spots, and measuring 24 mm × 15 mm (0.9 in × 0.6 in), is incubated for 15 or 16 days mainly by the female. The young are altricial and nidicolous, fledging 14 to 17 days after hatching and then tended by both parents (predominantly the female) for 3 to 6 months.

== Conservation status and threats ==
The pallid cuckoo (Cacomantis pallidus), fan-tailed cuckoo (C. flabelliformis) and the brush cuckoo (C. variolosus) are brood parasites of the eastern shriketit. Feral and domestic cats sometimes predate the nests. Other threats include loss of habitat due to wildfires and the destruction of woodlands for human activities, such as urbanization and logging.

Although generally uncommon to rare with a decreasing population, the eastern shriketit is widely distributed and considered by the IUCN to be a species of least concern.
