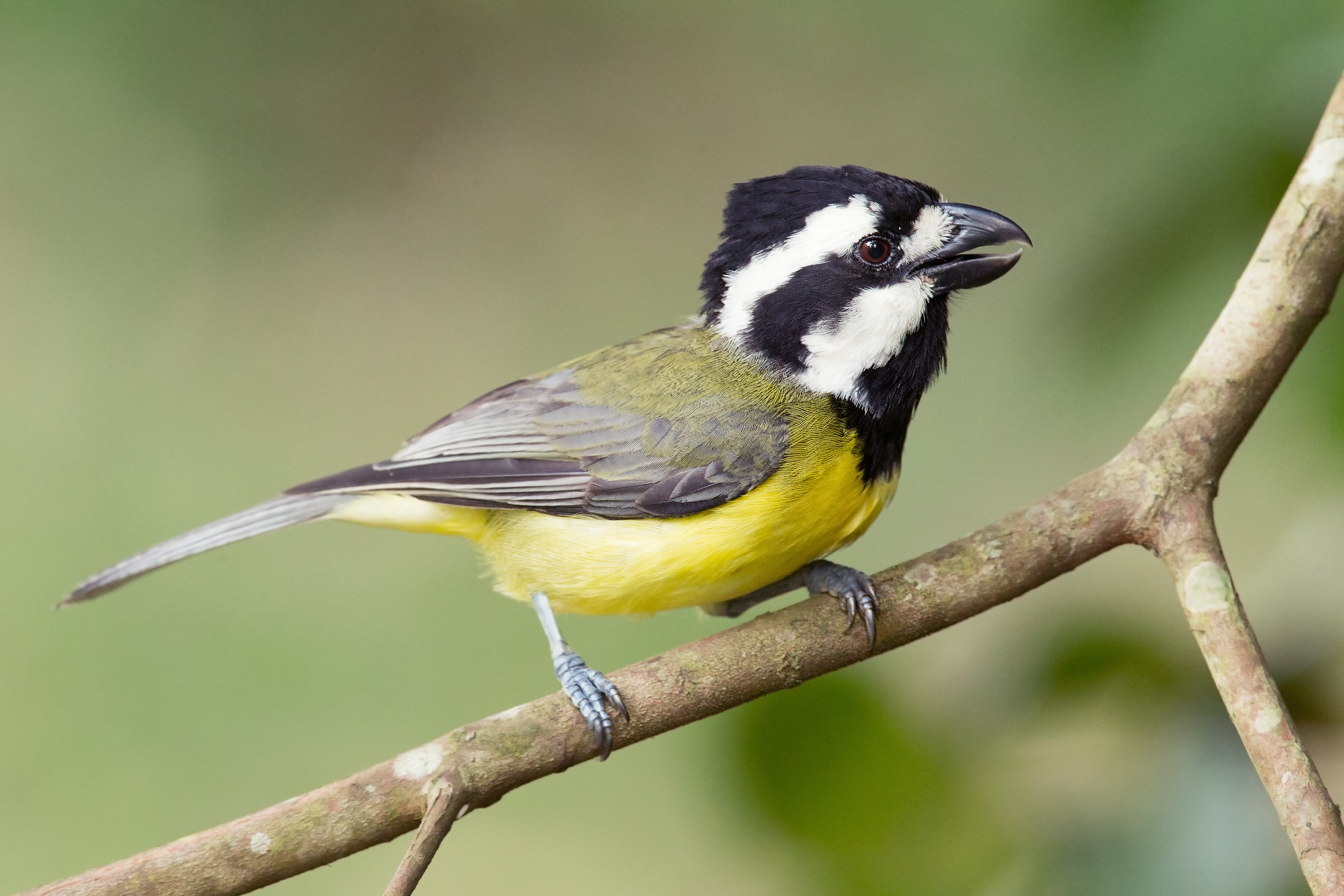
- Eastern shriketit male
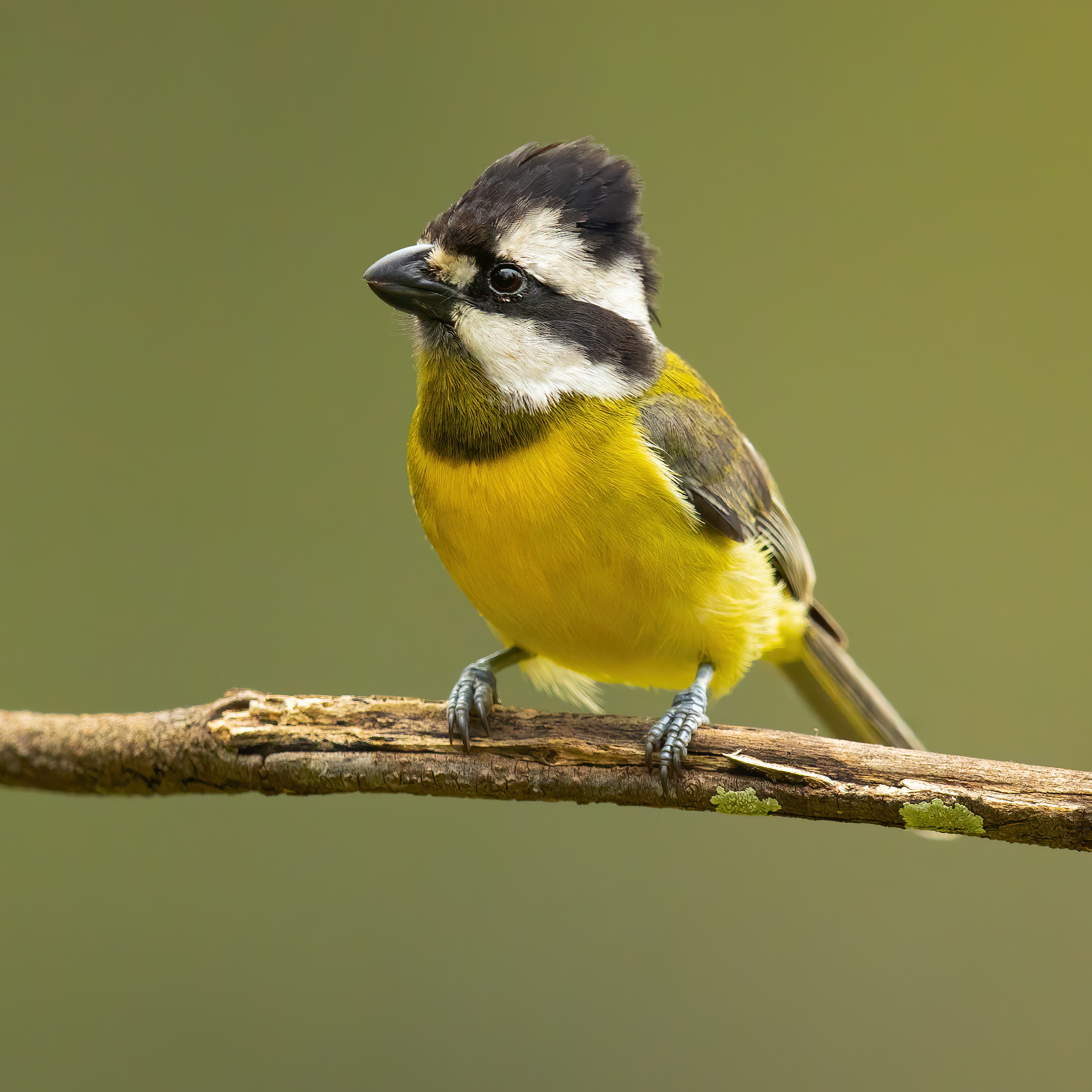
- Eastern shriketit female

Scientific classification
- Kingdom: Animalia
- Phylum: Chordata
- Class: Aves
- Order: Passeriformes
- Superfamily: Orioloidea
- Family: Falcunculidae
- Genus: Falcunculus; Vieillot, 1816

Type species
- Lanius frontatus Latham, 1801

Species
- See text

= Shriketit =

Falcunculus

Species of bird

The shriketits are a group of three species of birds in the genus Falcunculus endemic to Australia where they inhabit open eucalypt forest and woodland.

== Taxonomy and distribution ==
=== Species ===
Three species are recognized, with disjunct ranges:

Image	Common name	Scientific name	Description and Distribution
	Northern shriketit (White's shrike-tit)	F. whitei	Campbell, AJ, 1910: Originally described as a separate species. It is found in the Kimberley region of north-western Australia and the Top End of the Northern Territory
	Western shriketit (white-bellied shrike-tit)	F. leucogaster	Gould, 1838: sparsely distributed in south-western Western Australia
	Eastern shriketit	F. frontatus	(Latham, 1801): is in south-eastern Australia from the Lower South-East of South Australia, coastally and in the Murray-Darling Basin to south-eastern Queensland, with some scattered occurrences further north and west in Queensland

== Description ==
Males are larger than females in wing length, weight, and bill-size. Males have black throats, while females have olive green throats, and both sexes have bold black and white markings on the face.

== Behaviour ==
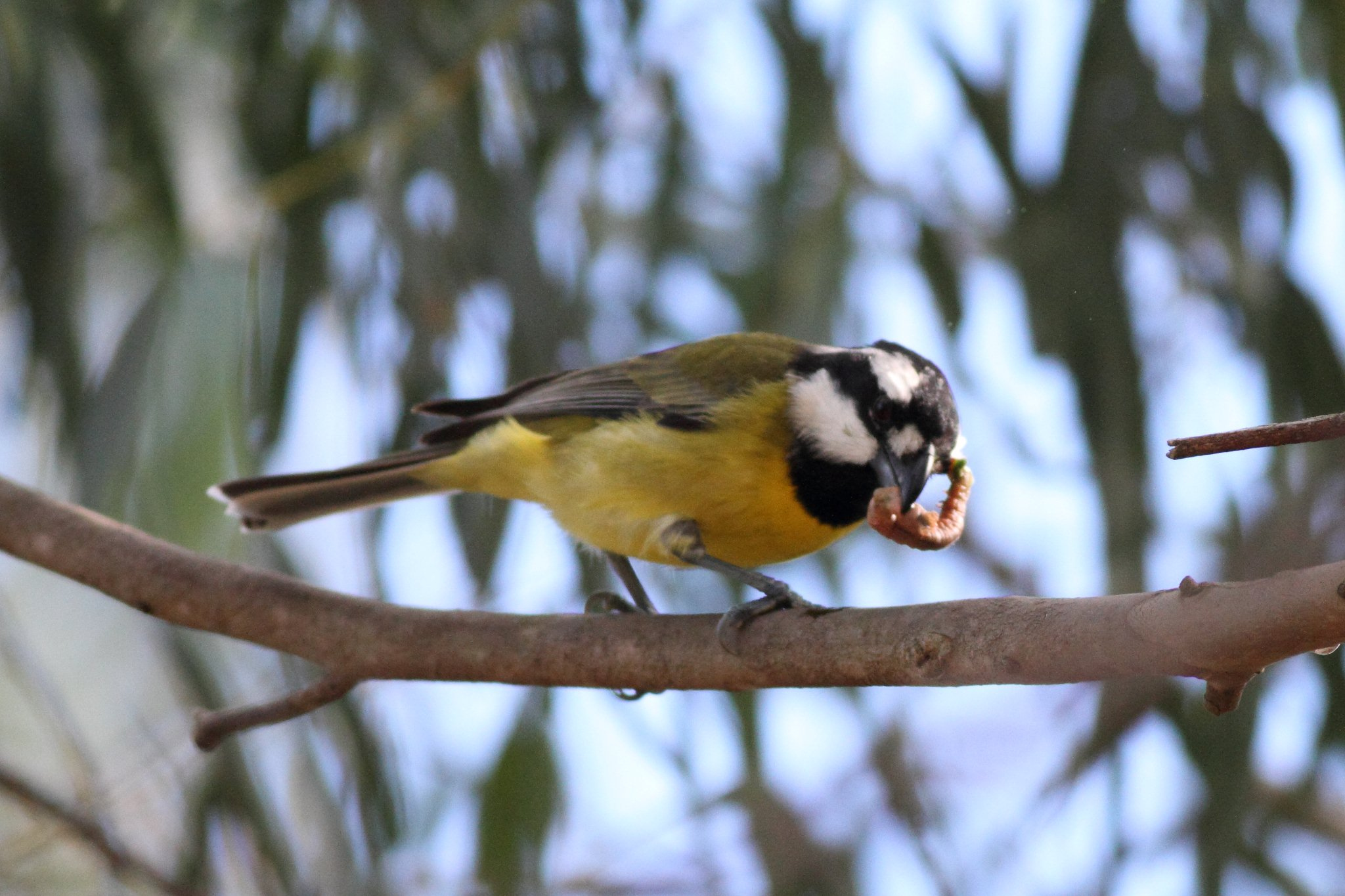
Male eastern shriketit eating a caterpillar

They feed mainly on insects, spiders and, sometimes, particularly during the breeding season, young birds. Thistle seeds are also taken. They have a parrot-like bill, used for distinctive bark-stripping behaviour, which gains them access to invertebrates. The bird is unobtrusive, and the sound of the bark strips being torn off trees provides an indication of their presence. They nest high in a eucalyptus tree, in a fork of a branch, both sexes sharing the incubation and the rearing of the young. There may be two broods.
