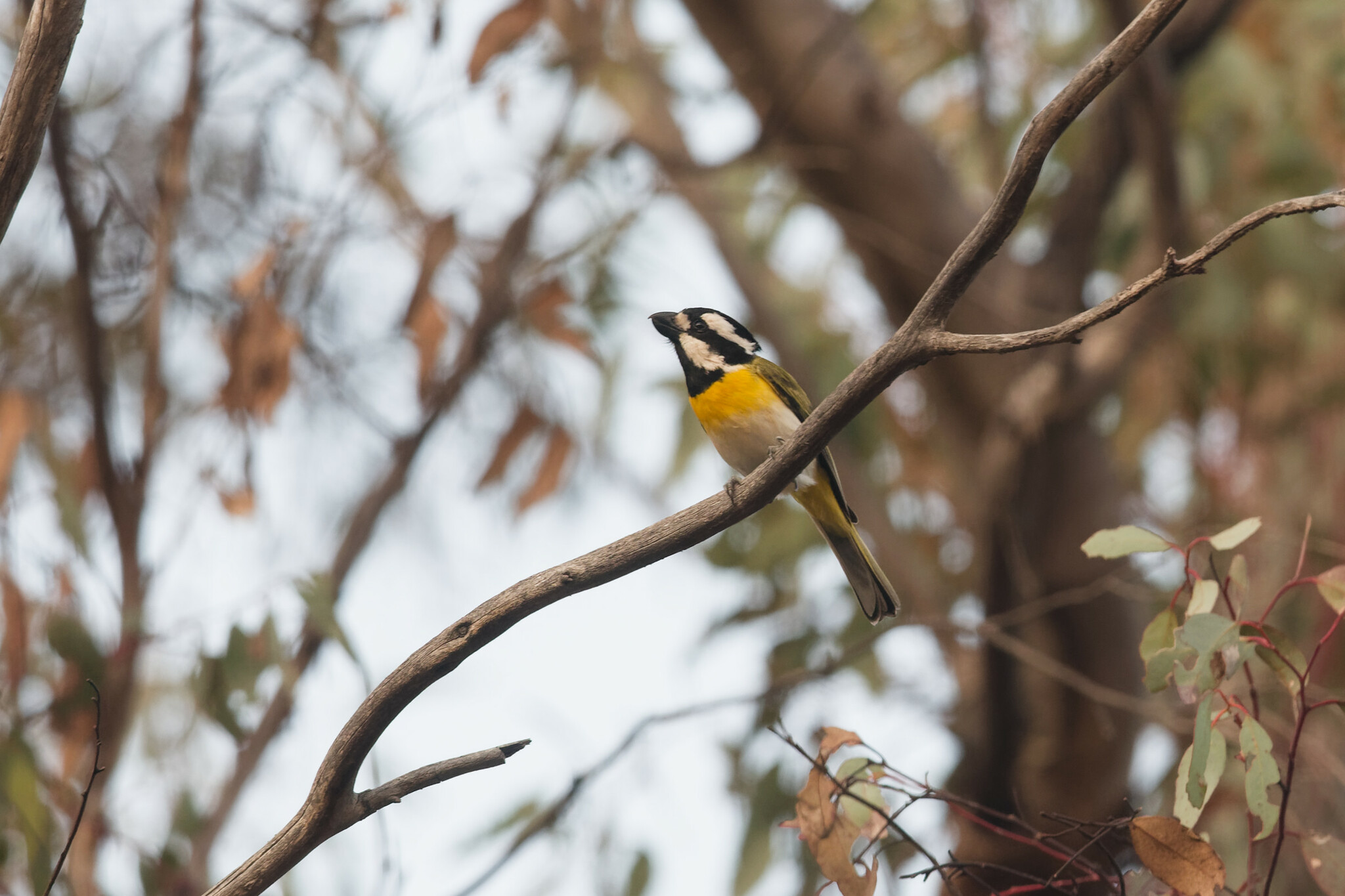

Conservation status
- Least Concern (IUCN 3.1)

Scientific classification
- Kingdom: Animalia
- Phylum: Chordata
- Class: Aves
- Order: Passeriformes
- Family: Falcunculidae
- Genus: Falcunculus
- Species: F. leucogaster

Binomial name
- Falcunculus leucogaster Gould, 1838

= Western shriketit =

Species of bird

The western shriketit (Falcunculus leucogaster) is a species of bird in the family Falcunculidae. It is sparsely distributed across Southwest Australia.
