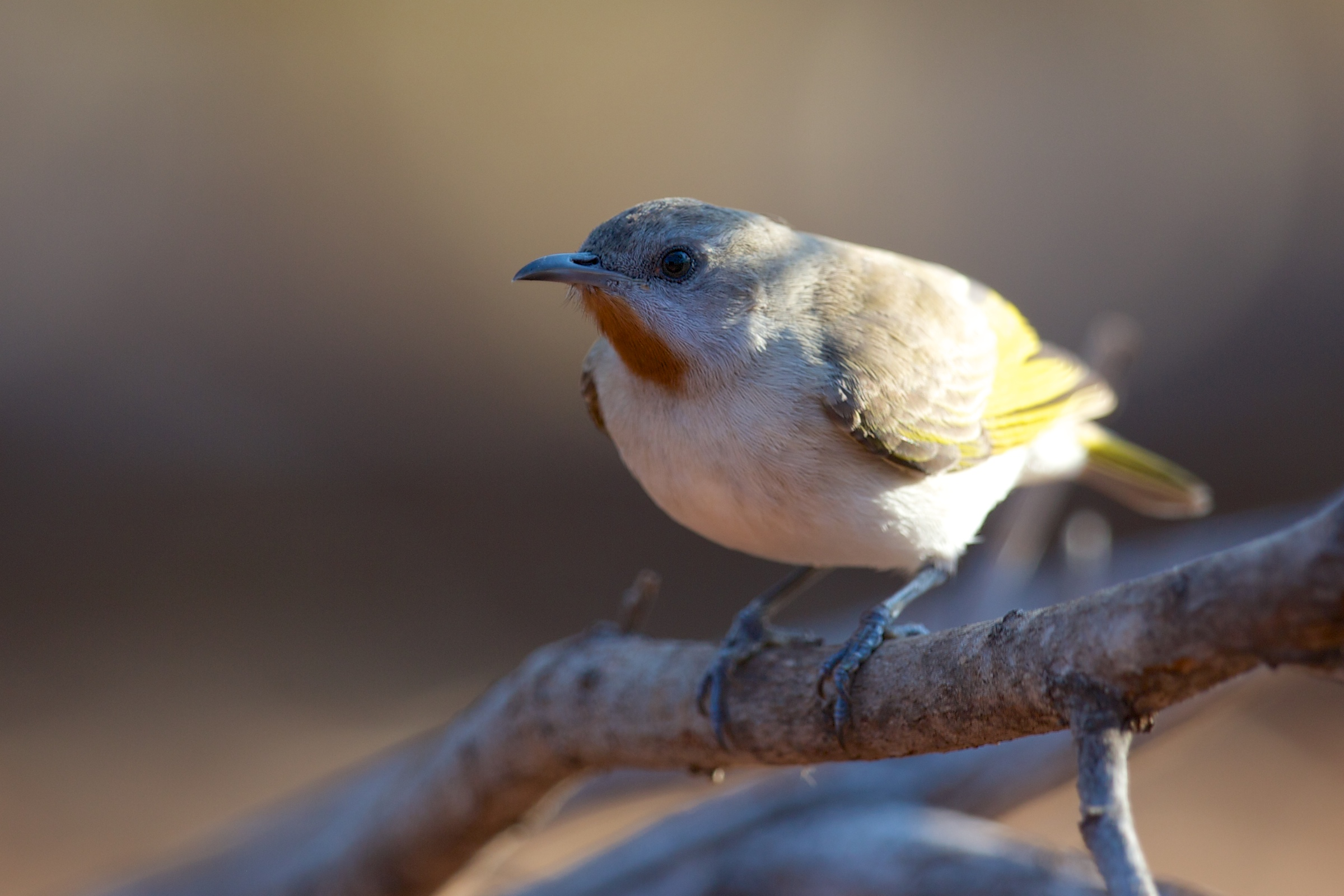

Conservation status
- Least Concern (IUCN 3.1)

Scientific classification
- Kingdom: Animalia
- Phylum: Chordata
- Class: Aves
- Order: Passeriformes
- Family: Meliphagidae
- Genus: Conopophila
- Species: C. rufogularis

Binomial name
- Conopophila rufogularis (Gould, 1843)

= Rufous-throated honeyeater =

Species of bird

The rufous-throated honeyeater (Conopophila rufogularis) is a species of bird in the family Meliphagidae. It is endemic to northern Australia.

Its natural habitat is subtropical or tropical mangrove forests, but it also functions well in urban environments due to the lack of nest predators.
