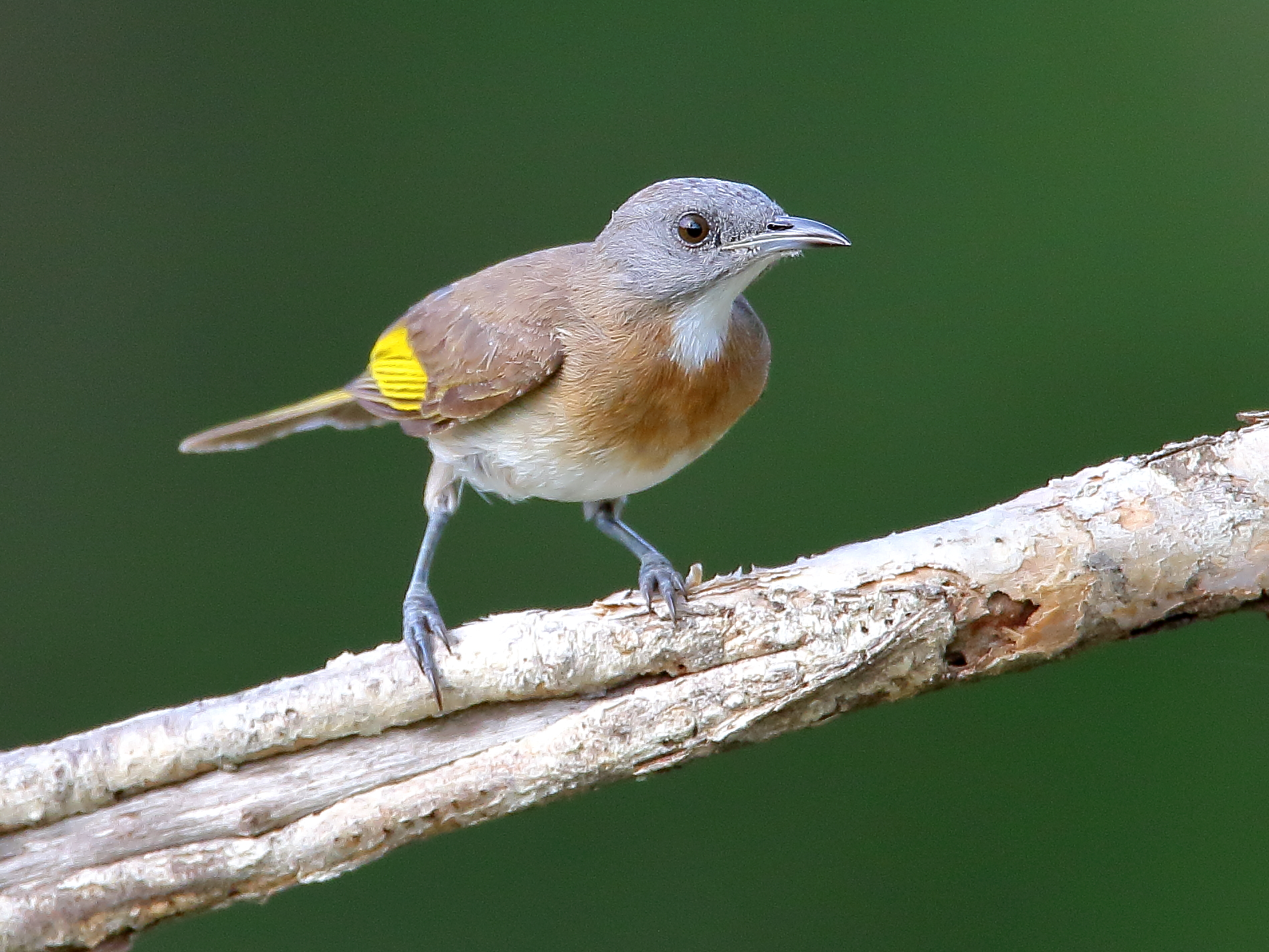

Conservation status
- Least Concern (IUCN 3.1)

Scientific classification
- Kingdom: Animalia
- Phylum: Chordata
- Class: Aves
- Order: Passeriformes
- Family: Meliphagidae
- Genus: Conopophila
- Species: C. albogularis

Binomial name
- Conopophila albogularis (Gould, 1843)

= Rufous-banded honeyeater =

Species of bird

The rufous-banded honeyeater (Conopophila albogularis) is a species of bird in the family Meliphagidae. It is found in the Aru Islands, New Guinea and northern Australia. Its natural habitat is subtropical or tropical mangrove forests. The rufous-banded honeyeater is considered one of the most common small birds in the suburban ecosystem of Darwin, Australia, notable because its lack of introduced bird species. It is also native to Queensland, Australia. Ornithologist F. Salomonsen recognized two subspecies of rufous-banded honeyeater, Conopophila albogularis and Conopophila mimikae but J. Ford disagreed with this subspeciation.
