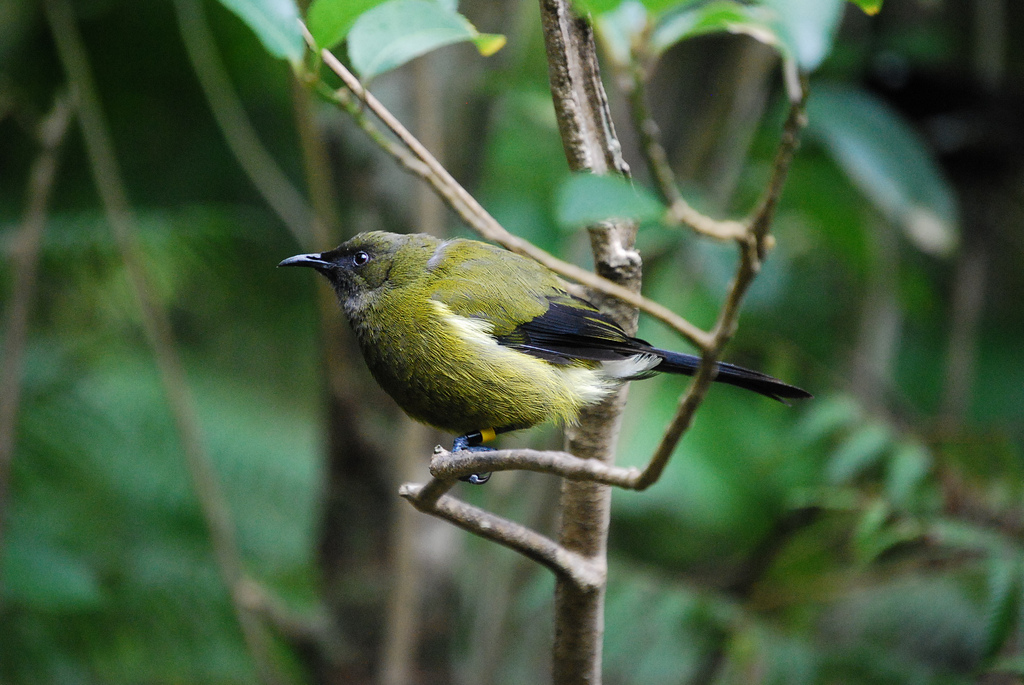
- New Zealand bellbird (Anthornis melanura)

Scientific classification
- Kingdom: Animalia
- Phylum: Chordata
- Class: Aves
- Order: Passeriformes
- Family: Meliphagidae
- Genus: Anthornis; G.R. Gray, 1840

Type species
- The New Zealand bellbird (Anthornis melanura)

Species
- Anthornis melanura; Anthornis melanocephala †

= Anthornis =

Genus of birds

Anthornis is a bird genus in the honeyeater family (Meliphagidae). Its members are called bellbirds. According to genetic data, it is a sister genus to Prosthemadera.

It contains the following species:

Image	Name	Common name
	Anthornis melanura	New Zealand bellbird
	†Anthornis melanocephala (extinct)	Chatham Islands bellbird

They are named bellbirds because their call sounds like a bell. Young male bellbirds copy the calls of neighbouring older males. Sometimes two males can sing in almost perfect unison because one has been copying the other.
