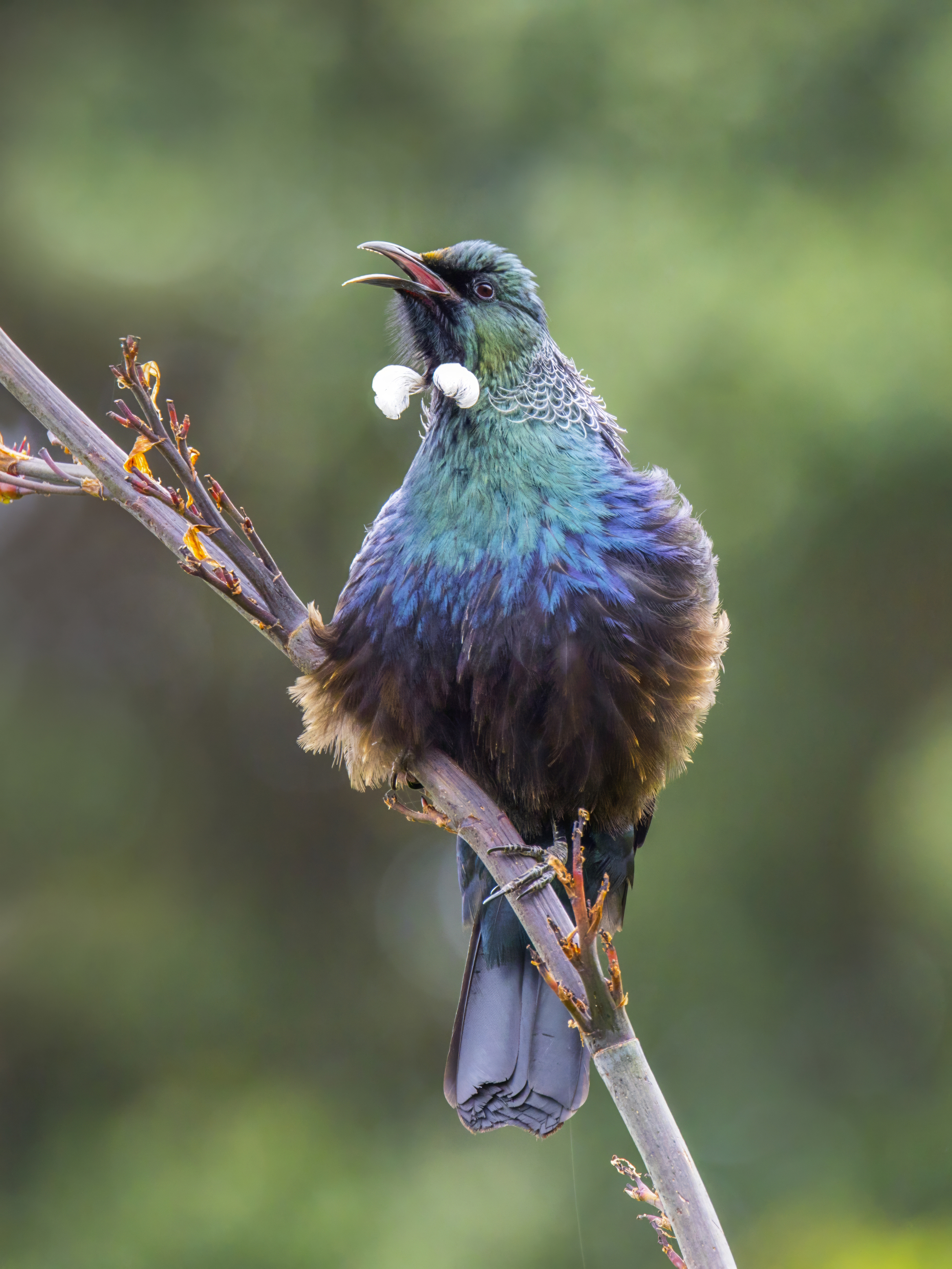

Conservation status
- Least Concern (IUCN 3.1)

Scientific classification
- Kingdom: Animalia
- Phylum: Chordata
- Class: Aves
- Order: Passeriformes
- Family: Meliphagidae
- Genus: Prosthemadera; Gray, GR, 1840
- Species: P. novaeseelandiae

Binomial name
- Prosthemadera novaeseelandiae (Gmelin, JF, 1788)

= Tūī =

Species of bird endemic to New Zealand

The tūī (Prosthemadera novaeseelandiae) is a medium-sized bird native to New Zealand. It is blue, green, and bronze coloured with a distinctive white throat tuft (poi). It is an endemic passerine bird of New Zealand, and the only species in the genus Prosthemadera. It is one of the largest species in the diverse Australasian honeyeater family Meliphagidae, and one of two living species of that family found in New Zealand, the other being the New Zealand bellbird (Anthornis melanura). The tūī has a wide distribution in the archipelago, ranging from the subtropical Kermadec Islands to the sub-Antarctic Auckland Islands, as well as the main islands.

== Taxonomy ==
Europeans first encountered the tūī in 1770 at Queen Charlotte Sound on the north coast of New Zealand's South Island during Captain James Cook's first voyage to the Pacific Ocean. Specimens were brought back to England and an engraving of a tūī by the English naturalist Peter Brown, which he called "The New Zeland creeper", was published in 1776. The tūī was seen on all three of Cook's voyages. Cook's account of his second voyage to the Pacific was published in 1777 and included a description and an illustration of the tūī. He used the names "poly-bird" and "poe-bird". He praised the bird: "The flesh is most delicious, and was the greatest luxury the woods afforded us." In 1782 the English ornithologist John Latham included the tūī as the "poë bee-eater" in his book A General Synopsis of Birds. Latham described a specimen in the Leverian Museum in London. No author had introduced a scientific name, but when in 1788 the German naturalist Johann Friedrich Gmelin revised and expanded Carl Linnaeus's Systema Naturae, he included the tūī with a short description, coined the binomial name Merops novaeseelandiae and cited the publications by Brown, Cook and Latham. The tūī is now the only species placed in the genus Prosthemadera that was introduced in 1840 by the English zoologist George Gray. The genus name combines the Ancient Greek prosthema meaning "appendage" with dera meaning "neck".

Two subspecies are recognised:

- P. n. novaeseelandiae (Gmelin, JF, 1788) – North, South, Stewart and satellites, Kermadec Islands (northeast of North Island) and Auckland Islands (south of South Island; New Zealand)
- P. n. chathamensis Hartert, EJO, 1928 – Chatham Islands (east of South Island, New Zealand)

The bird's name comes from the Māori language, although there are 14 other Māori names for the tūī, including "kōkō". The plural is tūī in modern New Zealand English, or ngā tūī in Māori usage; some speakers still use the '-s' suffix to produce the Anglicised form tūīs to indicate plurality, but this practice is becoming less common. For many years the prevailing spelling was tui without the macrons that indicate long vowels, but spelling Māori loanwords with macrons is now common in New Zealand English. The International Ornithologists' Union (IOC), which has a policy of not using accents, lists Tui as the bird's English name. Early European colonists called it the parson bird or mocking-bird but these names are no longer used.

The closest living relative to tūī is the New Zealand bellbird; genetic analysis indicates its ancestor diverged from a lineage that gave rise to the New Zealand and Chatham bellbirds around 5 million years ago. The cladogram below shows this relationship:

- - - Plain honeyeater (Pycnopygius ixoides)
    - Marbled honeyeater (Pycnopygius cinereus)
  - - - Tūī (Prosthemadera novaeseelandiae)
      - - New Zealand bellbird (Anthornis melanura)
        - Chatham bellbird (Anthornis melanocephala)

== Description ==
The tūī is a large honeyeater, 27 to 32 cm (11–13 in) in length. The Chatham Islands subspecies is larger on average than the nominate subspecies, and heavier. Males tend to be heavier than females. Nominate males weigh between 65–150 g (2.3–5.3 oz), and females 58–105 g (2.0–3.7 oz). Males of the Chatham subspecies are 89–240 g (3.1–8.5 oz) and females 89–170 g (3.1–6.0 oz).

At first glance the bird appears completely black except for a small tuft of white feathers at its neck and a small white wing patch, causing it to resemble a parson in clerical attire. On closer inspection (see image) it can be seen that tūī have brown feathers on the back and flanks, a multicoloured iridescent sheen that varies with the angle from which the light strikes them, and a dusting of small, white-shafted feathers on the back and sides of the neck that produce a lacy collar.

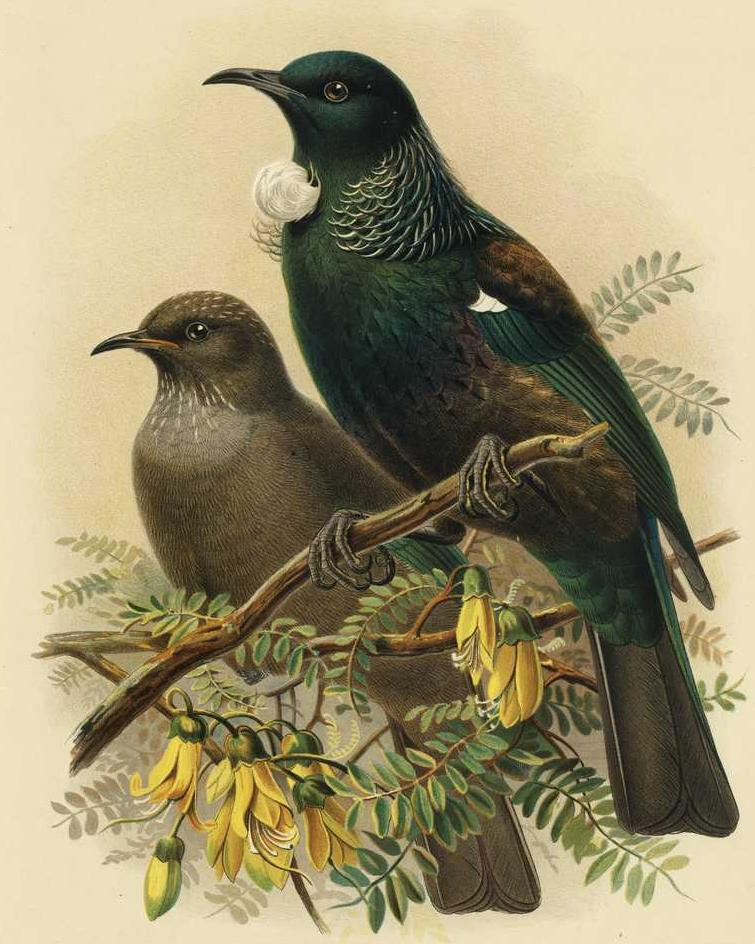
Painting of adult and young tūī

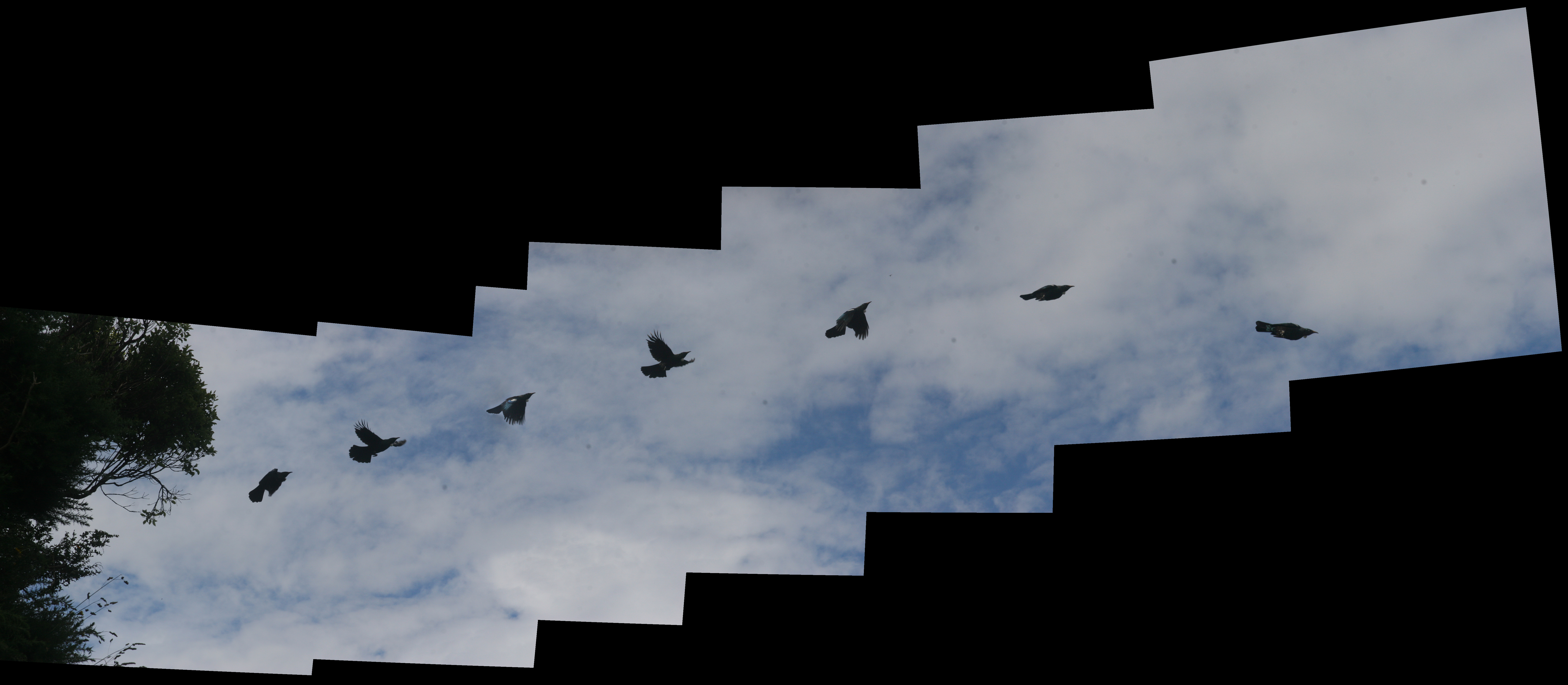
Several photos showing a tūī in flight

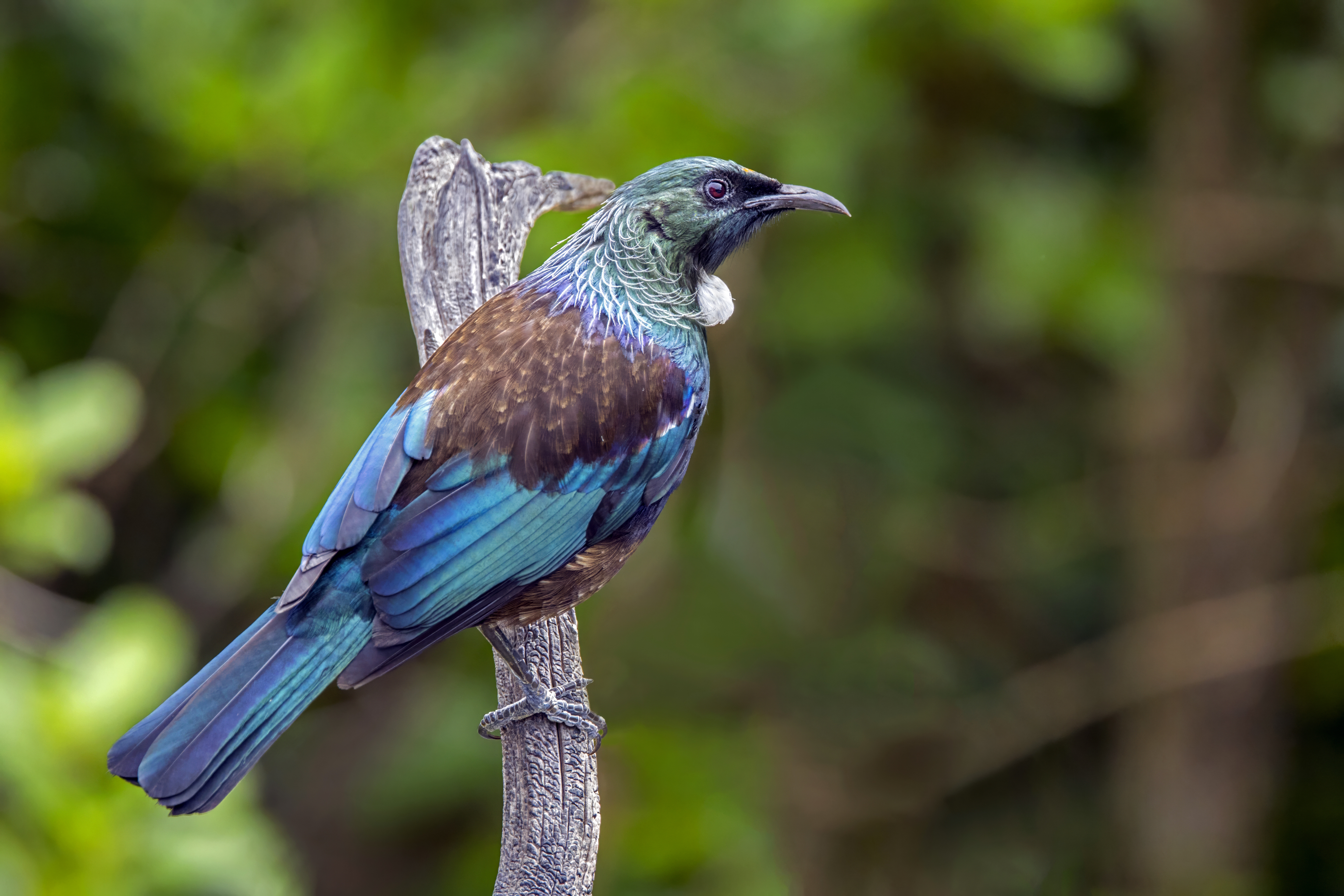

== Distribution and habitat ==
Tūī are native to New Zealand, and are found throughout the country, particularly the North Island, the west and south coasts of the South Island, Stewart Island / Rakiura and the Chatham Islands, where an endangered sub-species particular to these islands exists. Other populations live on Raoul Island in the Kermadecs, and in the Auckland Islands (where, with the New Zealand bellbird, it is the most southerly species of honeyeater). Traditionally, Māori ate tūī that had been preserved in calabashes or gourds. Populations have declined considerably since European settlement, mainly as a result of widespread habitat destruction and predation by mammalian invasive species.

Nonetheless, the species is considered secure and has made recoveries in some areas, particularly after removal of livestock has allowed vegetation to recover. Predation by introduced species remains a threat, particularly brushtail possums (which eat eggs and chicks), cats, stoats, the common myna (which competes with tūī for food and sometimes takes eggs), blackbirds, and rats.

Tūī prefer broadleaf forests at low altitudes, although have been recorded up to 1500 metres. They will tolerate quite small remnant patches, regrowth, exotic plantations and well-vegetated suburbs. They are one of the most common birds found in urban Wellington. Tūī are usually seen singly, in pairs, or in small family groups, but will congregate in large numbers at suitable food sources, often in company with silvereyes, bellbirds, or kererū (New Zealand pigeon) in any combination. Generally, when interspecific competition for the same food resources among New Zealand's two species of honeyeater occurs, there is a hierarchy with the tūī at the top and bellbirds subordinate. The latter are thus frequently chased off by tūī at a food source such as a flowering flax plant.

== Behaviour and ecology ==
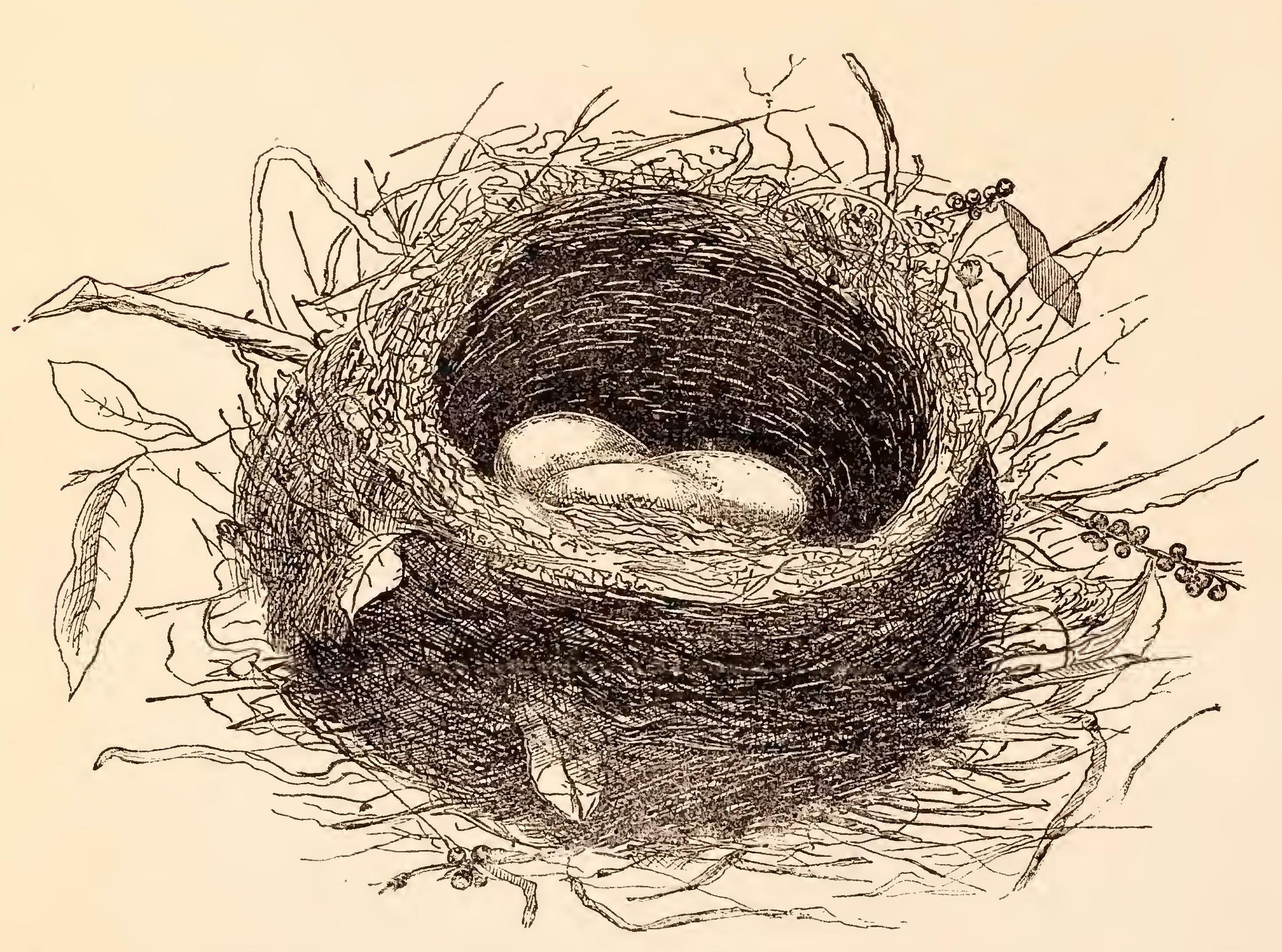
1888 illustration of a tūī nest

Male tūī can be extremely aggressive, chasing all other birds (large and small) from their territory with loud flapping and sounds akin to rude human speech. This is especially true of other tūī when possession of a favoured feeding tree is impinged. Birds will often erect their body feathers in order to appear larger in an attempt to intimidate a rival. They have even been known to mob harriers and magpies.

The powered flight of tūī is quite loud as they have developed short wide wings, giving excellent maneuverability in the dense forest they prefer, but requiring rapid flapping. They can be seen to perform a mating display of rising at speed in a vertical climb in clear air, before stalling and dropping into a powered dive, then repeating. Much of this behaviour is more notable during the breeding season of early spring—September and October. Females alone build nests of twigs, grasses and mosses.

=== Feeding ===
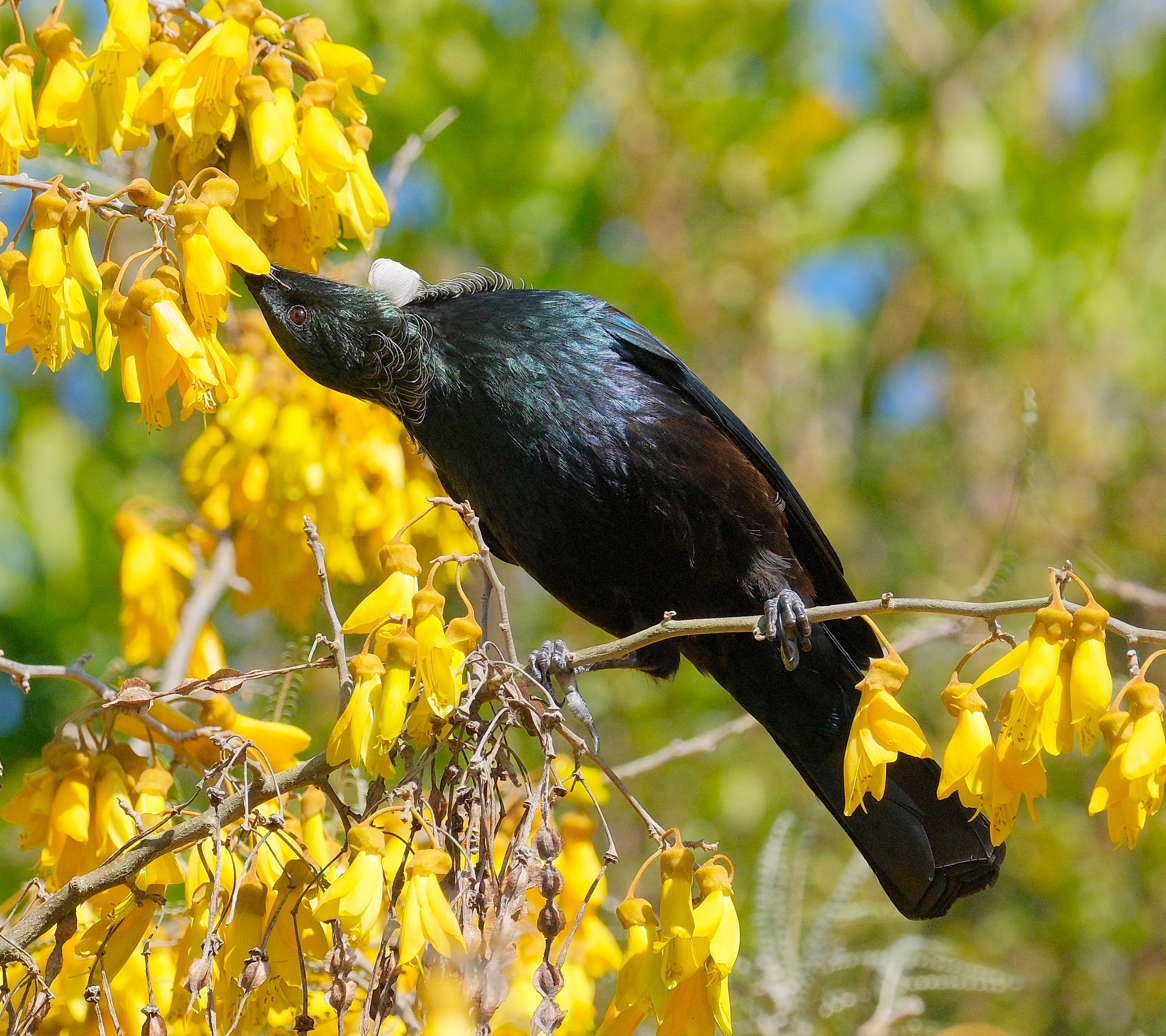
Tūī feeding on kōwhai flower

Nectar is the normal diet but fruit and insects are frequently eaten, and pollen and seeds more occasionally. Particularly popular is the New Zealand flax, whose nectar sometimes ferments, resulting in the tūī flying in a fashion that suggests that they might be drunk. They are the main pollinators of flax, kōwhai, kaka beak and some other plants. Note that the flowers of the three plants mentioned are similar in shape to the tūī's beak—a vivid example of mutualistic coevolution.

=== Breeding ===
The large untidy shallow cup-shaped nest is built by both sexes, but the female does most of the work. The eggs usually have a pale pink or white background with blotches of pale red mostly at the larger end. The clutch is usually 4 eggs and the average size of an eggs is 27.5 mm × 20.3 mm (1.08 in × 0.80 in). The eggs are incubated by the female alone for 14 days. Both sexes feed the young and remove the faecal sacs. The chicks fledge after around 20 days. The parents continue to feed the fledglings for another couple of weeks. The birds are nidicolous.

=== Songs and calls ===
Tūī singing 1
Tūī singing at Johnsonville in Wellington

Tūī singing 2
Tūī singing at Trelissick Park in Wellington

Tūī are known for their noisy, unusual, sometimes soulful calls, different for each individual, that combine bellbird-like notes with clicks, cackles, timber-like creaks and groans, and wheezing sounds.

Tūī have a complex variety of songs and calls, much like parrots. They also resemble parrots in their ability to clearly imitate human speech, and were trained by Māori to replicate complex speech. They also re-create sounds like glass shattering, car alarms, classical music and advertising jingles.

All birds have a sound producing organ called a syrinx, which is typically controlled with two sets of muscles. Songbirds or passerines like tūī have nine pairs of muscles giving them the ability to produce much more complex vocalisations, and they can be seen to be very physically involved with their songs. Their dual voice box allow tūī to make two sounds at the same time. Tūī song also exhibits geographical, microgeographic, seasonal, sex and individual variation. Tūī will also sing at night, especially around the full moon period.

== Gallery ==
Tūī

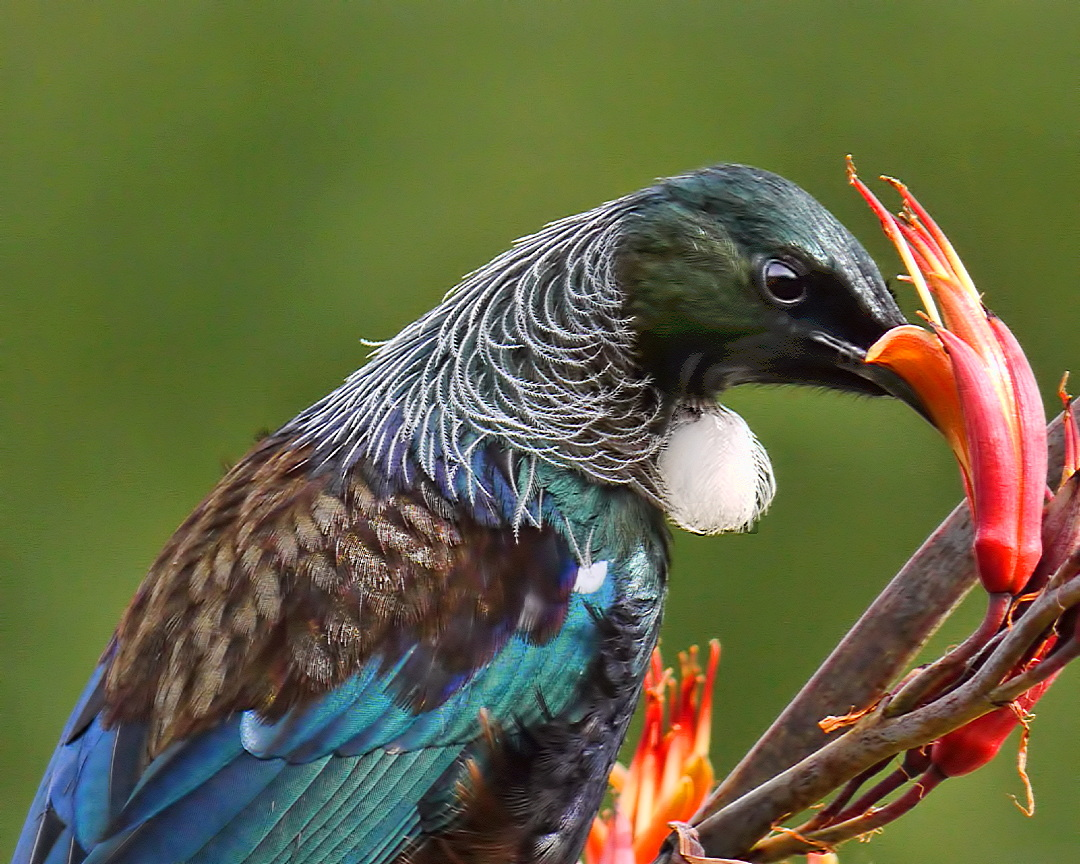
Tūī feeding on harakeke

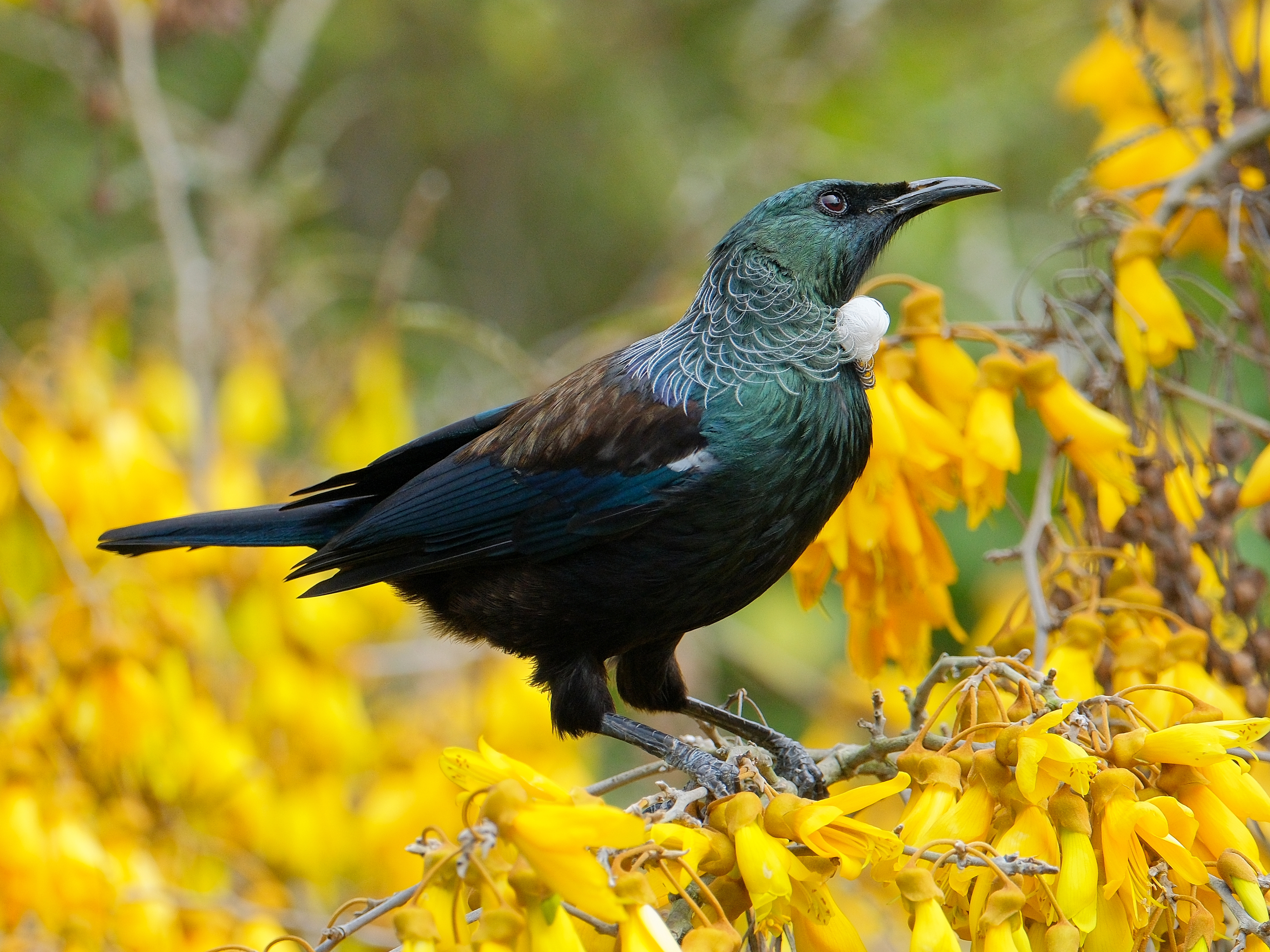
Tūī on kōwhai

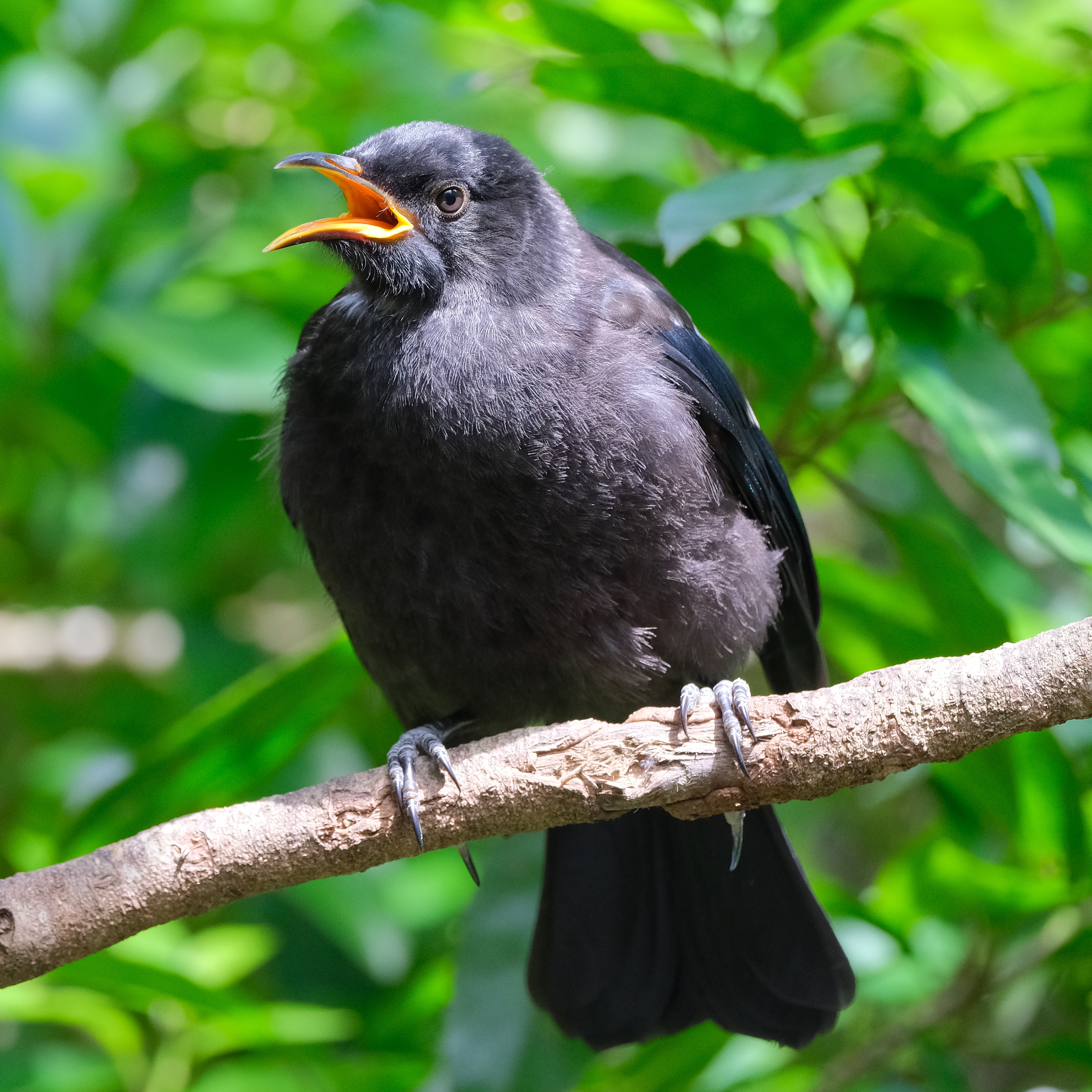
Juvenile tūī

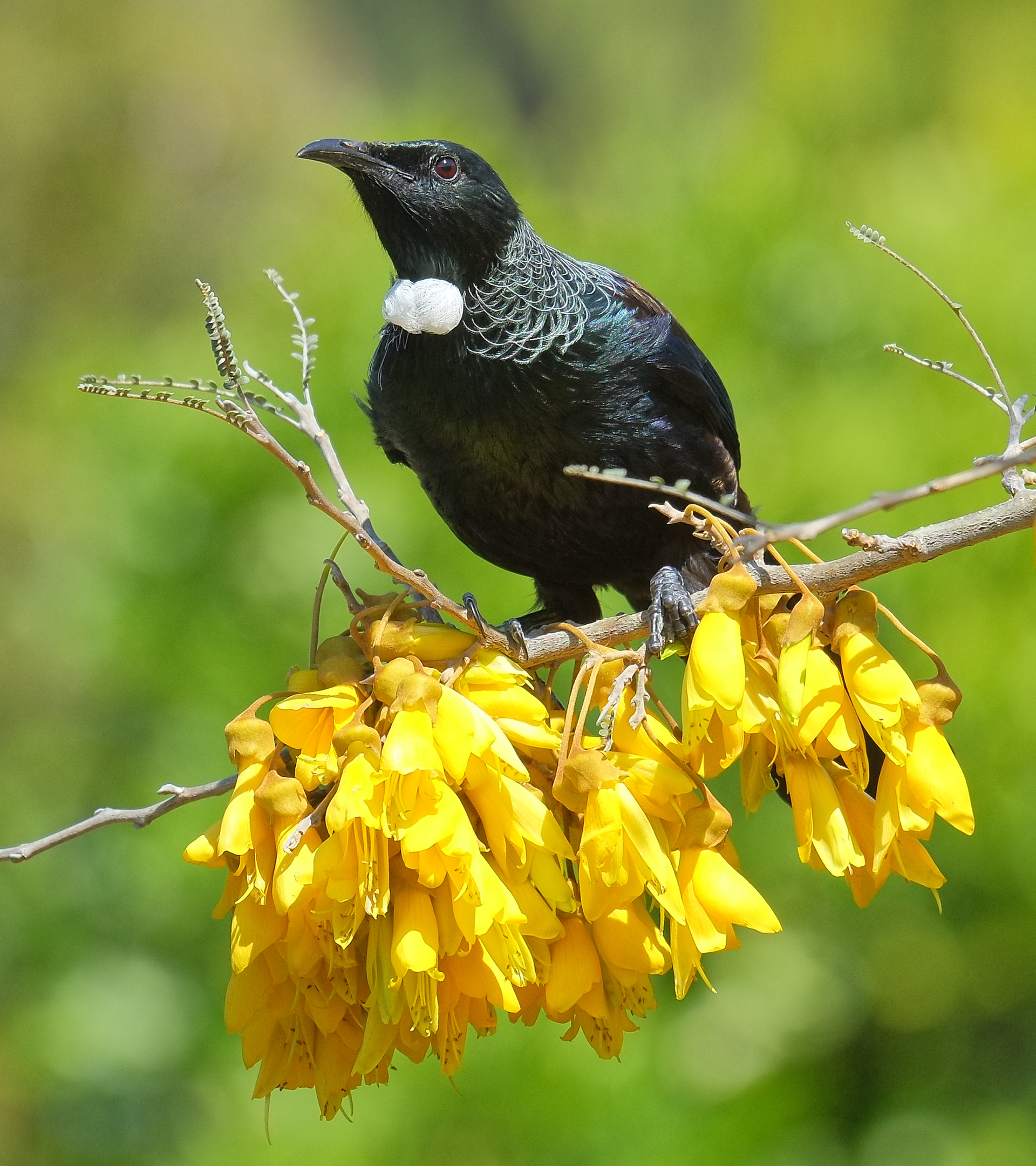
Tūī on kōwhai

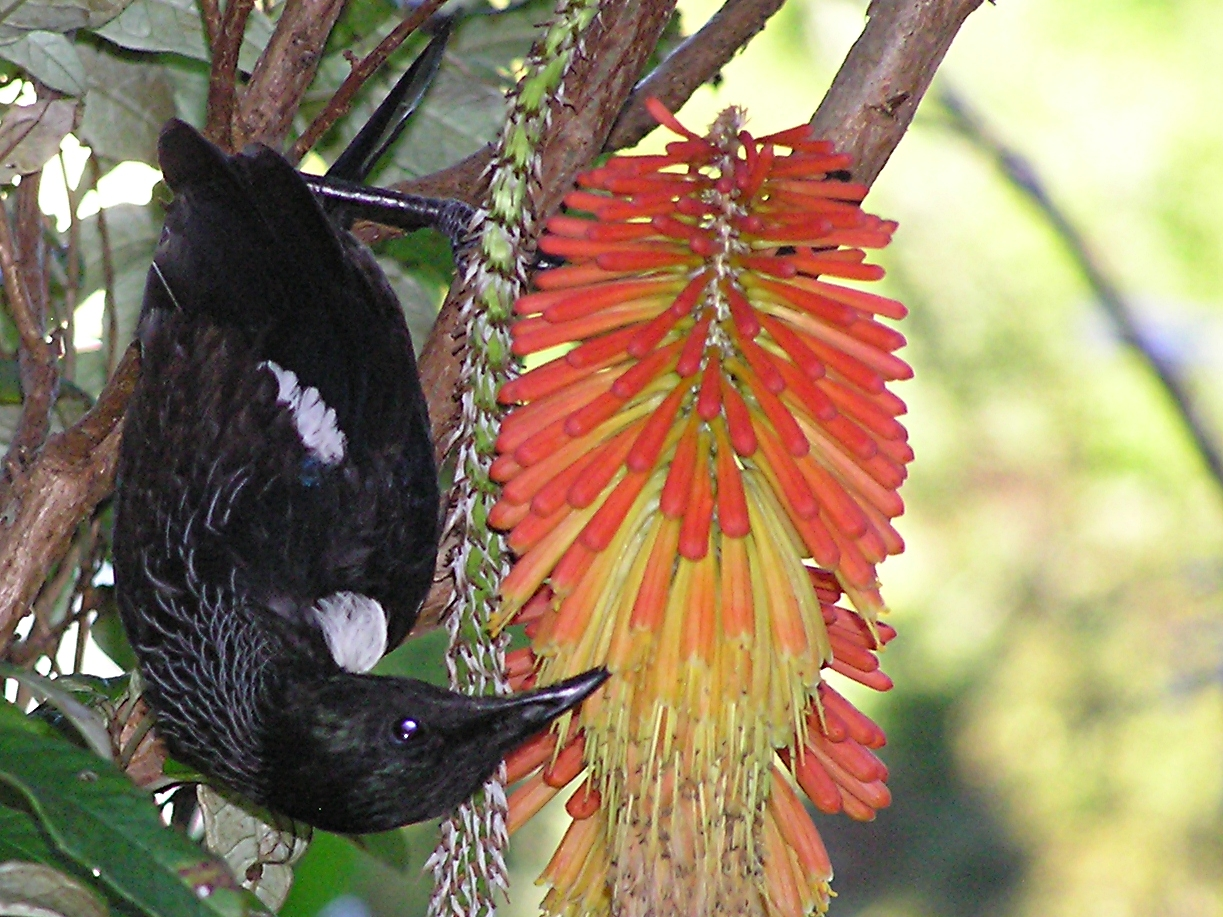
Tūī feeding on red hot poker

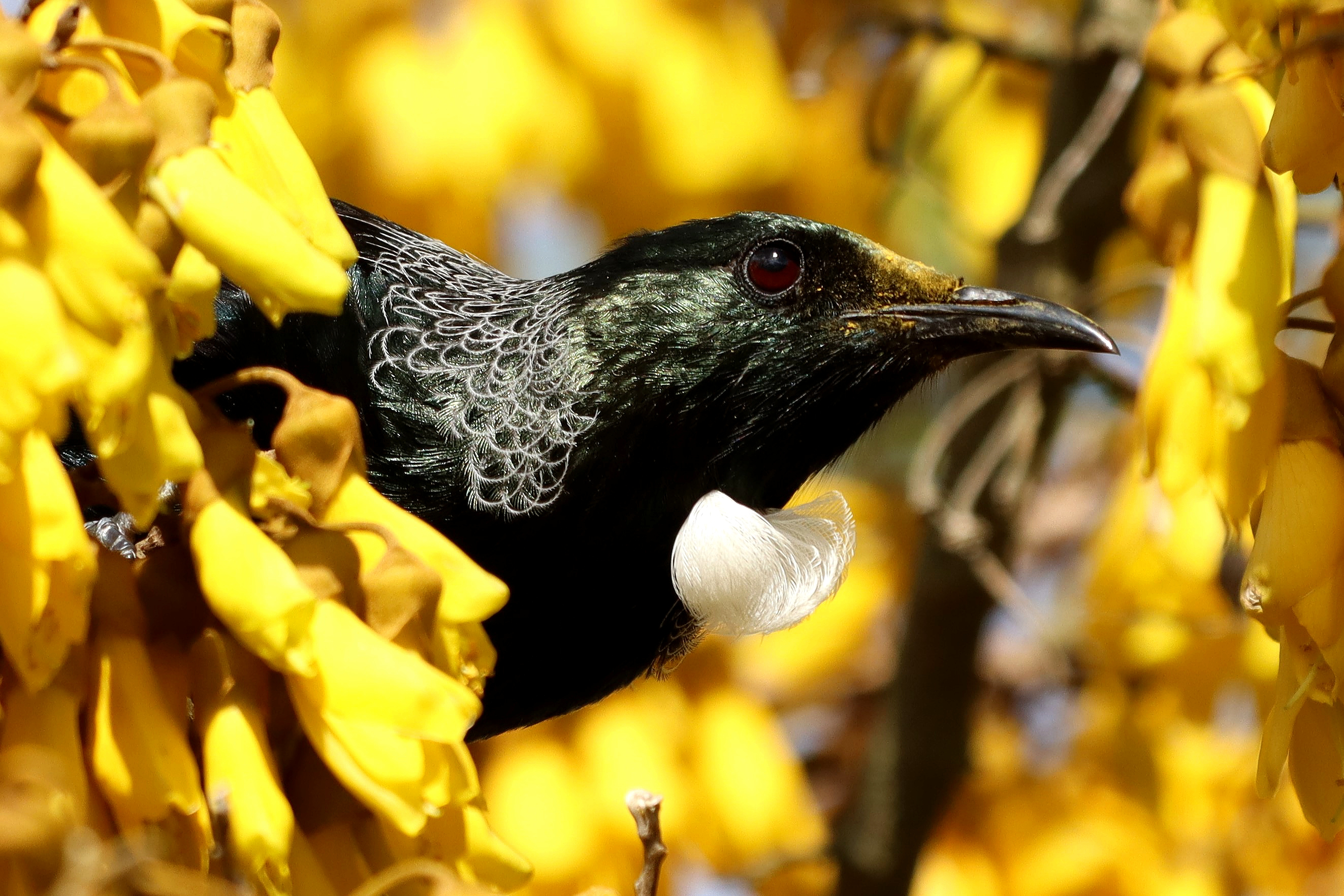
Tūī amongst kōwhai

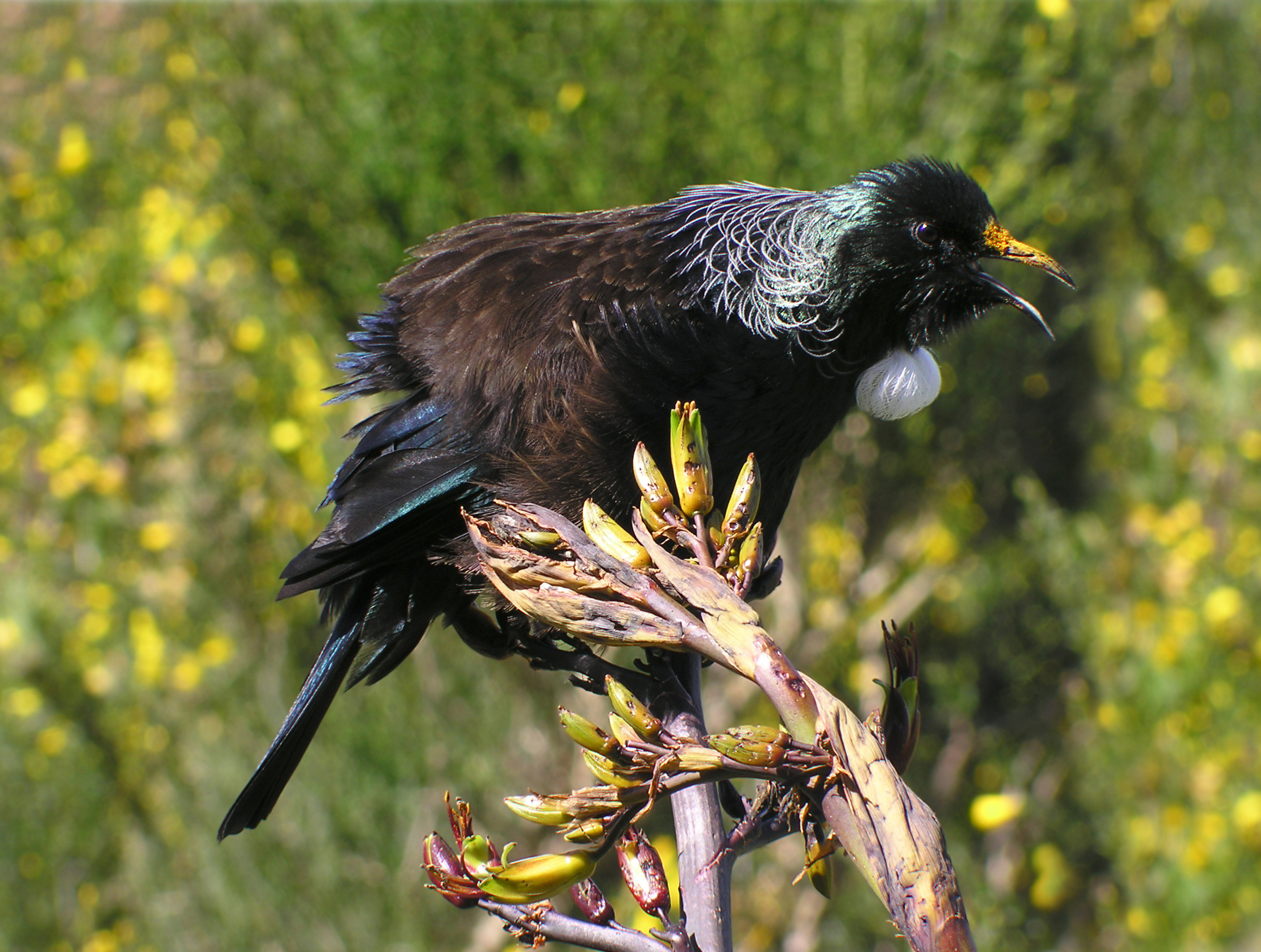
Feathers fluffed up and calling

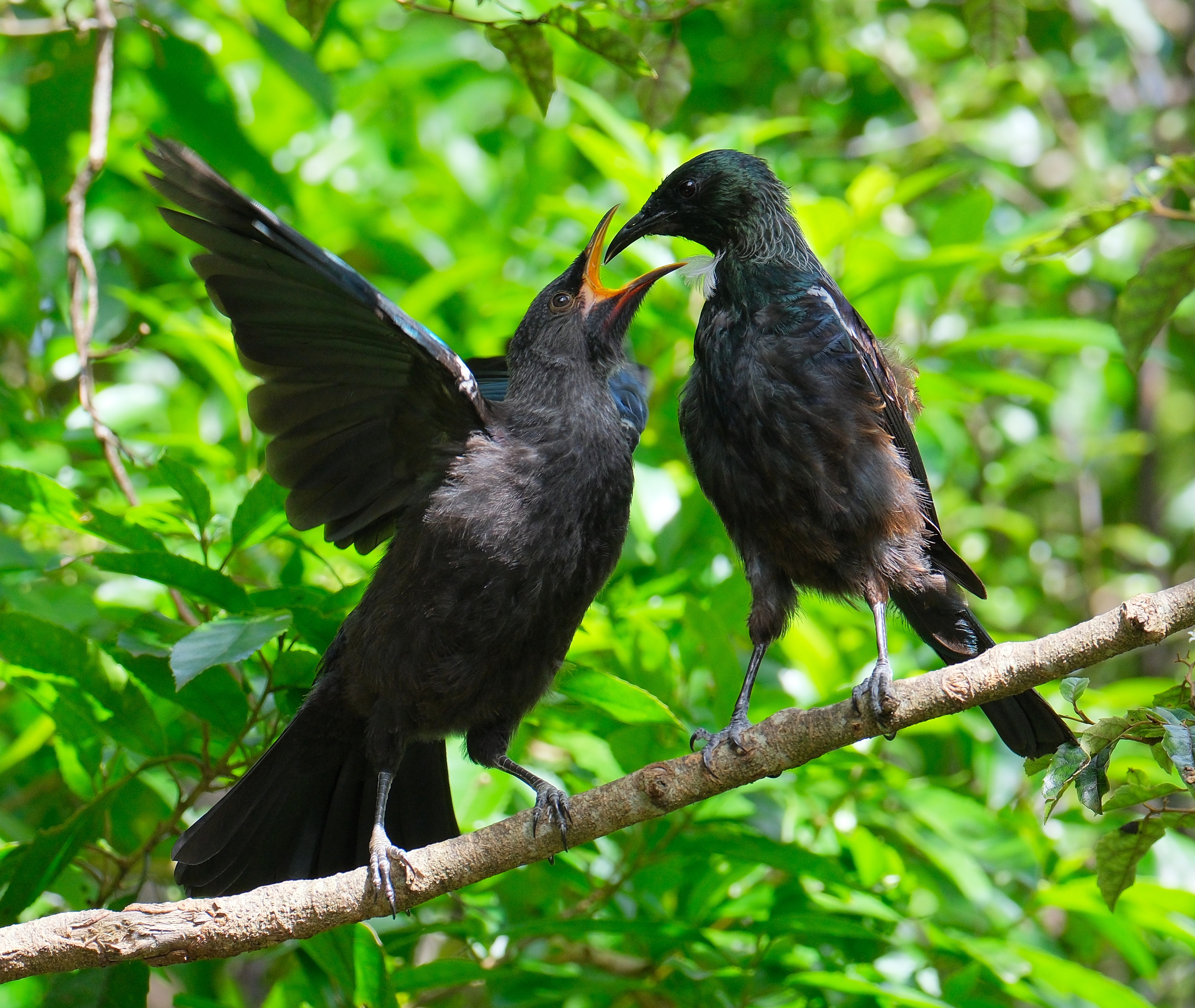
Parent feeding juvenile

Tūī defending a food source from a much larger kākā parrot

A short video of tūī vocalisations

== Sources ==
- Higgins, P.J.; Peter, J.M.; Steele, W.K., eds. (2001). "Prosthemadera novaeseelandiae Tui" (PDF). Handbook of Australian, New Zealand & Antarctic Birds. Vol. 5, Tyrant-flycatchers to chats. Melbourne, Victoria: Oxford University Press. pp. 1191–1207. ISBN 978-0-19-553258-6.
