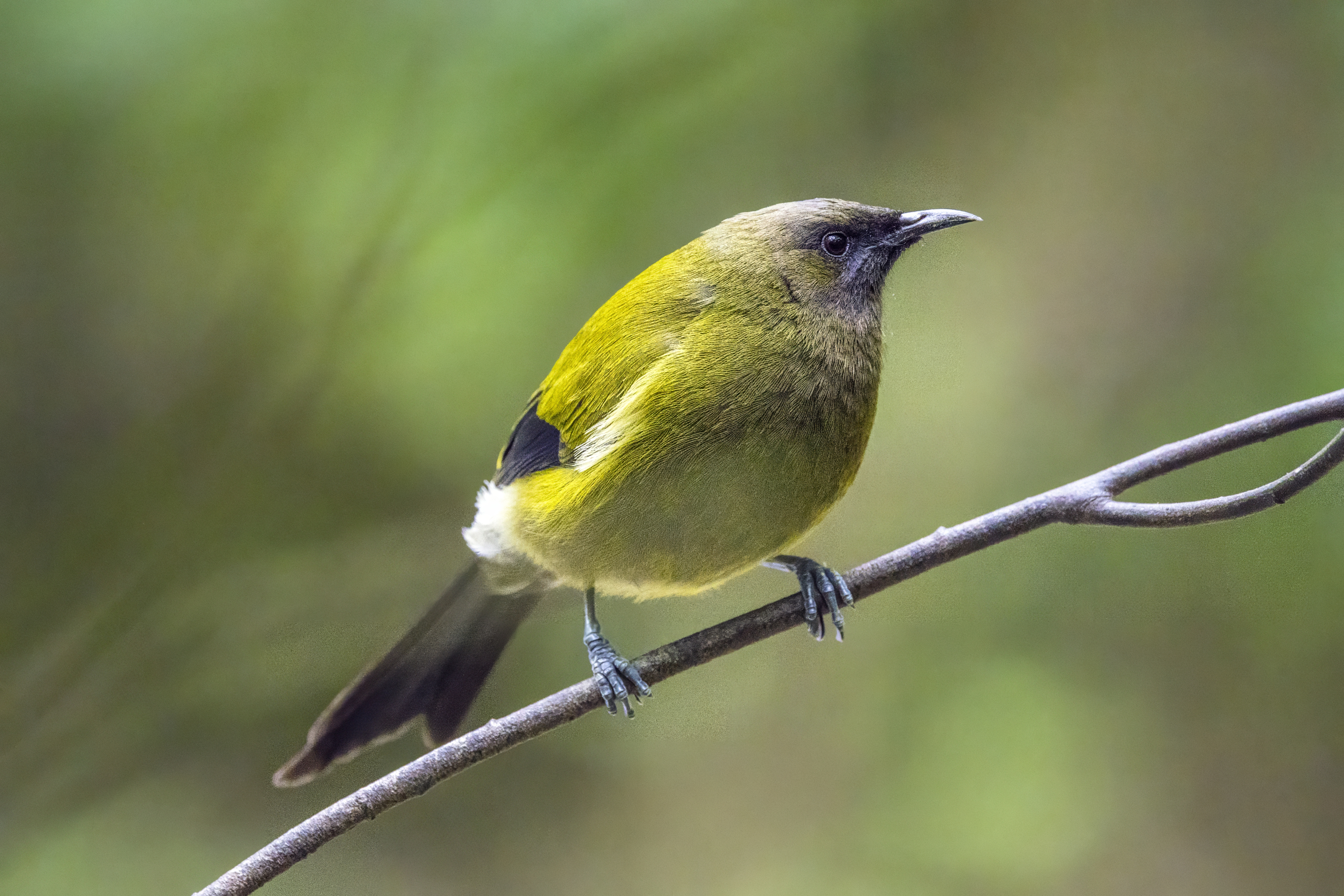
- New Zealand bellbird (male)

Conservation status
- Least Concern (IUCN 3.1)

Scientific classification
- Kingdom: Animalia
- Phylum: Chordata
- Class: Aves
- Order: Passeriformes
- Family: Meliphagidae
- Genus: Anthornis
- Species: A. melanura

Binomial name
- Anthornis melanura (Sparrman, 1786)
- Native range

Synonyms
- List: Certhia melanura Sparrman, 1786; Certhia sannio Gmelin, 1788; Philedon dumerilii Lesson & Garnot, 1828; Anthomiza caeruleocephala Swainson, 1837; Philedon sannio (Gmelin); Lesson 1838; Anthornis melanura (Sparrman); G.R. Gray 1840; Certhia olivacea J.R. Forster, 1844; Anthornis melanura Ellman, 1861; Anthornis ruficeps Von Pelzeln, 1867; Anthornis incoronata Bangs, 1911; Anthornis melanura melanura (Sparrman); Mathews & Iredale 1913; Anthornis melanura dumerilii (Lesson) [sic]; Mathews & Iredale 1913; Anthornis melanura incoronata Bangs; Mathews & Iredale 1913

= New Zealand bellbird =

Species of bird

The New Zealand bellbird (Anthornis melanura), also known by its Māori language names korimako, makomako and kōmako, is a medium-sized species of honeyeater endemic to New Zealand. It has been the only living member of the genus Anthornis since the Chatham Islands bellbird went extinct in the early 20th century. The bellbird's closest living relative is the only other New Zealand honeyeater, the tūī (Prosthemadera novaeseelandiae). The bellbird forms a significant component of the famed New Zealand dawn chorus of birdsong, which was much noted by early European settlers. Exceptional singing abilities were already observed by Captain James Cook, who described its song as "like small bells most exquisitely tuned".

Bellbirds measure about 17–20 cm (6.7–7.9 in) in length, with females weighing approximately 25 g (0.88 oz) and males 33 g (1.2 oz). Males are mostly olive-green with paler underparts, and bluish-black wings and tail. Females are paler and browner. Like other honeyeaters, the bellbird has a brush-like tongue that enables effective feeding on nectar from deep flowers. The species is common across much of New Zealand, its offshore islands, and the Auckland Islands, but it is scarce north of Waikato and across the Canterbury Plains and Central Otago. Its habitat includes both native and exotic forests and scrublands, and it is commonly found in parks and gardens.

Bellbirds feed on nectar, fruit, honeydew, and insects. During the breeding season, they become highly territorial and aggressively defend their territory against intruders. Bellbirds form monogamous pairs with long-lasting bonds that can span many years. Females typically lay around 3–4 eggs and incubate them for about 13–15 days. Fledging occurs approximately 19 days after hatching. Bellbirds have modified their ninth primary flight feathers, allowing them to produce specific whirring sounds in flight that they utilise during courtship and territorial defence. The bellbird is regarded as taonga (cultural or spiritual treasure) by the Māori, who traditionally valued it for both its meat and its melodious singing abilities.

== Taxonomy and nomenclature ==
=== History and names ===
The first Europeans to encounter New Zealand bellbirds were members of the first voyage of James Cook (1768–1771). When anchored at Queen Charlotte Sound, the voyage botanist Joseph Banks wrote in his diary on 17 January 1770 about a local dawn chorus: "Their voices were certainly the most melodious wild musick I have ever heard, almost imitating small bells but with the most tuneable silver sound imaginable". It is assumed that the chorus was created by bellbirds. Johann Reinhold Forster and Anders Sparrman collected the first specimens in April 1773 during Cook's second voyage. Forster illustrated the bellbird in Dusky Sound, however his illustration remained unpublished for many years. John Latham published a description of the bellbird in his 1782 work A General Synopsis of Birds. He mentioned that the bellbird "has an agreeable note" and that because of its ability to imitate the notes of other birds, "it was called by the English the Mocking-bird". Latham, who at that time created English names for species, and did not start applying Latin binomial names until a 1790 publication, assigned it to the Creeper genus and named the species the Mocking Creeper. The specimen he described was in the Leverian Museum in London, but has been lost, which probably happened when the Leverian collection was broken up and sold by auction in 1806.

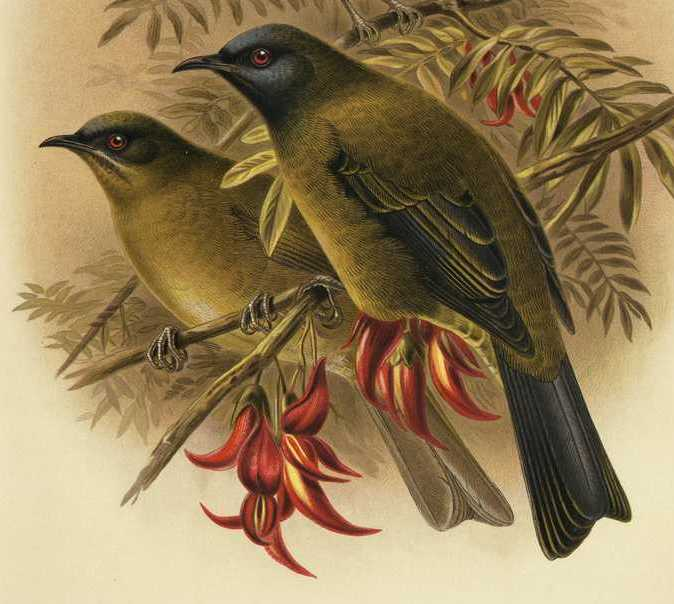
Illustration of male (right) and female bellbirds by J. G. Keulemans, 1888

Sparrman published his own description of the species in 1786 and coined the binomial name Certhia melanura. His description was based on a specimen in the private museum of Gustaf von Carlson in Sweden, which held birds that Sparrman had collected on the voyage with Cook and at the Cape of Good Hope, where he lived before and after the voyage. He erroneously wrote in the description that the specimen was from the Cape of Good Hope (in the original text he used the Cape's Latin name, Promontorium Bonae Spei). In the past, mislabelling specimens was quite common and Sparrman made exactly the same mistake with two other New Zealand birds, the rifleman and the piopio. The type locality was later corrected to Queen Charlotte Sound. Parts of Carlson's collection ended up in the Swedish Museum of Natural History and the type specimen was there as of 1857, but it was not found there in a 1926 study.

The specific name melanura means "black-tailed" (from Greek melas, "black", and oura, "tail"). In Māori, the bellbird is known by several names, including kōmako, kōparapara, korimako, makomako and kopara. The male bellbird is known as kēkerematua or kerekerematātu. The English common name "bellbird" originates from the imaginative similarity of one of its notes to the distant ringing of a bell. The subspecies epithet oneho is named after a hill (216 m) on Aorangi Island (one of the Poor Knights Islands). The hill was named after Oneho, the wife of Tatua, the last chief of the Ngatitoki hapū that inhabited the island until the 1820s. Obscurus, another subspecies epithet, comes from Latin obscurus ("dark", "dusky").

=== Classification ===
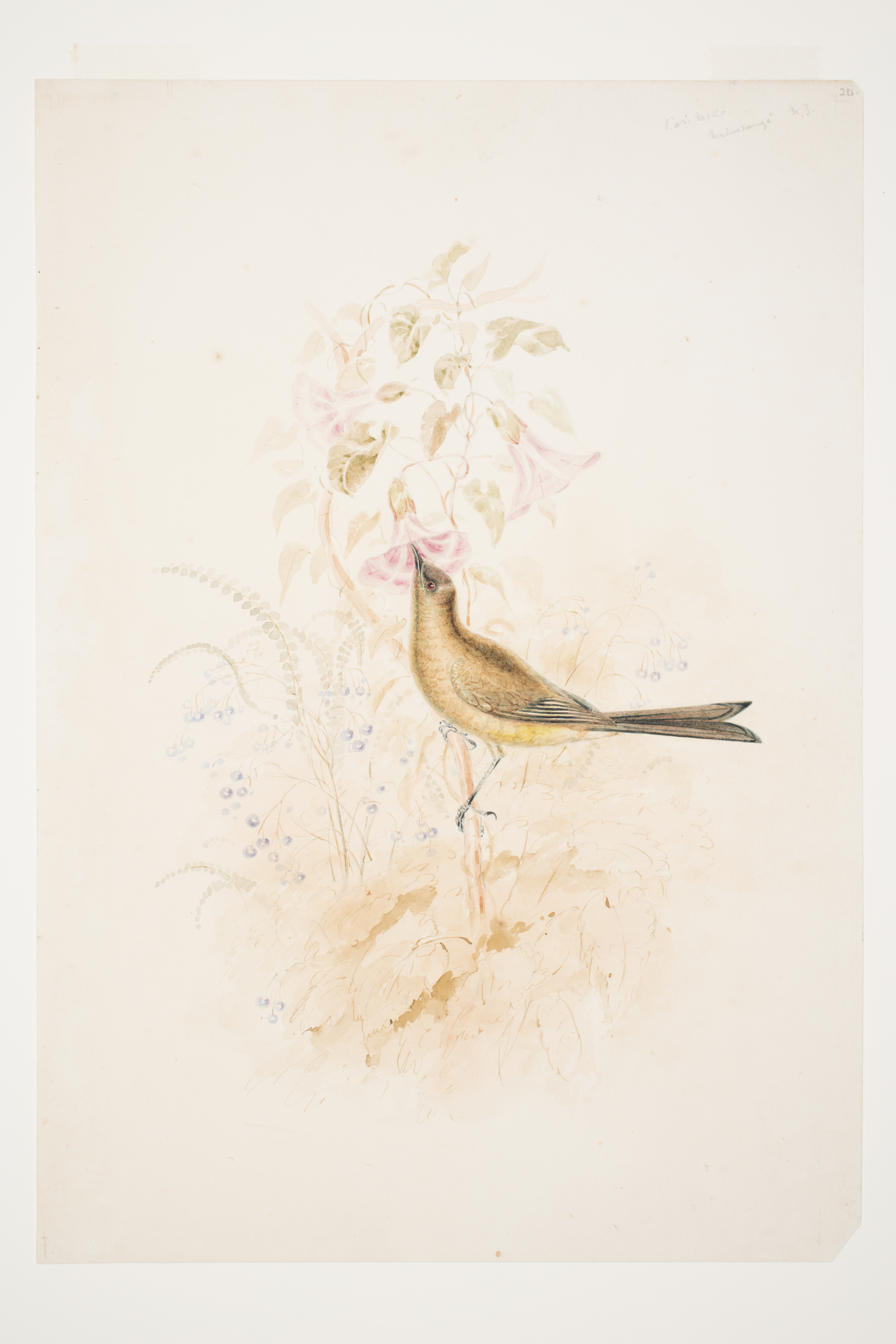
Illustration of the bellbird by Charles Heaphy, 1853

The bellbird was originally placed into the genus Certhia. In 1840, George Robert Gray established a genus Anthornis, where he moved the bellbird. The bellbird is the type species of the genus. This classification has been widely accepted since then. For a long time, the New Zealand bellbird was the sole representative of the genus Anthornis. The Chatham Islands bellbird (A. melanocephala), which became extinct in the early 20th century, was formerly classified as a subspecies of the New Zealand bellbird, as A. m. melanocephala. The Chatham Islands bellbird is now recognised as a separate species and a second member of the genus. The New Zealand bellbird and the tūī (Prosthemadera novaeseelandiae) are the only representatives of honeyeaters (Meliphagidae) in New Zealand. The hihi or stitchbird (Notiomystis cincta), another New Zealand endemic bird, was originally considered to be a honeyeater also, but it is now believed to constitute its own monotypic family, Notiomystidae.

A molecular study from 2017 identified the Chatham Islands bellbird as the closest relative to the New Zealand bellbird. Both species constitute a clade to which the tūī is a sister taxon. Other close relatives of the bellbirds and the tūī are the marbled and plain honeyeaters from New Guinea. Their phylogenetic relationships are shown in the cladogram below:

- - - plain honeyeater (Pycnopygius ixoides)
    - marbled honeyeater (Pycnopygius cinereus)
  - - - tūī (Prosthemadera novaeseelandiae)
      - - New Zealand bellbird (Anthornis melanura)
        - †Chatham Islands bellbird (Anthornis melanocephala)

=== Subspecies ===
There are three recognised subspecies of the New Zealand bellbird with the following distribution:

- A. melanura melanura (Sparrman, 1786) – occurs in North Island, South Island, Stewart Island and the Auckland Islands
- A. melanura oneho (Falla, 1948) – the Manawatāwhi / Three Kings Islands
- A. melanura obscura (Bartle & Sagar, 1987) – the Poor Knights Islands

== Description ==
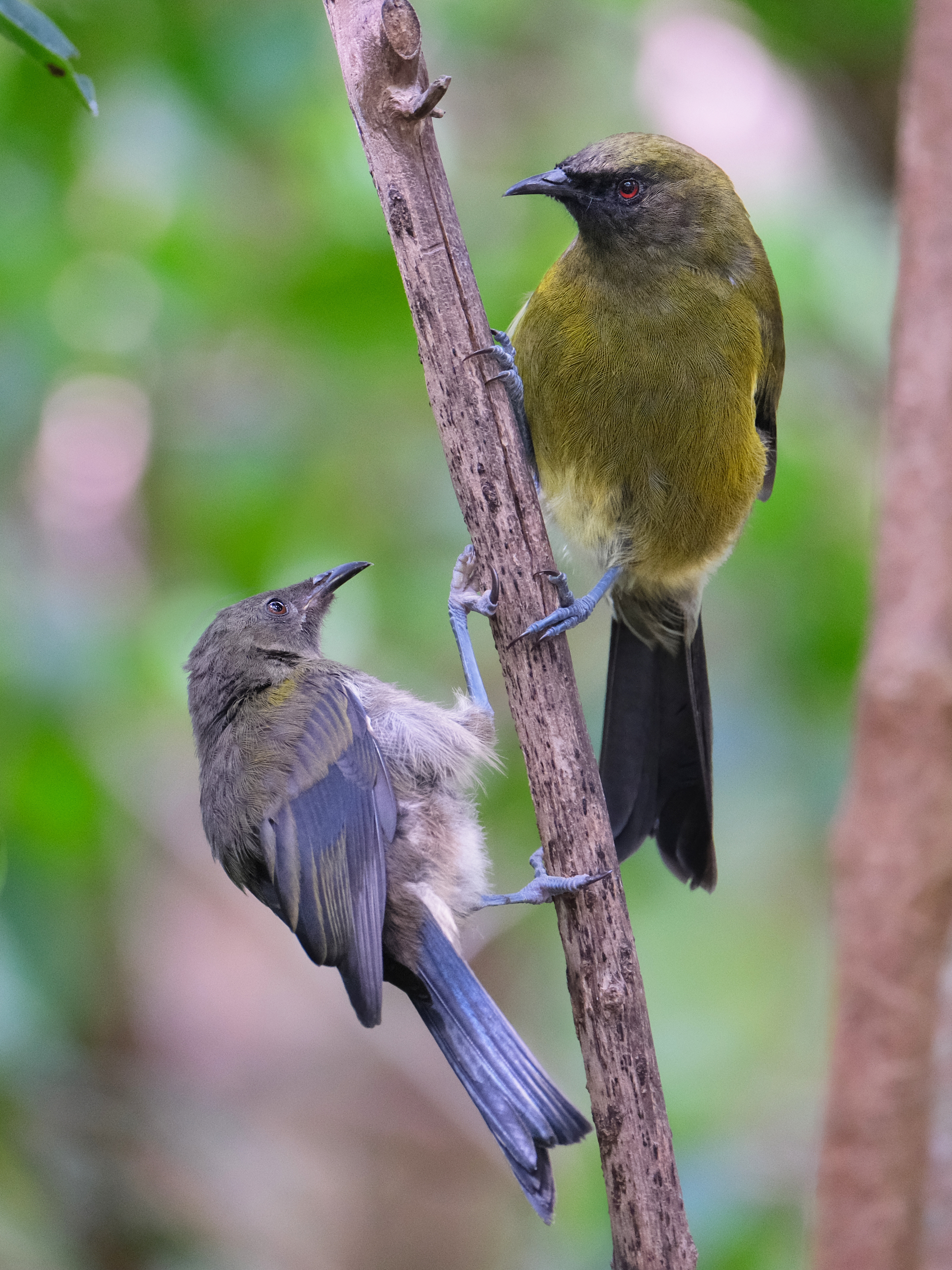
Female (left) and male (right)

Bellbirds are medium-sized honeyeaters, about 17–20 cm in length from the tip of their beak to the end of their tail. Females weigh about 25 g and males 33 g. Males have an olive-green body with a dark purplish sheen on their head. Their belly and flanks are lighter. The uppertail is black-brown with a narrow iridescent blue-black edge on most feathers. The upperwing coverts are mostly dark olive-green, with blackish inner webs. The vent and undertail-coverts are pale yellow to off-white, and the thighs are grey. The underwing is mainly grey with a dark olive leading edge, pale-yellow secondary coverts, and a brown tint to the remiges. There is a yellow patch at the bend of a folded wing. The iris of the male is red.

Females are slightly smaller than males. Their plumage is duller and much browner than adult males. The gloss on the head is bluish, and there is a narrow white stripe starting at the gape and continuing below the eye. Upperparts are dark olive-brown with dark brown uppertail and olive-edged outer webs. The upperwing is mostly dark olive-brown with dark brown inner webs and olive outer edges. Underparts are mostly olive-brown with a patch of pale yellow feathers on the flanks, less prominent than in adult males, and pale olive to off-white vent and undertail-coverts. The undertail is brownish grey, and the underwing resembles that of an adult male. The iris of a female is brown.

Bare parts of males and females are the same. The bill is black and slightly curved downwards. Legs are grey-black, claws brown. Similar to other honeyeaters, bellbirds have a brush-like tongue that is used to collect nectar deeply from flowers. The tongue is longitudinally grooved, and its tip is divided into four segments. The end of each segment is equipped with fine hair-like structures that form the final brush. In both sexes, the ninth primary feather is notched. Sometimes, the eighth or tenth or all three mentioned primaries are notched too.

Both of the subspecies oneho and obscura are very similar in appearance to the nominate subspecies described above. The male of the subspecies oneho has more blue sheen on its head, and feathers on some upper parts (nape, forehead, crown, ear coverts, chin, and throat) have a violet sheen. The female of the subspecies oneho differs from the nominate female by having a greener sheen on the head and neck, and a green-blue sheen on the crown, forehead, nape, and ear coverts. Compared to mainland birds, males of the subspecies oneho are relatively larger in proportion to females. The male of the subspecies obscura has slightly darker plumage than the nominate male, and its sheen on the upper body parts is violet. The female of the subspecies obscura has slightly paler underparts compared to the nominate female.

A juvenile male is similar to an adult male but is duller with very little to no iridescence. A juvenile female is even paler and greyer than a juvenile male. Unlike adults, juvenile bellbirds do not have their primaries notched. Nestlings are initially born without feathers, but quickly develop a covering of grey down.

== Distribution and habitat ==
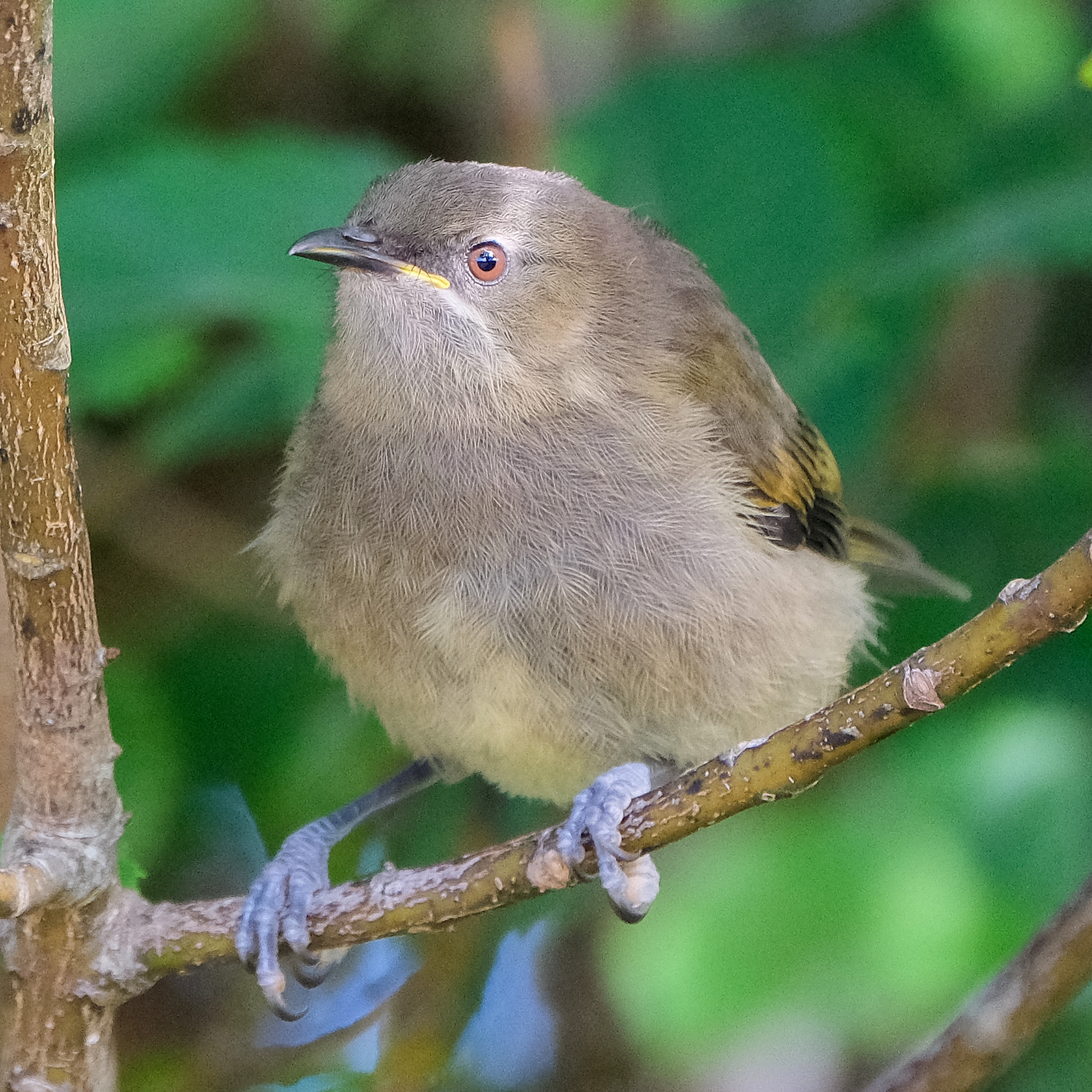
Juvenile bellbird perched on a twig

The most widespread subspecies by far is melanura, which can be found throughout North, South and Stewart Island and the Auckland Islands. It is also present on many satellites, like Tiritiri Matangi, Little Barrier, Cuvier and Mayor Island, and the Mokohinau, Mercury, Hen and Chickens and Aldermen Islands. Vagrants have appeared as far south as Campbell Island and there is a historical record from the Snares Islands dating back to 1888. Subspecies oneho only occurs on the Three Kings Islands, and subspecies obscura only nests on the Poor Knights Islands, but occasionally visits the nearby mainland of eastern Northland. Bellbirds are almost absent north of Waikato. Northland can get occasional winter female visitors from nearby offshore islands, and small pocket populations exist in some places north of Auckland, like Tāwharanui Peninsula and Shakespear Regional Park. It is also scarce in the Canterbury Plains and Central Otago. In their native forest habitat, bellbirds can be abundant and are more widely distributed than tūī.

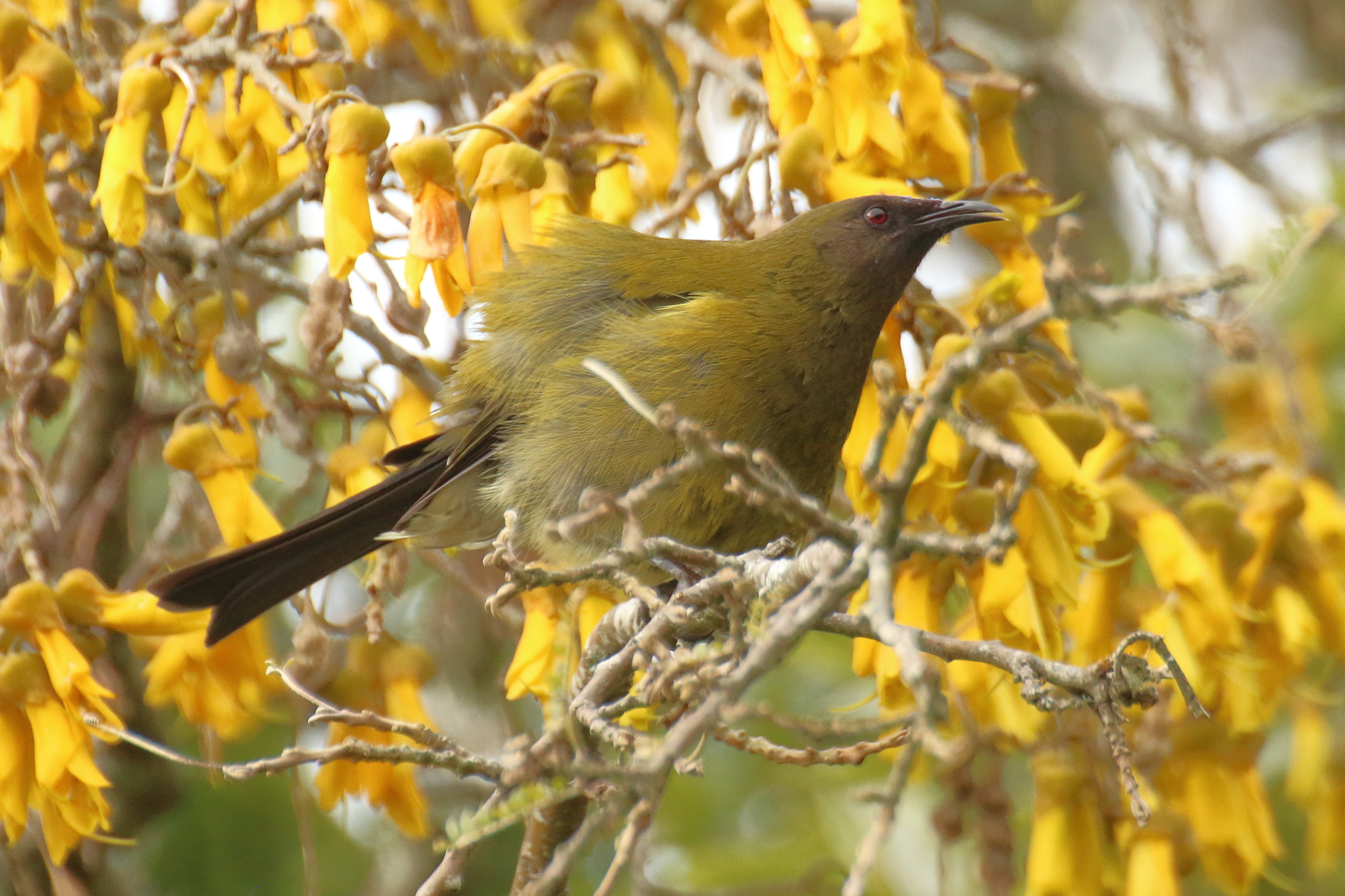
Male bellbird on a kōwhai tree, Banks Peninsula

The bellbird's habitat encompasses both native and exotic forests and scrublands, and it is frequently found in urban areas such as parks and gardens, especially if there is a nearby patch of native bush. It is found from lowland areas at sea level up to about 1200 metres, including subalpine regions above the tree line. It particularly thrives in densely vegetated areas with a mix of podocarp-hardwood lowland forests with diverse vegetation. It is typically found in forests dominated by northern rātā (Metrosideros robusta), tawheowheo (Quintinia serrata), kāmahi (Weinmannia racemosa), as well as mixed southern beech forests (Nothofagus species) or coastal broadleaf forests, such as pōhutukawa (Metrosideros excelsa). Additionally, it can be found in exotic forests such as eucalyptus, acacia, and even pine and willow forests. Occasionally, it ventures into farmland, including orchards.

On predator-free islands, bellbirds typically reach higher population densities than on the mainland. On the Poor Knights Islands, subspecies oneho reaches densities of 71 birds per hectare. However, this figure was derived from a study area of only 0.45 hectares, and therefore may not accurately reflect the entire 66-hectare island. On the predator-free Great Island in the Three Kings Islands, the density of bellbirds was estimated to be 16 birds per hectare and on Tiritiri Matangi Island 2.13 pairs per hectare.

== Behaviour and ecology ==
During the breeding season, bellbirds mostly remain within their territories but may leave to feed at nearby food sources. Outside of this period, they are solitary and nomadic. The bellbird's flight is noisy and direct. While some populations are residential, some may migrate locally. Seasonal migrations were recorded between bush in the winter and summer coastal forest, or between river beds and urban areas. They are also capable of moving between offshore islands and the mainland. Bellbirds from Tawharanui are believed to have flown from Little Barrier Island, which is 23 km away across the open sea.

Main natural predators of bellbirds are the swamp harrier (Circus approximans) and the New Zealand falcon (Falco novaeseelandiae). In the Auckland Islands, bellbirds were the most commonly eaten prey of falcons. Bellbirds can also be attacked by Australian magpie (Gymnorhina tibicen).

=== Breeding ===
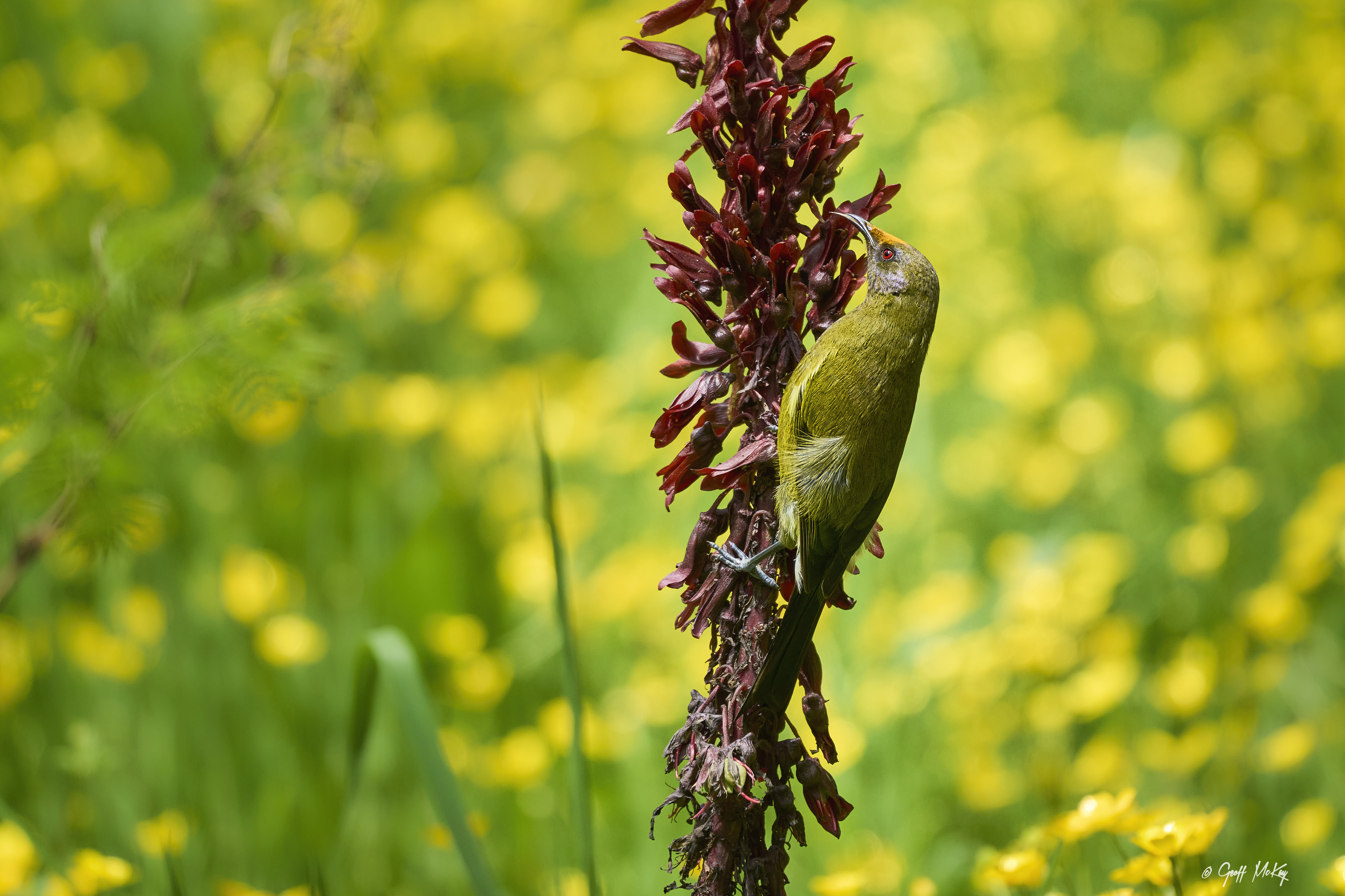
Bellbird (male) feeding on honey bush, an exotic plant. The pollen on its forehead will help pollinate other flowers.

Bellbirds are monogamous and establish long-term bonds. They keep the same territory each year. On Poor Knight Islands, adult males were defending their territories year-round. During the breeding season, a female shared a male's territory and helped defend it by chasing away other bellbirds. After breeding, she became non-territorial and, especially in autumn, joined flocks of juveniles and immature birds. During breeding, bellbirds vigorously defend their territories, with females willing to physically attack intruders. Sometimes, females attempt to distract approaching predators by falling to the ground and flapping away through dense undergrowth.

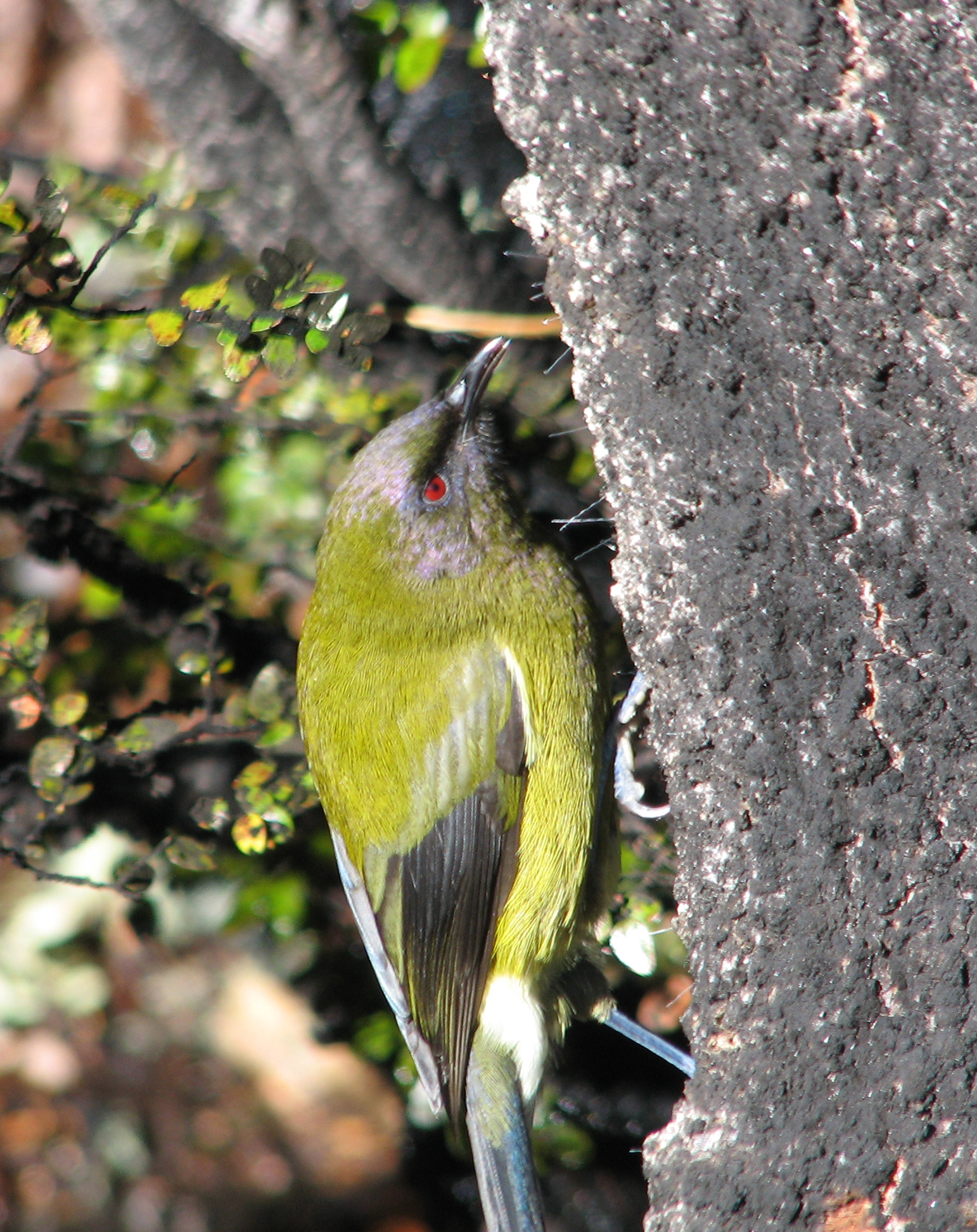
Bellbird (male) feeding on honeydew on the trunk of a mountain beech tree, Craigieburn Forest

Courtship occurs in August and September, during which a pair of bellbirds can be seen chasing each other or singing together. Male courtship behaviour includes hovering or slowly ascending with his body in a vertical position, producing a whirring sound with his wings. Courtship feeding sometimes occurs, during which the male feeds the female. Courtship behaviour intensifies as they get closer to nest building. The female constructs a cup-shaped nest from twigs, moss and fibres, lining it with fine grasses, wool and feathers. While the nest is usually situated in a tree, on some islands it may be located in a rock or trunk cavity. On a tree, it could be placed from ground level to about 15 m high. On Tiritiri Matangi, most nests were placed under the hanging fronds of tree ferns. Nest building takes about 3–7 days.

Mainland bellbirds generally lay eggs between September and January, typically raising two broods. In contrast, bellbirds from the Poor Knights Islands lay eggs from late September to late November and usually have only one brood. Females lay 3–4 eggs at daily intervals. The eggs measure approximately 23×16 mm and are pinkish with red-brown spots. Only females incubate the eggs, while males defend the territory. Incubation lasts approximately 13–15 days, starting with the last egg laid. Occasionally, the male may feed the incubating female, but she also leaves the nest to forage independently.

Usually both parents feed the chicks, though sometimes only females feed the chicks or do the majority of feeding. The female broods the chicks for about 5–6 days, spending all night and about half of the day doing so; after this period, she only broods at night. Chicks fledge after around 19 days. They stay close to the nest in dense vegetation, where their parents continue to feed them. After about 3 days, the young birds begin to forage on their own, becoming fully independent in approximately another week or two. On Tiritiri Matangi, nest success was 44 %, primarily hindered by predation and nest abandonment, contributing to the relatively low reproductive success. Bellbirds can begin breeding in their first year and can live at least eight years.

=== Diet ===
Bellbirds consume nectar, fruit, honeydew, and insects. For most of the year, they feed on nectar from a large variety of native and, more recently, exotic plant species. However, in autumn, when nectar and honeydew are scarce, they eat more fruit. Females tend to consume more insects than males, likely because the more aggressive males exclude them from feeding territories. Fruit is typically consumed whole, with diameters mostly below 6 mm and occasionally up to 10 mm.

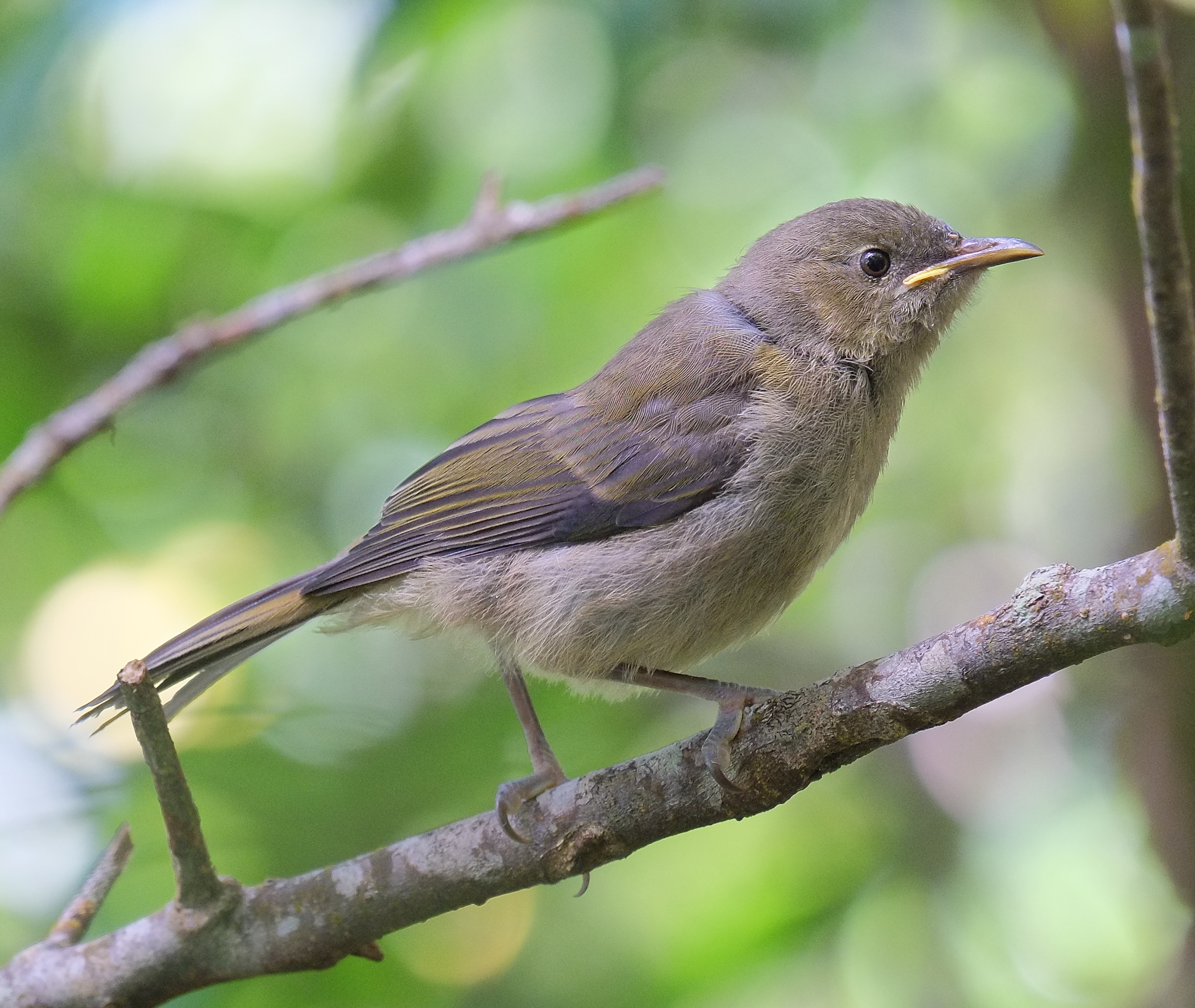
Juvenile bellbird standing on a branch (Zealandia, Wellington)

Nectar is taken from a variety of local plants, such as New Zealand fuchsia (Fuchsia excorticata), kōwhai (Sophora species), five-finger (Neopanax arboreus), flax (Phormium species), southern rātā (Metrosideros umbellata), mahoe (Melicytus ramiflorus), horopito (Pseudowintera species), kanuka (Kunzea ericoides), pate (Schefflera digitata), red matipo (Myrsine australis), supplejack (Ripogonum scandens), broadleaf (Griselinia littoralis), cabbage tree (Cordyline australis), ribbonwood (Plagianthus regius) and many others. Similar to nectar, fruit can be obtained from numerous species of trees and shrubs, such as karamū (Coprosma lucida, C. robusta), makomako (Aristotelia serrata), rimu (Dacrydium cupressinum), kahikatea (Dacrycarpus dacrydioides), flax, red matipo or rōhutu (Neomyrtus pedunculata). Favourite insects taken include flies (Diptera), true bugs (Hemiptera), and true cicadas (Cicadidae). Young birds primarily feed on insects such as caterpillars, moths, larvae, and spiders.

Bellbirds can gather food from all levels of the forest. They may also forage in flocks with other bird species, such as the whitehead (Mohoua albicilla). They obtain insects by gleaning them from all parts of a tree or by hawking. During the breeding season, they are territorial and forage alone. After breeding, they are typically solitary, even though multiple individuals may forage in the same tree simultaneously; each defends its own foraging territory within the tree. Bellbirds play an important part in pollinating numerous native plants such as mistletoe (e.g. Peraxilla tetrapetala), fuchsia, and kōwhai. They are also important seed dispersers.

=== Song and sound ===
Bellbirds singing
Several New Zealand bellbirds singing on Tiritiri Matangi Island

The New Zealand bellbirds have a distinctive vocal repertoire. Its pronounced singing voice was noted already by James Cook who thought that "it seemed to be like small bells most exquisitely tuned". Bellbird song varies regionally and is somewhat similar to the song of the tūī but it does not include harsh grunts, clicks and wheezes. Bellbirds utilise their song throughout the year to defend breeding territories and food resources. Bellbirds sing throughout the day but are especially active in the early morning and evening. The male's song features three distinct sounds reminiscent of chiming bells. The dawn song typically includes 2 to 6 pure, bell-like notes, sometimes interspersed with quieter tones, and can last between 10 and 40 minutes, particularly at dawn and during the breeding season. While singing, the male stretches his neck and fluffs his feathers. Singing males often join in unison. Their full song includes a variety of sounds, such as clonks, chonks, quiet notes, and harsh noises. The female sings with quite pure frequency, producing songs of 7 to 15 notes. She can engage in countersinging with other females or perform duets with her mate.

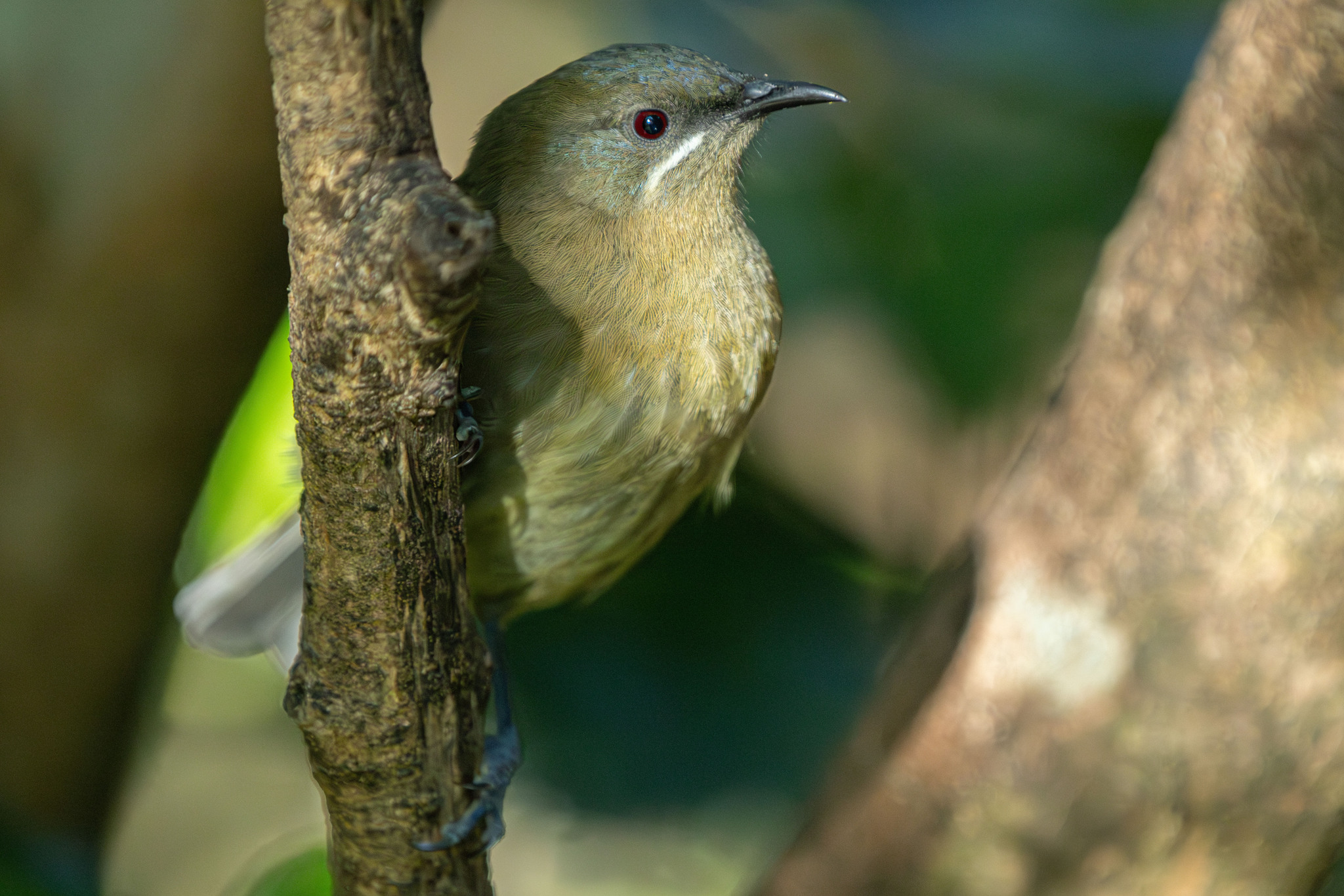
Female bellbird (Tiritiri Matangi)

Song types differ significantly between the sexes, with males singing several structurally distinct types of songs, while females produce overlapping types in structure. Joint singing at dawn, as noted by Sir Joseph Banks in Queen Charlotte Sound during James Cook's first voyage to New Zealand, occurs primarily at dawn and dusk in areas with a high density of bellbirds and few other bird species. This phenomenon is only heard when many bellbirds are present at the same time. Their alarm call is a rapidly repeated set of harsh staccato "yeng".

The modification of the ninth, sometimes also eight or tenth primaries allow bellbirds to make a specific whirring sound during flight. The wing sound frequencies can vary, usually staying below 1000 hertz. Bellbirds can control the production of these sounds and tūī, a major food competitor, can also make them. The wing whirling sounds are connected to the expression of aggression on feeding territories, territory defence but also courtship displays.

== Conservation ==
=== Historical decline ===
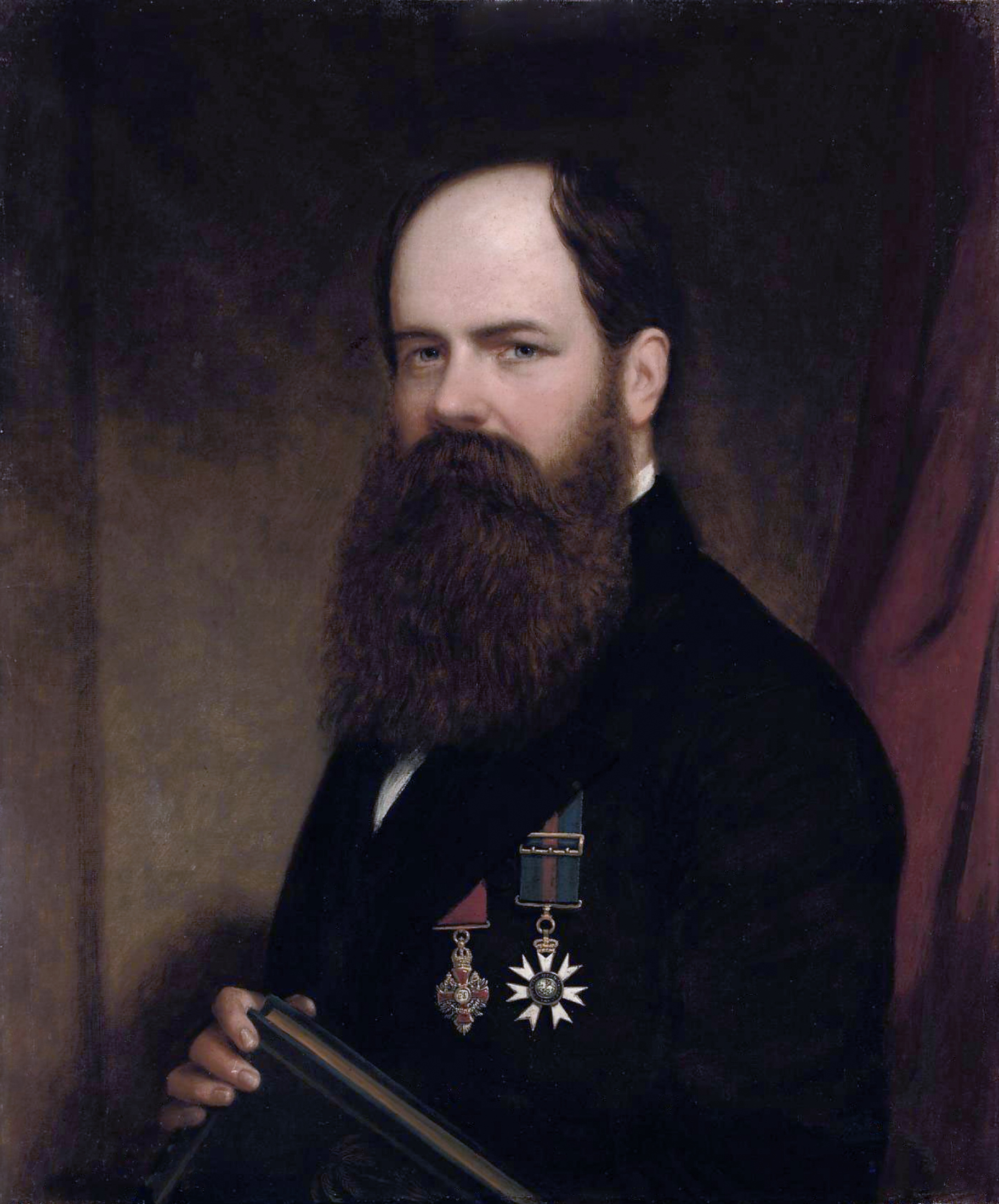
Walter Lawry Buller was one of the first ornithologists to mention a steep decline in bellbird numbers in the 1860s.

Bellbirds were once widespread across New Zealand in high numbers. At the time of European arrival, they were one of the most common birds. Bellbird populations have declined significantly due to the destruction of native forests (initiated by Māori and perpetuated by Europeans) and the introduction of invasive predators such as cats (Felis catus), mustelids including ferrets (Mustela furo), stoats (M. erminea) and weasels (M. nivalis), and rodents such as the brown rat (Rattus norvegicus) and the black rat (Rattus rattus). Between the 1860s and about 1900, bellbird numbers declined very dramatically, prompting many ornithologists to search for reasons beyond deforestation and introduced mammals. Walter Buller, the prominent New Zealand ornithologist of the 19th century, in 1871 quoted Hokianga resident Frederick Maning saying:

I remember the time, not very long ago, when the Maori lads would come out of the woods with hundreds of korimakos hung around them in strings, now one scarcely ever hears the bird; formerly they swarmed in the northern woods by thousands, now they are well nigh extinct.

The decline started in the north of the country and moved south. By 1870, bellbirds had vanished from Northland, and between 1868 and 1878 they disappeared from Great Barrier Island. In the South Island, bellbird numbers in Canterbury did not reach their lowest point until 1900. While bellbirds declined across New Zealand's main islands, the impact was most pronounced in the North Island. After 1910, bellbird numbers in Canterbury started to surge. A comparable recovery, albeit earlier, occurred in many North Island areas, apart from northern areas such as Northland.

J. G. Myers suggested that the decline could have been caused by a disease such as avian malaria, which was introduced from Europe in birds of some non-native species. This hypothesis is supported by the fact that offshore island populations were not as affected (the Great Barrier, with its highly modified habitat, is an exception), and bellbirds have survived in some mainland habitats with the same pressure of introduced mammals until the present day. However, further evidence supporting a sudden spread of disease is lacking, and widespread sudden decrease in other taxa suggest a wider ecological problem.

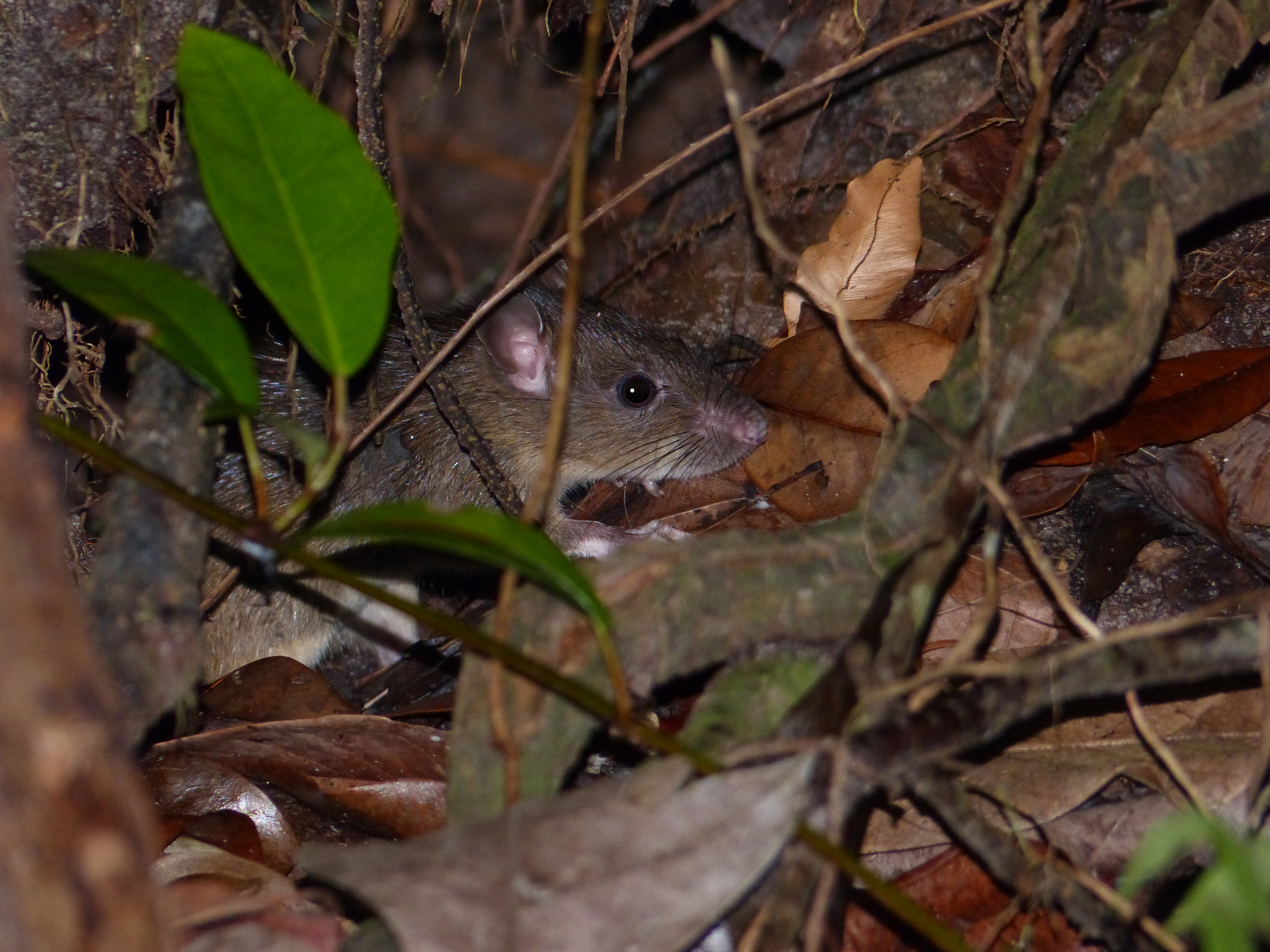
The tree-climbing black rat is a frequent predator of bellbirds.

The main cause of this sharp decline remains unclear. Andreas Reischek considered the decline to be caused by "cats, rats, bees and bush-fires." Buller mentioned that some Māori from Northland believed that the decline was caused by an introduced honey bee that drove away the bellbirds from their flowers. Buller originally believed that the decline was caused by introduced rats. However, in 1894 he cast doubts on this hypothesis after visiting Motutaiko Island in Lake Taupō, infamous for its rat infestation, yet discovered a thriving bellbird population there. Later authors suggested that rats still may have caused the decline of the bellbirds and that the rats Buller saw on Motutaiko Island were actually either brown rats or Polynesian rats, which do not climb trees frequently, and the sharp decline was caused by tree-climbing black rats.

Black rats were introduced in northern New Zealand in the mid-19th century, and their rapid spread south indeed coincided with the decline of bellbirds (and some other passerines, such as South Island saddleback (Philesturnus carunculatus), parakeets (Cyanoramphus species) and bush wren (Xenicus longipes)). Black rats are believed to be the primary reason for the extinction of the Chatham Island bellbird, which is another reason to suspect that they also played a significant role in the population decline of New Zealand bellbirds. Some other research also points to black rats or introduced mammalian predators in general.

=== Reintroductions ===
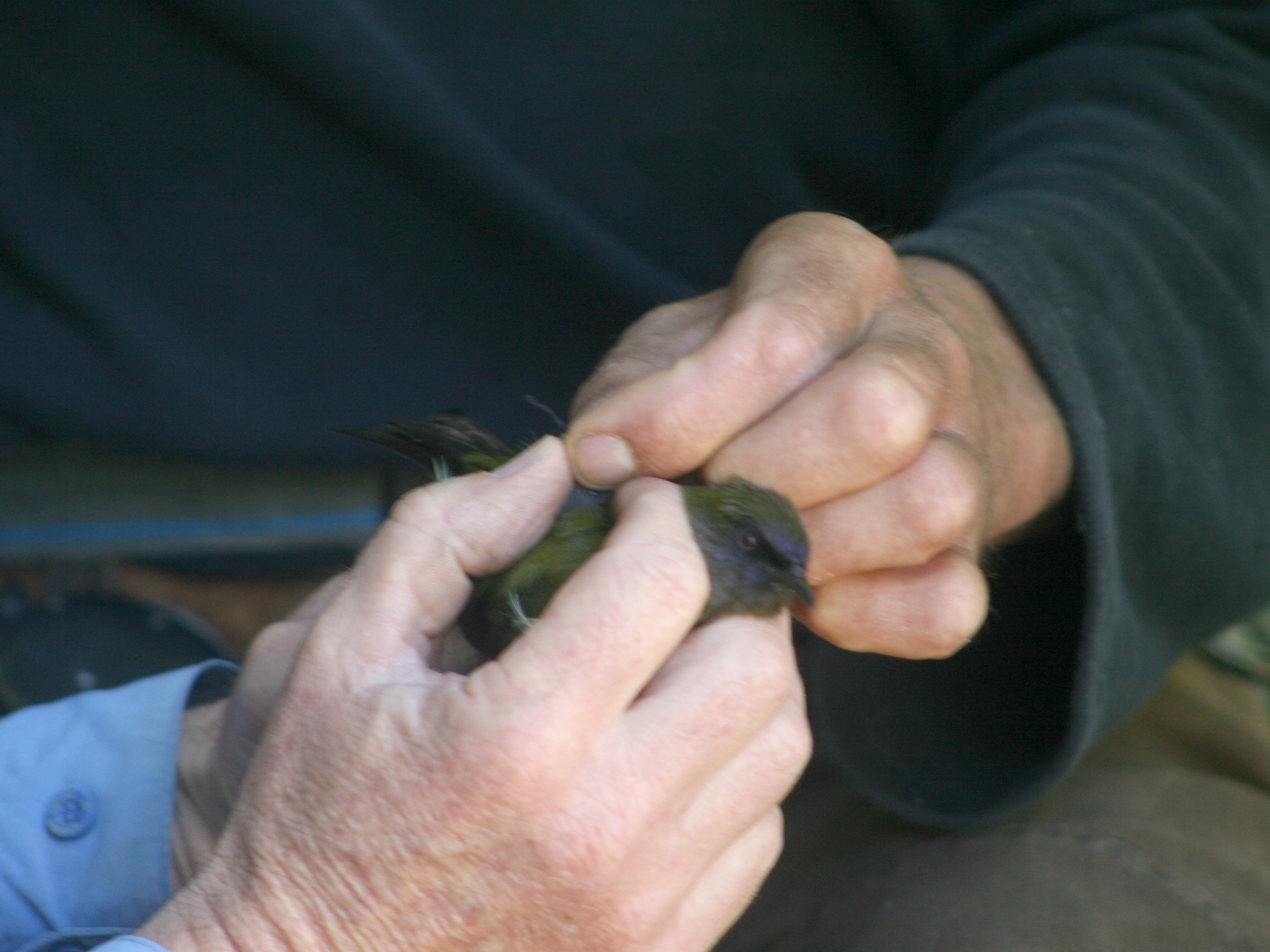
Attaching tracking transmitter and antenna to a bellbird, Zealandia wildlife sanctuary, Wellington

There have been many attempts to reintroduce bellbirds to areas of their former abundance. The first reintroduction occurred in 1932 when Auckland Zoological Society released 15 bellbirds from Little Barrier Island in the Waitākere Ranges. The bellbirds initially dispersed a few kilometres into the valley but gradually disappeared with no reports after 1946. During the second mainland release in March 1983 at Shakespear Regional Park, 22 birds were set free. Only one nest was reported, and soon after, bellbirds disappeared, with some observed returning to their home island of Tiritiri Matangi. Similar outcomes were seen in a few other release attempts, where bellbirds vanished shortly after being released. As of 2012, a few more reintroductions were in progress. The cause of failures of reintroductions of bellbirds is often difficult to determine, but predation by mammalian predators, mainly black rats, is thought to be a critical factor. There is a potential possibility to translocate bellbirds to Chatham Islands in order to replace the ecological niche of their extinct relative, the Chatham bellbird.

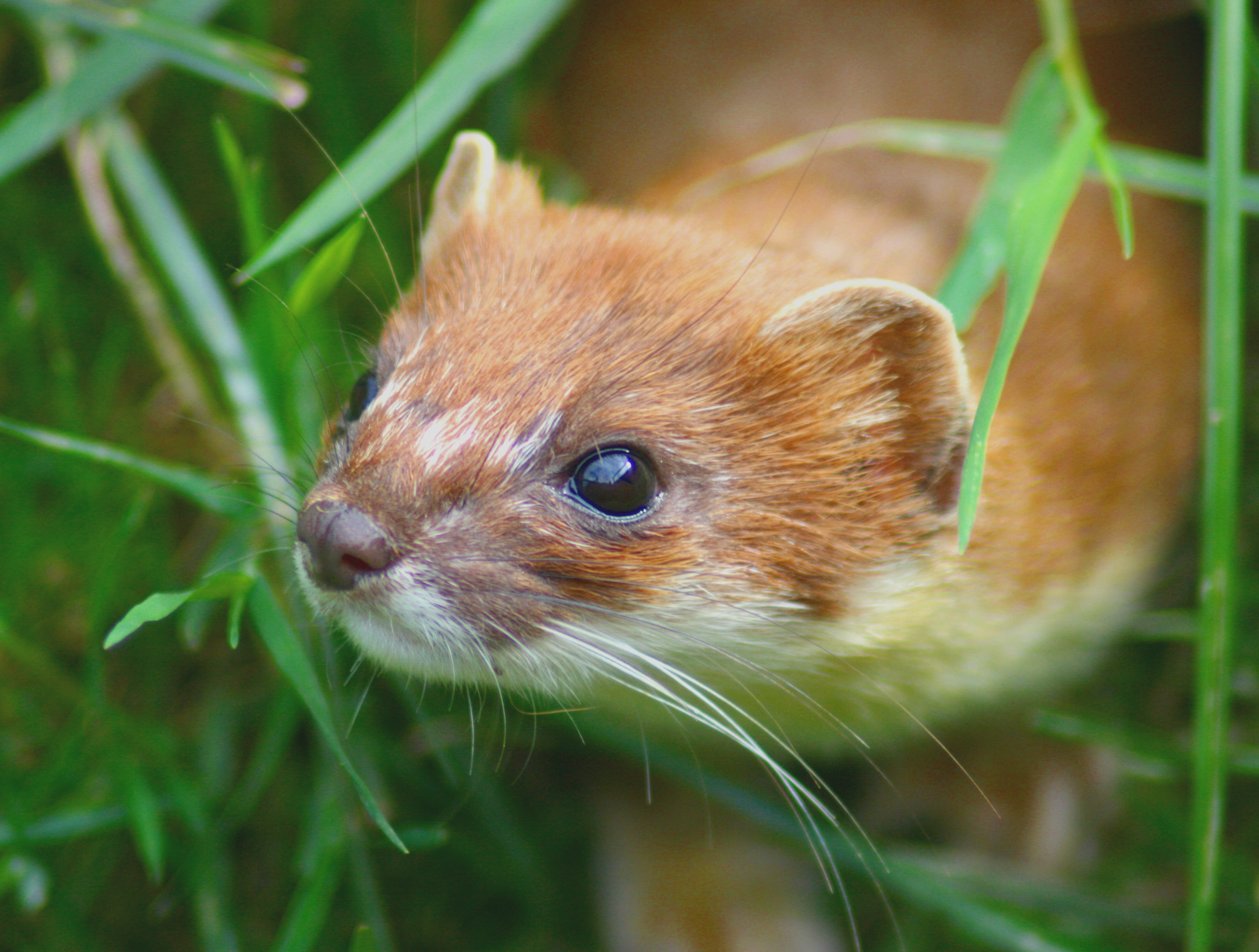
The stoat, a predator of bellbirds

=== Threats and population assessment ===
Despite the bellbirds' widespread presence on the New Zealand mainland, their populations remain low due to the impact of mammalian predators like rats and stoats. Invasive mammalian predators are the main threats to bellbirds. In beech forest the main predator is the stoat, while in non-beech forest areas the main predator is likely the black rat. In areas of the mainland where bellbirds are found, their numbers are typically lower compared to predator-free islands. Although possums have not been shown to directly kill bellbirds, they compete with them for food resources. Introduced social wasps like German wasps (Vespula germanica), and particularly common wasps (V. vulgaris), have been found to significantly diminish the availability of honeydew drops, which are an important food source for bellbirds.

The International Union for Conservation of Nature (IUCN) classifies bellbirds as a species of least concern. New Zealand Department of Conservation considers the subspecies melanura as "not-threatened", while the island subspecies obscura and oneho are "naturally uncommon". According to IUCN and a 2010 study, the overall bellbird population is suspected to be in decline as a result of ongoing habitat destruction and predation by introduced mammals. The decline is most prominent in lowland areas under 1000 metres in elevation. A 2022 study of New Zealand garden birds concluded that bellbird numbers are stable or locally increasing. Known increases of bellbirds in some areas like Christchurch Port Hills, Lake Rotoiti, Craigieburns, Kapiti Island or Tiritiri Matangi are related to the control of invasive mammalian species.

== Relationship with humans ==
=== In Māori culture ===
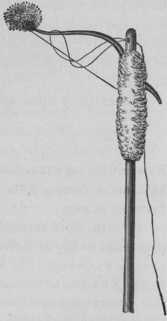
A snare called tuke was used by Māori to catch bellbirds.

The bellbird is regarded as taonga by the Māori, who traditionally valued it for its meat and singing abilities. There are many whakataukī (proverbs) that refer to the bellbird's singing. Early Māori, who deeply appreciated songs and oratories, compared skilled performers to bellbirds by saying "He rite ki te kōpara e kō nei i te ata" (Just like a korimako singing at dawn). In addition to proverbs highlighting the bellbird's singing abilities, some compare the restless nature of female bellbirds, who are constantly on the move, to that of irresponsible or even promiscuous women. An example is "Ehara! He kōpara kai rerere." (Hey! The bellbird is a restless bird.) which could describe an irresponsible woman. A well-known Māori song goes as follows:

Hūtia te rito o te harakeke,
kei hea te kōmako e kō?
Kī mai ki a au,
'He aha te mea nui i te ao?'
Māku e kī atu,
'He tāngata, he tāngata, he tāngata.

Translation:

If the flax heart is pulled out
Where will the korimako [bellbird] sing?
Ask me,
'What is most important in this world?'
And I will reply,
'People, people, people'

In the song above, the korimako (bellbird) represents humanity, while the flax symbolises the vitality of the land and its people. The proverb signifies that individuals will thrive if they receive the right support. New Zealand missionary Richard Taylor wrote in 1855 that in the Taupō region during a child's naming ceremony, a bellbird was cooked in a small, specially dedicated oven. Shortly after cooking, this "sweetest singing bird of New Zealand" was ritually eaten by a chief priest (tino ariki) to ensure that "the child might have a sweet voice, and become an admired orator". Such customs varied across the country. In some birth ceremonies, the bellbird was released alive rather than being cooked and eaten. Occasionally, a young chief was given bellbird meat as he grew to adulthood, with the hope that he would become a successful orator. A well-spoken orator was often simply called a korimako (bellbird). Bellbirds often eat the fruit of a small forest tree, Pennantia corymbosa, hence its Māori name kaikōmako ("food of the bellbird").

The Māori hunted bellbirds for their meat using various methods. They would employ spears or long, thin rods to strike the birds. Ground snare traps, known as puaka, were baited with honey flowers such as those from the pōhutukawa tree. During direct hunting, a fowler would hide in a shelter made from vegetation such as fern fronds or nīkau palm leaves. The fowler would then set up a low-lying horizontal perch snare above the shelter and attract bellbirds by imitating their calls, using a leaf held between the lips. Once a bird landed on the perch, the fowler would strike it. A method of catching live bellbirds involved using a trap called a tuke, which was a long, thin rod ending with a short horizontal section and a loop at the end of a long string. The trap's design allowed the trapper to close the loop when a bird landed on the end of the tuke, catching its feet.

Preparing a bellbird meal involved cooking the entire birds in earth ovens (hāngī). The bellbirds were plucked, but their internal organs were left intact to infuse a special flavour. Another cooking method involved wrapping the bellbirds in large puka or rangiora leaves and placing them in a shallow hole, about 15 cm deep. They were then covered with ashes and earth until cooked, ensuring that the juices, fat, and aromas were sealed in.

=== In culture ===
The call of Anthornis melanura is used by Radio New Zealand as an interval signal. The movie Bellbird was named after the New Zealand bellbird, as are places like Lake Bellbird on the West Coast and the historic building site the Sign of the Bellbird in the Port Hills near Christchurch.
