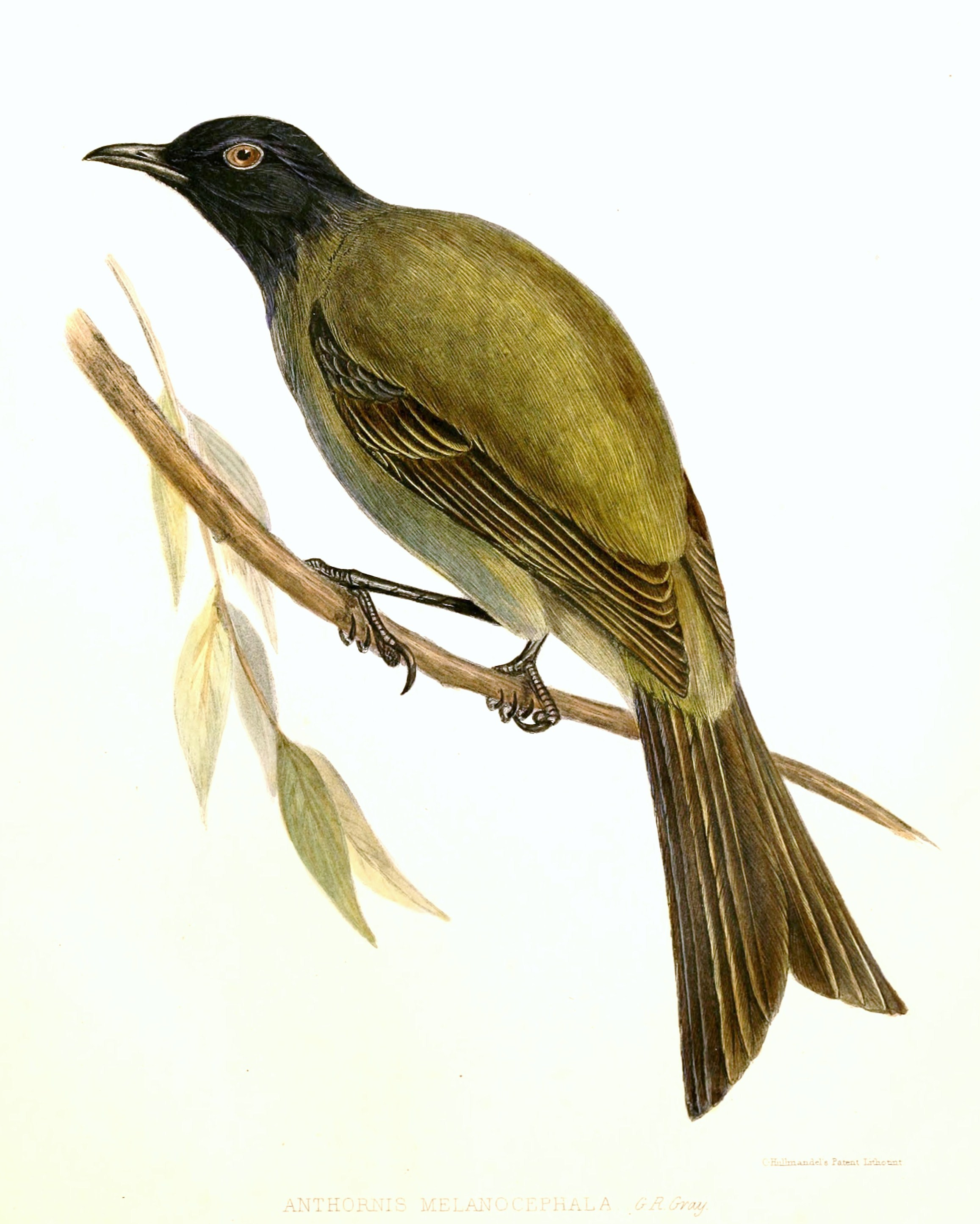

Conservation status
- Extinct (1906) (IUCN 3.1)

Scientific classification
- Kingdom: Animalia
- Phylum: Chordata
- Class: Aves
- Order: Passeriformes
- Family: Meliphagidae
- Genus: Anthornis
- Species: †A. melanocephala

Binomial name
- †Anthornis melanocephala G.R. Gray, 1843
- Original distribution on a map of the Chatham Islands

= Chatham Islands bellbird =

Extinct species of bird

The Chatham Islands bellbird (Anthornis melanocephala) or kōmako is an extinct species of bird in the family Meliphagidae. It was endemic to the Chatham Islands.

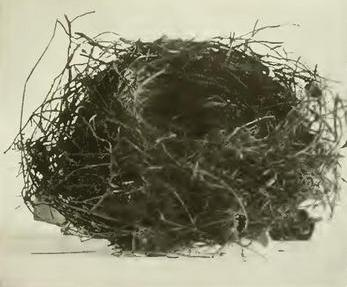
Nest

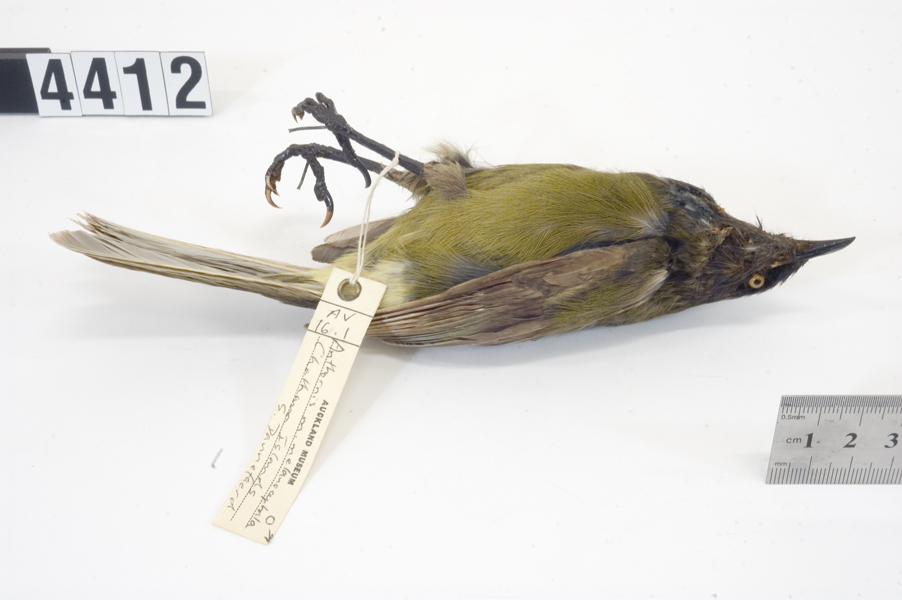
Chatham Island bellbird (Anthornis melanocephala) specimen from the Auckland Museum collection.

== Description ==
In appearance it was very similar to the New Zealand bellbird (Anthornis melanura) but was considerably larger. Also the whole of the head and neck was brightly glossed in purplish or steel-blue.

== Behaviour ==
The kōmako nested from August to October, usually laying three eggs in a larger nest than those made by mainland bellbirds. Its call was described as "the sweetest-throated of all the Antipodean songsters".

== Extinction ==
Cats were identified as the main cause of extinction after they reached Rangatira Island in 1831 and later Mangere Island.

It was last observed in 1906 on Little Mangere Island. The population was likely impacted by the introduction of a disease as there was a sudden population decline before the onset of other disturbances such as rats, cats and specimen collectors.
