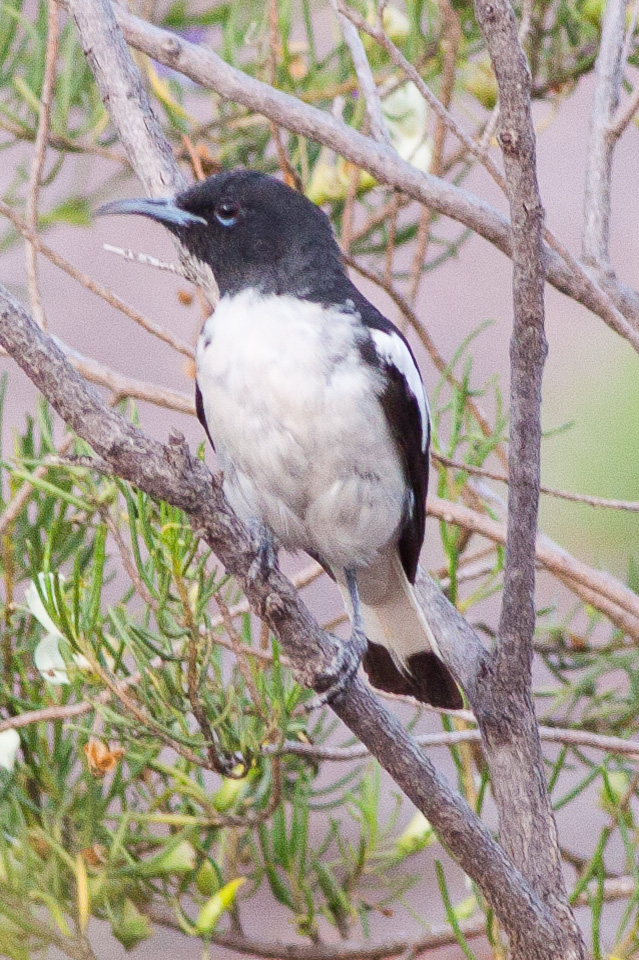

Conservation status
- Least Concern (IUCN 3.1)

Scientific classification
- Kingdom: Animalia
- Phylum: Chordata
- Class: Aves
- Order: Passeriformes
- Family: Meliphagidae
- Genus: Certhionyx; Lesson, 1830
- Species: C. variegatus

Binomial name
- Certhionyx variegatus Lesson, 1830
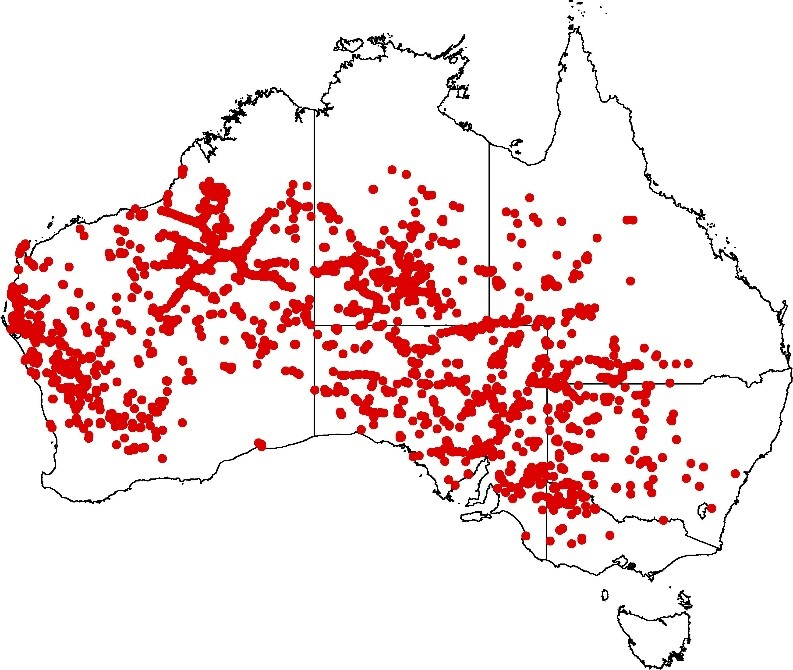
- Distribution of pied honeyeater

= Pied honeyeater =

Species of bird

The pied honeyeater (Certhionyx variegatus) is a species of bird in the family of honeyeaters Meliphagidae and the sole species in the genus Certhionyx (Christidis & Boles 2008). This species is also known as the black and white honeyeater or western pied honeyeater.

It is endemic to Australia and is listed as a vulnerable species under Schedule 2 of the Threatened Species Conservation Act 1995 (NSW).

== Taxonomy ==
In 1999, taxonomists had placed pied honeyeater (Certhionyx variegatus), banded honeyeater (Cissomela pectoralis) and black honeyeater (Sugomel nigrum) in the genus Certhionyx; however, revised DNA analysis indicates that these species are not closely related. Christidis and Boles placed the pied honeyeater in the clade Acanthagenys in its own monotypic genus. Genetic analysis indicates the pied honeyeater is the earliest offshoot of a lineage that gave rise to the tui and New Zealand bellbird of New Zealand, and plain honeyeater and marbled honeyeater of New Guinea.

== Description ==
The pied honeyeater has a long curved bill and a small pale-blue patch of bare skin below the eye which is semicircular in males and arc-shaped in females and juveniles. Males are black and white, having a black head, neck and upper parts, a white lower rump and upper tail, black wings with a white stripe, and white underparts with a black tipped tail. Females are brown above, with a grey-white chin, a whitish breast streaked and spotted dark-brown, white underparts and white stripe along the edges of the secondary wing feathers.

Adult weight is approximately 27 g (0.95 oz), making it a mid-sized honeyeater; its body length is generally between 15 and 20 cm (5.9 and 7.9 in), and the wingspan is between 25 and 29 cm (9.8 and 11.4 in). The long pointed wing characterizing Certhionyx variegatus reflects movements which extend over the breadth of the continent.

The call of the pied honeyeater has been described as a "mournful whistle, resembling that of the little grassbird (Megalurus gramineus)". During the breeding season it utters a "melancholy piping note".

A superficially similar honeyeater is the black honeyeater, (Sugomel nigrum). It has a different call, is smaller, with a finer bill, shorter tail and lacks the bare eye-patch. Males of this species also have a distinctive stripe down the center of the chest and abdomen, while females have plainer wings and less streaking on the breast.

== Distribution and habitat ==
In the early 1900s, this species was "widely distributed, principally over the southern half of the continent". Data mapping by [Gannon, 1962] shows occurrences primarily across central and western NSW, the arid interior, and the eastern parts of South Australia.

Birdlife Australia Atlas project data between 1998 and 2014 indicates that the pied honeyeater is found principally in a band below approximately 18 ° S, which extends roughly from central Queensland, central NSW and central Victoria in the east and across to the Western Australian coastline [Birdlife Australia, 2014].

=== Movements ===
Widely considered as nomadic and categorized by Keast as a "desert nomad", the pied honeyeater has more recently been found to be both sedentary–resident and irruptive, turning up occasionally in numbers far outside its normal range in tandem with heavy rains following drought periods.

Movements are poorly understood with no apparent pattern to occurrence or numbers in an area and limited knowledge of actual movements. Occurrences may coincide with the flowering of the emu-bush (Eremophila) [Gannon, 1962][Read, 2008], and perhaps the need to secure minimal breeding requirements via an abundance of insects. Migration and seasonal movements occur, particularly in coastal north-western Australia. "The pied honeyeater is one of the commonest winter visitors, occurring in great numbers immediately after the first heavy rain". There are some instances of residency, while occurrence has been irregularly observed at the periphery of its range.

The pied honeyeater appears to be largely independent in the use of free surface water; its distribution within the landscape is less consistent along gradients in relation to distance from water.

=== Habitat ===
The pied honeyeater is found in the arid and semi-arid zones, on the sandhills of inland plains, inland ranges, granite outcrops, and also on the coastal sandhills of Western Australia. It frequents shrublands and woodlands with the former dominated by emu bush (Eremophila spp.) and grevilleas, and the latter predominantly by mulga. Habitat may include a scattering of river red gum (Eucalyptus camaldulensis) along watercourses, and Casuarina and Myoporum along dry watercourses and dry salt-lakes.

Pied honeyeaters also inhabit spinifex-dominated grasslands within scattered areas of mulga (Acacia aneura), Casuarina, and bloodwood (Corymbia terminalis).

== Behaviour ==
There is little known about the social organization and behaviour of this species, in part due to its erratic movements, and also because individuals are widely characterized as very nervous, always on the move, very shy, "quick on the wing" and very timid [Burgess, 1946]. Birds are often seen singly or in pairs. However, early Australian records note movements of pied honeyeaters in constant flocks, "flying against the wind...in flocks at times of fifty or more" and in larger flocks of several hundred.

Seasonal flocks have been observed flying in the company of black honeyeaters (Sugomel nigrum), crimson chats (Epthianura tricolor), black-faced woodswallows (Artamus cinereus) and masked woodswallows (A. personatus). The pied honeyeater has been observed feeding in the company of black honeyeaters (S. nigrum), "greenies" (Ptilotis penicillata) and yellow-throated miners (Manorina flavigula).

During breeding displays, pairs sometimes fly into the air together and "literally loop and loop" [Burgess, 1946, p. 392] and a male may soar "singing, into the air from the top of a tree, and suddenly [drop], always turning over backward in its descent". Males advertising territorial display will, similarly, fly singing vertically into the air. Actions in the air appear similar to the black honeyeater [Burgess, 1946] and flight is said to resemble that of the critically endangered regent honeyeater (Anthochaera phrygia).

There is little information on feeding behaviour, although Shelly et al. note that the pied honeyeater is rarely observed feeding in mixed flocks. Information on agonistic behavior is also limited. However, territorial calling and aerial displays have been noted, while feigning of lameness or a broken wing, if disturbed off a nest containing young, has also been recorded.

=== Diet and foraging ===
The pied honeyeater feeds primarily on nectar, but also eats insects, fruit and seeds. It utilizes its long bill to explore flowers and foliage of trees and shrubs, especially Emu bush (e.g., Eremophila longifolia, E. sturtii), and various eucalypts (e.g., Eucalyptus largiflorens, E. ochrophloia), and Grevilleas. It has been observed feeding in lignum (Muehlenbeckia cunninghamii), flowering turpentine and tobacco-bush (Nicotiana glauca). It also feeds on the seeds of harlequin fuchsia-bush (Eremophila duttonii) and turpentine (Eremophila sturtii). Stomach content analysis has revealed "grape-like" seeds, berries, grit, and insects and their larvae (e.g., Coleoptera and Lepidoptera).

In the Australian desert, the Meliphagidae are highly dependent on free water, with the pied honeyeater being classified as a "summer drinker". It has been recorded drinking on more than half of the days on which the temperature exceeded 25 degrees C.

=== Reproduction ===
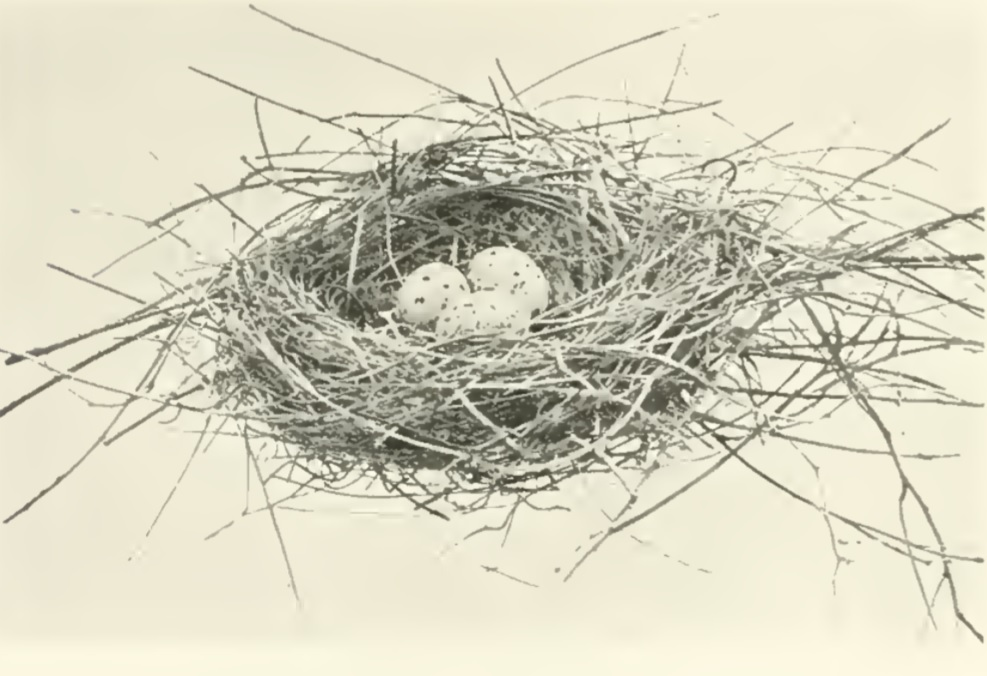
North, A 1909, p. 90 Pied honeyeater nest

June and the five following months constitute the usual breeding season of this species, nests with eggs being more frequently found in August and September. However, there have been examples of breeding in March in central and northern Australia, usually following heavy rains.

Both sexes contribute with nest construction, incubation of eggs and caring for the young. Nests can be built and eggs laid within 3 days [Burgess, 1946] and may be built in low shrubs or trees, including mulga, cork bark (Hakea lorea), sandalwood (Santalum) or on top of thick creepers, about 1.2 to 1.5 m (3.9 to 4.9 ft) above the ground. The nest is generally an open, deep, saucer-shaped, well-made structure constructed from twigs or short grass stems, e.g. spinifex, bound with spider-web, which may be placed on thin twigs at the end of a branch or at the junction of several thin horizontal leafy stems and suspended by the rim.

Egg sizes are approximately 1.6 cm (0.6 in) in width to 2.4 cm (0.9 in) in length. Shape varies from oval to rounded and elongate oval. The shell is close-grained, smooth and usually lustreless with a dull white base colour, over which is evenly distributed freckles and spots of blackish-brown, with underlying markings of dull bluish-grey.

=== Competition ===
There is limited information on competition and predation; however, the pied honeyeater is sometimes harassed in tree canopies by white-plumed honeyeaters (Ptilotula penicillatus) and yellow-throated miners (Manorina flavigula). Diurnal avian predation would seem to be one of the primary selective pressures tending to restrict all but essential drinking in desert birds, primarily that by the brown goshawk (Accipiter fasciatus), collared sparrowhawk (Accipiter cirrocephalus) and Australian hobby (Falco longipennis). Predation and competition aspects may be a useful area for further research on the pied honeyeater.

== Conservation ==
=== Conservation status ===
FEDERAL: Secure	QLD: Secure	SA:Secure	NT: Secure
NSW: Vulnerable	VIC: Secure	WA: Secure	TAS: Not present

The pied honeyeater is listed as least concern by the International Union for Conservation of Nature (IUCN) due to its extremely large range and apparent stability of population size; however, population size has not been quantified. It has been seen to be subject to threatening processes that generally act at the landscape scale (e.g. habitat loss or degradation) rather than at distinct, definable locations. The former Office of Environment & Heritage was developing a targeted approach for managing such landscape species, but the functions of that office now fall under the Department of Agriculture, Water and the Environment. It is unclear whether any studies are ongoing. Identified management actions in the plan included encouragement of the protection of rich nectar-producing patches of woodland and shrubs from stock and goats, development of educational and promotional information to generate conservation interest and status assessments. Targeted management strategies were also being implemented via the NSW Murray Biodiversity Management Plan.

The mobility of nomadic birds makes it difficult to gain a qualitative impression of population changes, and while migrants and nomads may give the illusion of abundance as large flocks aggregate at rich patches of food, they are not spread evenly across the landscape and their total numbers are often fewer than appears.

== Other Sources ==
- Environment & Heritage NSW nd. Pied honeyeater (Certhionyx variegatus), Department of Environment & Heritage NSW. Available from: <http://www.environment.nsw.gov.au/savingourspeciesapp/project.aspx?ProfileID=10156> [11 October 2014]
- Ford, H 2013, Are we underestimating the threat to Australia's migratory land birds? Pacific Conservation Biology, vol. 19, pp. 303–311.
- Howe, F & Ross, J 1933, On the occurrence of Psophodes nigrogularis in Victoria, Emu, vol. 32 no.3, pp. 133–148.
- Schodde, R & Mason, I 1999, The directory of Australian birds: Passerines, CSIRO Publishing, Collingwood, Vic.
- Smith P, Pressey, R & Smith, J 1994, Birds of particular conservation concern in the Western Division of New South Wales, Biological Conservation, vol.69 no. 3, pp. 315–338.
