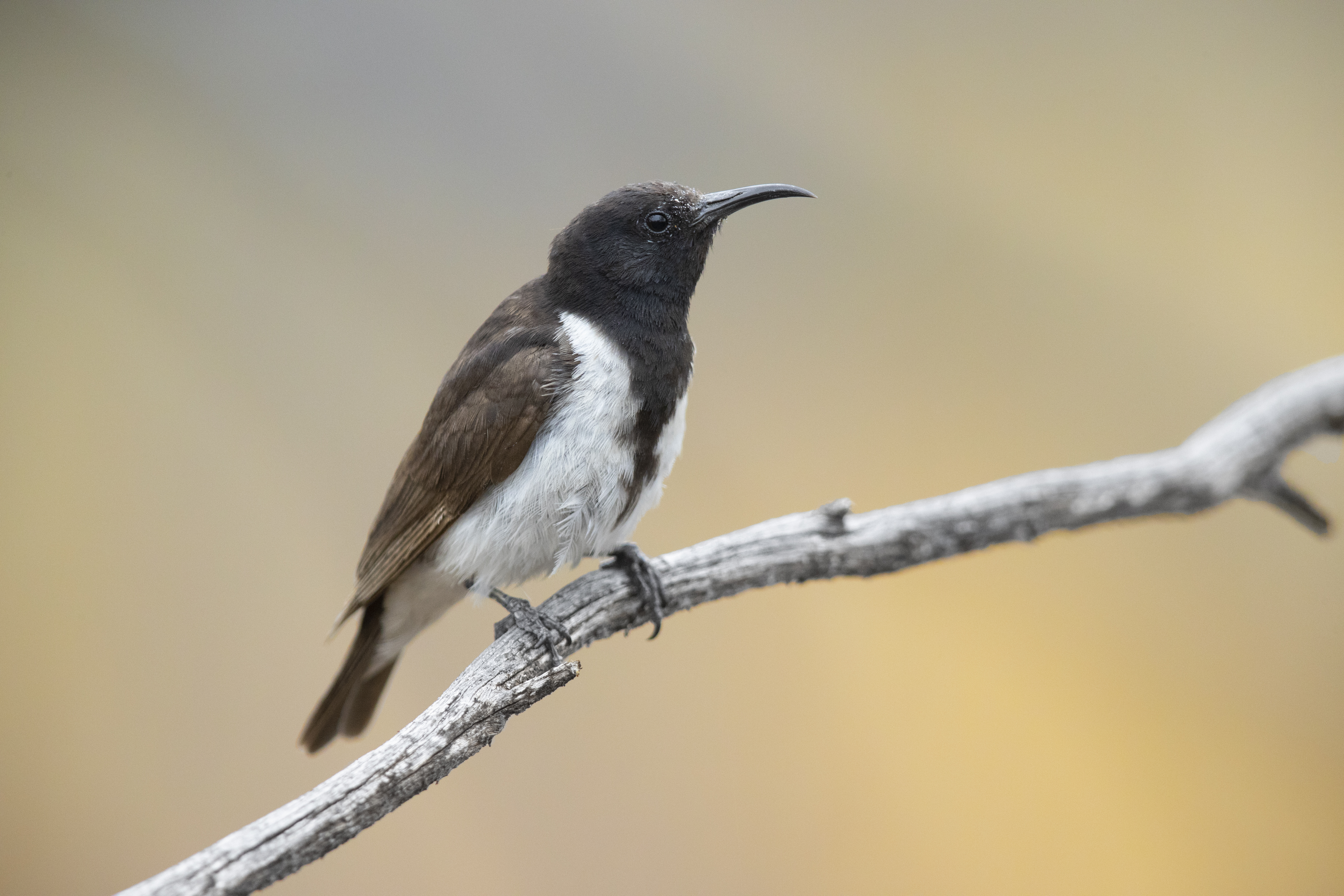
- A male

Conservation status
- Least Concern (IUCN 3.1)

Scientific classification
- Kingdom: Animalia
- Phylum: Chordata
- Class: Aves
- Order: Passeriformes
- Family: Meliphagidae
- Genus: Sugomel; Mathews, 1922
- Species: S. nigrum

Binomial name
- Sugomel nigrum (Gould, 1838)
- Approximate distribution of the black honeyeater

Synonyms
- Myzomela nigra Gould, 1838; Certhionyx niger (Gould, 1838) Salomonsen, 1967; Glyciphila nisoria Salvadori, 1878; Sugomel nigrum (Gould, 1838)

= Black honeyeater =

Species of birds

The black honeyeater (Sugomel nigrum) is a species of bird in the honeyeater family Meliphagidae and the sole species in the genus Sugomel. The black honeyeater exhibits sexual dimorphism, with the male being black and white while the female is a speckled grey-brown; immature birds look like the female. The species is endemic to Australia, and ranges widely across the arid areas of the continent, through open woodland and shrubland, particularly in areas where the emu bush and related species occur.

A nectar feeder, the black honeyeater has a long curved bill to reach the base of tubular flowers such as those of the emu bush. It also takes insects in the air, and regularly eats ash left behind at campfires. Cup-shaped nests are built in the forks of small trees or shrubs. The male engages in a soaring song flight in the mating season, but contributes little to nest-building or incubating the clutch of two or three eggs. Both sexes feed and care for the young. While the population appears to be decreasing, the black honeyeater is sufficiently numerous and widespread and hence is considered to be of least concern on the International Union for Conservation of Nature (IUCN)'s Red List of Endangered species.

== Taxonomy ==
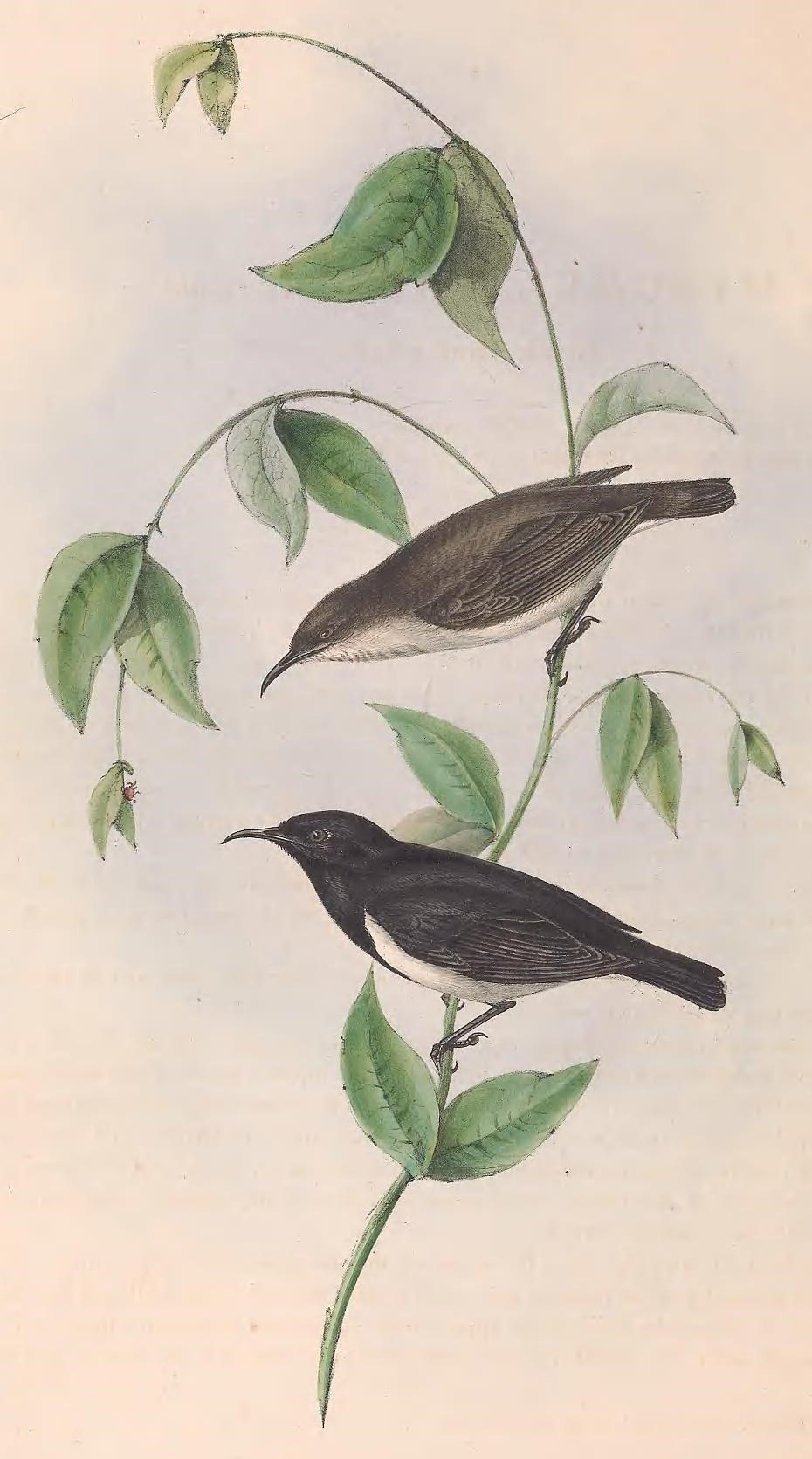
John and Elizabeth Gould's illustration of a female and male drawn from nature

The black honeyeater was first described by English naturalist John Gould in 1838 as Myzomela nigra, using as the specific epithet the Latin adjective niger 'black'. The genus name was derived from the Ancient Greek words myzo 'to suckle' and meli 'honey', and referred to the bird's nectivorous habits. Italian ornithologist Tommaso Salvadori described it as Glyciphila nisoria in 1878, though he incorrectly wrote that it originated in New Guinea. In the 1913 Official Checklist of the Birds of Australia, Australian amateur ornithologist Gregory Mathews placed the black honeyeater in the genus Cissomela with the banded honeyeater. He then placed it in its own genus Sugomel in 1922, the name being derived from the Latin sugo 'suck', and mel 'honey'. In 1967 ornithologist Finn Salomonsen transferred the species from Myzomela to the genus Certhionyx, which also contained the banded honeyeater (Certhionyx pectoralis) and pied honeyeater (Certhionyx variegatus), and later authorities accepted this classification. Australian ornithologists Richard Schodde and Ian J. Mason kept the three in the same genus, but conceded the basis for this was weak and classified each species in its own subgenus—Sugomel for the black honeyeater.

In a 2004 genetic study of nuclear and mitochondrial DNA of honeyeaters, the three species classified in the genus Certhionyx were found not to be closely related to one another. Instead, the black honeyeater was closely related to species within Myzomela after all. However, it was an early offshoot and quite divergent genetically, leading study authors Amy Driskell and Les Christidis to recommend it be placed in its own genus rather than returned to Myzomela. It was subsequently moved to the resurrected genus Sugomel. A 2017 genetic study using both mitochondrial and nuclear DNA indicated that the ancestor of the black honeyeater diverged from that of the scaly-crowned honeyeater (Lichmera lombokia at the time, also reclassified into Sugomel in 2022) just under a million years ago, and that the two have some affinities with the genus Myzomela. It is identified as Sugomel niger by the International Ornithological Committee's (IOC) Birdlist. Mathews described two subspecies—Myzomela nigra westralensis from Western Australia on the basis of smaller size and darker plumage, and Myzomela nigra ashbyi from Mount Barker, South Australia, on the basis of larger size and paler plumage—neither of which is regarded as distinct today.

DNA analysis has shown the honeyeater family Meliphagidae to be related to the Pardalotidae (pardalotes), Acanthizidae (Australian warblers, scrubwrens, thornbills, etc.), and the Maluridae (Australian fairy-wrens) in a large superfamily Meliphagoidea. The Papuan black myzomela, (Myzomela nigrita), found in Indonesia and Papua New Guinea is also known as the black honeyeater. It is a different but related species.

Black honeyeater has been adopted as the official name by the IOC. It is also known as the charcoal bird from collecting ashes after campfires.

== Description ==
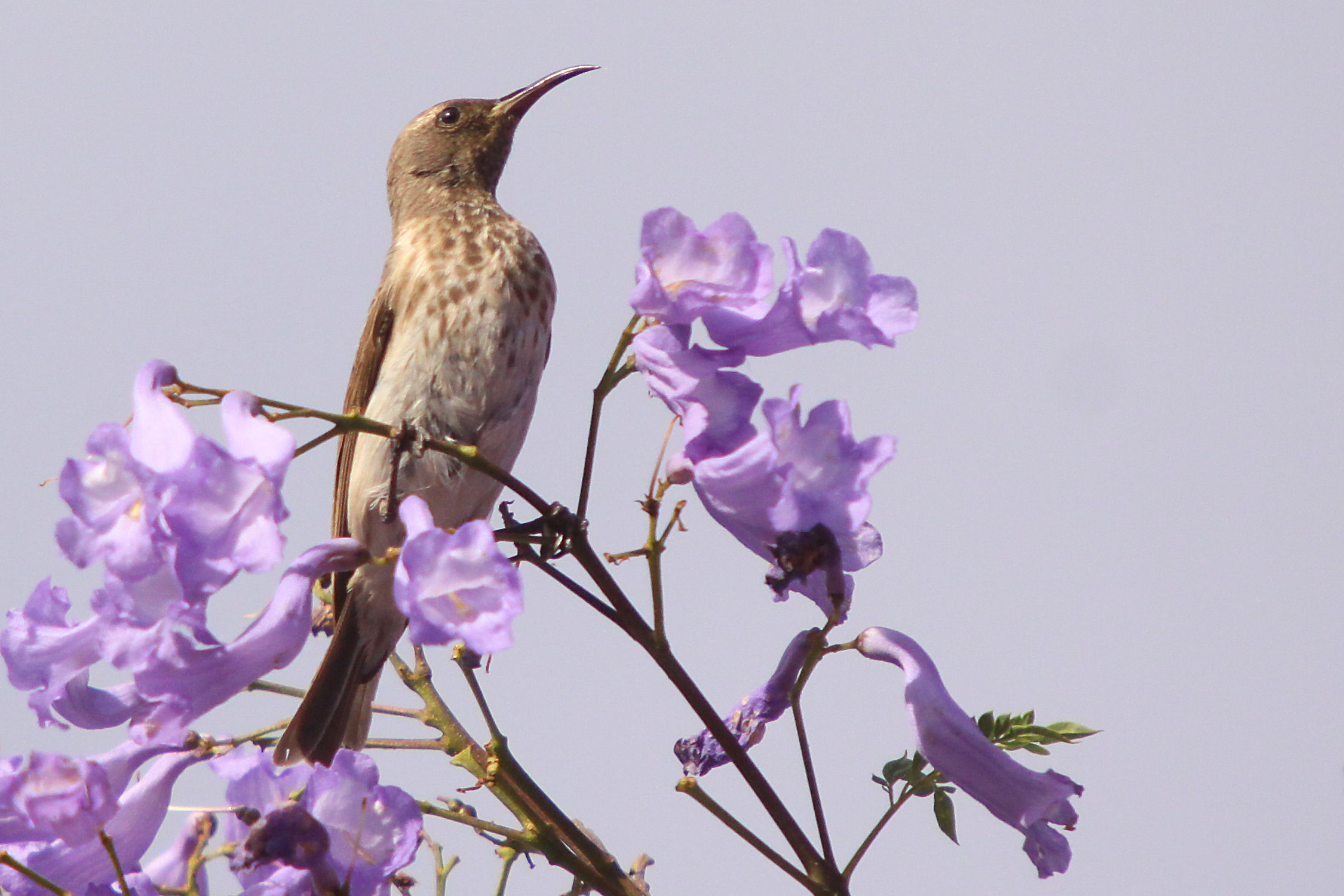
A female on a Jacaranda

The black honeyeater has a long, slender, down-curved bill, a small rounded head and slender neck set on a plump body, and a short, slightly cleft tail. It is between 10 and 13 cm (3.9 and 5.1 in) long, with an average wingspan of around 19 cm (7.5 in) and a weight of 9.5 g (0.34 oz). It has relatively long, pointed wings for a honeyeater, and very long wings for such a small bird, the development of which has been attributed to its feeding behaviour of flying between shrubs and hovering over flowers.

The species is strongly sexually dimorphic. Adult males are black and white, with a black head, neck, wings and upperparts, and a black stripe running down from the centre of the chest to the abdomen, and with a white belly, flanks and under-tail coverts. The female's crown, ear coverts and upper parts are buff brown, scalloped paler, with a pale eyebrow, and the chest is speckled grey-brown grading into a dull white belly. In both male and female the iris is dark brown and the bill and legs blackish brown. Immature birds are similar to the adult female; however, the upper breast and throat tend to be more uniform grey-brown and the base of the bill is paler; they are not distinguishable from adult females at a distance.

The black honeyeater is quiet when not breeding, but calls before and during the nesting season, often early in the morning. The calls include a soft metallic "chwit, chwit"; a louder note, a "tieee", with a monotonously even pitch and spacing at intervals of several seconds between notes; and a weak "peeee", usually uttered by breeding males. A soft scolding call is given by both sexes after the young hatch, which may be a call to alert the young they have food. The species is also heard making a bill snap when hawking insects. It is constantly on the move, hovering and hawking when feeding, and chasing intruders at food sources. Gould described its flight as "remarkably quick, and performed with zigzag starts".

== Distribution and habitat ==
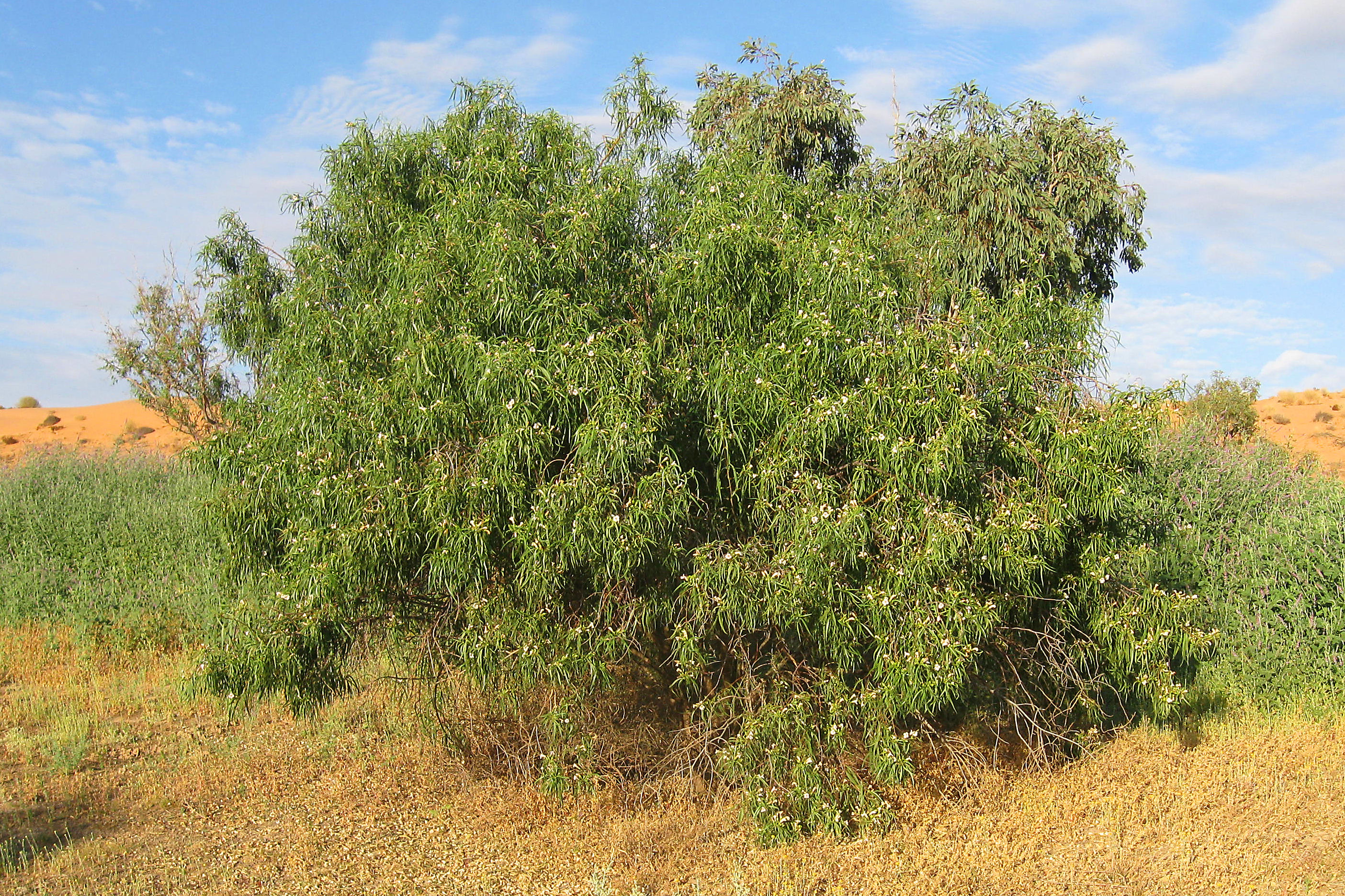
An emu bush, Eremophila, in the Simpson Desert

The black honeyeater is a bird of the dry inland of Australia, being generally widespread though scattered in western Queensland and New South Wales to the South Australian border, and occasionally recorded in the Mallee and Wimmera regions of Victoria. In South Australia, it occurs in the south-east and it is widespread in the central and northern regions of Western Australia, with some rare sightings in the south near Kalgoorlie. In the Northern Territory, it is widespread around Alice Springs, with some vagrants to the Top End.

It is dependent on the presence of the berrigan emu bush (Eremophila longifolia) and related species. As a result, the black honeyeater is found in open woodlands and shrublands of arid and semi-arid regions, as well as in mulga or mallee woodlands, and it is also found in spinifex savanna where flowering shrubs such as grevilleas and paperbarks occur. It has been noted that the black honeyeater is able to locate emu bushes, even when clumps consist of only two or three and are separated by many kilometres of country, which suggests the importance of this plant–bird association.

The black honeyeater is considered to be migratory rather than strictly nomadic, with regular seasonal movements related to flowering of food plants, especially the emu bush. Some move south in the Southern Hemisphere spring and summer, and northwards again in autumn and winter. During severe droughts it has been recorded south of Bendigo and in the Hunter Region. Irruptions (sudden population increases) can occur in some areas after rain or the movement of floodwaters. Breeding has generally been recorded in the drainage basins of Cooper Creek and the Darling River in southwestern Queensland and northwestern New South Wales, as well as in the Pilbara and Gascoyne regions in Western Australia. However, favourable conditions may result in it breeding anywhere during an irruption.

== Behaviour ==
The black honeyeater is usually encountered alone or in pairs, though up to 50 may gather at stands of plants in flower.

=== Breeding ===
The breeding season is from July to December (mostly between August and November), or opportunistically after rain. There is apparently some variation based upon location, with birds in Western Australia nesting earlier, whilst those in Queensland breed as late as March. Black honeyeater populations concentrate for breeding wherever the right plants are in flower and there is an abundance of insects, both essential for feeding the young. At the beginning of the mating season, males can be seen soaring in "song flights", which consist of a series of zigzagging movements, high into the air, accompanied by constant calling. The birds appear to stiffen themselves, with wings pointed downward, as they rise, while uttering a two-note call.

Black honeyeaters gather into loose groups of up to fifty birds during the breeding season, with only several pairs within the group breeding. The males agonistically defend a small breeding territory against members of their own species as well as other honeyeaters. Both members of the pair seem to be involved in selecting the nest site. The nest is usually low on a dead limb or in a fork of a small tree or shrub, though sometimes fallen timber is chosen as the nest site. The female gathers nesting material close to the nest site, while the male is engaged in song flights, and she builds the shallow, open, cup-shaped nest from fine twigs, grass, and other plant material bound with spiderweb, lining it with grass, roots, fibre, horse hair, flowers, or wool. As the young grow, the nest can become flattened to a saucer shape, and may be an almost flat platform by the time the chicks fledge.

The female lays two to three eggs, which are 15 mm (0.6 in) long, 12 mm (0.5 in) wide and have an unusual swollen oval shape. The eggs are slightly lustrous, buffy white in colour and dotted with reddish-brown and grey blotches that often appear in a cloud over the larger end of the eggs. Black honeyeater nests are occasionally parasitised by Horsfield's bronze-cuckoo (Chrysococcyx basalis). The female incubates alone, leaving the eggs exposed for short periods during the day to take insects in the air. When approached, the sitting bird attempts to hide by sinking into the nest and, if unsuccessful in deterring the intruder, will tumble to the ground with outstretched wings, giving weak calls in an effort to lure the intruder away from the nest. While the female is incubating, the male remains on guard at one of several regular vantage points. The incubation period is around sixteen days, and the fledging period approximately eighteen days. On hatching, the young birds' eyes are closed, and they are naked except for tufts of down on the head, nape and back. Both sexes feed and care for the young, taking all the insects for the young birds in the air. At one nest, two small young were fed every ten minutes or so, with the male bringing food three to four times more often than the female. All birds leave the vicinity of the nesting site within a few days of the young fledging.

=== Food and feeding ===
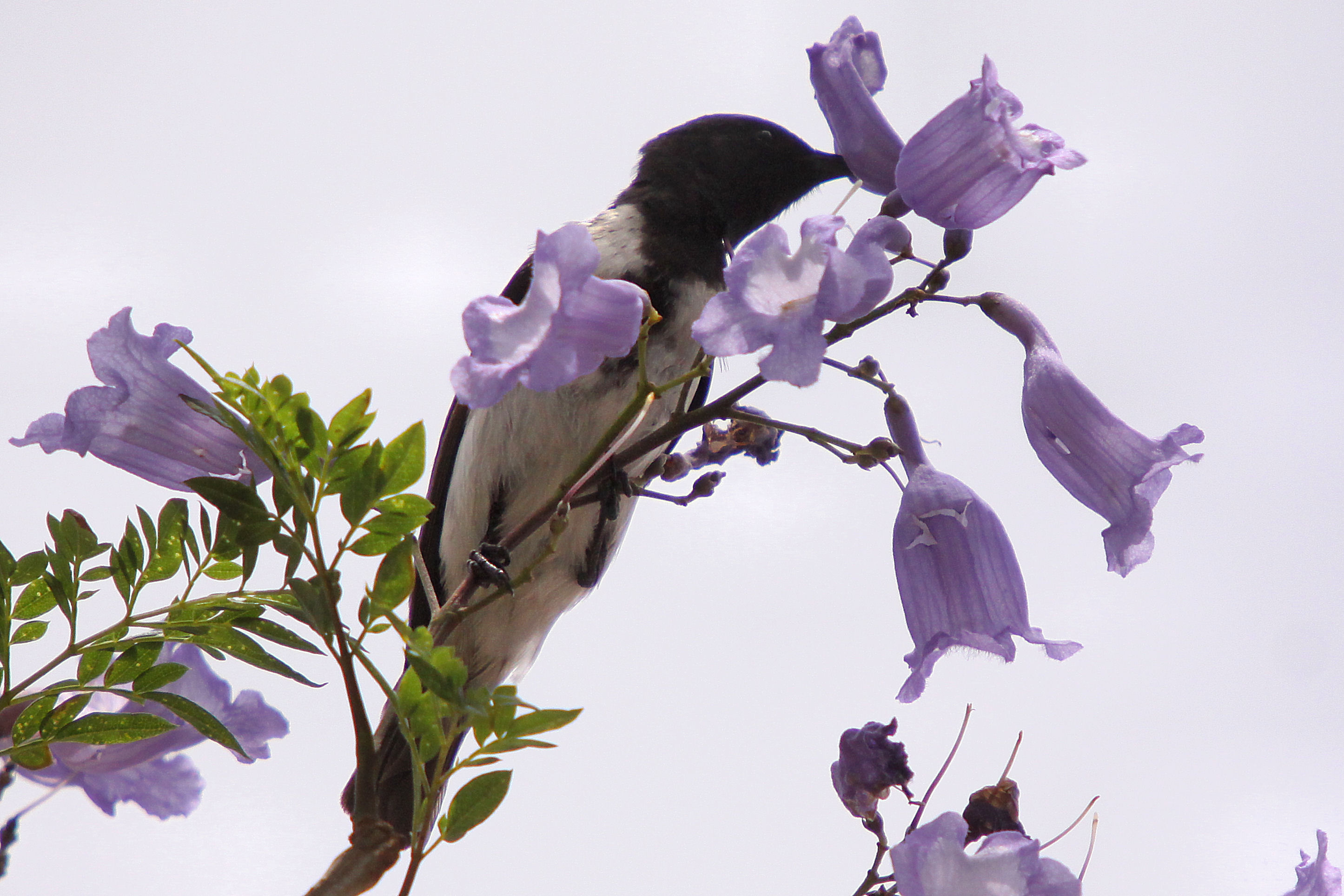
A male feeding in a Jacaranda

The black honeyeater feeds on nectar, probing flowers and foliage with its long, fine bill. It is mainly found in the crowns of eucalypts, at clumps of mistletoe or in shrubs, especially emu bushes (Eremophila). Observations over a twelve-month period in South Australia recorded black honeyeaters visiting the flowers of berrigan emu bush, twin-leaf emu bush (Eremophila oppositifolia), lerp mallee (Eucalyptus incrassata), and holly grevillea (Grevillea ilicifolia). The species was also frequently observed hawking for small insects. The black honeyeater hovers around flowers, feeding briefly at each one. It may sometimes form large mixed flocks at food sources, associating with other birds such as pied honeyeaters and white-browed woodswallows (Artamus superciliosus). Like many other honeyeaters, the black honeyeater catches insects in flight. The male, in particular, flies up to a height of 15 metres (50 ft) to seize an insect in mid-air, and then drops to a regularly used perch.

A study of black honeyeaters at seven sites in Western Australia regularly recorded breeding females eating ash from campsite fires and often making repeated visits over a brief period of time. It was noted that the birds seemed attracted to the remote campfire with groups of around six hovering around and landing beside the fire, an activity described as similar to "bees buzzing around a honeypot". After pecking at the ash, some of the females foraged for insects, sallying from the foliage of nearby Wheatbelt wandoos (Eucalyptus capillosa) before returning for more ash. The activity of the females approaching the fire ranged from a single peck to sustained feeding for a minute or more. Male birds occasionally landed near the fire, but none were seen to take ash. Well-developed brood patches on the birds mist netted near the fires, suggest that the females take ash around the time of laying, and throughout the incubation and feeding period. Wood ash is rich in calcium and it was hypothesised that the females were eating ash to form medullary bone before egg-laying or to repair a calcium deficit after laying. When other small birds, such as American hummingbirds, were recorded eating calcium-rich ash, bones or shell, it was suggested that the bones of small species may not be able to store enough calcium for egg production.

== Conservation status ==
Despite the fact that the population trend appears to be decreasing, the decline is not believed to be particularly rapid; the current population seems to be of sufficient numbers, and the species has a sufficiently large range, for the species to be evaluated as a species of least concern by the International Union for Conservation of Nature (IUCN). However, biologist Claire A. Runge and colleagues observed that the black honeyeaters' range across inland Australia contracted after years of low rainfall and showed a slow and incomplete recovery even after several years. They added that although nomadic species such as the black honeyeater may have a large distribution, they are often habitat specialists and hence may occupy only a small area within their range. Thus the risk of extinction of these species may be underestimated. The black honeyeater may be adversely affected by the loss of the emu bush due to grazing and weed control by farmers.
