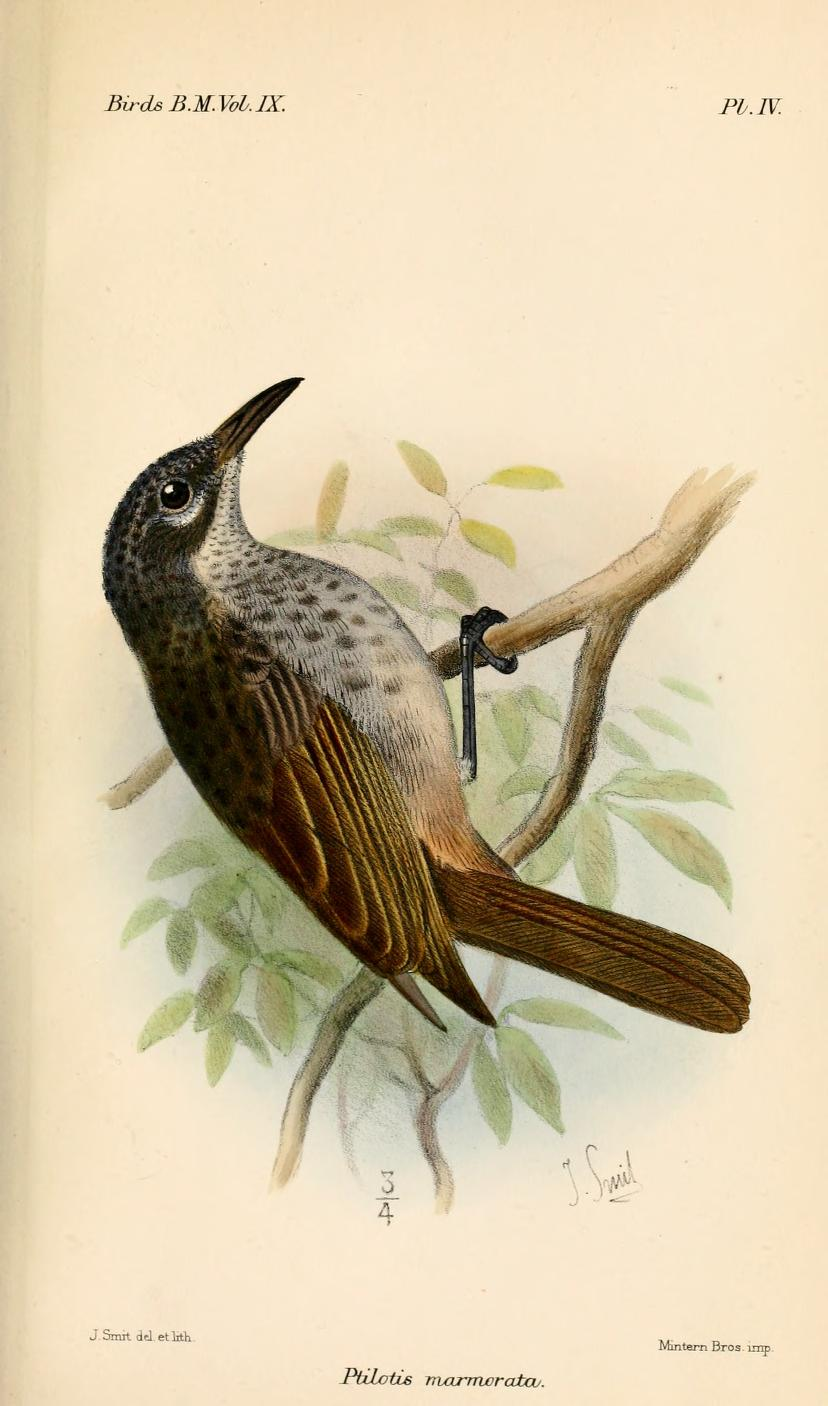
- Marbled honeyeater (Pinarostola cinereus)

Scientific classification
- Kingdom: Animalia
- Phylum: Chordata
- Class: Aves
- Order: Passeriformes
- Family: Meliphagidae
- Genus: Pinarostola; Sangster et al., 2023

Type species
- Ptilotis cinerea Sclater, PL, 1874

= Pinarostola =

Genus of birds

Pinarostola is a genus of birds in the honeyeater family Meliphagidae. The two species placed in the genus are endemic to New Guinea.

== Taxonomy ==
The two species now placed in this genus were formerly placed in the genus Pycnopygius. A molecular genetic study published in 2017 found that the genus was not monophyletic. In 2023, to create monophyletic genera, George Sangster and collaborators moved two species, the marbled honeyeater and the plain honeyeater, to a new genus, Pinarostola. They designated the marbled honeyeater as the type species. The genus name Pinarostola combines the Ancient Greek πιναρος/pinaros meaning "dirty" with στολη/stolē meaning "garment" or "robe".

The genus contains two species:

Image	Name	Common name
	Pinarostola cinereus	Marbled honeyeater
	Pinarostola ixoides	Plain honeyeater
