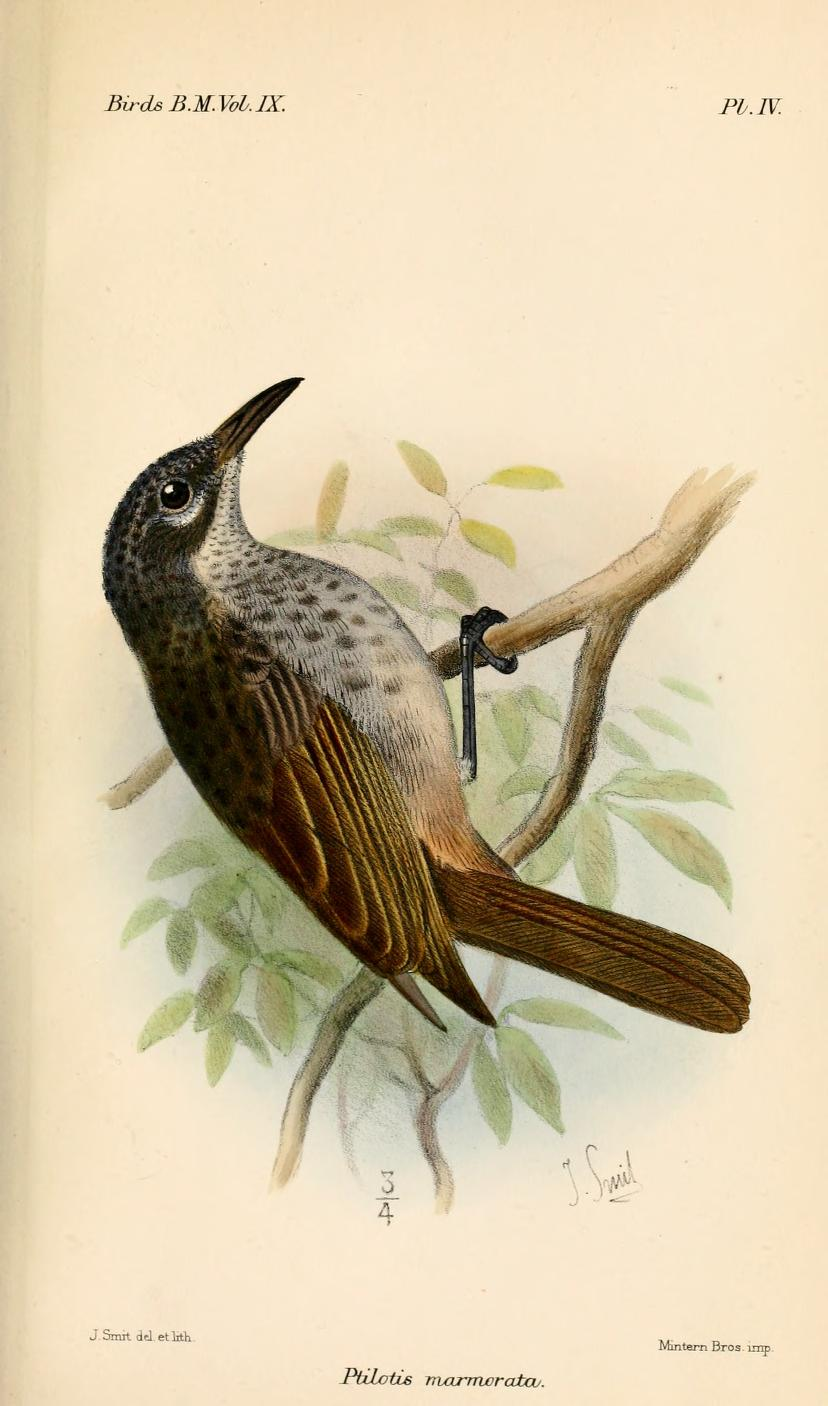
- Illustration by Joseph Smit, 1884

Conservation status
- Least Concern (IUCN 3.1)

Scientific classification
- Kingdom: Animalia
- Phylum: Chordata
- Class: Aves
- Order: Passeriformes
- Family: Meliphagidae
- Genus: Pinarostola
- Species: P. cinereus

Binomial name
- Pinarostola cinereus (Sclater, PL, 1874)

Synonyms
- Ptilotis marmorata

= Marbled honeyeater =

Species of bird

The marbled honeyeater (Pinarostola cinereus) is a species of bird in the family Meliphagidae. The size of the marbled honeyeater is found to be 20–22 cm. The bird is classified as medium-sized with a medium-length solid bill. The male is 40–58 grams while the female is 36–46 grams in size. This species was formerly placed in the genus Pycnopygius

== Description ==
There are two subspecies of the marbled honeyeater, Pinarostola cinereus dorsalis and Pinarostola cinereus cinereus. While the two subspecies are similar in appearance, they show slight differences. The marbled honeyeater is described by a variety of colors. The bird's head is dark brown with fine gray streaks on the forehead and bolder streaks on the neck. Around the eyes, the bird has a pale patch and a gray circle. Its upper body is brown with pale gray or olive edges, giving it a streaked look. The wings and tail are brown with olive tones. The underbody is a dusky gray with faint lighter markings and its bill is black, and the legs are light blue-gray.

== Distribution and habitat ==
It is found in the New Guinea Highlands. Its natural habitats are subtropical or tropical moist lowland forests and subtropical or tropical moist montane forests. Marbled honeyeaters are found in the hill forest and lower and middle montane forest. The nominate subspecies P. c. cinereus, is found in the eastern highlands of Papua New Guinea. The second subspecies, P. c. dorsalis, is found in the northern and western parts of Papua New Guinea. Some of the parts include the Adelbert Mountains and the Vogelkop Peninsula. The bird species is also found on Mt. Edward Albert. The species is seen in the oak forests and patches of secondary growth within grassland. In the Eastern Highlands, they are primarily seen in the forest edge and in secondary growth. The bird species has also been recorded within forest interiors.

== Diet and feeding ==
The marbled honeyeaters diet includes nectar, parts of flowers, insects, and small fruits. Their fruit is usually 2-7 cm in diameter and they tend to eat berries in an area of secondary growth. Their diet does not require a lot of movement which leads to this bird being described by Peter J. Higgins, Les Christidis, and Hugh Ford, from Cornell Lab as "inconspicuous and rather sluggish."

== Behavior and movement ==
The marbled honeyeater does not migrate, and has not been documented outside of the eastern highlands of Papua New Guinea, according to the IUCN Red List. They have a steady population and are on the "least concern" list as of 2018. Looking at the marbled honeyeaters' behavior, they have a distinct nature to them. The marbled honeyeater is typically silent, but sometimes the marbled honeyeater will have a low call by repeating itself in intervals of two seconds. The marbled honeyeater travels from tree to tree throughout the day, but typically spends much time looking for food.

== Other information ==
According to Higgins, Christidis, and Ford from Cornell Lab, very little is known about this species. The marbled honeyeater population is unknown with no official estimates, it is noted that the population is not threatened and the marbled honeyeater is considered "locally common." A nestling was recorded in March, and a female with an enlarged ovary was observed in November. Other relevant information is scarce, although descriptions of eggs have been documented. Due to the lack of information about the bird species, not a lot is documented about this particular bird.
