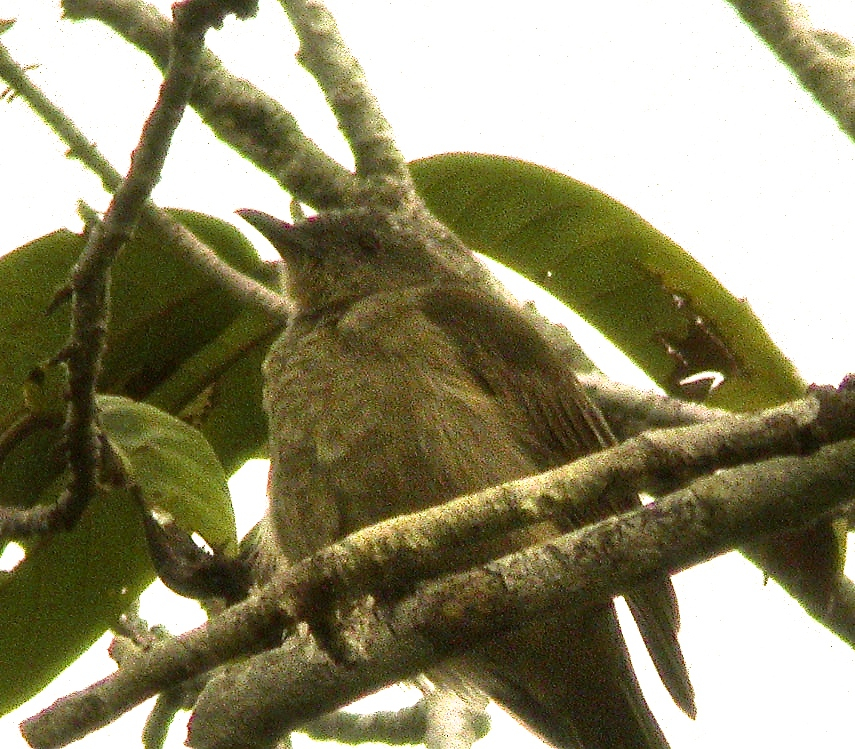

Conservation status
- Least Concern (IUCN 3.1)

Scientific classification
- Kingdom: Animalia
- Phylum: Chordata
- Class: Aves
- Order: Passeriformes
- Family: Meliphagidae
- Genus: Pinarostola
- Species: P. ixoides

Binomial name
- Pinarostola ixoides (Salvadori, 1878)

= Plain honeyeater =

Species of bird

The plain honeyeater (Pinarostola ixoides) is a species of bird in the family Meliphagidae. It was formerly placed in the genus Pycnopygius. It is found in Indonesia and Papua New Guinea. Its natural habitat is subtropical or tropical moist lowland forests.
