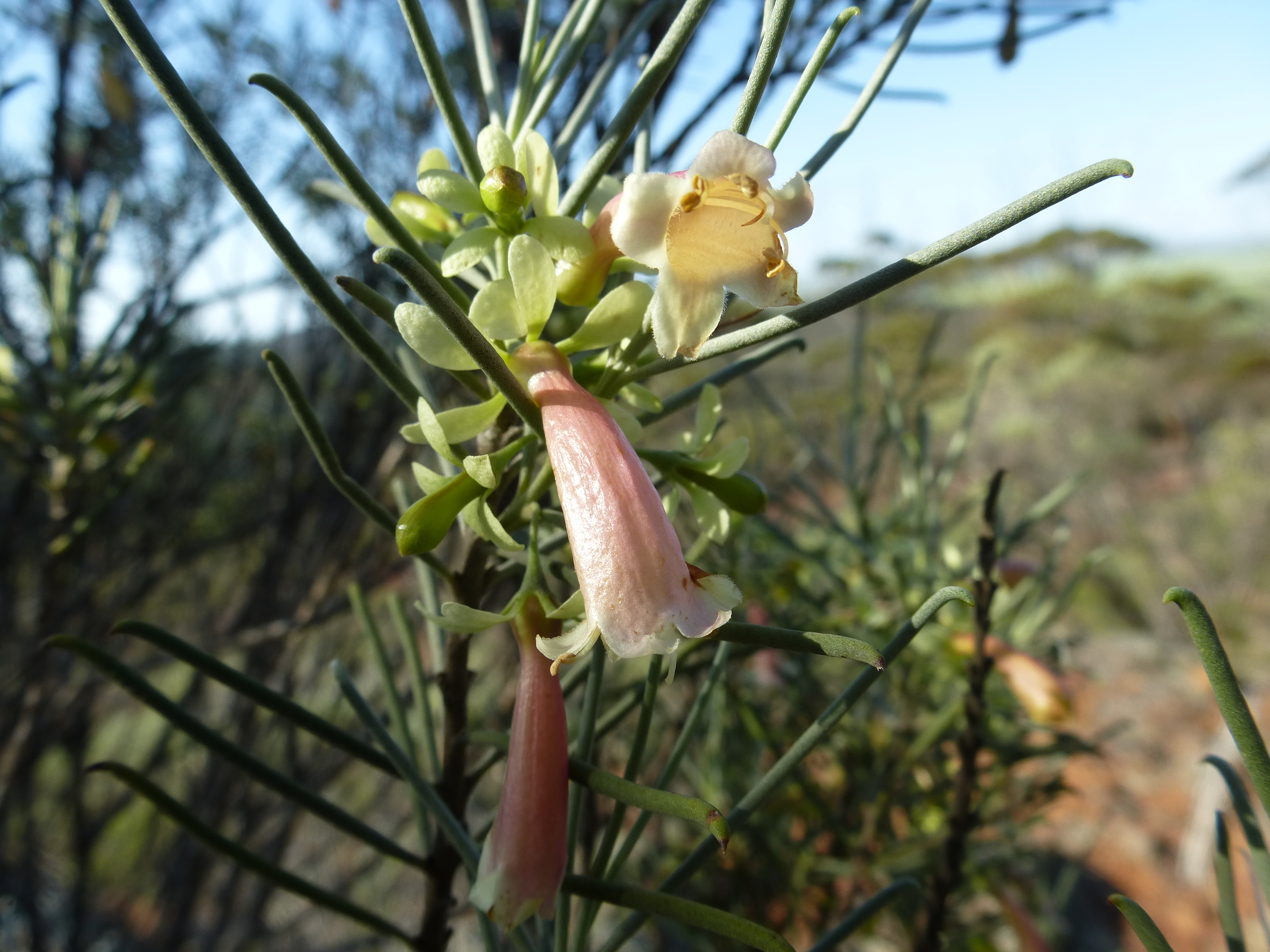
- Subspecies angustifolia near Wongan Hills

Conservation status
- Least Concern (IUCN 3.1)

Scientific classification
- Kingdom: Plantae
- Clade: Tracheophytes
- Clade: Angiosperms
- Clade: Eudicots
- Clade: Asterids
- Order: Lamiales
- Family: Scrophulariaceae
- Genus: Eremophila
- Species: E. oppositifolia

Binomial name
- Eremophila oppositifolia R.Br.

Synonyms
- Bondtia oppositifolia Kuntze orth. var.; Bontia oppositifolia (R.Br.) Kuntze; Pholidia oppositifolia (R.Br.) Wettst.

= Eremophila oppositifolia =

Weeooka

Species of plant

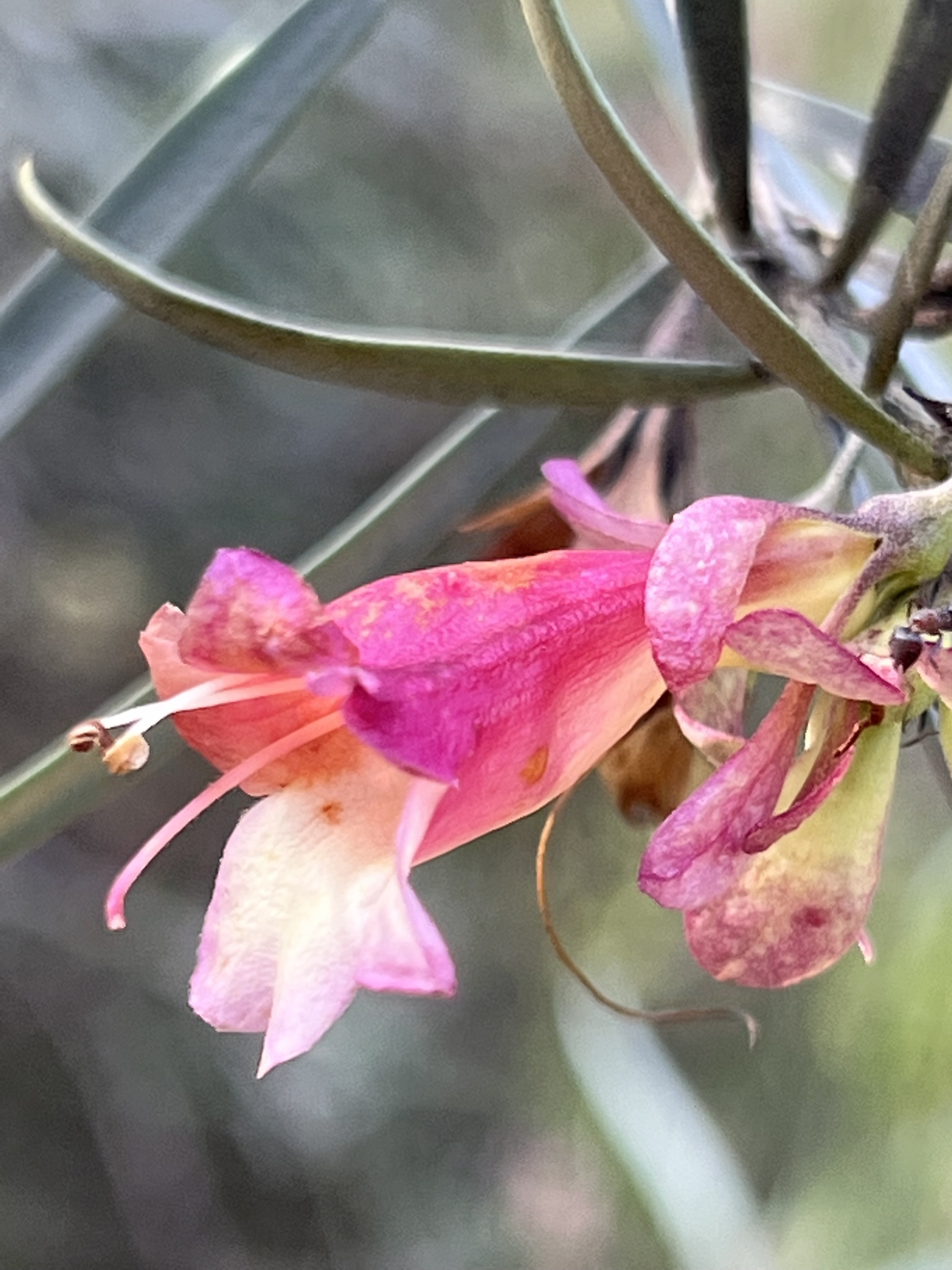
Subspecies rubra

Eremophila oppositifolia, commonly known as weeooka, twin-leaf emu bush and mountain sandalwood, is a plant in the figwort family, Scrophulariaceae, and is endemic to Australia. It is a shrub or small tree with its leaves arranged in opposite pairs and has cream to red or sometimes maroon coloured flowers. It occurs in all mainland states, but not the Northern Territory.

== Description ==
Eremophila oppositifolia is a shrub or small tree which grows to a height of 1–5 metres (3–20 ft), sometimes to 10 metres (30 ft). Its branches, leaves and flower stalks are covered with a layer of fine hairs pressed against the surface. The branches are rough due to persistent leaf bases and sometimes become glabrous with age. The leaves are arranged in opposite pairs along the branches and are linear to almost cylindrical in shape and often have a hooked end. They are 29–120 millimetres (1–5 in) long, 0.9–7 millimetres (0.04–0.3 in) wide, covered with fine hairs pressed against the surface and the young leaves also have yellowish glandular hairs on the lower surface.

The flowers are borne singly or in groups of up to 4 in leaf axils on hairy stalks 3–10.5 mm (0.1–0.4 in) long. There are 5 hairy, spoon-shaped to lance-shaped sepals which are mostly 7–18 mm (0.3–0.7 in) long and which are cream-coloured or brown. The petals are mostly 20–30 mm (0.8–1 in) long and are joined at their lower end to form a tube. The petal tube is cream-coloured with a pink tinge, pink, red or (rarely) maroon. The tube and its lobes are glabrous apart from the margins of the lobes, and the inside of the tube which is hairy. The 4 stamens extend slightly beyond the end of the petal tube. Flowering occurs from winter to early summer and the fruits which follow are oval to cylindrical in shape and 4–7 mm (0.2–0.3 in) long.

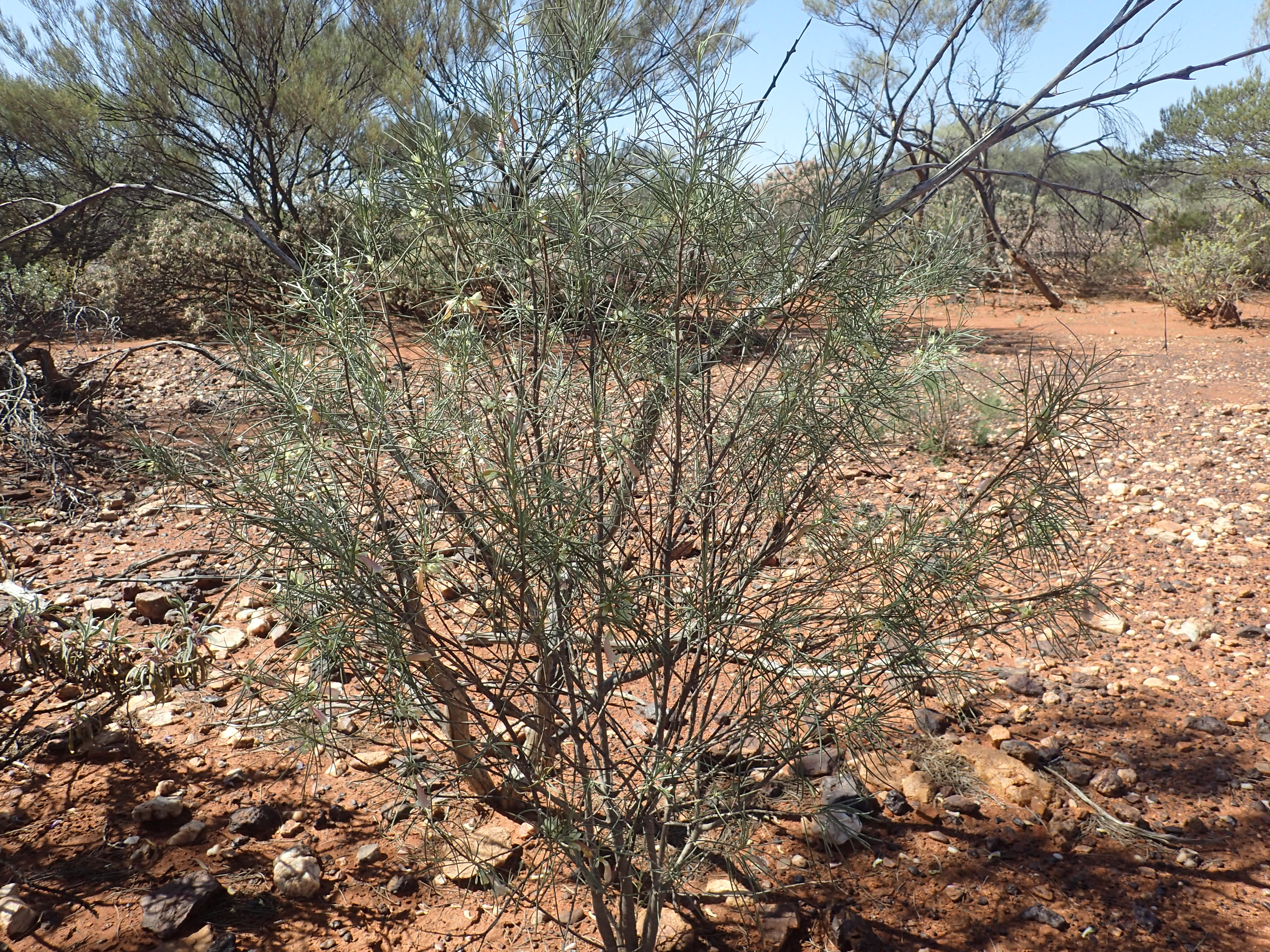
Subspecies angustifolia near Meekatharra

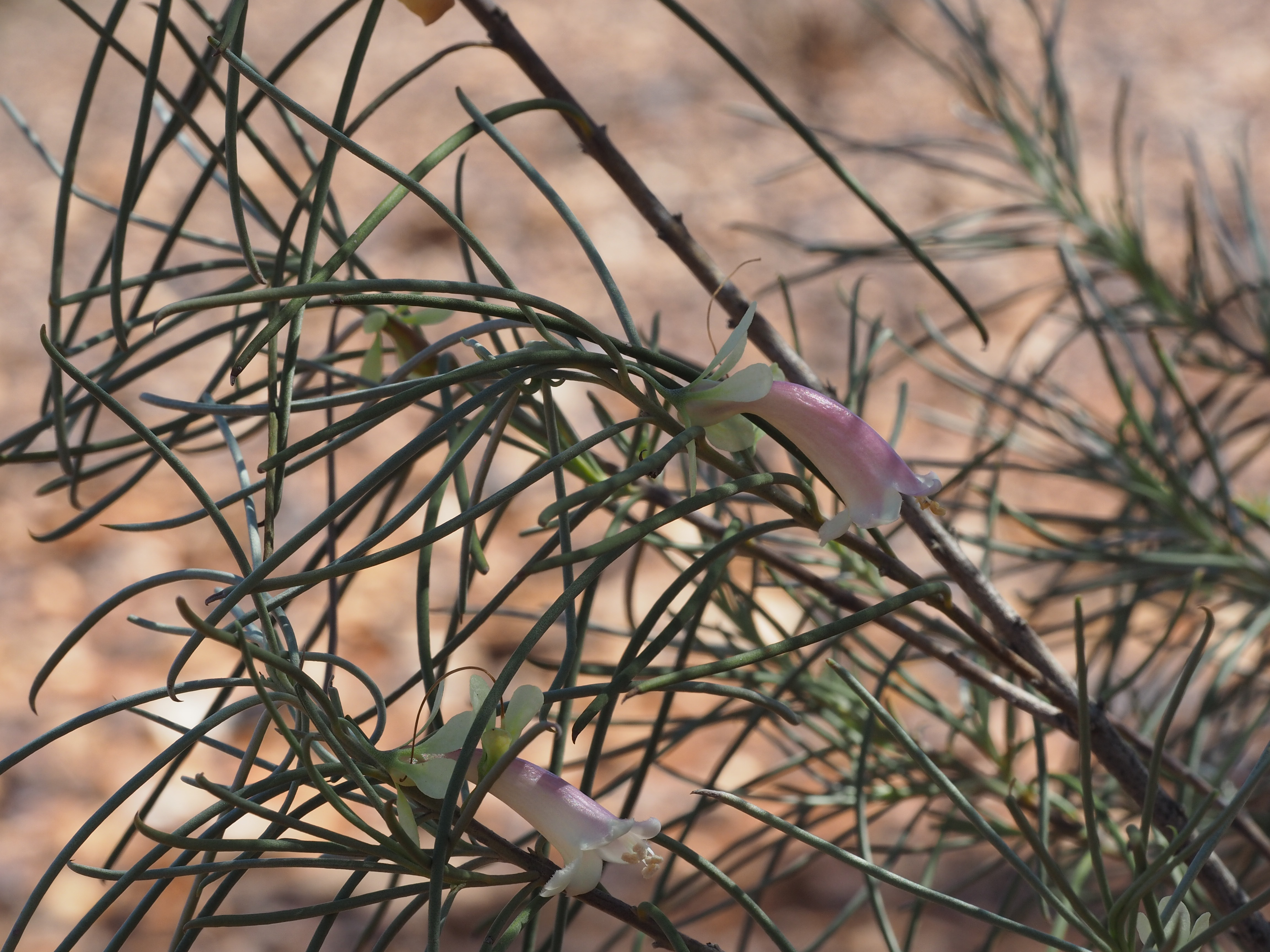
Subspecies angustifolia leaves and flowers

== Taxonomy and naming ==
The first formal description of this species was published by botanist Robert Brown in 1810 in Prodromus florae Novae Hollandiae. The specific epithet (oppositifolia) is derived from the Latin words oppositus meaning "on the other side" or "contrary" and folia meaning "leaves".

The names of three subspecies are accepted by the Australian Plant Census:

- Eremophila oppositifolia R.Br. subsp. oppositifolia has leaves that are almost cylindrical in shape, often flattened or channelled on the lower surface and 1–3 mm (0.04–0.1 in) wide;
- Eremophila oppositifolia subsp. angustifolia (S.Moore) Chinnock has leaves that are cylindrical in shape, not flat, firm, erect and 1–3 mm (0.04–0.1 in) wide;
- Eremophila oppositifolia subsp. rubra (C.T.White & W.D.Francis) Chinnock has leaves that are flat and 3–7 mm (0.1–0.3 in) wide.

== Distribution ==
Subspecies oppositifolia is widespread and common from the Eyre Peninsula and Gawler Ranges in South Australia eastwards to south-western New South Wales and north-western Victoria in clay-loam in woodland and shrubland. Subspecies angustifolia is widespread and common in Western Australia and in isolated locations in South Australia, growing in a range of soils in mulga and Eucalyptus woodland. Subspecies rubra is found from western Queensland to western and central New South Wales west of Condobolin, usually growing in woodland.

== Use in horticulture ==
This large eremophila has attractive foliage and the colourful sepals extend its flowering period. It is a good feature plant but can also be used as a windbreak or screening plant. Propagation from cuttings is easy and the shrub will grow in a wide range of soils, including clay in either full sun or partial shade. It will tolerate long droughts but occasional watering will help to ensure a good flowering season. Light frosts are tolerated without damage but heavy frosts may cause the loss of leaves.

== Conservation ==
Weeooka is classified as not threatened by the Western Australian Government Department of Parks and Wildlife.
