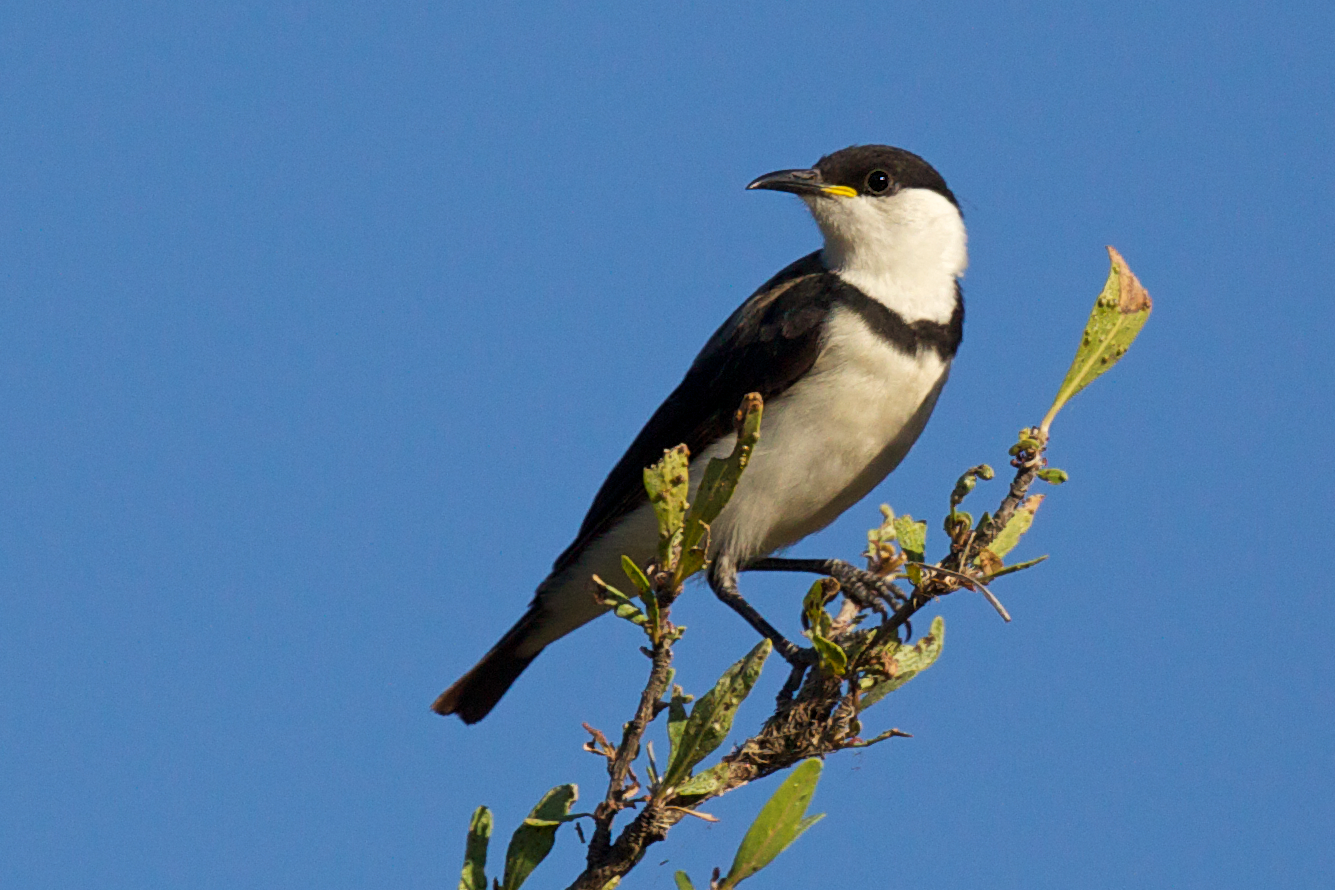

Conservation status
- Least Concern (IUCN 3.1)

Scientific classification
- Kingdom: Animalia
- Phylum: Chordata
- Class: Aves
- Order: Passeriformes
- Family: Meliphagidae
- Genus: Cissomela; Bonaparte, 1854
- Species: C. pectoralis

Binomial name
- Cissomela pectoralis (Gould, 1841)

Synonyms
- Certhionyx pectoralis

= Banded honeyeater =

Species of bird

The banded honeyeater (Cissomela pectoralis) is a species of honeyeater in the family Meliphagidae with a characteristic narrow black band across its white underparts. It is endemic to tropical northern Australia.

== Taxonomy and systematics ==
The scientific name for the banded honeyeater is Cissomela pectoralis (Gould, 1841). The holotype was Holotype ANSP 18224 male, Australia: north coast, held in the Academy of Natural Sciences of Drexel University, Philadelphia.

The banded honeyeater was previously placed in the genus Certhionyx, but was moved to the monotypic genus Cissomela after a molecular phylogenetic analysis, published in 2011, showed that the original genus was polyphyletic.

The genus name Cissomela (Bonaparte, 1854) means "honey magpie" from the Greek kissa for 'magpie', thus referring to the black and white colouring, and mela meaning 'honey' for its feeding habits. The specific epithet pectoralis comes from the Latin pectoris for 'breast', referring to the distinctive banded breast of this bird.

== Description ==
The banded honeyeater is a small, pied honeyeater with a distinctive black breast band across white underparts. It has a black back, tail and head, a long curved bill and long legs.

It has a wingspan of 12–14 cm (4.7–5.5 in), the bill measures 14–18 mm (0.6–0.7 in), the body length is 11.5–13.5 cm (4.5–5.3 in) and it weighs 8–13 g (0.3–0.5 oz).

== Behaviour and ecology ==
The IUCN Red List rating, the Northern Territory Conservation Status and Queensland Conservation Status for this species is Least Concern (LC).

The banded honeyeater inhabits tropical grassy woodland, open forests, mangroves and Melaleuca swamps. It feeds on the nectar of eucalypts and some other open flowers, such as Grevilleas, paperbarks and Bauhinias, plus insects. It usually moves in pairs or small groups, but large groups can gather when blossom is plentiful. It is a blossom nomad or can have seasonal movements in various parts of its range, which is restricted to tropical northern Australia.

== Gallery ==
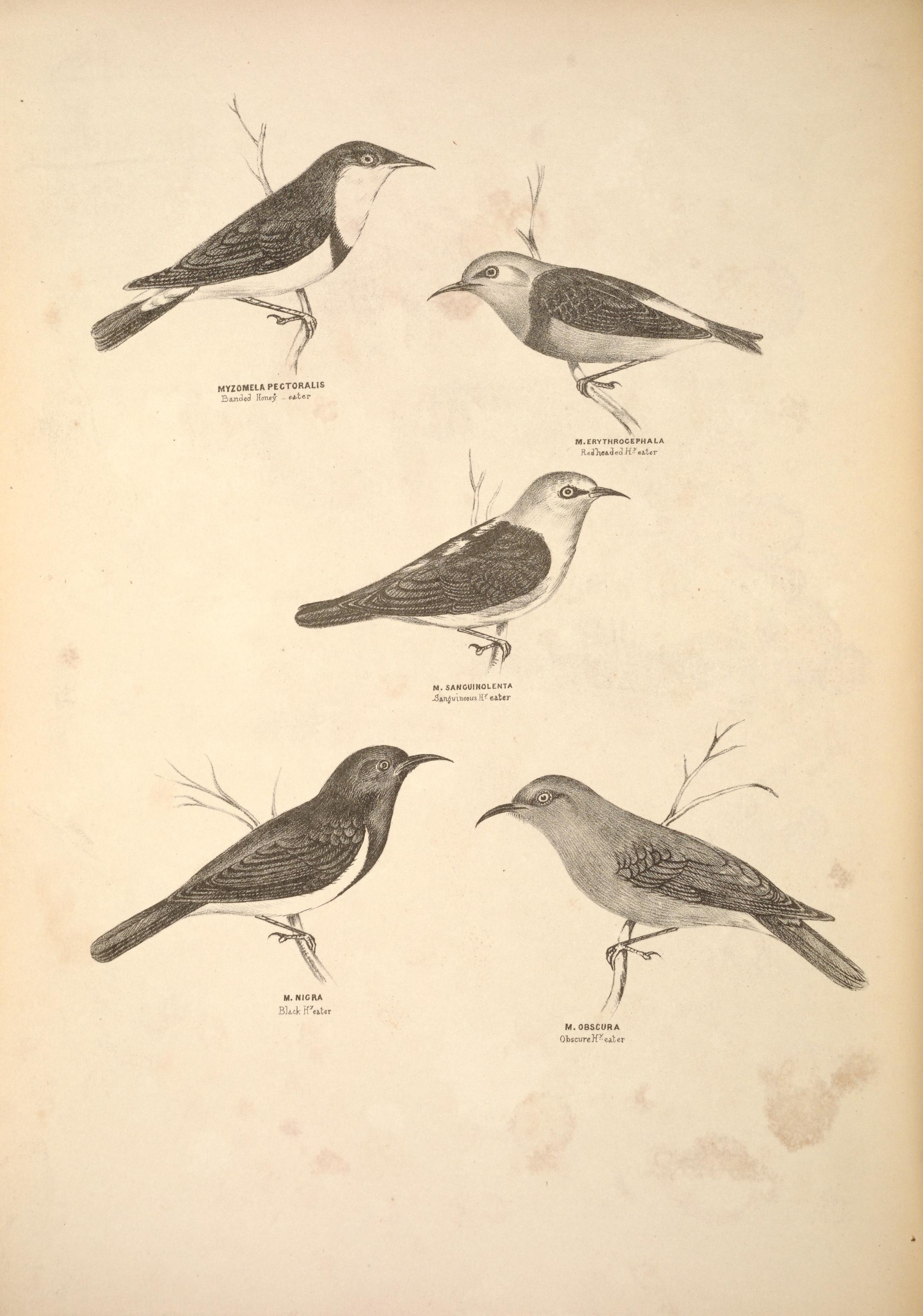
Illustration of five Meliphagidae species from the Companion to Gould's Handbook; banded honeyeater top left

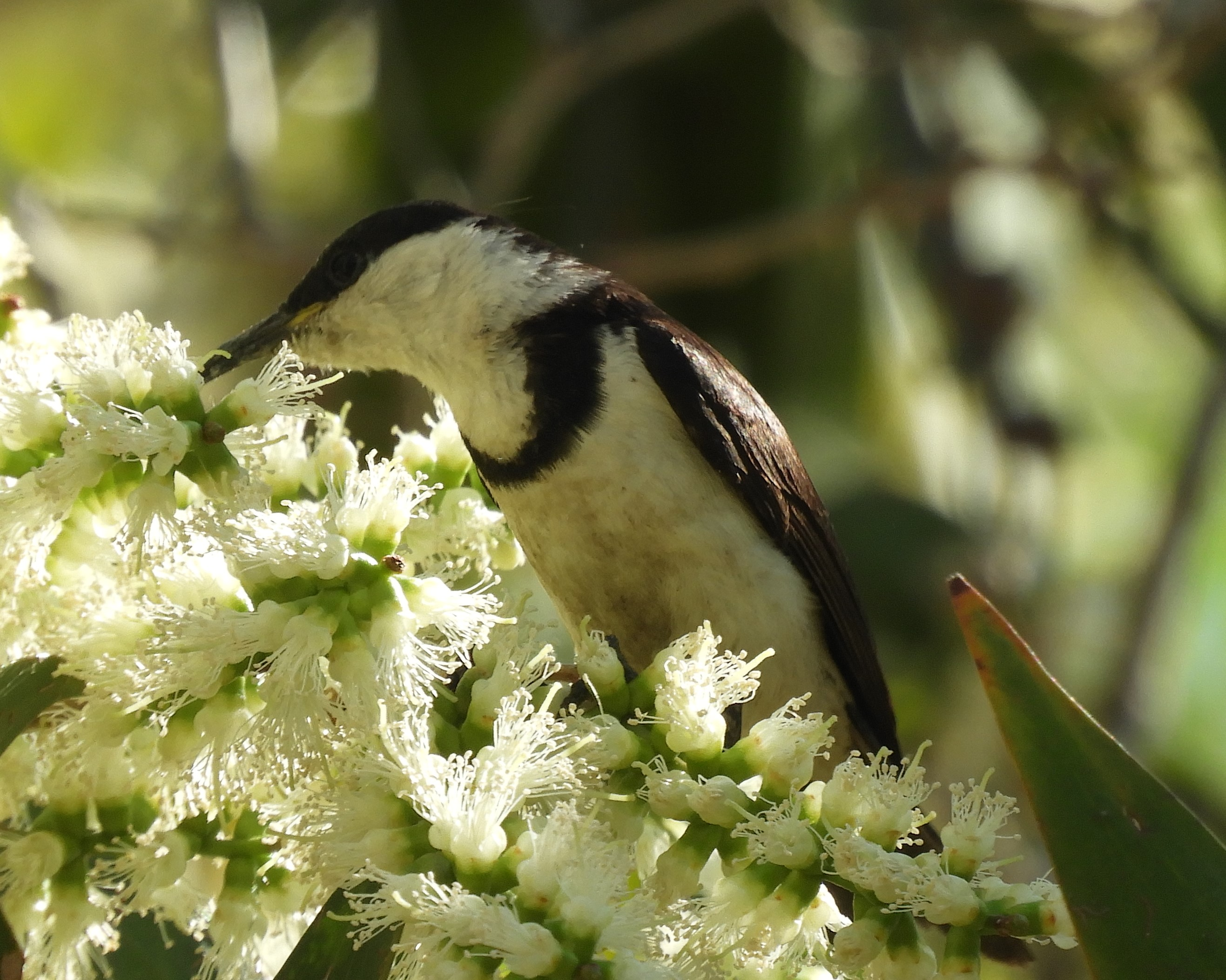
Banded honeyeater, Parry's Lagoon near Wyndham, WA, 2019
