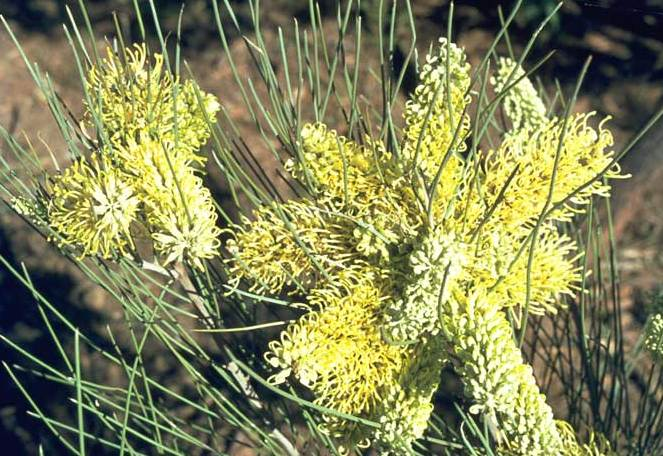
- Hakea lorea growing near Gascoyne Junction

Scientific classification
- Kingdom: Plantae
- Clade: Tracheophytes
- Clade: Angiosperms
- Clade: Eudicots
- Order: Proteales
- Family: Proteaceae
- Genus: Hakea
- Species: H. lorea

Binomial name
- Hakea lorea R.Br.
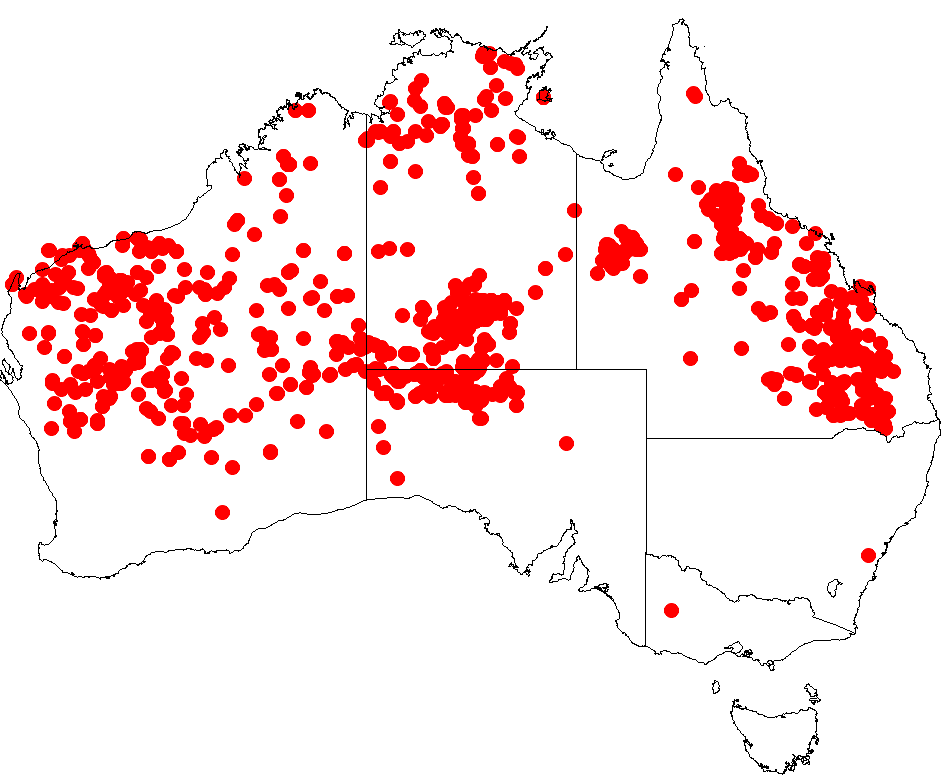
- Occurrence data from AVH

= Hakea lorea =

Bootlace oak

Species of shrub native to Australia

Hakea lorea, commonly known as bootlace oak or cork tree, is a species of shrub or small tree in the family Proteaceae found in central and northern Australia. It has needle-shaped leaves, yellow, white or green flowers and hard corky bark.

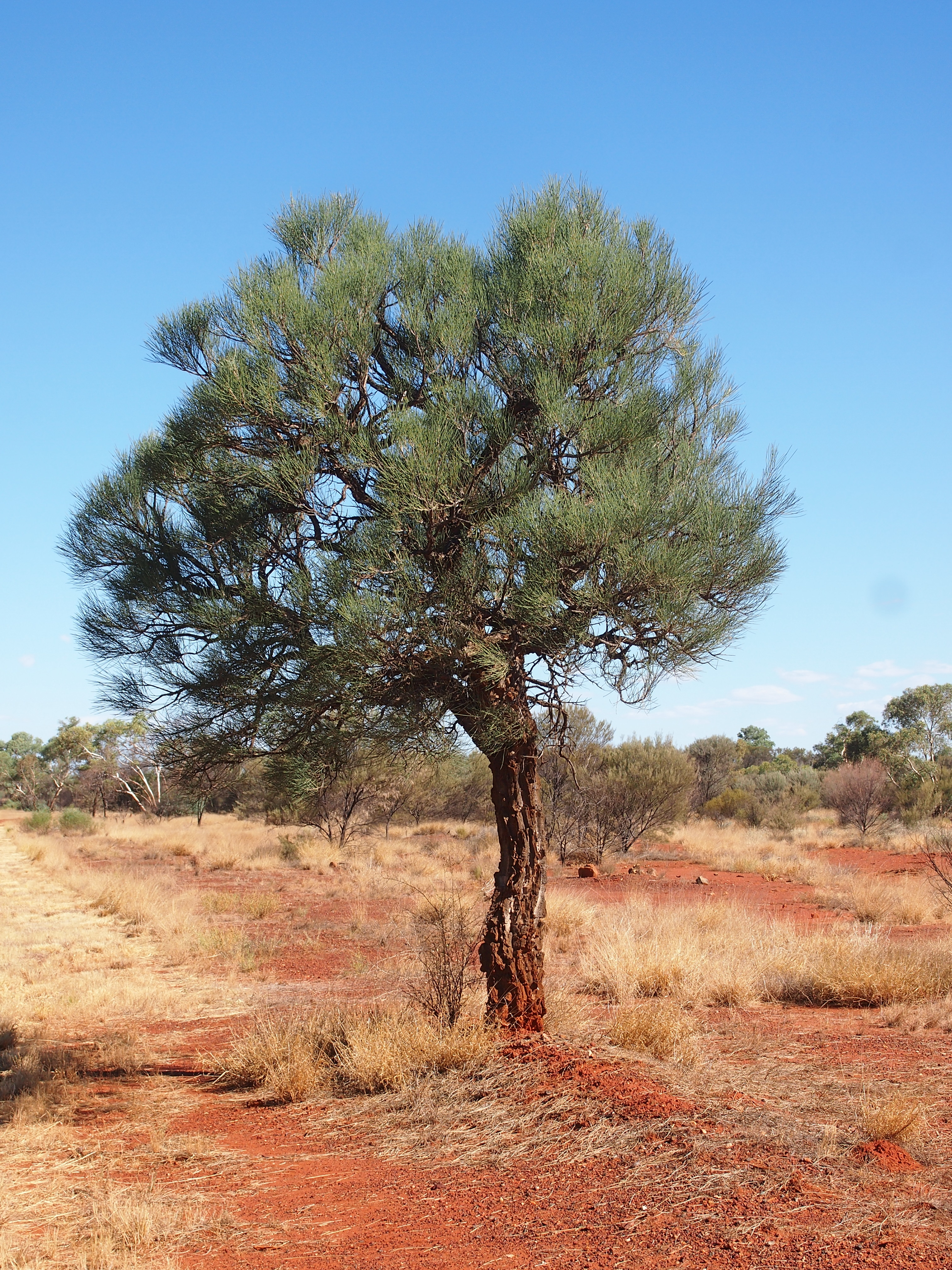
Hakea lorea habit

== Description ==
Hakea lorea grows as a gnarled tree to a height of 10 metres (33 ft), or as a shrub that is 1 to 5 m (3 to 16 ft) high and forms a lignotuber. The branchlet and leaves are thickly covered either in flattened, soft, silky hairs or woolly short, soft, matted hairs. The hairs more or less remain but eventually, the branchlets become smooth. The trunk bears thick cork like bark with many furrows. The needle-shaped leaves are either single or forked, and measure 15 to 70 centimetres (6 to 28 in) long, 1 to 2.5 millimetres (0.039 to 0.098 in) wide and may be upright or drooping. The inflorescence consists of 15 to 200 individual small yellow, white or green flowers. Flowering occurs mostly from April to September. The rachis is usually 50–250 mm (2.0–9.8 in) long, thickly covered with short, soft, silky hairs. The perianth is 5–12 mm (0.20–0.47 in) long, the pistil 15–33 mm (0.59–1.30 in) long and both covered with soft, short hairs. The fruit are 2.5–5.4 cm (0.98–2.13 in) long, 0.9–2.8 cm (0.35–1.10 in) wide with a long, curved, tapering beak.

== Taxonomy and naming ==
The species was first formally described by Robert Brown as Grevillea lorea in 1810 in Prodromus Florae Novae Hollandiae et Insulae Van Diemen after being collected in Shoalwater Bay, Queensland in September 1802, before reclassifying it in the genus Hakea in 1830, in his Supplementum primum prodromi florae Novae Hollandiae. Its name lorea is derived from Latin "made from thin strips of leather" and relates to its leaves. It belongs to a group of related species known as the corkbarks, or lorea group, within the genus Hakea, most of which are found across Australia's arid interior. Two subspecies are currently recognised. The nominate subspecies lorea is found over much of central and northern Australia, while the subspecies borealis is found in the Kimberley and northern Northern Territory. The species as it currently stands includes four species described over central and northern Australia which have been found to blend into one another evenly H. lorea, H. suberea, H. cunninghamii and the Queensland populations of H. fraseri (note that one remaining rare population of Hakea fraseri in New South Wales is considered a valid species).

== Distribution and habitat ==
Cork tree ranges across the interior of central and northern Australia, from the southern Cape York Peninsula in the northeast, south to the Darling Downs in the southeast to northern South Australia and the Pilbara in the west.

It is a slow growing but attractive plant in cultivation, its leaves and bark a feature. Full sun and good drainage are helpful.
