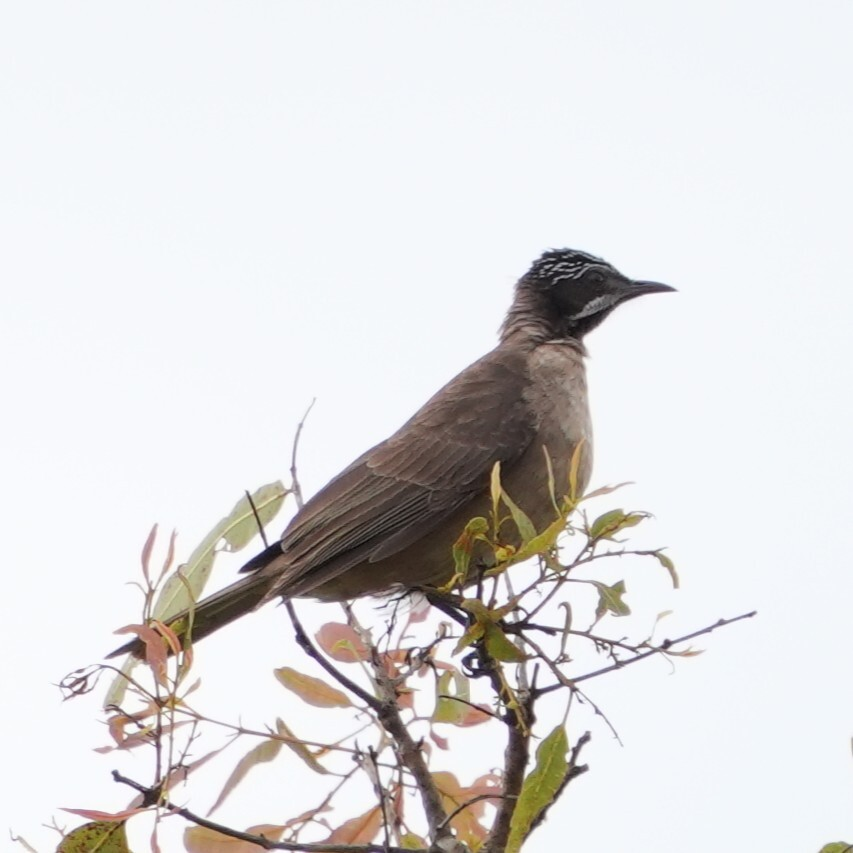

Conservation status
- Least Concern (IUCN 3.1)

Scientific classification
- Kingdom: Animalia
- Phylum: Chordata
- Class: Aves
- Order: Passeriformes
- Family: Meliphagidae
- Genus: Pycnopygius; Salvadori, 1880
- Species: P. stictocephalus

Binomial name
- Pycnopygius stictocephalus (Salvadori, 1876)

= Streak-headed honeyeater =

Species of bird

The streak-headed honeyeater (Pycnopygius stictocephalus) is a species of bird in the honeyeater family Meliphagidae. It is the only species placed in the genus Pycnopygius. It is found in Indonesia and Papua New Guinea where its natural habitat is subtropical or tropical moist lowland forests.
