= List of birds of the Torres Strait Islands =

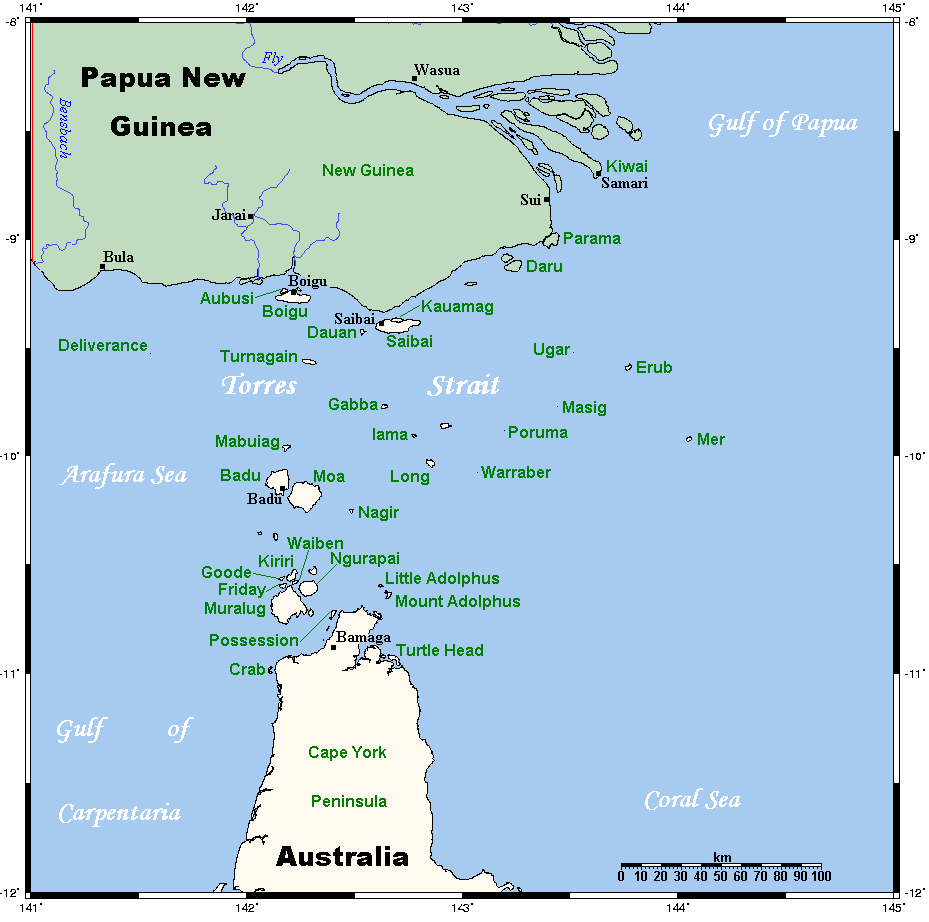
Islands of Torres Strait

The birds of the Torres Strait Islands are of particular interest to Australian birders because the islands are home to, and visited by, birds which some are New Guinea species. A number of islands are found in Australia, but a few are found in Papua New Guinea.

== Access ==
Access to these islands is not easy. Permission to visit is required from the island councils. The few birders who visit, do so on pre-organised trips by chartered yacht or, occasionally, on day-trips by chartered light aircraft. Saibai and Boigu have airstrips.

== List of birds ==
The following list is annotated with initials indicating which species have been recorded. Because these islands have not been thoroughly surveyed or regularly monitored by birders, it is very likely that the list underestimates the number of species breeding on or visiting them.

This list's taxonomic treatment (designation and sequence of orders, families and species) and nomenclature (common and scientific names) follow the conventions of The Clements Checklist of Birds of the World, 2022 edition. The family accounts at the beginning of each heading reflect this taxonomy, as do the species counts in each family account. Introduced and accidental species are included in the total counts for Torres Strait Islands.

The following tags have been used to highlight several categories. The commonly occurring native species do not fall into any of these categories:

- (A) Accidental - a species that rarely or accidentally occurs in the Torres Strait Islands.
- (I) Introduced - a species introduced to the Torres Strait Islands as a consequence, direct or indirect, of human actions

== Cassowaries and emu ==
Order: Struthioniformes Family: Casuariidae

The cassowaries are large flightless birds native to Australia and New Guinea.

- Southern cassowary, Casuarius casuarius
- Emu, Dromaius novaehollandiae

== Magpie goose ==
Order: Anseriformes Family: Anseranatidae

The family contains a single species, the magpie goose. It was an early and distinctive offshoot of the anseriform family tree, diverging after the screamers and before all other ducks, geese and swans, sometime in the late Cretaceous.

- Magpie goose, Anseranas semipalmata

== Ducks, geese, and waterfowl ==
Order: Anseriformes Family: Anatidae

Anatidae includes the ducks and most duck-like waterfowl, such as geese and swans. These birds are adapted to an aquatic existence with webbed feet, flattened bills, and feathers that are excellent at shedding water due to an oily coating.

- Spotted whistling-duck, Dendrocygna guttata
- Plumed whistling-duck, Dendrocygna eytoni
- Wandering whistling-duck, Dendrocygna arcuata
- Black swan, Cygnus atratus
- Radjah shelduck, Radjah radjah
- Green pygmy-goose, Nettapus pulchellus
- Garganey, Spatula querquedula
- Pacific black duck, Anas superciliosa
- Gray teal, Anas gracilis
- Chestnut teal, Anas castanea
- Pink-eared duck, Malacorhynchus membranaceus
- Hardhead, Aythya australis

== Megapodes ==
Order: Galliformes Family: Megapodiidae

The Megapodiidae are stocky, medium-large chicken-like birds with small heads and large feet. All but the malleefowl occupy jungle habitats and most have brown or black colouring.

- Yellow-legged brushturkey, Talegalla fuscirostris
- Australian brushturkey, Alectura lathami
- Orange-footed scrubfowl, Megapodius reinwardt

== Pheasants, grouse, and allies ==
Order: Galliformes Family: Phasianidae

The Phasianidae are a family of terrestrial birds. In general, they are plump (although they vary in size) and have broad, relatively short wings.

- Brown quail, Synoicus ypsilophorus
- Blue-breasted quail, Synoicus chinensis

== Grebes ==
Order: Podicipediformes Family: Podicipedidae

Grebes are small to medium-large freshwater diving birds. They have lobed toes and are excellent swimmers and divers. However, they have their feet placed far back on the body, making them quite ungainly on land.

- Australasian grebe, Tachybaptus novaehollandiae

== Pigeons and doves ==
Order: Columbiformes Family: Columbidae

Pigeons and doves are stout-bodied birds with short necks and short slender bills with a fleshy cere.

- Rock pigeon, Columba livia
- Amboyna cuckoo-dove, Macropygia amboinensis
- Brown cuckoo-dove, Macropygia phasianella
- Asian emerald dove, Chalcophaps longirostris
- Pacific emerald dove, Chalcophaps longirostris
- Stephan's dove, Chalcophaps stephani
- New Guinea bronzewing, Henicophaps albifrons
- Diamond dove, Geopelia cuneata
- Peaceful dove, Geopelia striata
- Bar-shouldered dove, Geopelia humeralis
- Cinnamon ground dove, Gallicolumba rufigula
- Thick-billed ground-pigeon, Trugon terrestris
- Sclater's crowned-pigeon, Goura sclaterii
- Wompoo fruit-dove, Ptilinopus magnificus
- Pink-spotted fruit-dove, Ptilinopus perlatus
- Orange-fronted fruit-dove, Ptilinopus aurantiifrons
- Superb fruit-dove, Ptilinopus superbus
- Rose-crowned fruit-dove, Ptilinopus regina
- Coroneted fruit-dove, Ptilinopus coronulatus
- Orange-bellied fruit-dove, Ptilinopus iozonus
- Pacific imperial-pigeon, Ducula pacifica
- Purple-tailed imperial-pigeon, Ducula rufigaster
- Island imperial-pigeon, Ducula pistrinaria
- Pinon's imperial-pigeon, Ducula pinon
- Collared imperial-pigeon, Ducula mullerii
- Zoe's imperial-pigeon, Ducula zoeae
- Pied imperial-pigeon, Ducula bicolor
- Torresian imperial-pigeon, Ducula spilorrhoa
- Topknot pigeon, Lopholaimus antarcticus

== Bustards ==
Order: Otidiformes Family: Otididae

Bustards are large terrestrial birds mainly associated with dry open country and steppes in the Old World. They are omnivorous and nest on the ground. They walk steadily on strong legs and big toes, pecking for food as they go. They have long broad wings with "fingered" wingtips and striking patterns in flight. Many have interesting mating displays.

- Australian bustard, Ardeotis australis

== Cuckoos ==
Order: Cuculiformes Family: Cuculidae

The family Cuculidae includes cuckoos, roadrunners and anis. These birds are of variable size with slender bodies, long tails and strong legs. The Old World cuckoos are brood parasites.

- Greater black coucal, Centropus menbeki
- Lesser black coucal, Centropus bernsteini
- Pheasant coucal, Centropus phasianinus
- Dwarf koel, Microdynamis parva
- Asian koel, Eudynamys scolopaceus
- Pacific koel, Eudynamys orientalis
- Channel-billed cuckoo, Scythrops novaehollandiae
- Horsfield's bronze-cuckoo, Chrysococcyx basalis
- Black-eared cuckoo, Chrysococcyx osculans
- Shining bronze-cuckoo, Chrysococcyx lucidus
- Little bronze-cuckoo, Chrysococcyx minutillus
- Pallid cuckoo, Cacomantis pallidus
- Chestnut-breasted cuckoo, Cacomantis castaneiventris
- Fan-tailed cuckoo, Cacomantis flabelliformis
- Brush cuckoo, Cacomantis variolosus
- Himalayan cuckoo, Cuculus saturatus
- Oriental cuckoo, Cuculus optatus

== Frogmouths ==
Order: Caprimulgiformes Family: Podargidae

The frogmouths are a group of nocturnal birds related to the nightjars. They are named for their large flattened hooked bill and huge frog-like gape, which they use to take insects.

- Tawny frogmouth, Podargus strigoides
- Marbled frogmouth, Podargus ocellatus
- Papuan frogmouth, Podargus papuensis

== Nightjars and allies ==
Order: Caprimulgiformes Family: Caprimulgidae

Nightjars are medium-sized nocturnal birds that usually nest on the ground. They have long wings, short legs and very short bills. Most have small feet, of little use for walking, and long pointed wings. Their soft plumage is camouflaged to resemble bark or leaves.

- Spotted nightjar, Eurostopodus argus
- White-throated nightjar, Eurostopodus mystacalis
- Papuan nightjar, Eurostopodus papuensis
- Large-tailed nightjar, Caprimulgus macrurus

== Owlet-nightjars ==
Order: Caprimulgiformes Family: Aegothelidae

The owlet-nightjars are small nocturnal birds related to the nightjars and frogmouths. They are insectivores which hunt mostly in the air. Their soft plumage is a mixture of browns and paler shades.

- Australian owlet-nightjar, Aegotheles cristatus
- Barred owlet-nightjar, Aegotheles bennettii

== Swifts ==
Order: Caprimulgiformes Family: Apodidae

Swifts are small birds which spend the majority of their lives flying. These birds have very short legs and never settle voluntarily on the ground, perching instead only on vertical surfaces. Many swifts have long swept-back wings which resemble a crescent or boomerang.

- Papuan spinetailed swift, Mearnsia novaeguineae
- White-throated needletail, Hirundapus caudacutus
- Glossy swiftlet, Collocalia esculenta
- Australian swiftlet, Aerodramus terraereginae
- Uniform swiftlet, Aerodramus vanikorensis
- Pacific swift, Apus pacificus
- House swift, Apus nipalensis (A)

== Rails, gallinules, and coots ==
Order: Gruiformes Family: Rallidae

Rallidae is a large family of small to medium-sized birds which includes the rails, crakes, coots and gallinules. Typically they inhabit dense vegetation in damp environments near lakes, swamps or rivers. In general they are shy and secretive birds, making them difficult to observe. Most species have strong legs and long toes which are well adapted to soft uneven surfaces. They tend to have short, rounded wings and to be weak fliers.

- Bare-eyed rail, Gymnocrex plumbeiventris
- Chestnut rail, Gallirallus castaneoventris
- Buff-banded rail, Gallirallus philippensis
- Dusky moorhen, Gallinula tenebrosa
- Eurasian coot, Fulica atra
- Australasian swamphen, Porphyrio melanotus
- Pale-vented bush-hen, Amaurornis moluccana
- White-browed crake, Poliolimnas cinereus
- Red-necked crake, Rallina tricolor
- Spotless crake, Zapornia tabuensis

== Cranes ==
Order: Gruiformes Family: Gruidae

Cranes are large, long-legged and long-necked birds. Unlike the similar-looking but unrelated herons, cranes fly with necks outstretched, not pulled back. Most have elaborate and noisy courting displays or "dances".

- Brolga, Antigone rubicunda

== Thick-knees ==
Order: Charadriiformes Family: Burhinidae

The thick-knees are a group of largely tropical waders in the family Burhinidae. They are found worldwide within the tropical zone, with some species also breeding in temperate Europe and Australia. They are medium to large waders with strong black or yellow-black bills, large yellow eyes and cryptic plumage. Despite being classed as waders, most species have a preference for arid or semi-arid habitats.

- Bush thick-knee, Burhinus grallarius
- Beach thick-knee, Esacus magnirostris

== Stilts and avocets ==
Order: Charadriiformes Family: Recurvirostridae

Recurvirostridae is a family of large wading birds, which includes the avocets and stilts. The avocets have long legs and long up-curved bills. The stilts have extremely long legs and long, thin straight bills.

- Pied stilt, Himantopus leucocephalus

== Oystercatchers ==
Order: Charadriiformes Family: Haematopodidae

The oystercatchers are large and noisy plover-like birds, with strong bills used for smashing or prising open molluscs.

- Pied oystercatcher, Haematopus longirostris
- Sooty oystercatcher, Haematopus fuliginosus

== Plovers and lapwings ==
Order: Charadriiformes Family: Charadriidae

The family Charadriidae includes the plovers, dotterels and lapwings. They are small to medium-sized birds with compact bodies, short, thick necks and long, usually pointed, wings. They are found in open country worldwide, mostly in habitats near water.

- Black-bellied plover, Pluvialis squatarola
- Pacific golden-plover, Pluvialis fulva
- Masked lapwing, Vanellus miles
- Lesser sand-plover, Charadrius mongolus
- Greater sand-plover, Charadrius leschenaultii
- Double-banded plover, Charadrius bicinctus
- Red-capped plover, Charadrius ruficapillus
- Oriental plover, Charadrius veredus
- Red-kneed dotterel, Erythrogonys cinctus
- Black-fronted dotterel, Elseyornis melanops

== Jacanas ==
Order: Charadriiformes Family: Jacanidae

The Jacanas are a group of tropical waders in the family Jacanidae. They are found throughout the tropics. They are identifiable by their huge feet and claws which enable them to walk on floating vegetation in the shallow lakes that are their preferred habitat.

- Comb-crested jacana, Irediparra gallinacea

== Sandpipers and allies ==
Order: Charadriiformes Family: Scolopacidae

Scolopacidae is a large diverse family of small to medium-sized shorebirds including the sandpipers, curlews, godwits, shanks, tattlers, woodcocks, snipes, dowitchers and phalaropes. The majority of these species eat small invertebrates picked out of the mud or soil. Variation in length of legs and bills enables multiple species to feed in the same habitat, particularly on the coast, without direct competition for food.

- Whimbrel, Numenius phaeopus
- Little curlew, Numenius minutus
- Far Eastern curlew, Numenius madagascariensis
- Bar-tailed godwit, Limosa lapponica
- Black-tailed godwit, Limosa limosa
- Ruddy turnstone, Arenaria interpres
- Great knot, Calidris tenuirostris
- Red knot, Calidris canutus
- Broad-billed sandpiper, Calidris falcinellus
- Sharp-tailed sandpiper, Calidris acuminata
- Curlew sandpiper, Calidris ferruginea
- Long-toed stint, Calidris subminuta
- Red-necked stint, Calidris ruficollis
- Sanderling, Calidris alba
- Pectoral sandpiper, Calidris melanotos
- Latham's snipe, Gallinago hardwickii
- Swinhoe's snipe, Gallinago megala
- Terek sandpiper, Xenus cinereus
- Red-necked phalarope, Phalaropus lobatus (A)
- Common sandpiper, Actitis hypoleucos
- Gray-tailed tattler, Tringa brevipes
- Wandering tattler, Tringa incana
- Common greenshank, Tringa nebularia
- Marsh sandpiper, Tringa stagnatilis
- Wood sandpiper, Tringa glareola
- Common redshank, Tringa totanus (A)

== Buttonquail ==
Order: Charadriiformes Family: Turnicidae

The buttonquail are small, drab, running birds which resemble the true quails. The female is the brighter of the sexes and initiates courtship. The male incubates the eggs and tends the young.

- Red-backed buttonquail, Turnix maculosa
- Red-chested buttonquail, Turnix pyrrhothorax

== Pratincoles and coursers ==
Order: Charadriiformes Family: Glareolidae

Glareolidae is a family of wading birds comprising the pratincoles, which have short legs, long pointed wings and long forked tails, and the coursers, which have long legs, short wings and long, pointed bills which curve downwards.

- Australian pratincole, Stiltia isabella
- Oriental pratincole, Glareola maldivarum

== Skuas and jaegers ==
Order: Charadriiformes Family: Stercorariidae

The family Stercorariidae are, in general, medium to large birds, typically with grey or brown plumage, often with white markings on the wings. They nest on the ground in temperate and arctic regions and are long-distance migrants.

- Pomarine jaeger, Stercorarius pomarinus

== Gulls, terns, and skimmers ==
Order: Charadriiformes Family: Laridae

Laridae is a family of medium to large seabirds, the gulls, terns, and skimmers. Gulls are typically grey or white, often with black markings on the head or wings. They have stout, longish bills and webbed feet. Terns are a group of generally medium to large seabirds typically with grey or white plumage, often with black markings on the head. Most terns hunt fish by diving but some pick insects off the surface of fresh water. Terns are generally long-lived birds, with several species known to live in excess of 30 years.

- Silver gull, Chroicocephalus novaehollandiae
- Black-headed gull, Chroicocephalus ridibundus (A)
- Brown noddy, Anous stolidus
- Black noddy, Anous minutus
- Lesser noddy, Anous tenuirostris
- White tern, Gygis alba
- Sooty tern, Onychoprion fuscatus
- Gray-backed tern, Onychoprion lunatus (A)
- Bridled tern, Onychoprion anaethetus
- Little tern, Sternula albifrons
- Gull-billed tern, Gelochelidon nilotica
- Caspian tern, Hydroprogne caspia
- White-winged tern, Chlidonias leucopterus
- Whiskered tern, Chlidonias hybrida
- Roseate tern, Sterna dougallii
- Black-naped tern, Sterna sumatrana
- Common tern, Sterna hirundo
- Great crested tern, Thalasseus bergii
- Lesser crested tern, Thalasseus bengalensis

== Tropicbirds ==
Order: Phaethontiformes Family: Phaethontidae

Tropicbirds are slender white birds of tropical oceans, with exceptionally long central tail feathers. Their heads and long wings have black markings.

- White-tailed tropicbird, Phaethon lepturus
- Red-tailed tropicbird, Phaethon rubricauda

== Southern storm-petrels ==
Order: Procellariiformes Family: Oceanitidae

The southern storm-petrels are relatives of the petrels and are the smallest seabirds. They feed on planktonic crustaceans and small fish picked from the surface, typically while hovering. The flight is fluttering and sometimes bat-like.

- Wilson's storm-petrel, Oceanites oceanicus
- White-faced storm-petrel, Pelagodroma marina
- White-bellied storm-petrel, Fregetta grallaria
- Black-bellied storm-petrel, Fregetta tropica

== Shearwaters and petrels ==
Order: Procellariiformes Family: Procellariidae

The procellariids are the main group of medium-sized "true petrels", characterised by united nostrils with medium septum and a long outer functional primary.

- Kermadec petrel, Pterodroma neglecta
- Gould's petrel, Pterodroma leucoptera
- Antarctic prion, Pachyptila turtur
- Tahiti petrel, Pseudobulweria rostrata
- Streaked shearwater, Calonectris leucomelas
- Flesh-footed shearwater, Ardenna carneipes
- Wedge-tailed shearwater, Ardenna pacificus
- Sooty shearwater, Ardenna griseus
- Short-tailed shearwater, Ardenna tenuirostris
- Little shearwater, Puffinus assimilis
- Christmas shearwater, Puffinus nativitatis
- Tropical shearwater, Puffinus bailloni

== Storks ==
Order: Ciconiiformes Family: Ciconiidae

Storks are large, long-legged, long-necked, wading birds with long, stout bills. Storks are mute, but bill-clattering is an important mode of communication at the nest. Their nests can be large and may be reused for many years. Many species are migratory.

- Black-necked stork, Ephippiorhynchus asiaticus

== Frigatebirds ==
Order: Suliformes Family: Fregatidae

Frigatebirds are large seabirds usually found over tropical oceans. They are large, black-and-white or completely black, with long wings and deeply forked tails. The males have coloured inflatable throat pouches. They do not swim or walk and cannot take off from a flat surface. Having the largest wingspan-to-body-weight ratio of any bird, they are essentially aerial, able to stay aloft for more than a week.

- Lesser frigatebird, Fregata ariel
- Great frigatebird, Fregata minor

== Boobies and gannets ==
Order: Suliformes Family: Sulidae

The sulids comprise the gannets and boobies. Both groups are medium to large coastal seabirds that plunge-dive for fish.

- Masked booby, Sula dactylatra
- Brown booby, Sula leucogaster
- Red-footed booby, Sula sula

== Anhingas ==
Order: Suliformes Family: Anhingidae

Anhingas or darters are often called "snake-birds" because of their long thin necks, which gives a snake-like appearance when they swim with their bodies submerged. The males have black and dark-brown plumage, an erectile crest on the nape and a larger bill than the female. The females have much paler plumage especially on the neck and underparts. The darters have completely webbed feet and their legs are short and set far back on the body. Their plumage is somewhat permeable, like that of cormorants, and they spread their wings to dry after diving.

- Australasian darter, Anhinga novaehollandiae

== Cormorants and shags ==
Order: Suliformes Family: Phalacrocoracidae

Phalacrocoracidae is a family of medium to large coastal, fish-eating seabirds that includes cormorants and shags. Plumage colouration varies, with the majority having mainly dark plumage, some species being black-and-white and a few being colourful.

- Little pied cormorant, Microcarbo melanoleucos
- Great cormorant, Phalacrocorax carbo
- Little black cormorant, Phalacrocorax sulcirostris
- Pied cormorant, Phalacrocorax varius

== Pelicans ==
Order: Pelecaniformes Family: Pelecanidae

Pelicans are large water birds with a distinctive pouch under their beak. As with other members of the order Pelecaniformes, they have webbed feet with four toes.

- Australian pelican, Pelecanus conspicillatus

== Herons, egrets, and bitterns ==
Order: Pelecaniformes Family: Ardeidae

The family Ardeidae contains the bitterns, herons and egrets. Herons and egrets are medium to large wading birds with long necks and legs. Bitterns tend to be shorter necked and more wary. Members of Ardeidae fly with their necks retracted, unlike other long-necked birds such as storks, ibises and spoonbills.

- Yellow bittern, Ixobrychus sinensis
- Black-backed bittern, Ixobrychus dubius
- Black bittern, Ixobrychus flavicollis
- Forest bittern, Zonerodius heliosylus
- Pacific heron, Ardea pacifica
- Great-billed heron, Ardea sumatrana
- Great egret, Ardea alba
- Intermediate egret, Ardea intermedia
- White-faced heron, Egretta novaehollandiae
- Little egret, Egretta garzetta
- Pacific reef-heron, Egretta sacra
- Pied heron, Egretta picata
- Cattle egret, Bubulcus ibis
- Striated heron, Butorides striata
- Nankeen night-heron, Nycticorax caledonicus

== Ibises and spoonbills ==
Order: Pelecaniformes Family: Threskiornithidae

Threskiornithidae is a family of large terrestrial and wading birds which includes the ibises and spoonbills. They have long, broad wings with 11 primary and about 20 secondary feathers. They are strong fliers and despite their size and weight, very capable soarers.

- Glossy ibis, Plegadis falcinellus
- Australian ibis, Threskiornis moluccus
- Straw-necked ibis, Threskiornis spinicollis
- Royal spoonbill, Platalea regia
- Yellow-billed spoonbill, Platalea flavipes

== Osprey ==
Order: Accipitriformes Family: Pandionidae

The family Pandionidae contains only one species, the osprey. The osprey is a medium-large raptor which is a specialist fish-eater with a worldwide distribution.

- Osprey, Pandion haliaetus

== Hawks, eagles, and kites ==
Order: Accipitriformes Family: Accipitridae

Accipitridae is a family of birds of prey, which includes hawks, eagles, kites, harriers and Old World vultures. These birds have powerful hooked beaks for tearing flesh from their prey, strong legs, powerful talons and keen eyesight.

- Black-shouldered kite, Elanus axillaris
- Black-breasted kite, Hamirostra melanosternon
- Long-tailed honey-buzzard, Henicopernis longicauda
- Square-tailed kite, Lophoictinia isura
- Pacific baza, Aviceda subcristata
- New Guinea eagle, Harpyopsis novaeguineae
- Little eagle, Hieraaetus morphnoides
- Pygmy eagle, Hieraaetus weiskei
- Gurney's eagle, Aquila gurneyi
- Wedge-tailed eagle, Aquila audax
- Papuan marsh-harrier, Circus spilothorax
- Swamp harrier, Circus approximans
- Spotted harrier, Circus assimilis
- Variable goshawk, Accipiter hiogaster
- Gray goshawk, Accipiter novaehollandiae
- Brown goshawk, Accipiter fasciatus
- Collared sparrowhawk, Accipiter cirrocephalus
- Doria's goshawk, Megatriorchis doriae
- Black kite, Milvus migrans
- Whistling kite, Haliastur sphenurus
- Brahminy kite, Haliastur indus
- White-bellied sea-eagle, Haliaeetus leucogaster

== Barn-owls ==
Order: Strigiformes Family: Tytonidae

Barn-owls are medium to large owls with large heads and characteristic heart-shaped faces. They have long strong legs with powerful talons.

- Sooty owl, Tyto tenebricosa
- Australian masked-owl, Tyto novaehollandiae
- Australasian grass-owl, Tyto longimembris
- Barn owl, Tyto alba

== Owls ==
Order: Strigiformes Family: Strigidae

The typical owls are small to large solitary nocturnal birds of prey. They have large forward-facing eyes and ears, a hawk-like beak and a conspicuous circle of feathers around each eye called a facial disk.

- Rufous owl, Ninox rufa
- Barking owl, Ninox connivens
- Southern boobook, Ninox boobook
- Morepork, Ninox novaeseelandiae

== Hornbills ==
Order: Bucerotiformes Family: Bucerotidae

Hornbills are a group of birds whose bill is shaped like a cow's horn, but without a twist, sometimes with a casque on the upper mandible. Frequently, the bill is brightly coloured.

- Blyth's hornbill, Rhyticeros plicatus

Blyth's hornbill is native to New Guinea and Indonesia. It is possibly found on Saibai Island and the Talbot Islands in the Torres Strait, and would be classified as an accidental, rarely encountered species to these islands. If recorded, this would classify it as Australia's only hornbill species.

== Kingfishers ==
Order: Coraciiformes Family: Alcedinidae

Kingfishers are medium-sized birds with large heads, long pointed bills, short legs, and stubby tails.

- Azure kingfisher, Ceyx azureus
- Little kingfisher, Ceyx pusillus
- Papuan dwarf-kingfisher, Ceyx pusillus
- Laughing kookaburra, Dacelo novaeguineae
- Blue-winged kookaburra, Dacelo leachii
- Rufous-bellied kookaburra, Dacelo gaudichaud
- Red-backed kingfisher, Todiramphus pyrrhopygius
- Blue-black kingfisher, Todiramphus nigrocyaneus
- Forest kingfisher, Todiramphus macleayii
- Torresian kingfisher, Todiramphus sordidus
- Sacred kingfisher, Todiramphus sanctus
- Collared kingfisher, Todiramphus chloris
- Hook-billed kingfisher, Melidora macrorrhina
- Yellow-billed kingfisher, Syma torotoro
- Common paradise-kingfisher, Tanysiptera galatea
- Little paradise-kingfisher, Tanysiptera hydrocharis (A)
- Buff-breasted paradise-kingfisher, Tanysiptera sylvia

== Bee-eaters ==
Order: Coraciiformes Family: Meropidae

The bee-eaters are a group of coraciiform birds in the family Meropidae. Most species are found in Africa but others occur in southern Europe, Madagascar, Australia and New Guinea. They are characterised by richly coloured plumage, slender bodies and usually elongated central tail feathers. All are colourful and have long downturned bills and pointed wings, which give them a swallow-like appearance when seen from afar.

- Blue-tailed bee-eater, Merops philippinus
- Rainbow bee-eater, Merops ornatus

== Rollers ==
Order: Coraciiformes Family: Coraciidae

Rollers resemble crows in size and build, but are more closely related to the kingfishers and bee-eaters. They share the colourful appearance of those groups with blues and browns predominating. The two inner front toes are connected, but the outer toe is not.

- Dollarbird, Eurystomus orientalis

== Falcons and caracaras ==
Order: Falconiformes Family: Falconidae

Falconidae is a family of diurnal birds of prey. They differ from hawks, eagles and kites in that they kill with their beaks instead of their talons.

- Nankeen kestrel, Falco cenchroides
- Oriental hobby, Falco severus
- Australian hobby, Falco longipennis
- Brown falcon, Falco berigora
- Black falcon, Falco subniger
- Peregrine falcon, Falco peregrinus

== Cockatoos ==
Order: Psittaciformes Family: Cacatuidae

The cockatoos share many features with other parrots including the characteristic curved beak shape and a zygodactyl foot, with two forward toes and two backwards toes. They differ, however in a number of characteristics, including the often spectacular movable headcrest.

- Palm cockatoo, Probosciger aterrimus
- Red-tailed black-cockatoo, Calyptorhynchus banksii
- Sulphur-crested cockatoo, Cacatua galerita

== Old World parrots ==
Order: Psittaciformes Family: Psittaculidae

Characteristic features of parrots include a strong curved bill, an upright stance, strong legs, and clawed zygodactyl feet. Many parrots are vividly coloured, and some are multi-coloured. In size they range from 8 cm (3.1 in) to 1 m (3.3 ft) in length. Old World parrots are found from Africa east across south and southeast Asia and Oceania to Australia and New Zealand.

- Red-winged parrot, Aprosmictus erythropterus
- Eclectus parrot, Eclectus roratus
- Red-cheeked parrot, Geoffroyus geoffroyi
- Pale-headed rosella, Platycercus adscitus
- Orange-breasted fig-parrot, Cyclopsitta gulielmitertii
- Double-eyed fig-parrot, Cyclopsitta diophthalma
- Large fig-parrot, Psittaculirostris desmarestii
- Red-flanked lorikeet, Charmosyna placentis
- Yellow-streaked lory, Chalcopsitta scintillata
- Black-capped lory, Lorius lory
- Dusky lory, Pseudeos fuscata
- Coconut lorikeet, Trichoglossus haematodus
- Rainbow lorikeet, Trichoglossus moluccanus
- Scaly-breasted lorikeet, Trichoglossus chlorolepidotus

== Pittas ==
Order: Passeriformes Family: Pittidae

Pittas are medium-sized by passerine standards and are stocky, with fairly long, strong legs, short tails and stout bills. Many are brightly coloured. They spend the majority of their time on wet forest floors, eating snails, insects and similar invertebrates.

- Papuan pitta, Erythropitta macklotii
- Hooded pitta, Pitta sordida
- Noisy pitta, Pitta versicolor

== Bowerbirds ==
Order: Passeriformes Family: Ptilonorhynchidae

The bowerbirds are small to medium-sized passerine birds. The males notably build a bower to attract a mate. Depending on the species, the bower ranges from a circle of cleared earth with a small pile of twigs in the center to a complex and highly decorated structure of sticks and leaves.

- Black-capped catbird, Ailuroedus melanocephalus
- Great bowerbird, Chlamydera nuchalis
- Fawn-breasted bowerbird, Chlamydera cerviniventris

== Australasian treecreepers ==
Order: Passeriformes Family: Climacteridae

The Climacteridae are medium-small, mostly brown-coloured birds with patterning on their underparts. They are endemic to Australia and New Guinea.

- Brown treecreeper, Climacteris picumnus

== Fairywrens ==
Order: Passeriformes Family: Maluridae

Maluridae is a family of small, insectivorous passerine birds endemic to Australia and New Guinea. They are socially monogamous and sexually promiscuous, meaning that although they form pairs between one male and one female, each partner will mate with other individuals and even assist in raising the young from such pairings.

- Wallace's fairywren, Sipodotus wallacii
- Lovely fairywren, Malurus amabilis
- Red-backed fairywren, Malurus melanocephalus
- Emperor fairywren, Malurus cyanocephalus
- White-shouldered fairywren, Malurus alboscapulatus

== Honeyeaters ==
Order: Passeriformes Family: Meliphagidae

The honeyeaters are a large and diverse family of small to medium-sized birds most common in Australia and New Guinea. They are nectar feeders and closely resemble other nectar-feeding passerines.

- Streak-headed honeyeater, Pycnopygius stictocephalus
- Puff-backed honeyeater, Meliphaga aruensis
- Yellow-spotted honeyeater, Meliphaga notata
- Mimic honeyeater, Microptilotis analogus
- Yellow-gaped honeyeater, Microptilotis flavirictus
- Graceful honeyeater, Microptilotis gracilis
- Yellow honeyeater, Stomiopera flava
- White-gaped honeyeater, Stomiopera unicolor
- Yellow-throated miner, Manorina flavigula
- Varied honeyeater, Gavicalis versicolor
- Brown-backed honeyeater, Ramsayornis modestus
- Bar-breasted honeyeater, Ramsayornis fasciatus
- Rufous-banded honeyeater, Conopophila albogularis
- Rufous-throated honeyeater, Conopophila rufogularis
- Long-billed honeyeater, Melilestes megarhynchus
- Ruby-throated myzomela, Myzomela eques
- Dusky myzomela, Myzomela obscura
- Papuan black myzomela, Myzomela nigrita
- Red-headed myzomela, Myzomela erythrocephala
- Scarlet myzomela, Myzomela sanguinolenta
- Green-backed honeyeater, Glycichaera fallax
- Banded honeyeater, Cissomela pectoralis
- Brown honeyeater, Lichmera indistincta
- White-streaked honeyeater, Trichodere cockerelli
- Blue-faced honeyeater, Entomyzon cyanotis
- White-throated honeyeater, Melithreptus albogularis
- Tawny-breasted honeyeater, Xanthotis flaviventer
- Spotted honeyeater, Xanthotis polygrammus
- Little friarbird, Philemon citreogularis
- Helmeted friarbird, Philemon buceroides
- Silver-crowned friarbird, Philemon argenticeps
- Noisy friarbird, Philemon corniculatus

== Pardalotes ==
Order: Passeriformes Family: Pardalotidae

Pardalotes spend most of their time high in the outer foliage of trees, feeding on insects, spiders, and above all lerps (a type of sap-sucking insect).

- Red-browed pardalote, Pardalotus rubricatus
- Striated pardalote, Pardalotus striatus

== Thornbills and allies ==
Order: Passeriformes Family: Acanthizidae

Thornbills are small passerine birds, similar in habits to the tits.

- Tropical scrubwren, Sericornis beccarii
- Large scrubwren, Sericornis nouhuysi
- Weebill, Smicrornis brevirostris
- Green-backed gerygone, Gerygone chloronota
- Fairy gerygone, Gerygone palpebrosa
- Yellow-bellied gerygone, Gerygone chrysogaster
- White-throated gerygone, Gerygone olivacea
- Large-billed gerygone, Gerygone magnirostris
- Mangrove gerygone, Gerygone levigaster

== Pseudo-babblers ==
Order: Passeriformes Family: Pomatostomidae

The pseudo-babblers are small to medium-sized birds endemic to Australia and New Guinea. They are ground-feeding omnivores and highly social.

- Papuan babbler, Pomatostomus isidorei
- Gray-crowned babbler, Pomatostomus temporalis

== Quail-thrushes and jewel-babblers ==
Order: Passeriformes Family: Cinclosomatidae

The Cinclosomatidae is a family containing jewel-babblers and quail-thrushes.

- Painted quail-thrush, Cinclosoma ajax

== Cuckooshrikes ==
Order: Passeriformes Family: Campephagidae

The cuckooshrikes are small to medium-sized passerine birds. They are predominantly greyish with white and black, although some species are brightly coloured.

- Barred cuckooshrike, Coracina lineata
- Boyer's cuckooshrike, Coracina boyeri
- Black-faced cuckooshrike, Coracina novaehollandiae
- White-bellied cuckooshrike, Coracina papuensis
- White-winged triller, Lalage sueurii
- Varied triller, Lalage leucomela
- Common cicadabird, Edolisoma tenuirostre
- Black cicadabird, Edolisoma melas

== Sittellas ==
Order: Passeriformes Family: Neosittidae

The sittellas are a family of small passerine birds found only in Australasia. They resemble treecreepers, but have soft tails.

- Papuan sittella, Daphoenositta papuensis
- Varied sittella, Daphoenositta chrysoptera

== Whistlers and allies ==
Order: Passeriformes Family: Pachycephalidae

The family Pachycephalidae includes the whistlers, shrikethrushes, and some of the pitohuis.

- Rusty pitohui, Pseudorectes ferrugineus
- Gray shrikethrush, Colluricincla harmonica
- Little shrikethrush, Colluricincla megarhyncha
- Baliem whistler, Pachycephala balim
- Black-tailed whistler, Pachycephala melanura
- Gray whistler, Pachycephala simplex
- Rufous whistler, Pachycephala rufiventris
- White-breasted whistler, Pachycephala lanioides

== Old World orioles ==
Order: Passeriformes Family: Oriolidae

The Old World orioles are colourful passerine birds. They are not related to the New World orioles.

- Brown oriole, Oriolus szalayi
- Olive-backed oriole, Oriolus sagittatus
- Green oriole, Oriolus flavocinctus
- Australasian figbird, Sphecotheres vieilloti

== Boatbills ==
Order: Passeriformes Family: Machaerirhynchidae

The boatbills have affinities to woodswallows and butcherbirds, and are distributed across New Guinea and northern Queensland.

- Yellow-breasted boatbill, Machaerirhynchus flaviventer

== Woodswallows, bellmagpies, and allies ==
Order: Passeriformes Family: Artamidae

The woodswallows are soft-plumaged, somber-coloured passerine birds. They are smooth, agile flyers with moderately large, semi-triangular wings. The cracticids: currawongs, bellmagpies and butcherbirds, are similar to the other corvids. They have large, straight bills and mostly black, white or grey plumage. All are omnivorous to some degree.

- White-breasted woodswallow, Artamus leucorynchus
- White-browed woodswallow, Artamus superciliosus
- Black-faced woodswallow, Artamus cinereus
- Little woodswallow, Artamus minor
- Black-backed butcherbird, Cracticus mentalis
- Pied butcherbird, Cracticus nigrogularis
- Hooded butcherbird, Cracticus cassicus
- Black butcherbird, Cracticus quoyi
- Australian magpie, Gymnorhina tibicen
- Pied currawong, Strepera graculina

== Fantails ==
Order: Passeriformes Family: Rhipiduridae

The fantails are small insectivorous birds which are specialist aerial feeders.

- Northern fantail, Rhipidura rufiventris
- Black thicket-fantail, Rhipidura maculipectus
- Willie wagtail, Rhipidura leucophrys
- Rufous fantail, Rhipidura rufifrons
- Arafura fantail, Rhipidura dryas
- Gray fantail, Rhipidura albiscapa
- Mangrove fantail, Rhipidura phasiana

== Drongos ==
Order: Passeriformes Family: Dicruridae

The drongos are mostly black or dark grey in colour, sometimes with metallic tints. They have long forked tails, and some Asian species have elaborate tail decorations. They have short legs and sit very upright when perched, like a shrike. They flycatch or take prey from the ground.

- Spangled drongo, Dicrurus bracteatus

== Birds-of-paradise ==
Order: Passeriformes Family: Paradisaeidae

The birds-of-paradise are best known for the striking plumage possessed by the males of most species, in particular highly elongated and elaborate feathers extending from the tail, wings or head. These plumes are used in courtship displays to attract females.

- Trumpet manucode, Phonygammus keraudrenii
- Glossy-mantled manucode, Manucodia ater
- Raggiana bird-of-paradise, Paradisaea raggiana
- Magnificent riflebird, Ptiloris magnificus

== Monarch flycatchers ==
Order: Passeriformes Family: Monarchidae

The monarch flycatchers are small to medium-sized insectivorous passerines which hunt by flycatching.

- Golden monarch, Carterornis chrysomela
- Black-faced monarch, Monarcha melanopsis
- Black-winged monarch, Monarcha frater
- Spectacled monarch, Symposiachrus trivirgatus
- Spot-winged monarch, Symposiachrus guttula
- Frilled monarch, Arses telescopthalmus
- Frill-necked monarch, Arses lorealis
- Magpie-lark, Grallina cyanoleuca
- Leaden flycatcher, Myiagra rubecula
- Broad-billed flycatcher, Myiagra ruficollis
- Satin flycatcher, Myiagra cyanoleuca
- Restless flycatcher, Myiagra inquieta
- Paperbark flycatcher, Myiagra nana
- Shining flycatcher, Myiagra alecto

== Crows, jays, and magpies ==
Order: Passeriformes Family: Corvidae

The family Corvidae includes crows, ravens, jays, choughs, magpies, treepies, nutcrackers and ground jays. Corvids are above average in size among the Passeriformes, and some of the larger species show high levels of intelligence.

- Torresian crow, Corvus orru

== Berrypeckers and longbills ==
Order: Passeriformes Family: Melanocharitidae

The Melanocharitidae are medium-sized birds which feed on fruit and some insects and other invertebrates. They have drab plumage in greys, browns or black and white. The berrypeckers resemble stout short-billed honeyeaters, and the longbills are like drab sunbirds.

- Pygmy longbill, Oedistoma pygmaeum

== Australasian robins ==
Order: Passeriformes Family: Petroicidae

Most species of Petroicidae have a stocky build with a large rounded head, a short straight bill and rounded wingtips. They occupy a wide range of wooded habitats, from subalpine to tropical rainforest, and mangrove swamp to semi-arid scrubland. All are primarily insectivores, although a few supplement their diet with seeds.

- Lemon-bellied flycatcher, Microeca flavigaster
- Yellow-legged flycatcher, Microeca griseoceps
- Olive flyrobin, Microeca flavovirescens
- White-faced robin, Tregellasia leucops
- Mangrove robin, Eopsaltria pulverulenta
- White-browed robin, Poecilodryas superciliosa
- Northern scrub-robin, Drymodes superciliaris
- Papuan scrub-robin, Drymodes beccarii

== Larks ==
Order: Passeriformes Family: Alaudidae

Larks are small terrestrial birds with often extravagant songs and display flights. Most larks are fairly dull in appearance. Their food is insects and seeds.

- Horsfield's bushlark, Mirafra javanica

== Cisticolas and allies ==
Order: Passeriformes Family: Cisticolidae

The Cisticolidae are warblers found mainly in warmer southern regions of the Old World. They are generally very small birds of drab brown or grey appearance found in open country such as grassland or scrub.

- Zitting cisticola, Cisticola juncidis
- Golden-headed cisticola, Cisticola exilis

== Reed warblers and allies ==
Order: Passeriformes Family: Acrocephalidae

The members of this family are usually rather large for "warblers". Most are rather plain olivaceous brown above with much yellow to beige below. They are usually found in open woodland, reedbeds, or tall grass. The family occurs mostly in southern to western Eurasia and surroundings, but it also ranges far into the Pacific, with some species in Africa.

- Australian reed warbler, Acrocephalus australis

== Grassbirds and allies ==
Order: Passeriformes Family: Locustellidae

Locustellidae are a family of small insectivorous songbirds found mainly in Eurasia, Africa, and the Australian region. They are smallish birds with tails that are usually long and pointed, and tend to be drab brownish or buffy all over.

- Tawny grassbird, Cincloramphus timoriensis
- Gray's grasshopper warbler, Helopsaltes fasciolatus

== Swallows ==
Order: Passeriformes Family: Hirundinidae

The family Hirundinidae is adapted to aerial feeding. They have a slender streamlined body, long pointed wings and a short bill with a wide gape. The feet are adapted to perching rather than walking, and the front toes are partially joined at the base.

- Barn swallow, Hirundo rustica
- Welcome swallow, Hirundo neoxena
- Pacific swallow, Hirundo tahitica
- Red-rumped swallow, Cecropis daurica
- Fairy martin, Petrochelidon ariel
- Tree martin, Petrochelidon nigricans

== White-eyes, yuhinas, and allies ==
Order: Passeriformes Family: Zosteropidae

The white-eyes are small and mostly undistinguished, their plumage above being generally some dull colour like greenish-olive, but some species have a white or bright yellow throat, breast or lower parts, and several have buff flanks. As their name suggests, many species have a white ring around each eye.

- Lemon-bellied white-eye, Zosterops chloris
- Ashy-bellied white-eye, Zosterops citrinella
- Australian yellow white-eye, Zosterops luteus
- New Guinea white-eye, Zosterops novaeguineae
- Silvereye, Zosterops lateralis

== Starlings ==
Order: Passeriformes Family: Sturnidae

Starlings are small to medium-sized passerine birds. Their flight is strong and direct and they are very gregarious. Their preferred habitat is fairly open country. They eat insects and fruit. Plumage is typically dark with a metallic sheen.

- Metallic starling, Aplonis metallica
- Singing starling, Aplonis cantoroides
- Yellow-faced myna, Mino dumontii
- Common myna, Acridotheres tristis

== Flowerpeckers ==
Order: Passeriformes Family: Dicaeidae

The flowerpeckers are very small, stout, often brightly coloured birds, with short tails, short thick curved bills and tubular tongues.

- Olive-crowned flowerpecker, Dicaeum pectorale
- Red-capped flowerpecker, Dicaeum geelvinkianum
- Mistletoebird, Dicaeum hirundinaceum

== Sunbirds and spiderhunters ==
Order: Passeriformes Family: Nectariniidae

The sunbirds and spiderhunters are very small passerine birds which feed largely on nectar, although they will also take insects, especially when feeding young. Flight is fast and direct on their short wings. Most species can take nectar by hovering like a hummingbird, but usually perch to feed.

- Black sunbird, Leptocoma sericea
- Olive-backed sunbird, Cinnyris jugularis

== Waxbills and allies ==
Order: Passeriformes Family: Estrildidae

The estrildid finches are small passerine birds of the Old World tropics and Australasia. They are gregarious and often colonial seed eaters with short thick but pointed bills. They are all similar in structure and habits, but have wide variation in plumage colours and patterns.

- Red-browed firetail, Neochmia temporalis
- Crimson finch, Neochmia phaeton
- Star finch, Bathilda ruficauda
- Double-barred finch, Stizoptera bichenovii
- Streak-headed munia, Mayrimunia tristissima
- White-spotted munia, Mayrimunia leucosticta
- Gray-crowned munia, Lonchura nevermanni
- Chestnut-breasted munia, Lonchura castaneothorax

== Old World sparrows ==
Order: Passeriformes Family: Passeridae

Old World sparrows are small passerine birds. In general, sparrows tend to be small, plump, brown or grey birds with short tails and short powerful beaks. Sparrows are seed eaters, but they also consume small insects.

- House sparrow, Passer domesticus (I)
- Eurasian tree sparrow, Passer montanus (I)

== Wagtails and pipits ==
Order: Passeriformes Family: Motacillidae

Motacillidae is a family of small passerine birds with medium to long tails. They include the wagtails, longclaws and pipits. They are slender, ground feeding insectivores of open country.

- Eastern yellow wagtail, Motacilla tschutschensis
- Australian pipit, Anthus australis

== See also ==
- List of birds
- Lists of birds by region
