= Boatbill =

Boatbill can refer to a number of bird species:

- the boat-billed heron, Cochlearius cochlearius
- the boat-billed flycatcher, Megarynchus pitangua
- either of the two boatbills in the genus Machaerirhynchus:
  - Black-breasted boatbill, M. nigripectus
  - Yellow-breasted boatbill, M. flaviventer
