= Kempiella =

Scientific classification
- Kingdom: Animalia
- Phylum: Chordata
- Class: Aves
- Order: Passeriformes
- Family: Petroicidae
- Genus: Kempiella; Mathews, 1913

Type species
- Kempiella kempi Mathews, 1913

Species
- see text

Genus of birds

Kempiella is a genus of birds in the Australasian robin family Petroicidae that are found in Australia and New Guinea.

The genus was introduced by the Australian ornithologist Gregory Mathews in 1913 with the yellow-legged flyrobin (Kempiella griseoceps) as the type species. The two species in this genus were formerly placed in genus Microeca. They were moved to the resurrected genus Kempiella based on the results of a molecular phylogenetic study published in 2011.

== Species ==
The genus contains the following two species:

Image	Common name	Scientific name	Distribution
	Yellow-legged flyrobin	Kempiella griseoceps	New Guinea and Cape York Peninsula.
	Olive flyrobin	Kempiella flavovirescens	New Guinea.
