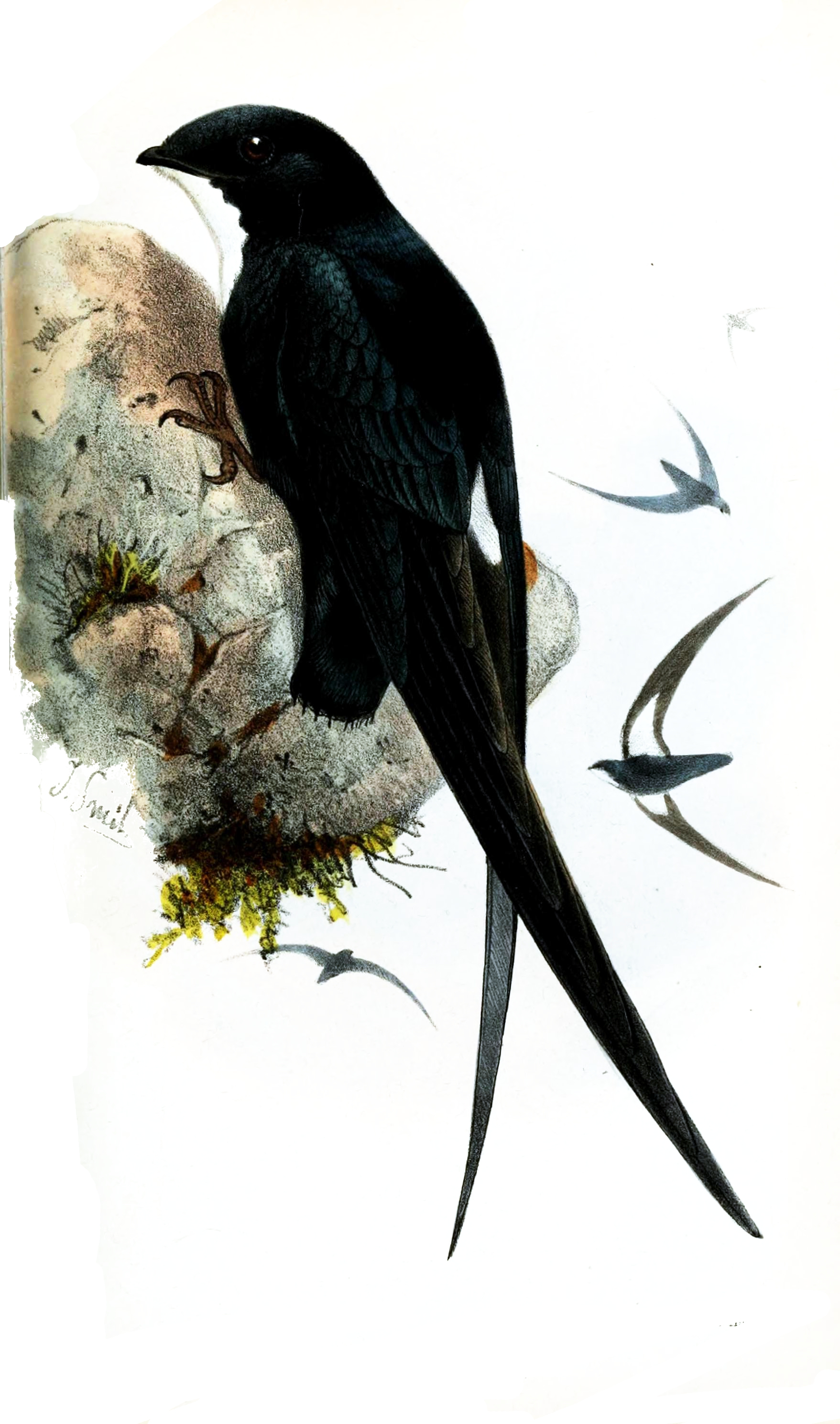

Scientific classification
- Kingdom: Animalia
- Phylum: Chordata
- Class: Aves
- Order: Apodiformes
- Family: Apodidae
- Tribe: Chaeturini
- Genus: Mearnsia; Ridgway, 1911

Type species
- Chaetura picina Tweeddale, 1879

= Mearnsia =

Genus of birds

Mearnsia is a genus of swifts in the family Apodidae.

It contains the following species:

- Philippine spinetail (Mearnsia picina)
- Papuan spinetail (Mearnsia novaeguineae)
