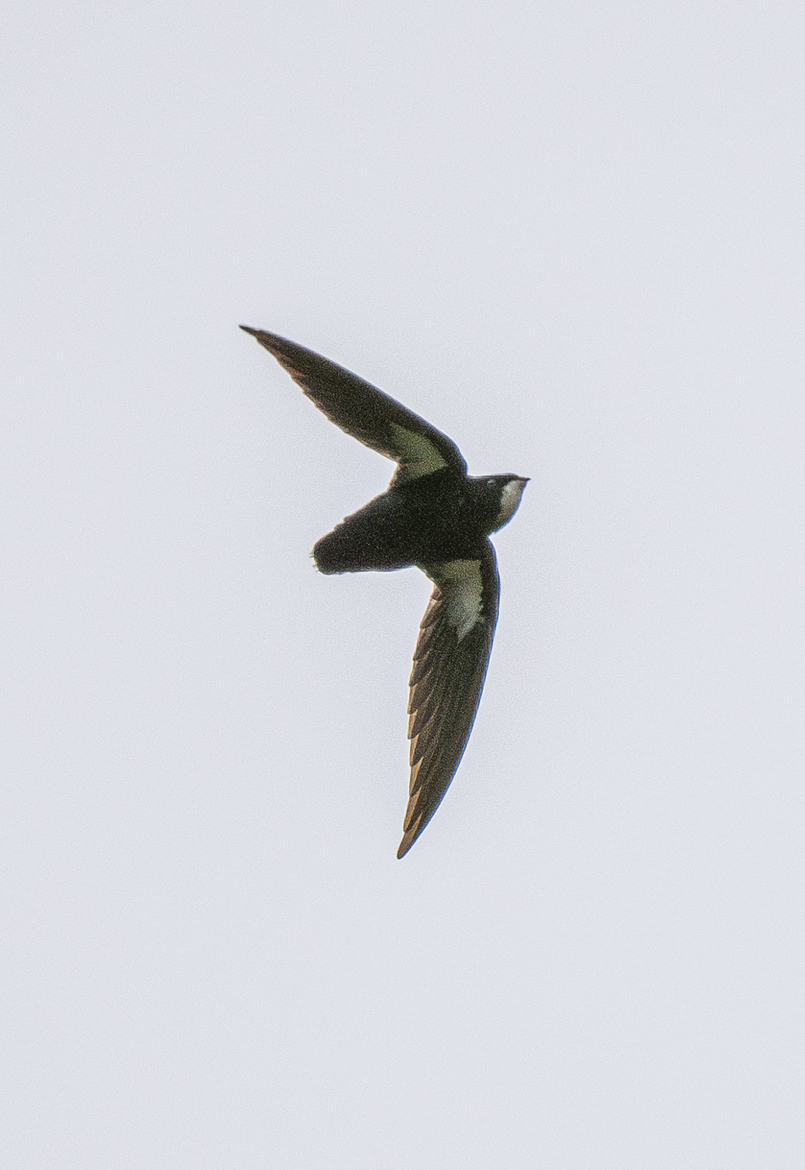

Conservation status
- Near Threatened (IUCN 3.1)

Scientific classification
- Kingdom: Animalia
- Phylum: Chordata
- Class: Aves
- Clade: Strisores
- Order: Apodiformes
- Family: Apodidae
- Genus: Mearnsia
- Species: M. picina

Binomial name
- Mearnsia picina (Tweeddale, 1879)

= Philippine spinetail =

Species of bird

The Philippine spinetail (Mearnsia picina), also known as the Philippine needletail or Philippine spine-tailed swift, is a species of swift in the family Apodidae. It is endemic to the Philippines found in the islands of Mindanao and Visayas. Its natural habitat is tropical moist lowland forests. It is becoming rare due to habitat loss.

== Description ==
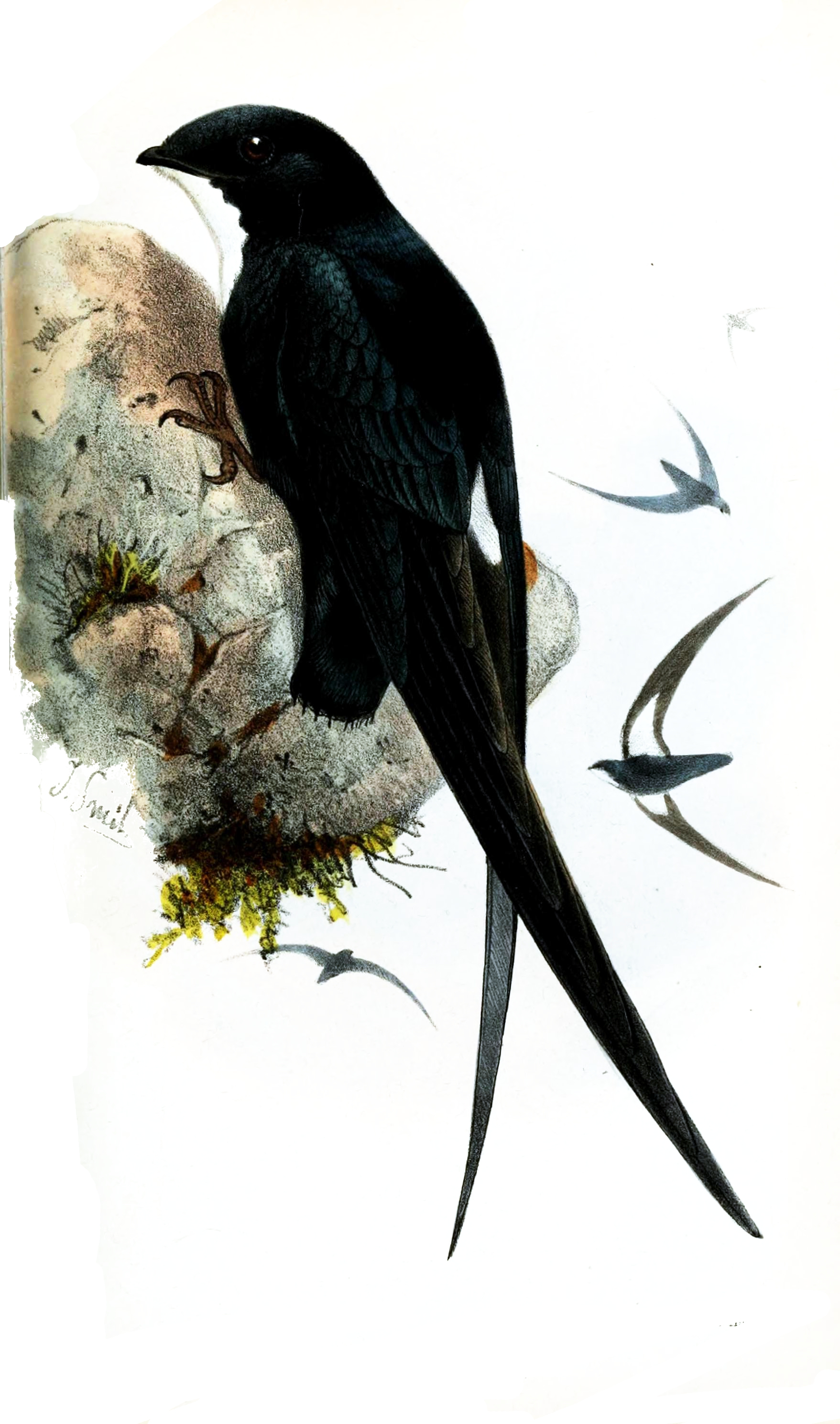

Formerly placed in the genus Chaetura but is now in Mearnsia. This species is monotypic and has no subspecies.

== Behaviour and ecology ==
It is seen alone or in small groups in high up in the air. It is presumed to feed on flying insects. Nothing at all is known about its breeding habits.

== Habitat and conservation status ==
It appears to be reliant upon forested streams below 1,000 m and will tolerate secondary and selectively logged forest and even streamside vegetation within coconut plantations, close to forest edge.

IUCN has assessed this bird as near threatened.This species' main threat is habitat loss with wholesale clearance of forest habitats as a result of logging, agricultural conversion and mining activities occurring within the range. The close association with lowland forests suggests that this species may be highly susceptible to habitat loss through commercial logging, conversion for agriculture and plantation forestry, as well as urban developments and mining
