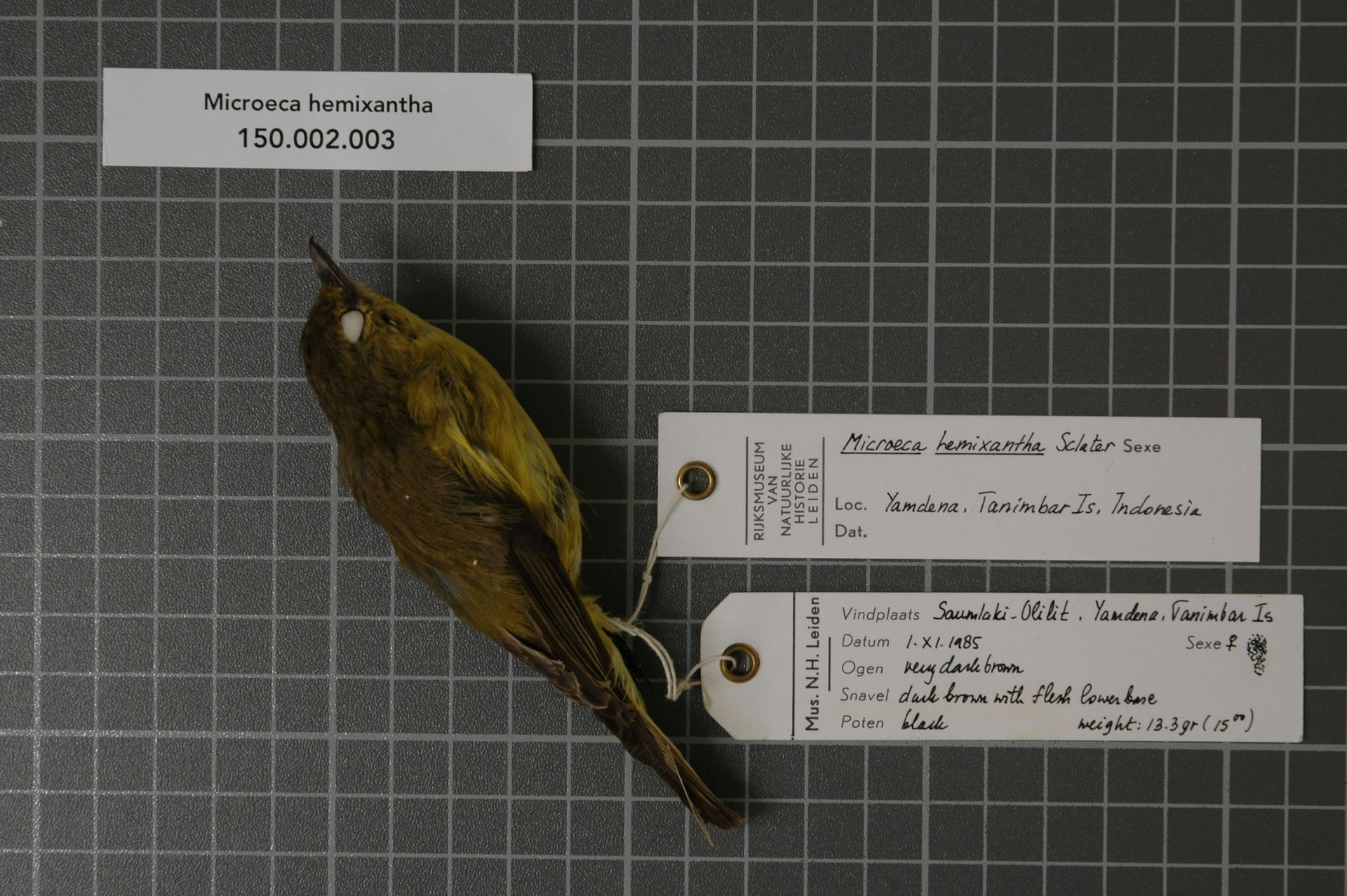

Conservation status
- Near Threatened (IUCN 3.1)

Scientific classification
- Kingdom: Animalia
- Phylum: Chordata
- Class: Aves
- Order: Passeriformes
- Family: Petroicidae
- Genus: Microeca
- Species: M. hemixantha

Binomial name
- Microeca hemixantha Sclater, PL, 1883

= Golden-bellied flyrobin =

Species of bird

The golden-bellied flyrobin (Microeca hemixantha) is a species of bird in the family Petroicidae. It is native to the Tanimbar Islands.

Its natural habitats are subtropical or tropical moist lowland forest and subtropical or tropical mangrove forest. It is threatened by habitat loss.
