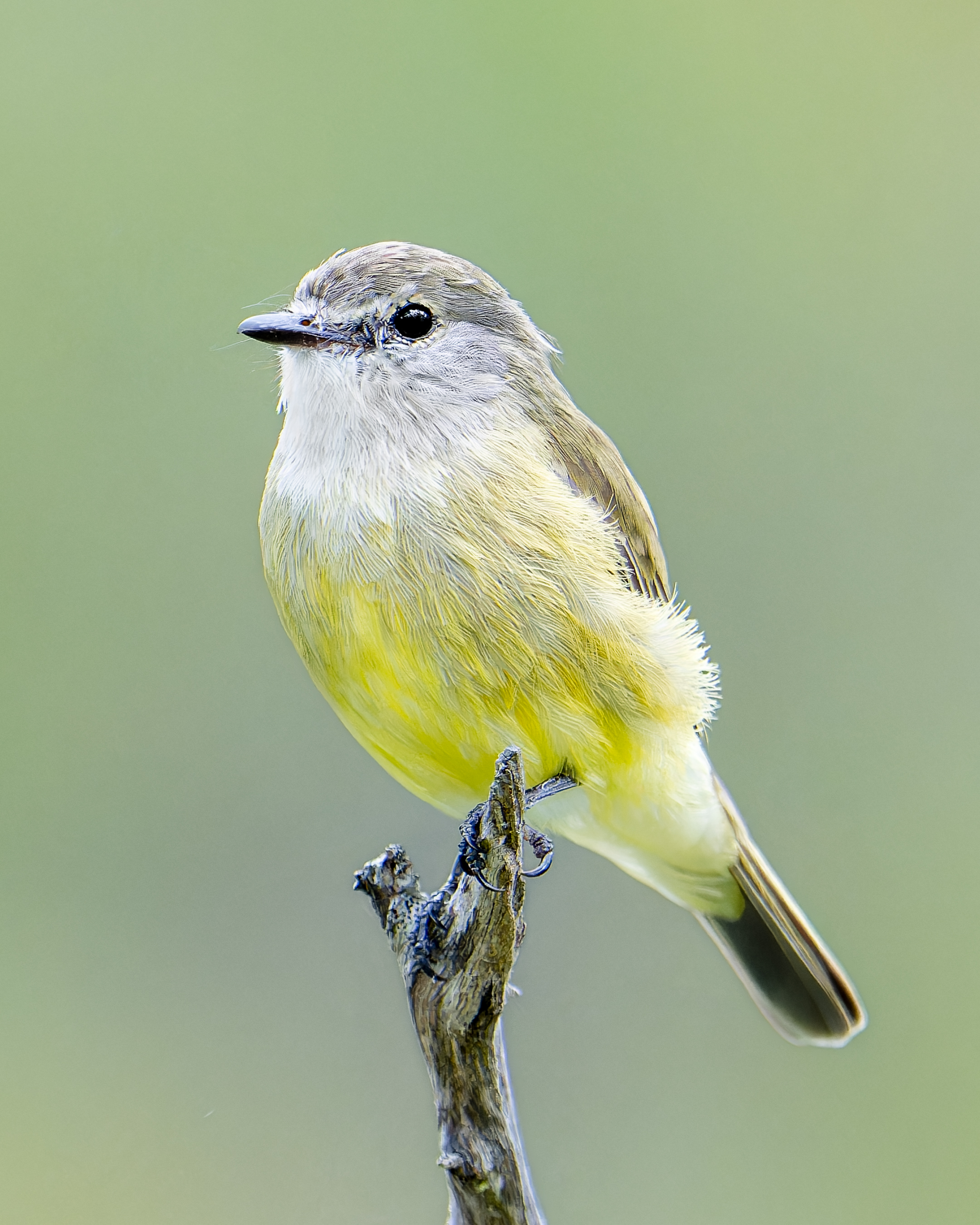

Conservation status
- Least Concern (IUCN 3.1)

Scientific classification
- Kingdom: Animalia
- Phylum: Chordata
- Class: Aves
- Order: Passeriformes
- Family: Petroicidae
- Genus: Microeca
- Species: M. flavigaster

Binomial name
- Microeca flavigaster Gould, 1843

Synonyms
- Microeca tormenti

= Lemon-bellied flyrobin =

Species of bird

The lemon-bellied flyrobin or lemon-bellied flycatcher (Microeca flavigaster) is a species of bird in the family Petroicidae. Found in Australia, Indonesia, and Papua New Guinea, its natural habitats are subtropical or tropical moist lowland forests and subtropical or tropical mangrove forests.

== Taxonomy ==
John Gould described the species in 1843 from a specimen from Port Essington in the Northern Territory. The species name is from the Latin word flavus meaning 'yellow', and Ancient Greek gaster meaning 'belly'. Four subspecies are recognised: the nominate flavigaster is found across the top of the Northern Territory, subspecies flavissima in Cape York and New Guinea, subspecies laetissima along the central-northern Queensland coast, and subspecies tormenti in the Kimberley of northwestern Australia. The two Queensland subspecies are separated by the Atherton Tableland and Burdekin-Lynd Divide, and are possibly kept apart by a population of the jacky winter (Microeca fascinans) that replaces it in some areas. Genetic analysis shows that the two Queensland subspecies are very closely related, but that there is quite a large separation from subspecies flavigaster. Subspecies tormenti was not sampled in that study.

Subspecies tormenti, known as the Kimberley flyrobin, was considered a separate species for many years. It is unusual in that it lacks the yellow pigmentation of the other subspecies. Les Christidis and Walter Boles reclassified it as a subspecies, since hybrids between subspecies tormenti and flavigaster have been found in the vicinity of Cambridge Gulf—between the ranges of the two subspecies.

As well as lemon-bellied flyrobin, the species is also commonly known as lemon-breasted flycatcher (from when belly was thought crude), yellow-bellied flycatcher, yellow-breasted flycatcher, or brown-tailed flycatcher (subspecies tormenti).

== Description ==
The adult lemon-bellied flyrobin is around 11.5 centimetres (4.5 in) long. The sexes have similar plumage. The nominate subspecies flavigaster has lemon yellow underparts, a white throat, grey face with a white eyebrow stripe, and olive-brown upperparts. Subspecies tormenti has white underparts, more greyish upperparts, has a longer bill and tail and is larger overall. Subspecies flavissima resembles flavigaster but has a more obvious yellow tinge to the upperparts, throat, yellow eyebrow and a shorter tail, while laetissima more closely resembles flavigaster, but has a shorter tail and bill and is larger overall.

== Distribution and habitat ==
The species ranges from the Ord River in the west to coastal Queensland, and is found in mangroves, paperbark swamp forests, and woodland.

== Feeding ==
The lemon-bellied flyrobin is an insectivore, hunting its prey in the foliage or dead branches of trees and shrubs and only rarely on the ground. Fieldwork in Kakadu National Park found that it occasionally caught large insects over 2 centimetres (0.79 in) in length; insects were generally caught by the bird hawking or sallying.

== Breeding ==
Breeding throughout its range, the lemon-bellied flyrobin breeds from August to February, raising one or two broods a season. The nest is a small dish-shaped structure made of bark and grasses in the fork of a tree. A single egg measuring 19 by 14 millimetres (0.75 by 0.55 in) is laid, pale blue with brownish markings.

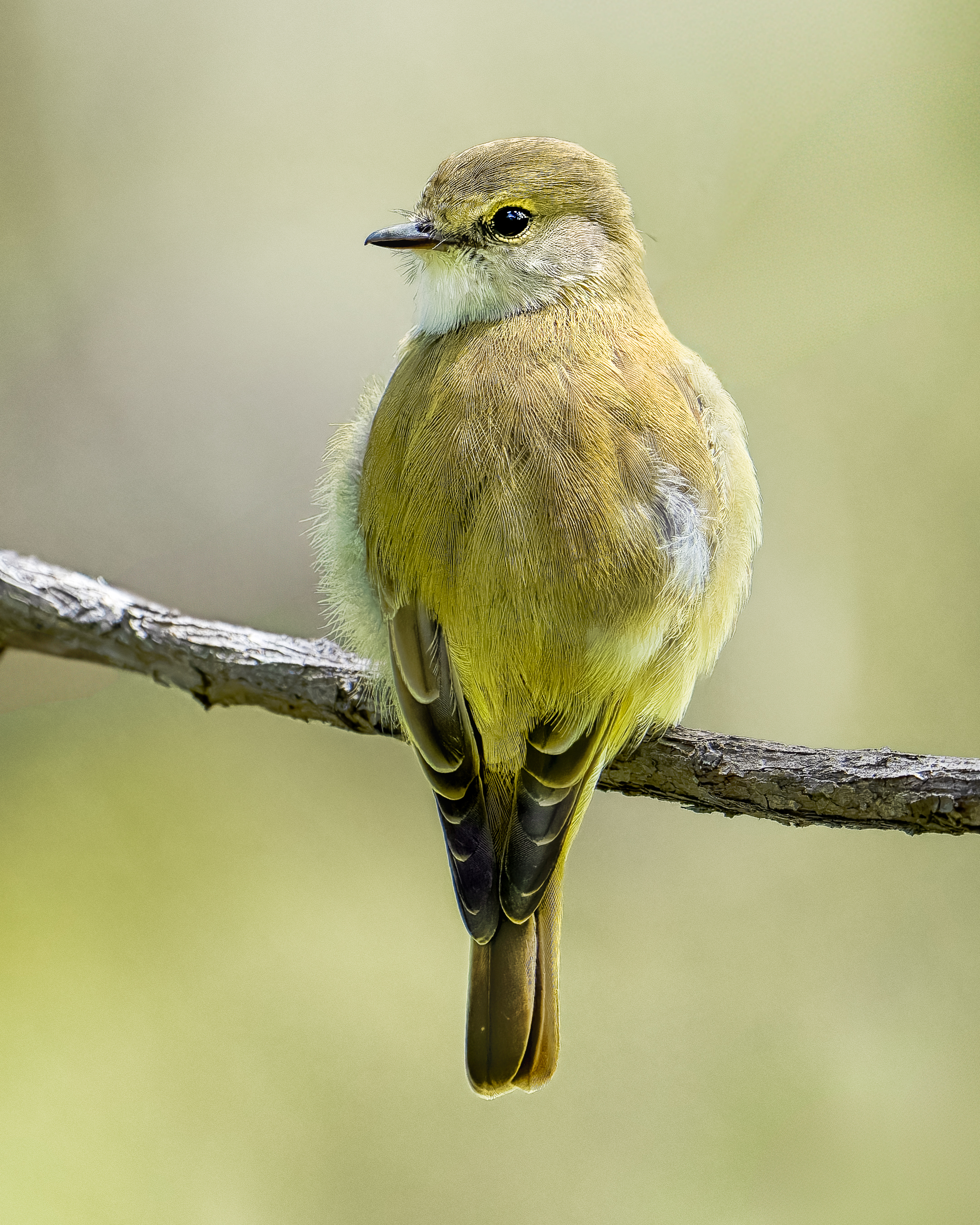
lemon-bellied flyrobin
