= Mayrimunia =

Scientific classification
- Kingdom: Animalia
- Phylum: Chordata
- Class: Aves
- Order: Passeriformes
- Family: Estrildidae
- Genus: Mayrimunia; Wolters, 1949

Type species
- Lonchura tristissima (streak-headed mannikin) Wallace, 1865

Genus of birds

Mayrimunia is a genus of small seed-eating birds in the family Estrildidae that are endemic to New Guinea.

The genus was introduced in 1949 by the German ornithologist Hans Edmund Wolters with the streak-headed mannikin as the type species. The name was chosen to honour the evolutionary biologist Ernst Mayr and combines his name with the genus Munia.

The two species now placed in genus were formerly placed in the genus Lonchura. They were moved to this resurrected genus based on a molecular phylogenetic study published in 2020.

== Species ==
The genus contains the following two species:

Genus Mayrimunia – Wolters, 1949 – 2 species
Common name	Scientific name and subspecies	Range	Size and ecology	IUCN status and estimated population
Streak-headed mannikin	Mayrimunia tristissima (Wallace, 1865)	New Guinea and some adjacent islands; recorded from Saibai Island in the northwestern Torres Strait, Australia	Size: 10 cm (3.9 in) Habitat: Grassy fringes of streams, forest clearings and abandoned gardens with secondary growth, in lowland New Guinea up to 1,000 m (3,300 ft) Diet: Mainly seeds and berries, with some insects	LC No evidence of decline
White-spotted mannikin	Mayrimunia leucosticta (D'Albertis & Salvadori, 1879)	Southern New Guinea	Size: Habitat: Diet:	LC
