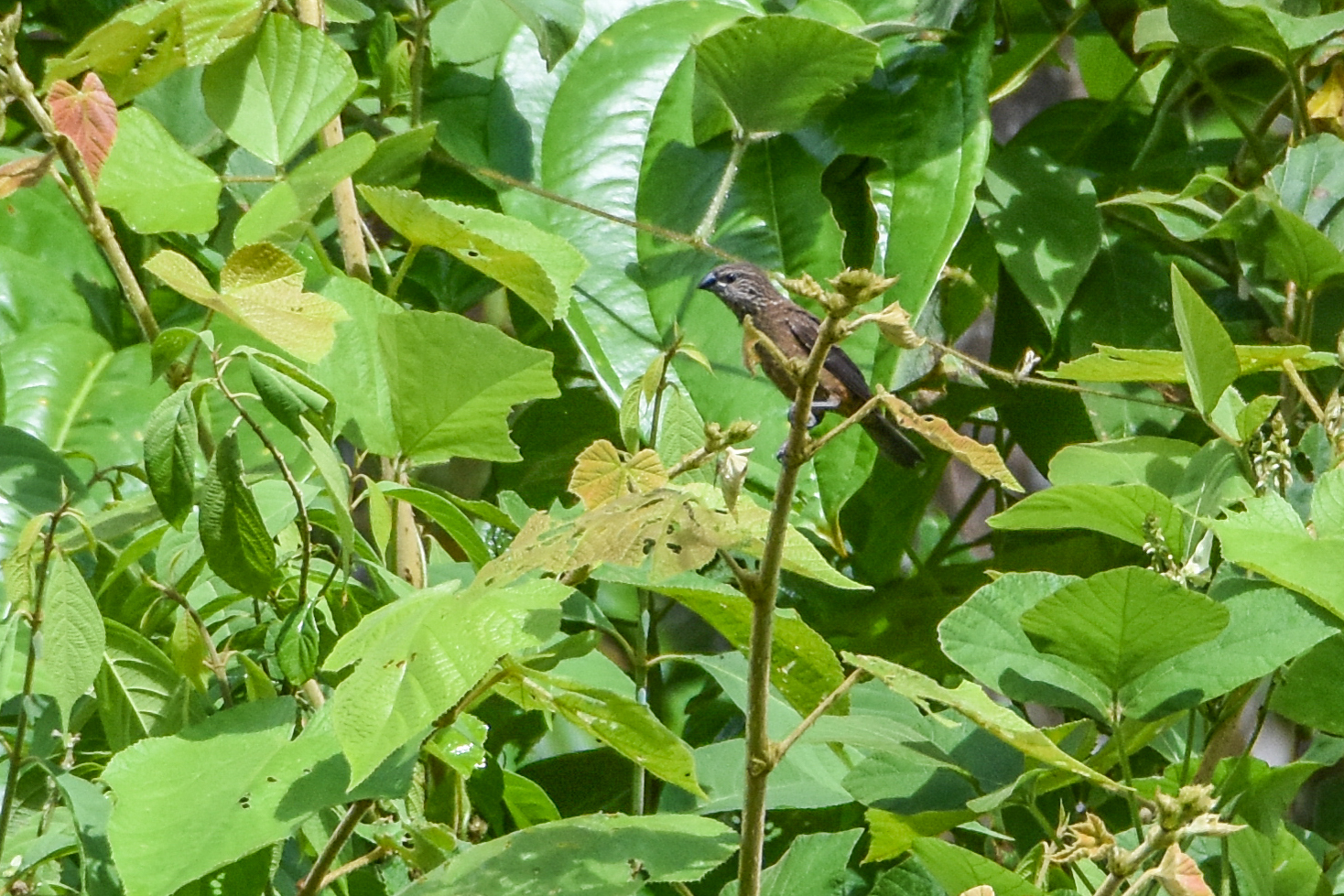

Conservation status
- Least Concern (IUCN 3.1)

Scientific classification
- Kingdom: Animalia
- Phylum: Chordata
- Class: Aves
- Order: Passeriformes
- Family: Estrildidae
- Genus: Mayrimunia
- Species: M. leucosticta

Binomial name
- Mayrimunia leucosticta (D'Albertis & Salvadori, 1879)

= White-spotted mannikin =

Species of bird

The white-spotted mannikin (Mayrimunia leucosticta) is a small passerine bird in the family Estrildidae. It is endemic to southern New Guinea.

This species has sometimes been considered as a subspecies of the streak-headed mannikin. The species is monotypic.
