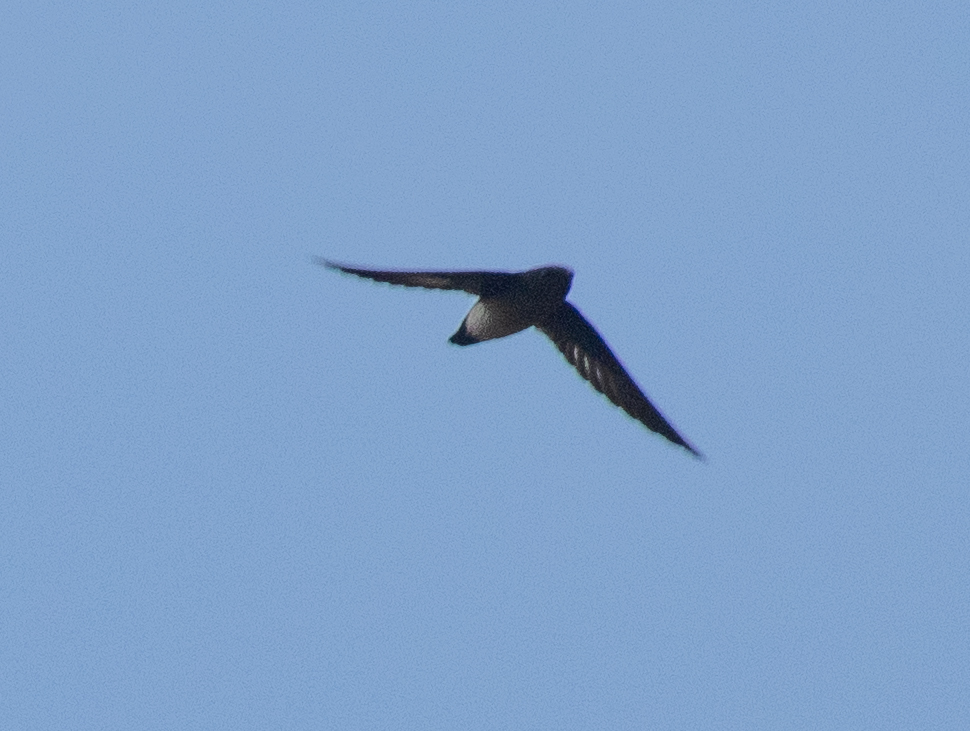

Conservation status
- Least Concern (IUCN 3.1)

Scientific classification
- Kingdom: Animalia
- Phylum: Chordata
- Class: Aves
- Order: Apodiformes
- Family: Apodidae
- Genus: Mearnsia
- Species: M. novaeguineae

Binomial name
- Mearnsia novaeguineae (D'Albertis & Salvadori, 1879)

= Papuan spinetail =

Species of bird

The Papuan spinetail (Mearnsia novaeguineae), also known as the Papuan needletail, New Guinea spine-tailed swift or Papuan spine-tailed swift, is a species of swift native to the island of New Guinea.

== Description ==
Mearnsia novaeguineae is a small (11.5 cm in length), stocky swift with a short, rounded tail. Tail spines extend up to 1 mm beyond the web of the tail. Head and upperparts glossy green-black, grey-throat with a white underside. Wings display hooked ends, and are widest at the middle before tapering into the body.

== Distribution ==
Endemic to New Guinea where it is widespread in the lowlands and hills up to 550 m. In 2004, the species was first recorded in Australia when three individuals were observed on Boigu Island, Queensland.

== Habitat ==
Forest edges, gardens and cleared areas with standing dead trees.

== Food ==
Flying insects.

== Breeding ==
Nests in high tree hollows, and may partially construct nest out of dry palm fibres.

== Conservation ==
Common and widespread species assessed as being of Least Concern, though population size appears to be decreasing.
