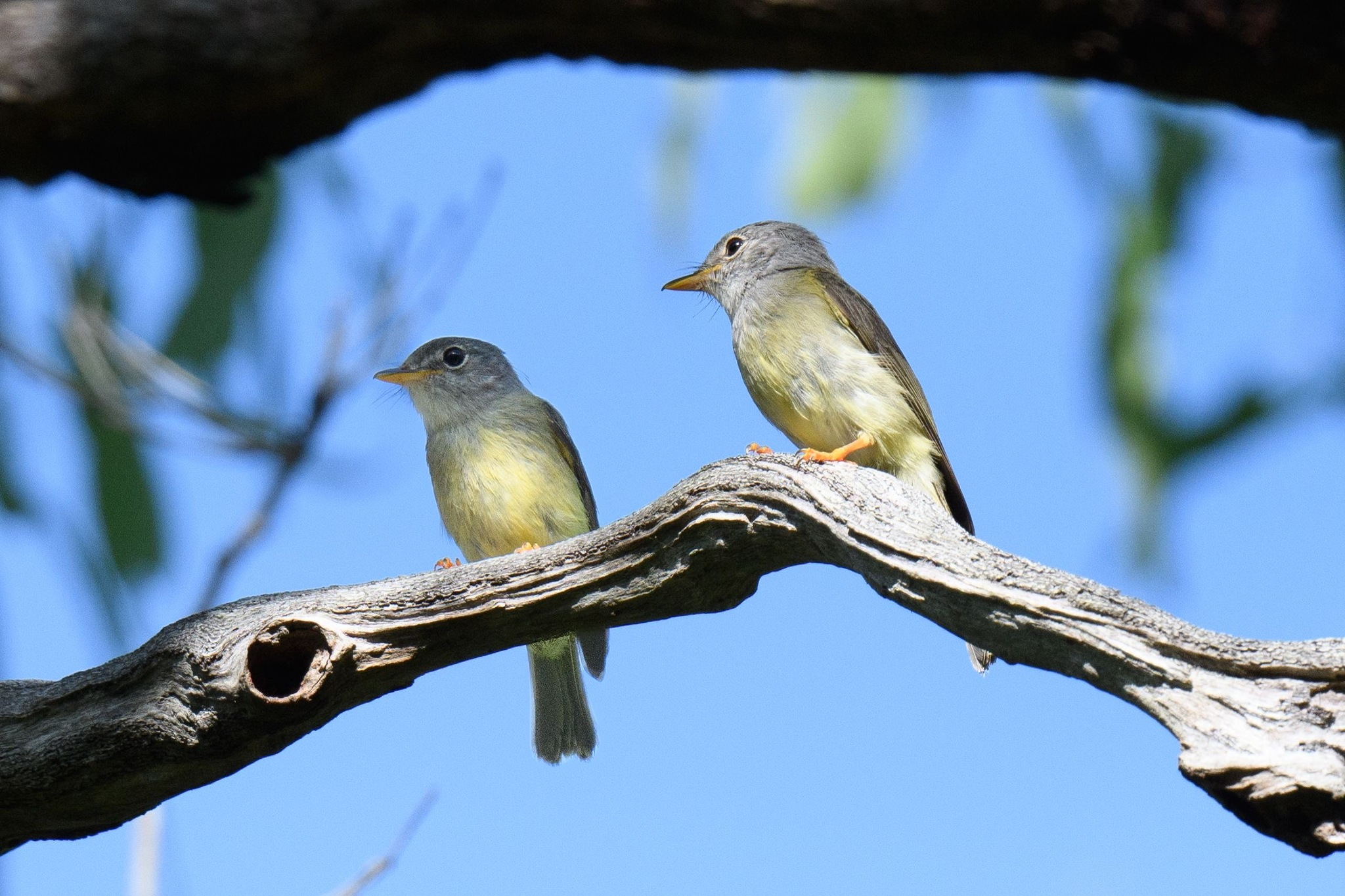

Conservation status
- Least Concern (IUCN 3.1)

Scientific classification
- Kingdom: Animalia
- Phylum: Chordata
- Class: Aves
- Order: Passeriformes
- Family: Petroicidae
- Genus: Kempiella
- Species: K. griseoceps

Binomial name
- Kempiella griseoceps (De Vis, 1894)

Synonyms
- Microeca griseoceps

= Yellow-legged flyrobin =

Species of songbird native to New Guinea and northern Australia

The yellow-legged flyrobin or yellow-legged flycatcher (Kempiella griseoceps) is a species of passerine bird in the Australasian robin family Petroicidae. It is found in New Guinea and Cape York Peninsula. Its natural habitats are subtropical or tropical moist lowland forest and subtropical or tropical moist montane forest.

The yellow-legged flyrobin was formerly placed in the genus Microeca. It was moved to the resurrected genus Kempiella that had originally been introduced by the Australian ornithologist Gregory Mathews based on the results of a molecular phylogenetic study published in 2011.
