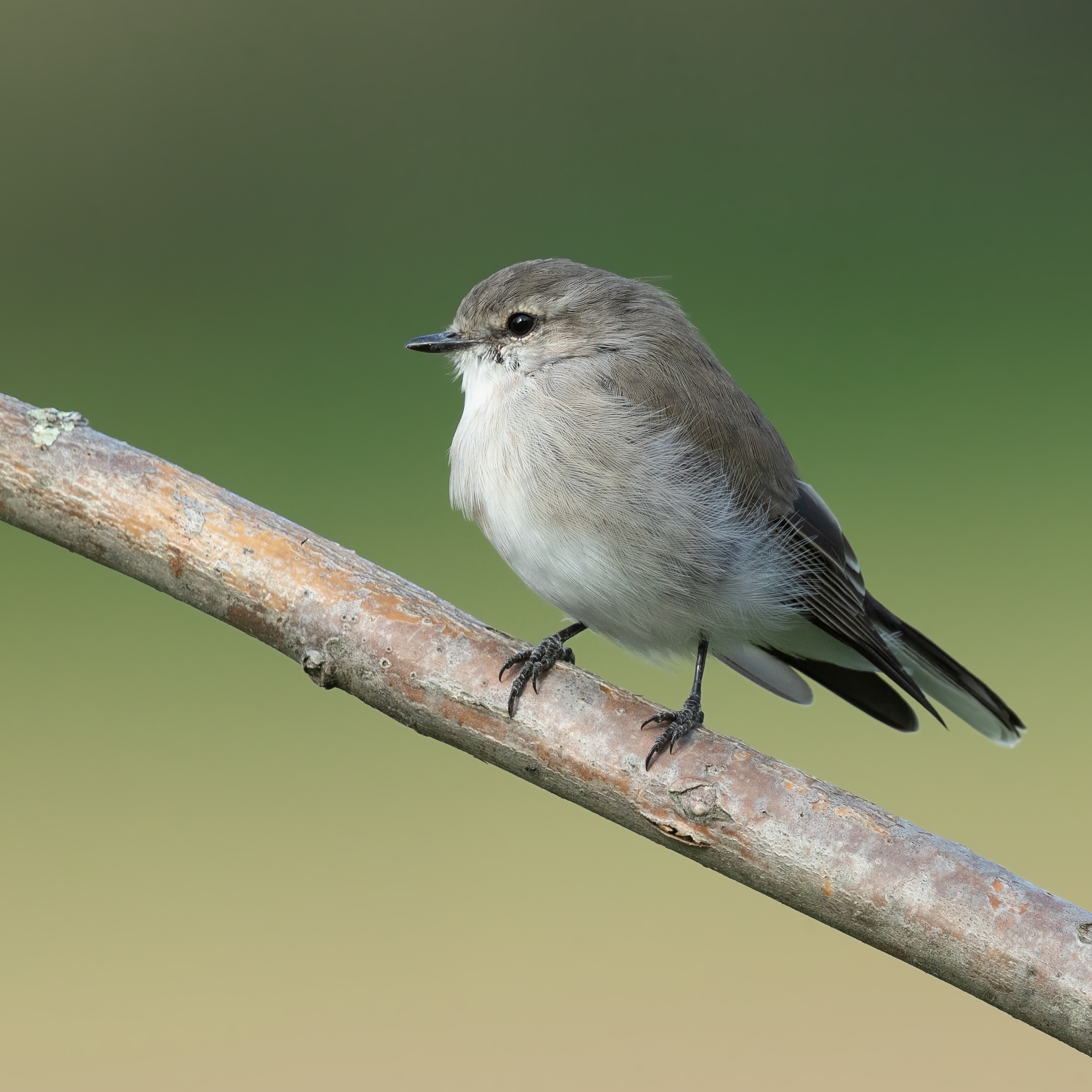

Conservation status
- Least Concern (IUCN 3.1)

Scientific classification
- Kingdom: Animalia
- Phylum: Chordata
- Class: Aves
- Order: Passeriformes
- Family: Petroicidae
- Genus: Microeca
- Species: M. fascinans

Binomial name
- Microeca fascinans (Latham, 1801)

= Jacky winter =

Species of bird

The jacky winter (Microeca fascinans) is a small grey-brown robin found commonly throughout Australia and also in Papua New Guinea. The jacky winter acquired its name due to rapid and strong vocalisations, which sound like jacky-jacky winter-winter. Their call is also often referred to as sounding like peter-peter-peter. Its habitats include open woodlands and farmlands.

== Taxonomy ==
The jacky winter belongs to the family of Australasian robins and flycatchers Petroicidae. This family includes around 49 species in around 19 genera that are all endemic to Australasia. The family Petroicidae evolved in a similar way to the Australo-Papuan warblers (Acanthizidae)—the latter evolved in isolation from similar families to them, namely Parulidae and Sylviidae, which occupied comparable niches in other continental regions, such as Central /South America and Eurasia, respectively. Petroicidae evolved in the Australo-Papuan area to fill an ecological niche, which was already being used by New World flycatchers (Tyrannidae) in North America and South America, and by Old World flycatchers (Muscicapidae) in Europe, Africa, and Asia. This is an example of convergent evolution.

The generic name Microeca derives from the Greek micros meaning 'small' and oikos meaning 'house'. This refers to the fact that they build the smallest nest of any Australian bird. The specific name fascinans is Latin for 'fascinating' and derives from fascinare meaning 'to bewitch'.

Other vernacular names for the jacky winter are brown flycatcher, peter peter, postboy, spinks and stumpbird.

The Gamilaraay and Yuwaalaraay people of northern New South Wales use the name dhunidjuni to refer to this species.

== Distribution ==
There are three races of jacky winter found in Australia. Microeca fascinans fascinans (leucophaea) is the most familiar race, and is found in central and eastern Queensland, New South Wales, Victoria, and southeastern South Australia. There are also Microeca fascinans assimilis, which is found in South Australia and south Western Australia, and Microeca fascinans pallida, which is found in northern and western Queensland, Northern Territory, and the Kimberley in Western Australia. Microeca fascinans zimmeri is a subspecies of jacky winter found in Papua New Guinea

== Description ==
The jacky winter is around 12 – 14 cm in length (including the tail) and its weight varies from 14 – 18 g. The plumage of M. f. fascinans includes a greyish breast with white on the bottom half, its head and back is greyish-brown, while its wings are a darker brown with white edges. The bill is black, it has a narrow eye-line and a buff alula stripe. The tail of M. f. fascinans is blackish brown with white outer feathers. Its legs are black. Subspecies M. f. assimilis is very similar to M. f. fascinans; however, it is darker, with more grey over the breast and flanks, covering up the white which is seen on M. f. fascinans. M. f. pallida is smaller than the other two subspecies, being only around 13 cm. M. f. pallida is much more pallid than the other subspecies, and is usually a sandy brown colour.

== Behaviour ==
Rush Creek, south-east Queensland

The jacky winter can be heard vocalising before sunrise and usually stops towards the middle of the day. Occasionally closer to sunset, it can be heard again. During the day they can be seen perched atop trees and posts, preening their feathers or even sunning to kill the parasites, which may be present in amongst the feathers.

=== Diet ===
The jacky winter is an insectivore and a sit-and-search predator, which moves amongst perches to locate food. This is a continuous activity that can cover long distances in order to find prey items. The jacky winter has two methods of hunting, which include hawking and ground-pouncing. Hawking is when a bird flies and drops to the ground, grabbing their prey during flight, while ground-pouncing is when they fly from a perch, grabbing prey as they land. Both of these hunting styles are used quite commonly by the jacky winter.

=== Reproduction ===
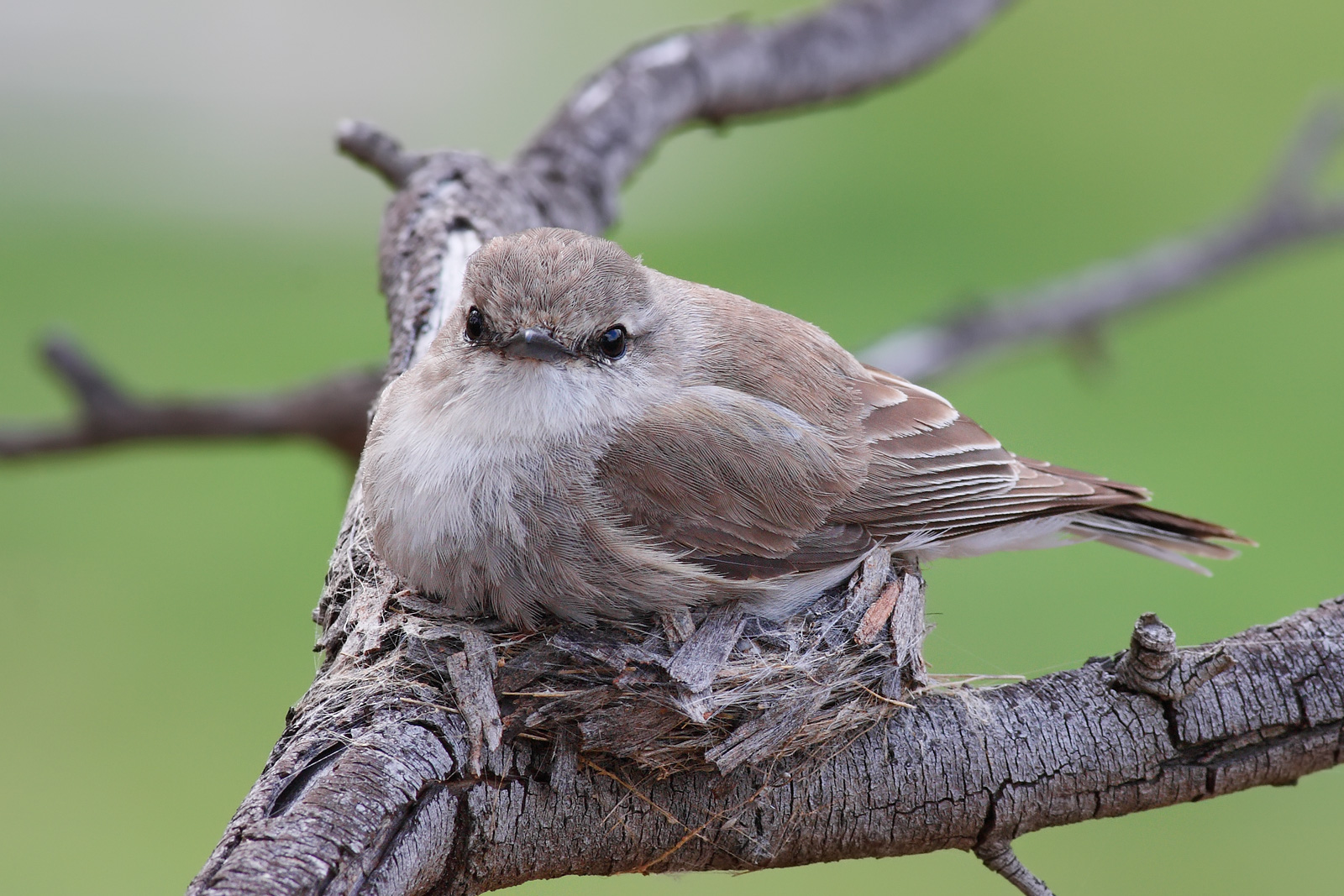
Female nesting

In many species of birds, the male plumage is quite bright and flamboyant to attract the opposite sex in hope of finding a partner to mate with. The jacky winter is instead a sexually monomorphic bird, which means that both the male and female are almost identical in appearance. Rather than plumage playing a significant role in attracting the opposite sex, the jacky winter male uses song to attract a female during courtship. In the eastern states of Australia, the jacky winter breeds mostly to the west of the Great Dividing Range, where a suitable habitat of eucalyptus woodland is present. They build a small, open cup-shaped nest, which is often made from grass and bark strips held together by spider webs. The nest is built in an exposed position, usually on a fork of a branch.

The breeding season of jacky winters occurs from September to November. Leading up to September, singing from the males is at its highest peak, then as the nestlings are born around late September, the singing becomes quite minimal. In late October, the singing increases again, lasting until early November, when the females lay a second brood of the season. By late November with the hatching of the young, the males stop singing, making vocalisations almost non-existent from then on. It stays like this until the birds have left the area. The nesting period lasts for 15 to 20 days, while the incubation is between 16 and 18 days. Only the female will incubate the eggs, while the male will help feed the young once they have hatched. 92 per cent of the time, the female will lay only two eggs per clutch. It is uncommon for this number to vary, since many different environmental factors determine the number of eggs per clutch in order to maximize the survival rate of fledglings from the nest.

Territory size of the jacky winter has been recorded at 1.7 ha, which is similar to other species of Petroicidae, such as the flame robin and scarlet robin. The jacky winter seems to favour habitats for breeding that contain a eucalyptus box woodland or open box woodland, which have patches of box trees and isolated live trees. Fallen logs and stumps are also favoured in habitat selection. The jacky winter holds these territories by perching on top of these eucalyptus trees and keeping a regular sustained call. The breeding density of jacky winters is about 17.2 ha for one pair. The jacky winter is known to defend their territory all year around.

== Status ==
The jacky winter is a common species of bird found throughout Australia, and is described as a bird of least concern by the IUCN (International Union for Conservation of Nature). Like many other small woodland birds in Australia, the jacky winter populations are declining and are considered to be a common species but decreasing.

All subspecies of the jacky winter in Australia are declining. M. f. fascinans is declining throughout eastern Australia, including New South Wales, Queensland and Victoria; M. f. assimilis is declining throughout Western Australia and parts of South Australia; M. f. pallida is declining throughout parts of Queensland, the Northern Territory, as well as the Kimberley in Western Australia.

== Threats ==
A number of species of woodland birds, such as the jacky winter, are declining and going locally extinct, due to the fragmentation and degradation of their habitats. These deleterious changes are not only happening in Australia, but around the world. Since European settlement in Australia, much of the woodlands have been converted to arable land and pasture, for crops to grow and for livestock to graze. Grazing livestock has impacted the jacky winter by decreasing the amount of small, ground and shrub vegetation, creating a lot of bare ground. This bare ground disadvantages the ground-pouncing jacky winter because a decrease in the larger terrestrial arthropods that they feed upon occurs.

The increase of bare ground, created by woodland fragmentation and degradation, can also cause nesting resources of the jacky winter to become scarce due to the increase of weeds in the area. This results in the jacky winter having to try to find another suitable habitat. Finding suitable habitats has become quite difficult for the jacky winter as other birds thrive in these landscapes. The noisy miner (Manorina melanocephala) is a winner of these human-altered landscapes, and is quite aggressive towards other small insectivores, such as the jacky winter. The jacky winter suffers quite negatively from the presence of the noisy miner, as it cannot outcompete it for food resources. The noisy miner has quite a negative impact on tree health, which also limits the availability of suitable nesting material for the jacky winter.

Climate change also threatens to cause the jacky winter to decline even further. A changing climate caused by anthropogenic sources has already been determined to affect the breeding activity, the timing of migration, and also the geographical and elevation range of birds quite significantly. These effects are seen all over the world on a number of different species. What threatens the jacky winter in Australia is rising temperature and evapotranspiration, causing more droughts and increasing fire severity and frequency. It is expected that these will impact the availability of food, as well as safe nesting sites and refuges from predators. The rising temperature has already caused birds around the world to decrease in body size. This has been interpreted as a micro-evolutionary response to global climate warming, and to the changes in nutrition associated with declining food availability and habitat quality, which the jacky winter is undergoing in southeastern Australia.
