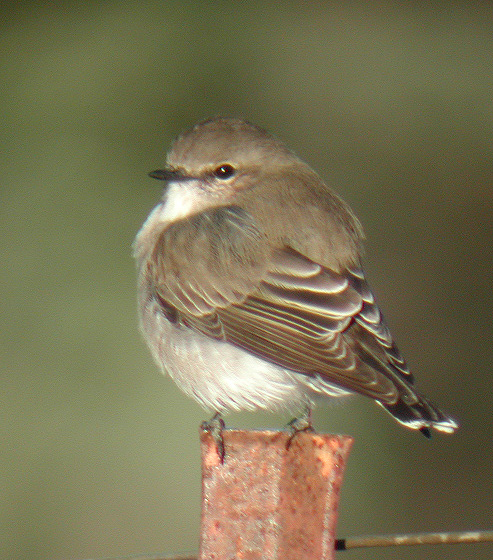
- Jacky winter (Microeca fascinans)

Scientific classification
- Kingdom: Animalia
- Phylum: Chordata
- Class: Aves
- Order: Passeriformes
- Family: Petroicidae
- Genus: Microeca; Gould, 1841

Type species
- Microeca assimilis Gould, 1841

Species
- see text

= Microeca =

Genus of birds

Microeca is a genus of passerine birds in the Australasian robin family Petroicidae. The species in this genus are commonly known as flyrobins (along with the closely related torrent flyrobin).

== Species ==
The genus contains three species:

Image	Scientific name	Common name	Distribution
	Microeca hemixantha	Golden-bellied flyrobin or Tanimbar flyrobin	Tanimbar Islands.
	Microeca flavigaster	Lemon-bellied flyrobin or lemon-bellied flycatcher	Australia, Indonesia, and Papua New Guinea
	Microeca fascinans	Jacky winter	Australia and also in Papua New Guinea.

Several other species were formerly placed in this genus:

- Yellow-bellied flyrobin or yellow-bellied robin (Microeca flaviventris)
- Olive flyrobin (Microeca flavovirescens)
- Yellow-legged flyrobin or yellow-legged flycatcher (Microeca griseoceps)
- Canary flyrobin or Papuan flycatcher (Microeca papuana)

There is also an undescribed taxon of Microeca called the "Bismarck Flyrobin" (see Dutson, Birds of Melanesia, p. 162 (2011)). A recording of its songs has been made.
