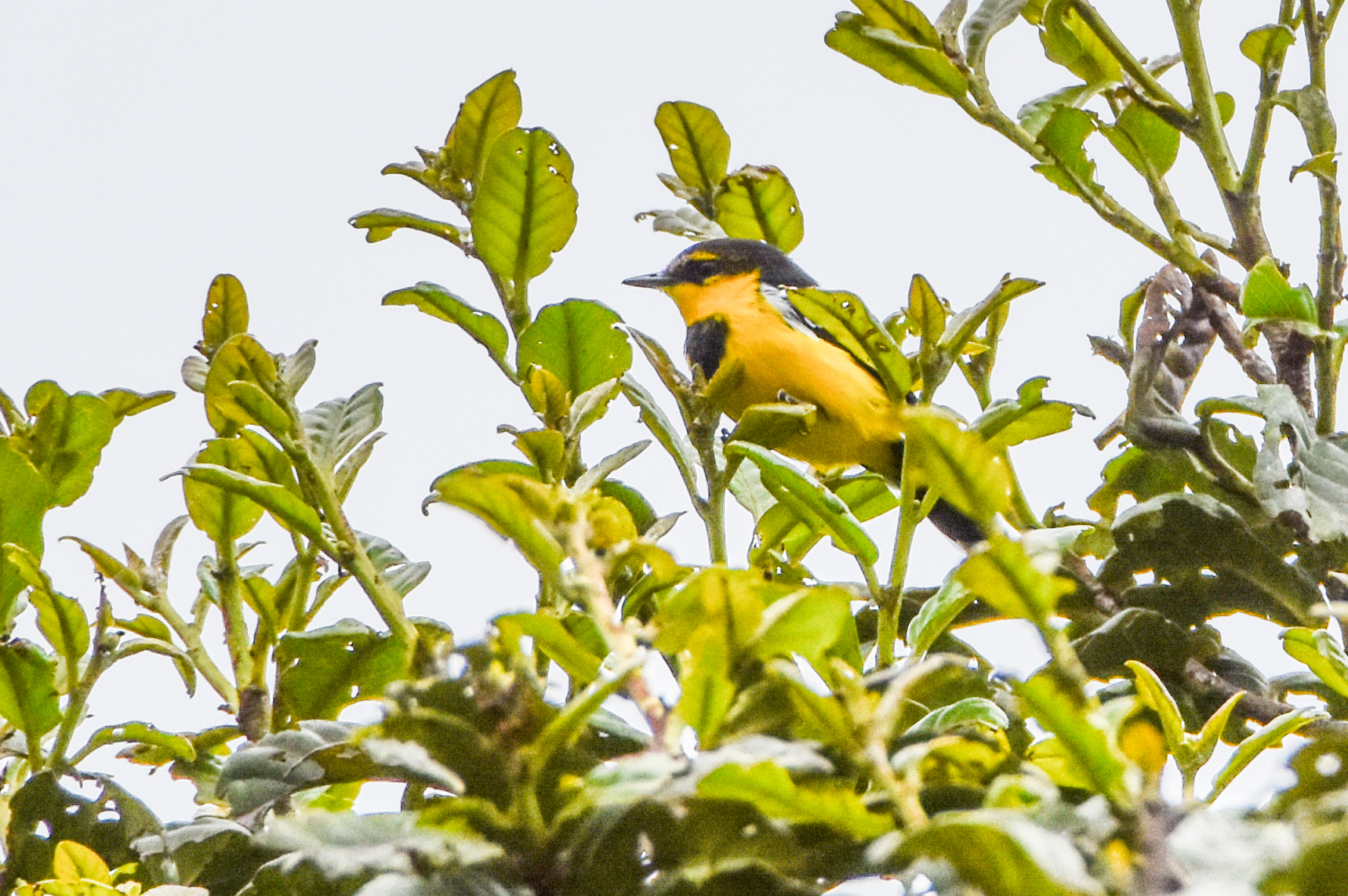

Conservation status
- Least Concern (IUCN 3.1)

Scientific classification
- Kingdom: Animalia
- Phylum: Chordata
- Class: Aves
- Order: Passeriformes
- Family: Machaerirhynchidae
- Genus: Machaerirhynchus
- Species: M. nigripectus

Binomial name
- Machaerirhynchus nigripectus Schlegel, 1871

= Black-breasted boatbill =

Species of bird

Machaerirhynchus nigripectus

The black-breasted boatbill (Machaerirhynchus nigripectus) is a species of bird in the family Machaerirhynchidae. It is found in New Guinea. Its natural habitat is subtropical or tropical moist montane forests. It is most commonly seen alone, but sometimes in pairs or mixed-species flocks. It is non-migratory.
