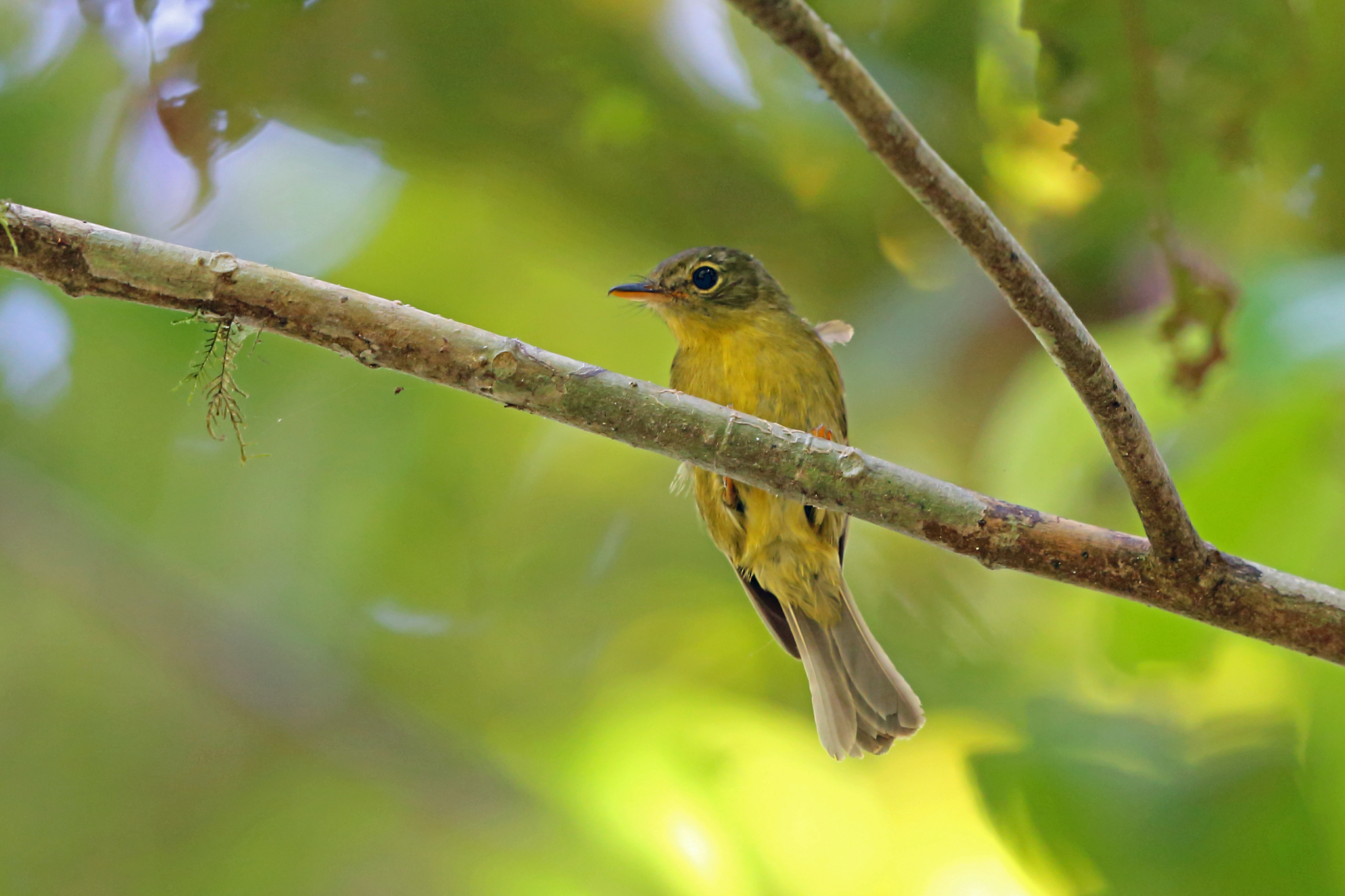

Conservation status
- Least Concern (IUCN 3.1)

Scientific classification
- Kingdom: Animalia
- Phylum: Chordata
- Class: Aves
- Order: Passeriformes
- Family: Petroicidae
- Genus: Kempiella
- Species: K. flavovirescens

Binomial name
- Kempiella flavovirescens (G.R. Gray, 1858)

Synonyms
- Microeca flavovirescens

= Olive flyrobin =

Species of songbird native to New Guinea

The olive flyrobin (Kempiella flavovirescens) is a species of bird in the Australasian robin family Petroicidae that is found in New Guinea. Its natural habitat is subtropical or tropical moist lowland forests.

The olive flyrobin was formerly placed in the genus Microeca. It was moved to the resurrected genus Kempiella, that had originally been introduced by the Australian ornithologist, Gregory Mathews, based on the results of a molecular phylogenetic study published in 2011.
