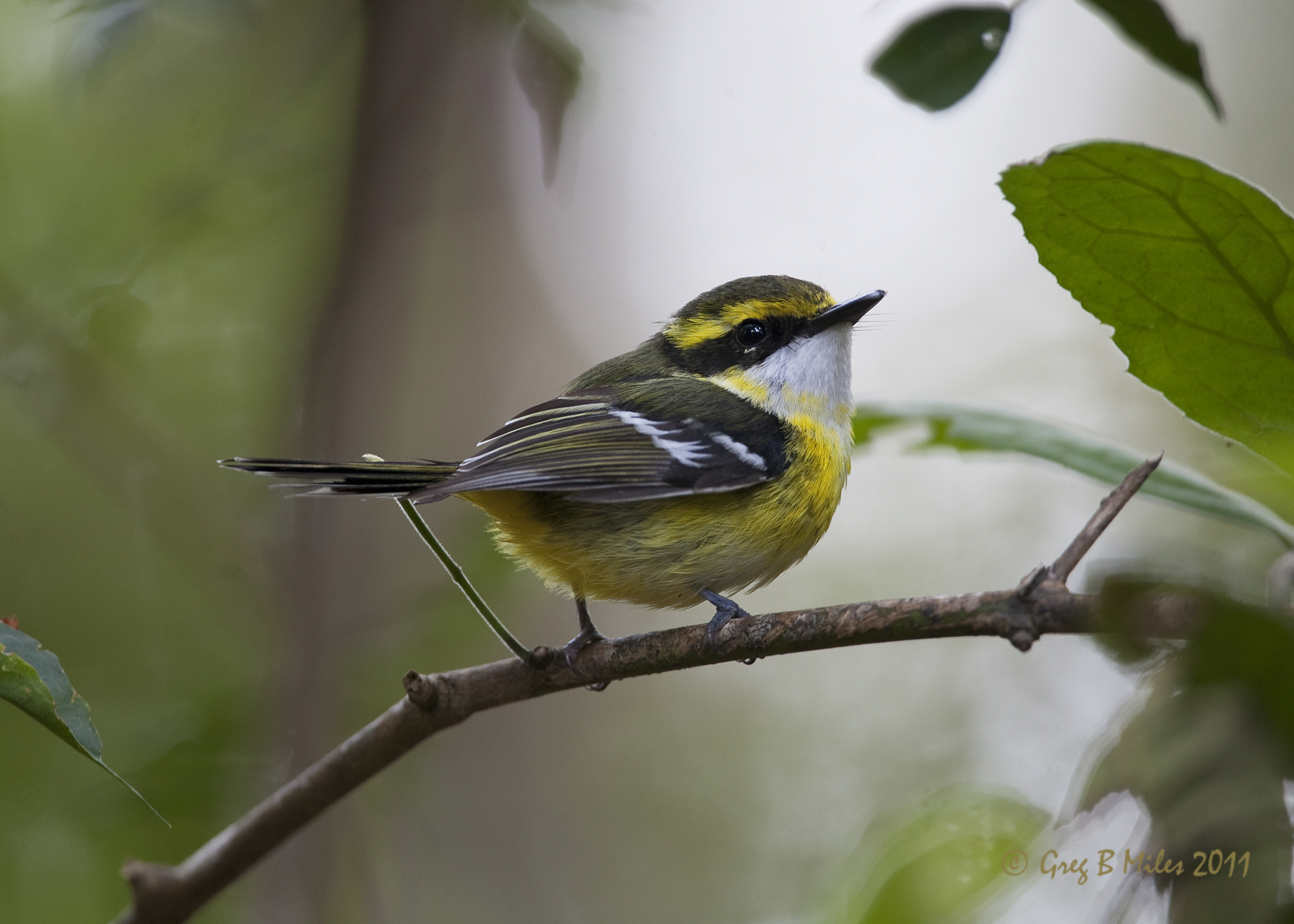
- female bird

Conservation status
- Least Concern (IUCN 3.1)

Scientific classification
- Kingdom: Animalia
- Phylum: Chordata
- Class: Aves
- Order: Passeriformes
- Family: Machaerirhynchidae
- Genus: Machaerirhynchus
- Species: M. flaviventer

Binomial name
- Machaerirhynchus flaviventer Gould, 1851

= Yellow-breasted boatbill =

Species of bird

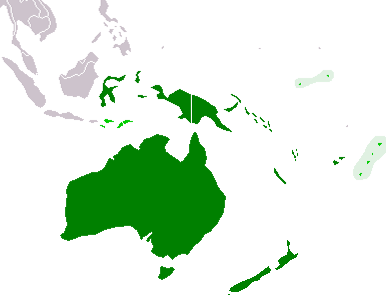
Simple map of Oceania.

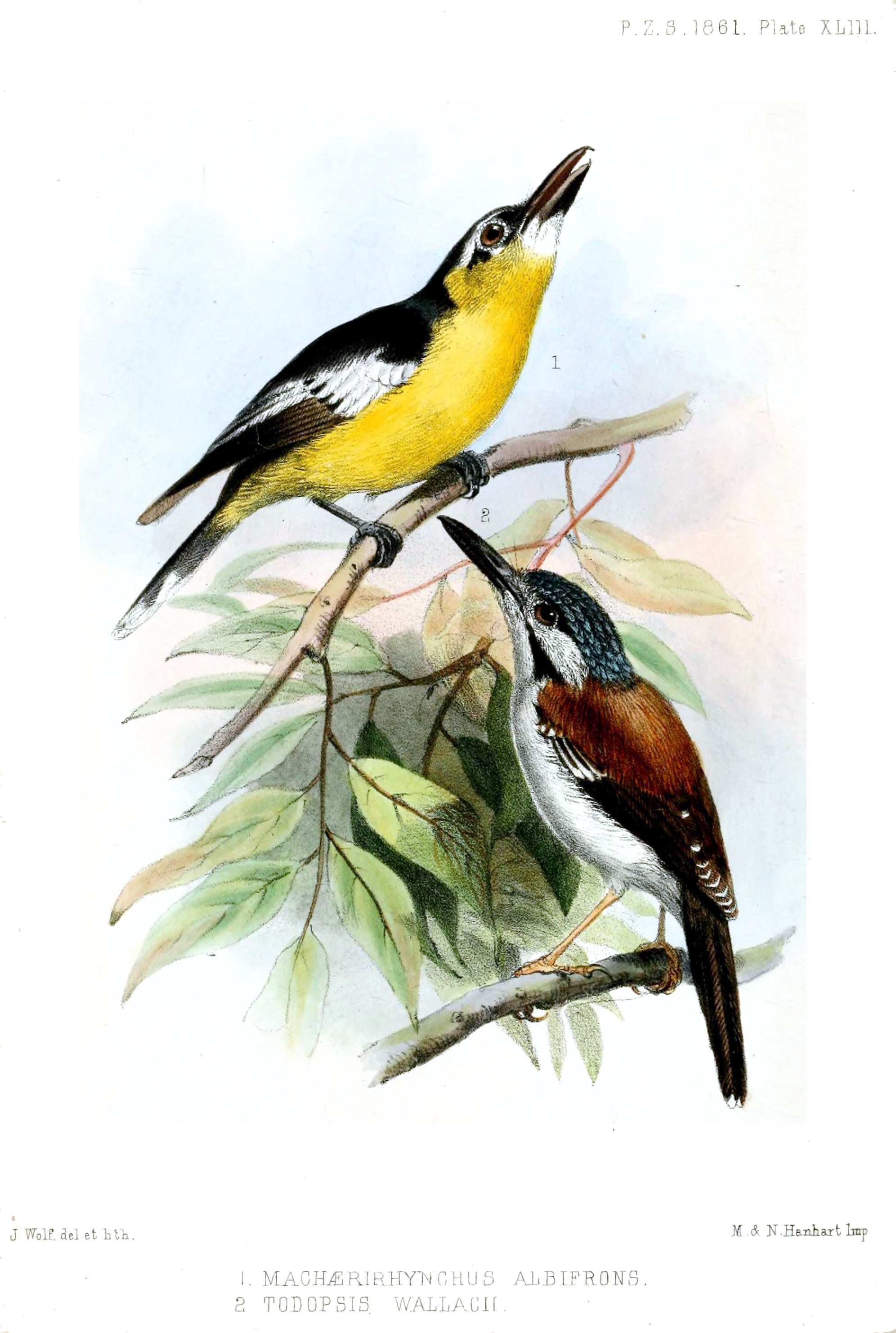
An illustration depicting a yellow-breasted boatbill (Machaerirhynchus flaviventer) and a Wallace's fairy-wren (Sipodotus wallacii) perched on a branch.

The yellow-breasted boatbill (Machaerirhynchus flaviventer) is a species of bird found in New Guinea and Far North Queensland, Australia. The yellow-breasted boatbill is a species of bird belonging to the Machaerirhynchidae family, of the genus Machaerirhynchus. The yellow-breasted boatbill is a common avian animal, and it is well known within communities of ornithologists. Its natural habitat is primarily that of subtropical or tropical regions, particularly moist forests; the yellow-breasted boatbill has no preference for altitude within its environment and can be found abundantly in its natural habitat.

== Description ==
The yellow-breasted boatbill is a distinctive bird that is small in size and stature ranging from 11 cm to 12.5 cm. On average they weigh around 9–10g. Its black bill is large relative to its body and is wide, long and flat resembling the shape of a boat, hence the bird's name. The tip of the bird's beak is hooked, similar in shape to other bird species, especially those in the same Machaerirhynchidae family. It also has a distinctive keel which serves to highlight the underside of the yellow-breasted boatbill, which is a distinguishingly bright yellow, leading all the way up the bird's body until its breast. This physical characteristic expectedly pertains to the bird's common name. The underside of the yellow-breasted boatbill's beak area is white, covering the region where its neck would be. The bird has large round eyes with stark black pupils. It also has a yellow stripe running across its forehead in an area akin to eyebrows. The upper top side of the boatbill is black for males, and a lighter olive colour for the females. Aside from that, there are not many other notable differences between the sexes. The bird has white stripes across the base of their wings, which are more commonly called wing bars. The yellow-breasted boatbill has a long black tail relative to their small bodies. The end of their tails is rounded, and they are often documented as being stiff, pointing upwards. The yellow-breasted boatbill has average sized legs with small talons at the end of a four toed foot, including the bird's rear metatarsals.

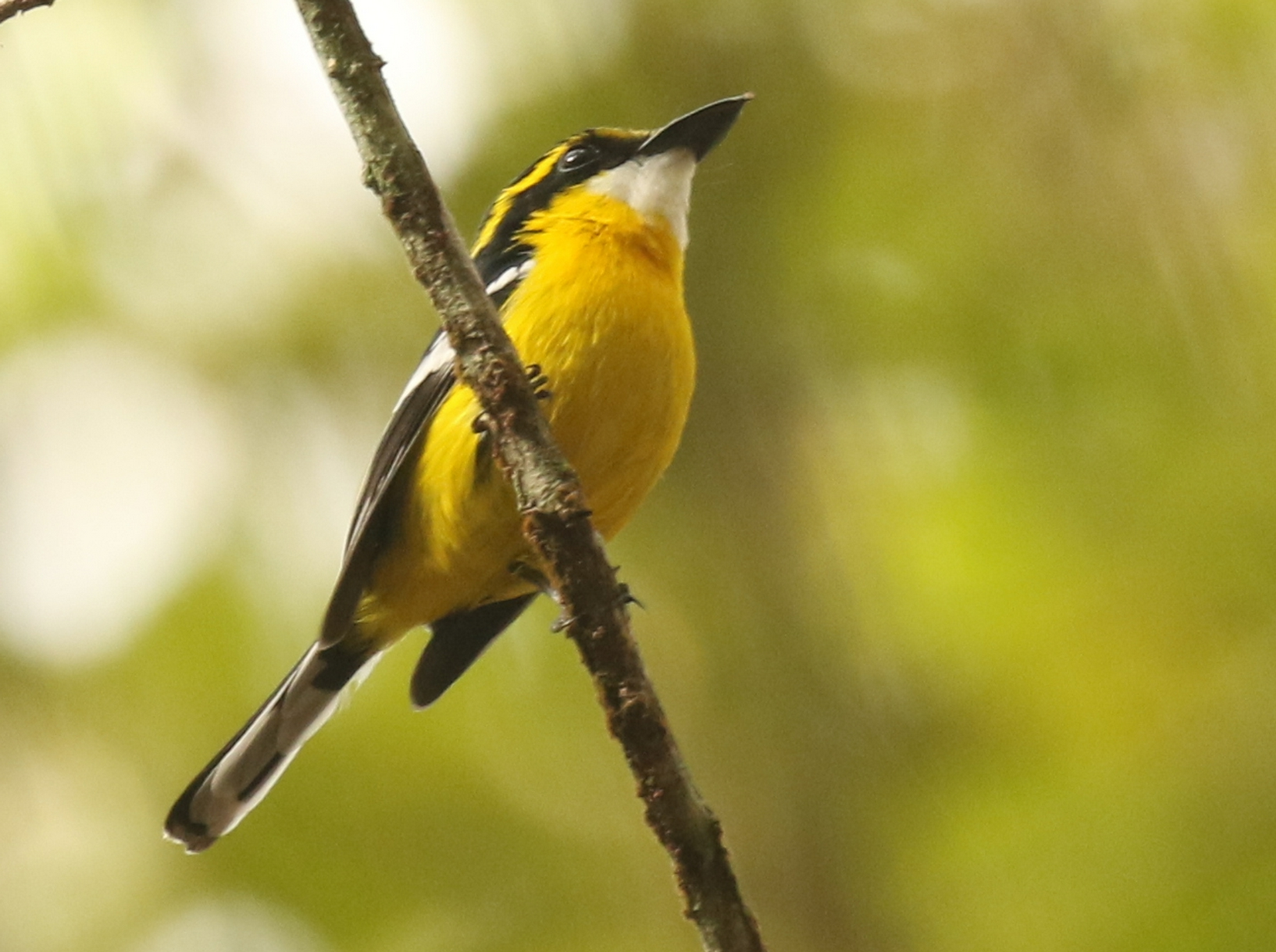
Pinnacle Road - South of Daintree National Park - Australia

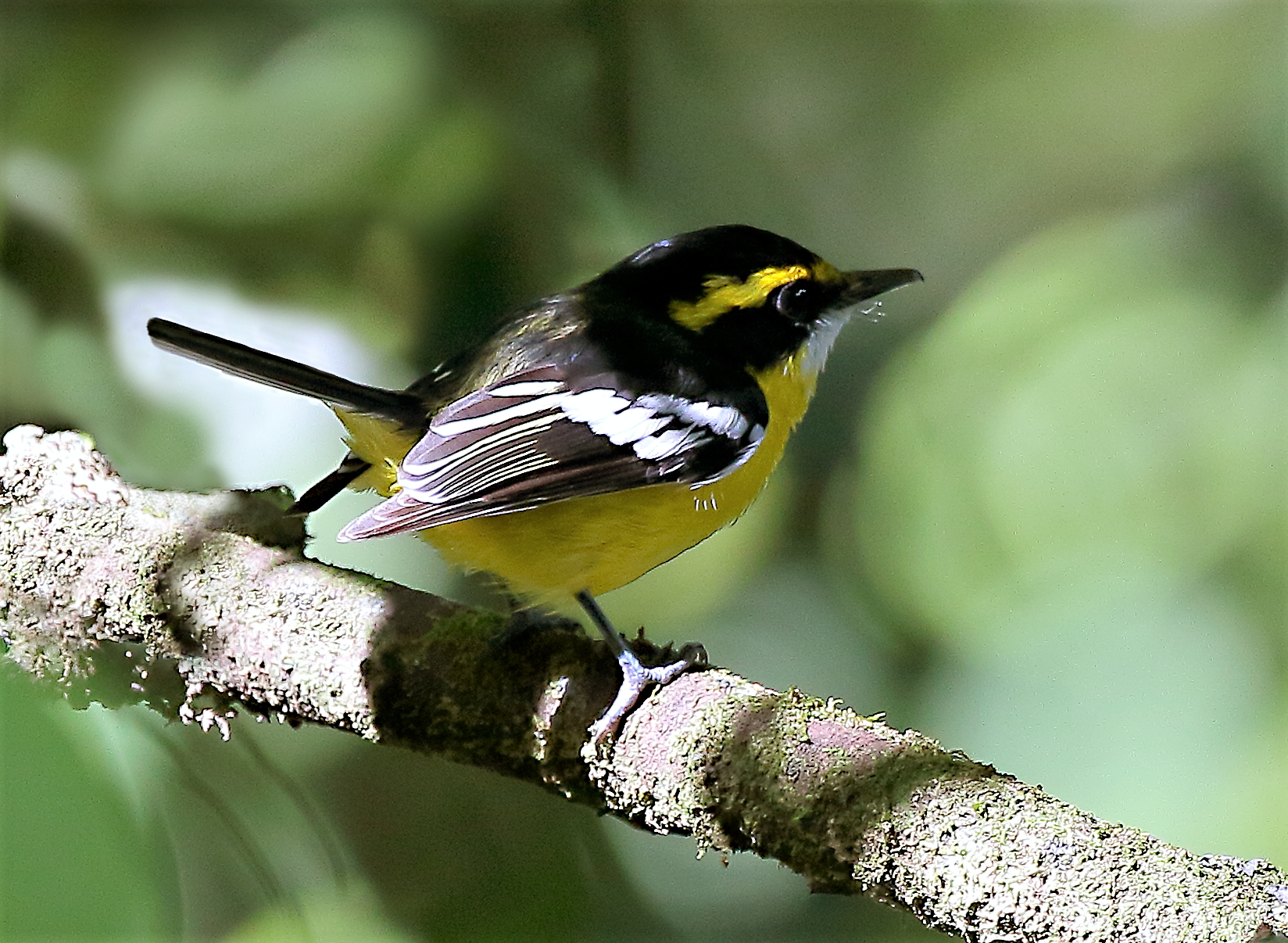
Little Mulgrave River, Cairns

== Distribution and habitat ==
The yellow-breasted boatbill can be found in the southern hemisphere, living in tropical areas all across New Guinea, but is not endemic to any specific country or island. This species has a very large range and it can also be found at the Cape York Peninsula, Australia, having been documented inhabiting the subtropical and tropical rainforests of North Queensland. Furthermore, it has also been sighted across several western offshore islands throughout the Oceania region. The yellow-breasted boatbill has a wider distribution across the entire island of New Guinea but can be found in higher population densities within North Queensland rainforests. Across all the listed geographical regions, the yellow-breasted boatbill is most commonly found in rainforest areas, where there is a high density of vegetation, typically composed of evergreen trees and shrubbery. Rainforests have elevated annual rainfall levels which promote the growth of plant life in the ecosystem. Rainforests provide suitable living conditions for the yellow-breasted boatbill because the large amounts of vegetation, compounded by the frequency of rainfall, attract large numbers of insects which the bird can prey on. Furthermore, the boatbill prefers to build its nests and live high up in the canopy where it is mostly safe from predators and immediate danger. It leaves the canopy only when it is foraging for food. Similarly, the yellow-breasted boatbill can also be found in gallery forests. Gallery forests boast a high frequency of rivers and ponds, which is beneficial to the boatbill because of the high abundance and diversity of vegetation it promotes. Gallery forests allow for the boatbill to safely build nests within shrubbery near riverbanks, which is also home to ample airborne insects for the bird to prey upon. Aside from rainforests and gallery forests, the yellow-breasted boatbill has also been found to inhabit forest edges and lowland ecosystems for many reasons similar to the ones listed above.

== Behaviour ==
The yellow-breasted boatbill is reclusive and unambiguous. As a result, documentation of the animal's behavioural adaptations and qualities are comparatively scarce. This species of bird has been known to live in pairs of two consisting of a male and female, who work together for most of their lives to raise their juvenile young from eggs. Furthermore, the average clutch size for the yellow-breasted boatbill is two, which is not uncommon for this specific family of bird. Clutch size refers to the number of offspring that are successfully laid by a bird species. Observational documentation suggests that the male does a majority of the nest building; however, it isn't uncommon for either bird to complete the nest construction. The nest is built from 5 to 25 meters above the ground. The boatbill's nests are often quite flimsy and are described as being translucent when viewed from underneath. However, the structural stability of the nest is unimportant as it serves its purpose, being used to harbour only two eggs and one parent at a time. The parents take turns roosting and have been recorded taking great care when switching roles. The bird which is nesting the eggs reacts diligently to the call of their partner and waits for their imminent return. Upon their arrival, the bird vacates the nest and the eggs are left exposed for no less than a couple seconds as the transition takes place. This behaviour serves to illustrate the care the yellow-breasted boatbill has for its unhatched young. The boatbill's mating call has been described as a song. The bird sings a harmonious series of chirps and tweets; an amalgamation of melodious cheeps and trills. When not nesting their young, the yellow-breasted boatbill tends to be foraging or hunting for prey. Its unusually shaped and disproportionately sized bill is a product of physiological adaptation for this species of bird to be able to better hunt for airborne insect prey. Furthermore, the hooked tip of its beak allows it to forage for insect prey across the canopy and along the floor of the forests it lives in. It feasts on vulnerable earthworms and other grounded insects following rainfall in rainforests, and near riverbanks underneath foliage in gallery forests.

== Conservation ==
The yellow-breasted boatbill is considered least concern according to the International Union of Conservation of Nature (IUCN) Red List of Threatened Species. This species of bird has been judged as a non-issue and unimportant in terms of focus for species conservation. This is justified by the sheer range of land that the boatbill lives in and also the population size for this species, which does not show any negative trends and is not below the threshold to be considered a vulnerable species. The areas that the yellow-breasted boatbill inhabits within Northern Queensland are primarily protected areas. Furthermore, there are currently no major natural threats to the species. However, the boatbill is considered to be among the top 100 terrestrial Australian bird species that is most sensitive to the effects of climate change upon ecosystems across Australia.

On account of its conservation status, the yellow-breasted boatbill is a valuable source of information because it can be studied to see what factors contribute to being able to thrive in harmony with humans. Ornithologists can focus on the components that contribute to the yellow-breasted boatbill's survival, as well as those factors which threaten it.
