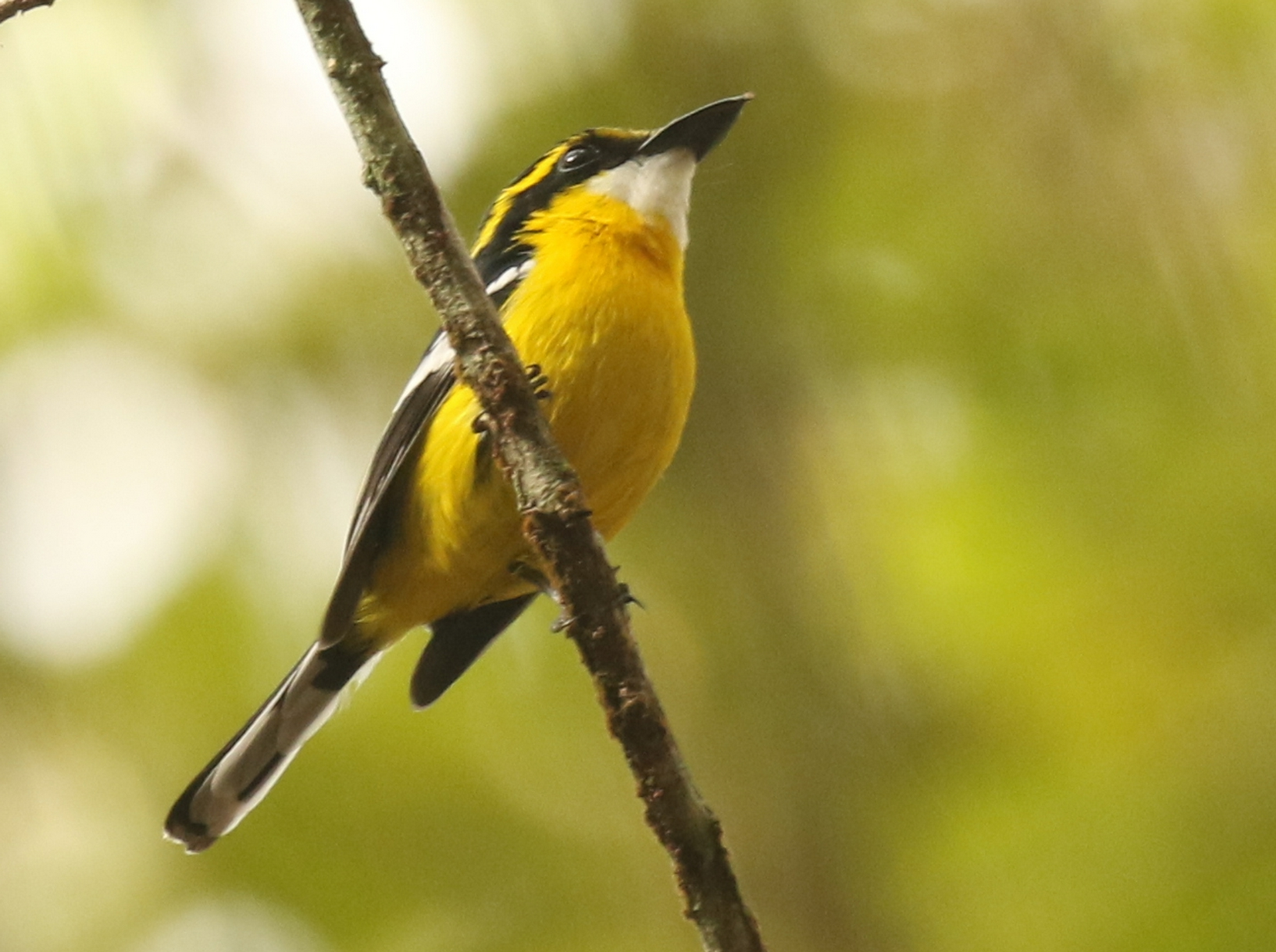
- Yellow-breasted boatbill (Machaerirhynchus flaviventer)

Scientific classification
- Kingdom: Animalia
- Phylum: Chordata
- Class: Aves
- Order: Passeriformes
- Superfamily: Malaconotoidea
- Family: Machaerirhynchidae
- Genus: Machaerirhynchus; Gould, 1851

Type species
- Machaerirhynchus flaviventer Gould, 1851

= Machaerirhynchus =

Boatbills

Genus of birds

The boatbills are a small genus of passerine birds in the genus Machaerirhynchus distributed across New Guinea and northern Queensland. The genus was once placed with the monarch flycatcher family Monarchidae, but are now treated as a small family, Machaerirhynchidae. The genus was first described by John Gould in 1851, and was named for the Ancient Greek makhaira meaning knife and rhunkhos for bill.

The boatbills are small forest birds with predominately yellow and black plumage. They are very similar in appearance to the two genera of tody-flycatchers of South America, but this is due to convergent evolution as the groups are not closely related. They have large heads and wide bills, and long tails which are frequently held cocked over their back.

The boatbills comprise two species, one found in the far north of Queensland in Australia, the second across the island of New Guinea. They occupy both lowland and monante rainforest, including primary forest, disturbed secondary forest and forest edge habitats.

The species are:

Image	Common name	Scientific name	Distribution
	Black-breasted boatbill	Machaerirhynchus nigripectus	New Guinea
	Yellow-breasted boatbill	Machaerirhynchus flaviventer	Northeast Australia.
