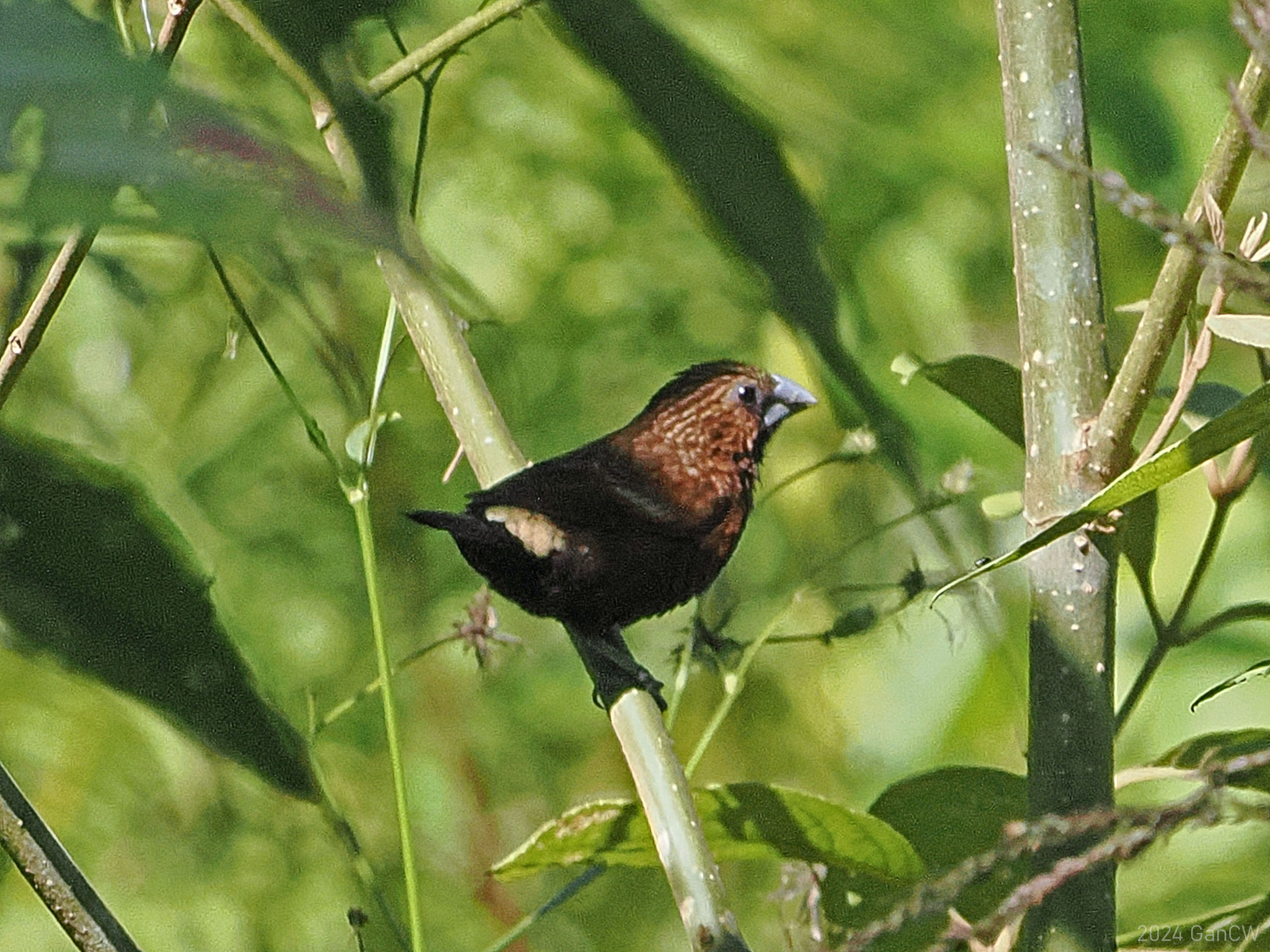

Conservation status
- Least Concern (IUCN 3.1)

Scientific classification
- Kingdom: Animalia
- Phylum: Chordata
- Class: Aves
- Order: Passeriformes
- Family: Estrildidae
- Genus: Mayrimunia
- Species: M. tristissima

Binomial name
- Mayrimunia tristissima (Wallace, 1865)

Synonyms
- Lonchura tristissima

= Streak-headed mannikin =

Species of bird

The streak-headed mannikin (Mayrimunia tristissima) also known as the streak-headed munia, is a small 10 cm (3.9 in) long estrildid finch.

== Description ==
Mainly dark brown plumage with light streaking on head and yellowish rump; subspecies leucosticta also with white spotting on face, breast and upper wing-coverts. The call is a short buzzing note, repeated in flight.

== Habitat and distribution ==
Endemic to New Guinea and some adjacent islands. It has been recorded from Saibai Island, Queensland, Australian territory in north-western Torres Strait. Its preferred habitat is the grassy fringes of streams, forest clearings and abandoned gardens with secondary growth, in lowland New Guinea up to 1,000 m (3,300 ft) altitude.

== Behaviour and ecology ==
=== Breeding ===
A globular grass nest is constructed with side entrance, often suspended from rattans, in forest or at forest edge.

=== Food and feeding ===
The diet is mainly seeds and berries but it also includes some insects.

== Conservation ==
As a species with a large range and no evidence of population decline, it is assessed as being of Least Concern.
