= Greenly =

Greenly may refer to:

== People with the surname ==
- Henry Greenly, the railway engineer, and a contributor to Model Engineer magazine
- Mike Greenly, American author, journalist, lyricist
- William L. Greenly, American politician

== Places ==
- Greenly Island (South Australia), an island in Australia
  - Greenly Island Conservation Park, includes the above island
- Greenly Island, Canada, an island in Quebec, Canada
- Lake Greenly, a lake in Australia
- Mount Greenly (South Australia), a mountain in Australia

== Other uses ==
- Greenly (company), French climate technology company

== See also ==
- Greenlee County, Arizona
- Grindlay family
