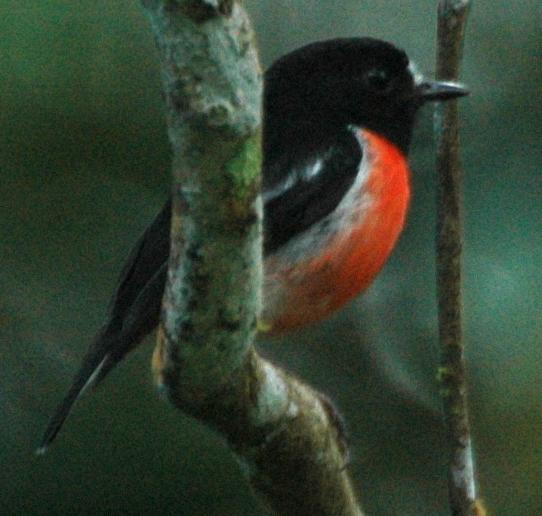
- P. p. kleinschmidti, Viti Levu, Fiji

Conservation status
- Least Concern (IUCN 3.1)

Scientific classification
- Kingdom: Animalia
- Phylum: Chordata
- Class: Aves
- Order: Passeriformes
- Family: Petroicidae
- Genus: Petroica
- Species: P. pusilla

Binomial name
- Petroica pusilla Peale, 1849

Synonyms
- Petroica multicolor

= Pacific robin =

Species of songbird native to islands in southwestern Pacific

The Pacific robin (Petroica pusilla), is a red-breasted Australasian robin in the passerine bird genus Petroica found in Melanesia and Polynesia. It is similar in plumage to the scarlet robin of Australia, and until recently the two were considered conspecific until split in 1999 by Schodde and Mason. Thirteen subspecies of Pacific robin are currently recognised, and these subspecies display considerable variation in plumage, foraging preferences, and habitat. The Norfolk robin was previously considered a subspecies of the Pacific robin, but is now considered a distinct species.

== Taxonomy ==
The Pacific robin was originally described by German naturalist Johann Friedrich Gmelin in 1789 from a collection in Norfolk Island. It was considered conspecific with the scarlet robin of Australia until split in 1999 by Schodde and Mason. It forms a species group along with the scarlet robin and the tomtit of New Zealand. It was further split from the Norfolk robin in 2015. Since the Norfolk birds were discovered first, the Norfolk robin presumed the specific name multicolor, with the Pacific group talking the next earliest name of pusilla. The nominate subspecies of Pacific robin, found in Samoa, was described by American naturalist Titian Peale in 1848.

The generic name Petroica is derived from the Ancient Greek words petros 'stone' and oikos 'home'. The specific name pusilla derives from the Latin pusillus meaning 'very small'.

It is one of five red- or pink-breasted species of robin in the genus Petroica that are colloquially known as "red robins". Although named after the European robin, it is not closely related to either the European robin or the American robin. Along with the other Australian robins, it was classified for many years as a member of the old world flycatcher family Muscicapidae, before being placed in the whistler family Pachycephalidae. The Australasian robins are now placed in their own family Petroicidae.

Sibley and Alquist's DNA-DNA hybridisation studies placed the robins in a Corvida parvorder comprising many tropical and Australian passerines, including pardalotes, fairy-wrens, and honeyeaters, as well as crows. However, subsequent molecular research (and current consensus) places the robins as a very early offshoot of the Passerida ("advanced" songbirds).

=== Subspecies ===
Subspecies of Pacific robin
Trinomial name and author	Range	Description and notes
P. p. ambrynensis (Sharpe, 1900)	Espiritu Santo, Aoba, Ambryn, Paama, Lopevi and Tongoa; north and central Vanuatu, and Banks Islands	Like nominate subspecies, but male has less white in the wings, and the female has an orange-red breast. Pronounced sexual dimorphism.
P. p. similis (G.R. Gray, 1860)	Tanna and Aneityum; South Vanuatu	As P. m. ambrynensis, but male has even duller sooty black plumage.
P. p. feminina (Mayr, 1934)	Efate and Emao; central Vanuatu	Male looks more like a female, with brown upperparts and brown plumage encroaching the red breast. The female is lighter than the male, with cinnamon tinge and off-white throat.
P. p. soror (Mayr, 1934)	Vanua Lava; Banks Islands	As P. m. feminina, but darker upperparts and more scarlet on throat.
P. p. cognata (Mayr, 1938)	Erromango; south central Vanuatu	Similar to P. m. soror, but upperparts greyish, and with white in the tail.
P. p. pusilla (Peale, 1848)	Savai'i and Upolu; Samoa	Nominate subspecies; male has sooty black upperparts and head, more white on the wing, and a smaller white patch on forehead.
P. p. kleinschmidti (Finsch, 1876)	Viti Levu and Vanua Levu; Fiji	As P. m. pusilla, but male has larger white forehead patch and darker upperparts; female has much greyer upperparts, and a broad wingbar.
P. p. taveunensis (Holyoak, 1979)	Taveuni; Fiji	Like P. m. kleinschmidti, but male has deeper red on breast and female has brown upperparts.
P. p. becki (Mayr, 1934)	Kadavu; south Fiji	As P. m. kleinschmidti, but male and female have lighter upperparts.

== Description ==
The Pacific robin is a small passerine, 11.5–13.5 cm long and weighing 9–11 g. Over much of its range, it is the smallest species of bird. The plumage of the males and females is dimorphic, and the extent of this varies depending on the subspecies. The male of the nominate race has a black head with a white forehead, a black back and tail, and the wings are also black with a white bar. The breast and belly are red, and the lower belly and rump are white. The female lacks the white forehead and the white bar on the wing; and the black plumage of the male is replaced by dark brown feathers. The breast is a duller red than the male and has more brown on the sides, and the area of white on the rump is also smaller. Both sexes have black legs and bills. Amongst the subspecies, some males have more female-like plumage, for example, P. m. feminina of central Vanuatu; in others, the female more closely resembles the male. The males of P. m. polymorpha of Makira in the Solomon Islands have two different plumage morphs, including one with no white on the forehead, but with an all rufous-brown head. For a complete list of the differences in subspecies plumage, see above.

== Distribution and habitat ==
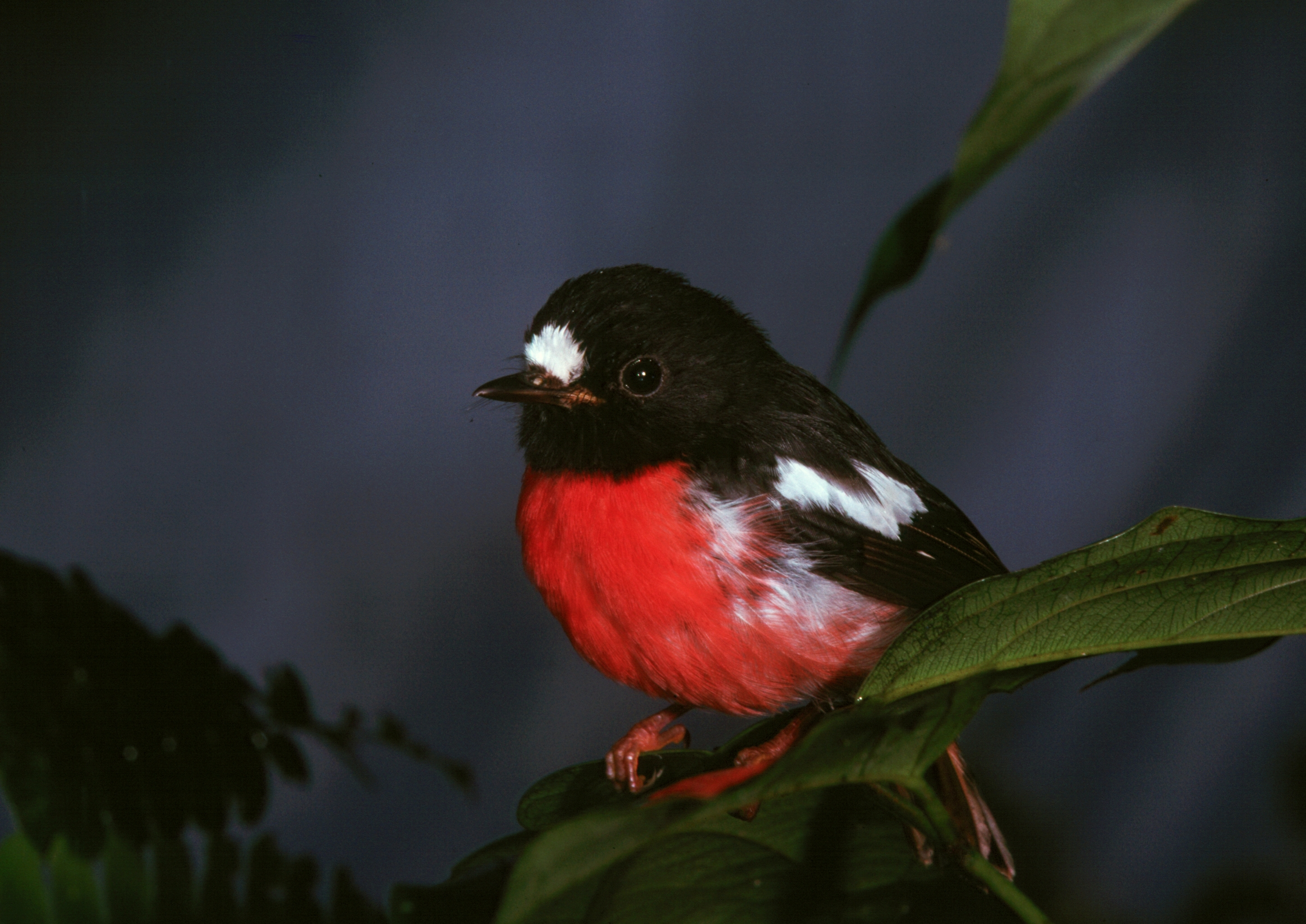
Male Pacific robin, central Viti Levu, Fiji

The Pacific robin inhabits the islands of the southwestern Pacific. It ranges from Bougainville in Papua New Guinea, through the Solomon Islands and Vanuatu, and eastwards to Fiji and Samoa. The species is absent from New Caledonia. Across its range the species is resident, although there may be some small localised movements of birds in the non-breeding season. A fossil found on the islands of Ha'apai in Tonga shows that the species once occurred in the group, but is now extinct there.

== Breeding ==
The Pacific robin is a seasonal breeder, although the timing of the breeding season varies across its range. Information on the timing of the season is patchy or absent for many islands. In Vanuatu, the season is from October to January. Parents with young have been seen in mid-August in the Solomon Islands, and in June through to September in Samoa. The species builds a compact nest, which is a cup of plant fibres and spider webs. The outside of the nest is decorated with moss and lichen, and is, therefore, easily overlooked. The nest is usually set into a fork or stump on a tree branch, or on a horizontal branch.

Around two to four eggs are laid in each clutch, with two or three being typical in Fiji. The eggs are dull grey or greenish, and are incubated by the female. The nests of Pacific robins are parastised by fan-tailed cuckoos, where the two species co-occur.

== Diet and feeding ==
Insects, spiders, and pseudoscorpions make up the bulk of the diet of Pacific robins. They generally feed in the lower sections of the forest, although they will ascend to the forest canopy occasionally. They will join with mixed-species feeding flocks to forage. Prey is obtained by aerial flycatching, gleaning, sallying and pouncing, with different populations favouring different methods.

== Threats and conservation ==
The Pacific robin is not considered globally threatened, and is classified as least concern on the IUCN Red List . Individual subspecies may be threatened by local habitat loss.
