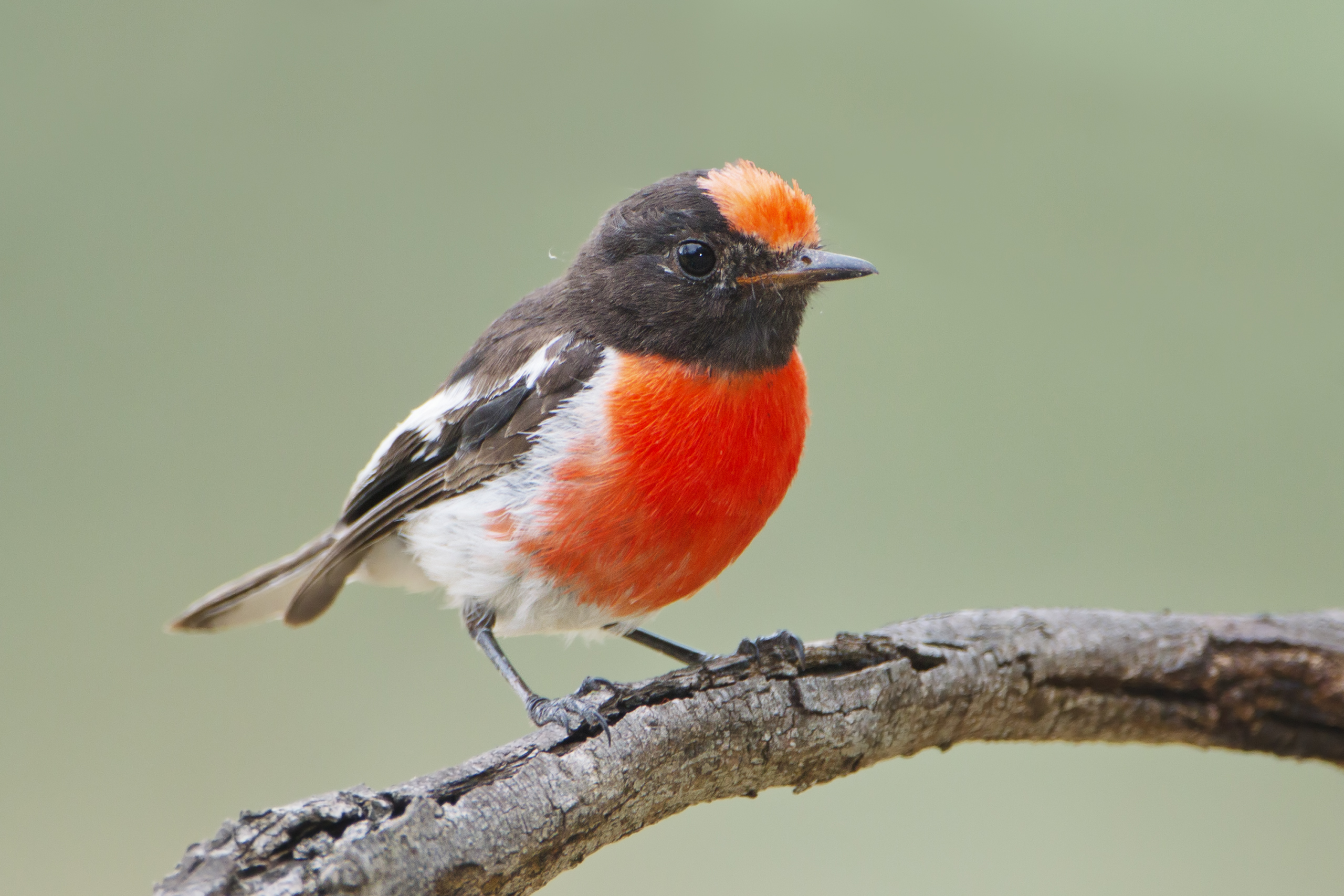
- Adult male at Chiltern, Victoria, Australia

Conservation status
- Least Concern (IUCN 3.1)

Scientific classification
- Kingdom: Animalia
- Phylum: Chordata
- Class: Aves
- Order: Passeriformes
- Family: Petroicidae
- Genus: Petroica
- Species: P. goodenovii

Binomial name
- Petroica goodenovii (Vigors & Horsfield, 1827)
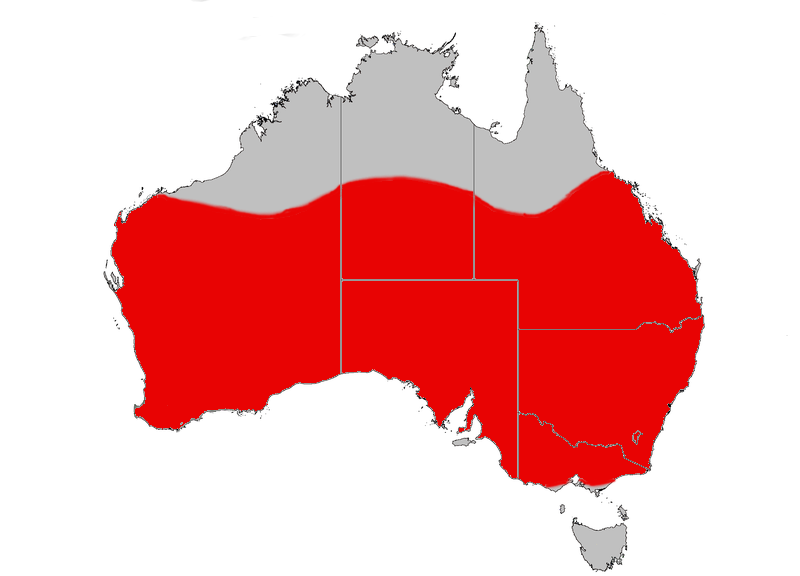
- Red-capped robin range

= Red-capped robin =

Small passerine bird native to Australia

The red-capped robin (Petroica goodenovii) is a small passerine bird native to Australia. Found in drier regions across much of the continent, it inhabits scrub and open woodland. Like many brightly coloured robins of the family Petroicidae, it is sexually dimorphic. Measuring 10.5–12.5 cm (4.1–4.9 in) in length, the robin has a small, thin, black bill, and dark brown eyes and legs. The male has a distinctive red cap and red breast, black upperparts, and a black tail with white tips. The underparts and shoulders are white. The female is an undistinguished grey-brown. This species uses a variety of songs, and males generally sing to advertise territories and attract females. Birds are encountered in pairs or small groups, but the social behaviour has been little studied.

The position of the red-capped robin is unclear; it and its relatives are unrelated to European or American robins, but they appear to be an early offshoot of the songbird infraorder Passerida. The red-capped robin is a predominantly ground-feeding bird, and its prey consists of insects and spiders. Although widespread, it is uncommon in much of its range and has receded in some areas from human activity.

== Taxonomy ==
The red-capped robin was described by Nicholas Aylward Vigors and Thomas Horsfield in 1827, having been collected in the northern Spencer Gulf in South Australia. They named it Muscicapa goodenovii, and placed it among the Old World flycatcher family Muscicapidae. The specific epithet goodenovii honours the Reverend Samuel Goodenough, Bishop of Carlisle and first treasurer of the Linnean Society.

The red-capped robin was later moved to the genus Petroica. The generic name is derived from the Ancient Greek words petros 'rock' and oikos 'home', from the bird's habit of sitting on rocks. Within the genus, it is one of five red- or pink-breasted species colloquially known as "red robins", as distinct from the "yellow robins" of the genus Eopsaltria. It is not closely related to the American robin or the European robin; however, it is named after the European robin. Molecular research (and current consensus) places the red-capped robin and its relatives—the Australian robin family Petroicidae—as a very early offshoot of the Passerida, or "advanced" songbirds, within the songbird lineage.

No subspecies are recognised, and the only geographic variation recorded in plumage is a tendency for females from more arid regions to have paler plumage. Testing of the nuclear and mitochondrial DNA of Australian members of the genus Petroica suggests that the red-capped robin's closest relative within the genus is the scarlet robin.

Officially known as the red-capped robin, it has also been referred to as redhead, redcap, robin red-breast or red-throated robin. Kuburi is a name used in the Kimberley. Across southwestern Australia, it was known as menekedang by the local indigenous people. In the Arandic languages spoken in Central Australia, the red-capped robin is known as ak-arl-atwe-rre-ye meaning "the head that they hit" from an ancient myth of it being hit on the head and bleeding.

== Description ==
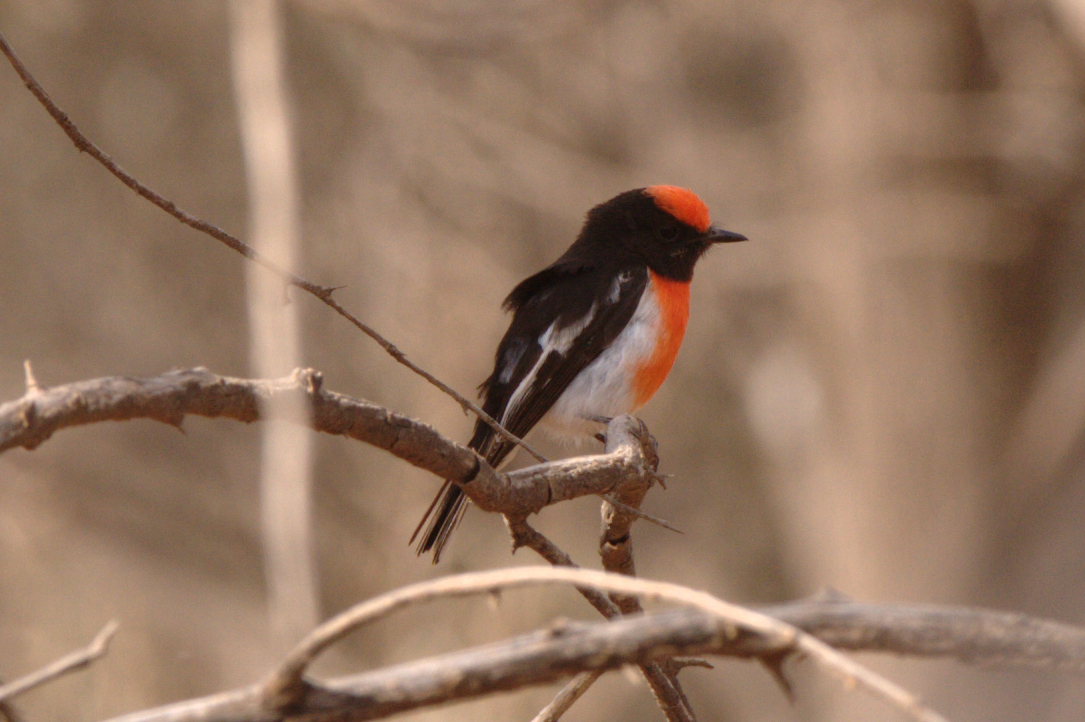
Adult male, showing white shoulder markings

The smallest of the red robins, the red-capped robin is 10.5–12.5 cm (4.1–4.9 in) long with a wingspan of 15–19.5 cm (5.9–7.7 in), and weighs around 7–9 g (0.25–0.31 oz). Males and females are of similar size. It has longer legs than the other robins of the genus Petroica. The male has a distinctive scarlet cap and breast. Its upperparts are jet-black with white shoulder bars, and its tail is black with white tips. The underparts and shoulder are white. All colours are sharply delineated from one another. The female is an undistinguished grey-brown above with a reddish tint to the crown, and paler underneath with dark brown wings and pale buff wing-patch. Some females have a reddish tint to the breast. Both sexes have a small, black bill, and dark brown eyes and legs. Immature birds initially resemble the female; it is only with their second moult, which takes place at around a year of age that males adopt their distinctive adult plumage. The red-capped robin moults once a year, after the breeding season, which takes place between December and April.

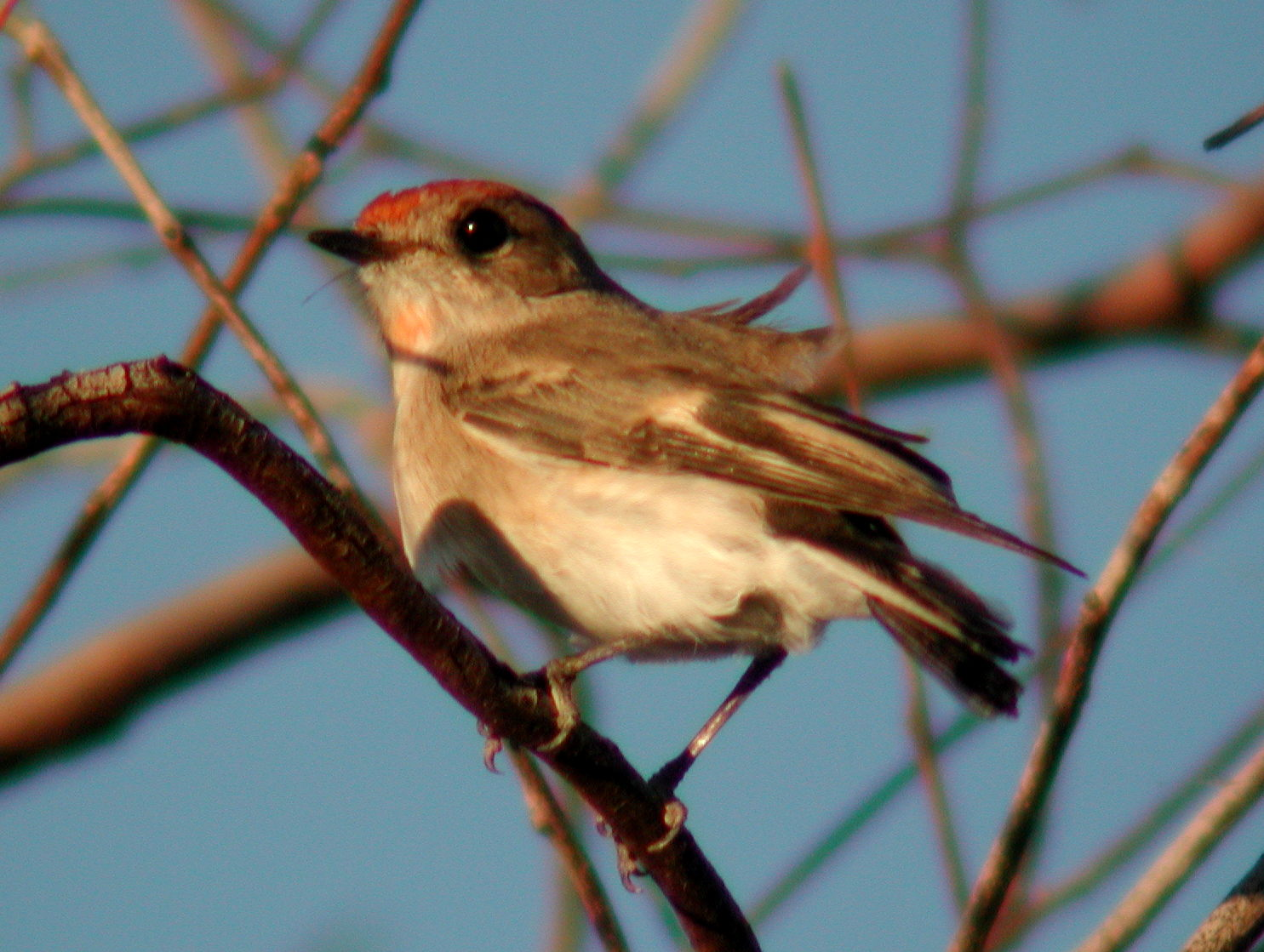
Female (or immature), southwestern Queensland

Two red keto-carotenoid pigments, canthaxanthin and adonirubin, are responsible for the redness in the red-capped robin's plumage. The birds are unable to synthesize these compounds themselves, and hence need to obtain them from their food. Carotenoids are costly to metabolise, and are also required for use in immune function, hence red-capped robins need to be in good condition to have enough left for use in red feathers. This makes red plumage a good advertisement to prospective mates. A 2001 field study at Terrick Terrick National Park in Victoria found that males, which had greater reproductive success and were in better condition, moulted into a brighter plumage the following year. However, male age and condition at the time were more likely to predict mating success for the following breeding season. Adult males can breed at one year of age, and may do so while yet in non-breeding plumage, but they are less successful at reproducing at this age. The oldest recorded age is 5 years and 7 months for a bird banded near Beverley, Western Australia, in 1990.

A variety of calls have been recorded, described as 'tinkle' and 'blurt' songs. These are similar across mainland Australia but distinct on Rottnest Island; on the isolated island, birds rarely linked successive songs.

This species may be confused with the related flame robin (P. phoenicea) and scarlet robin (P. boodang), but the male can be distinguished by its red crown (white in the other two species) and smaller size; furthermore, the male flame robin has dark grey rather than black upperparts. Female and immature birds are harder to distinguish, but can be differentiated by the reddish tinge of the crown and whiter underparts.

== Distribution and habitat ==
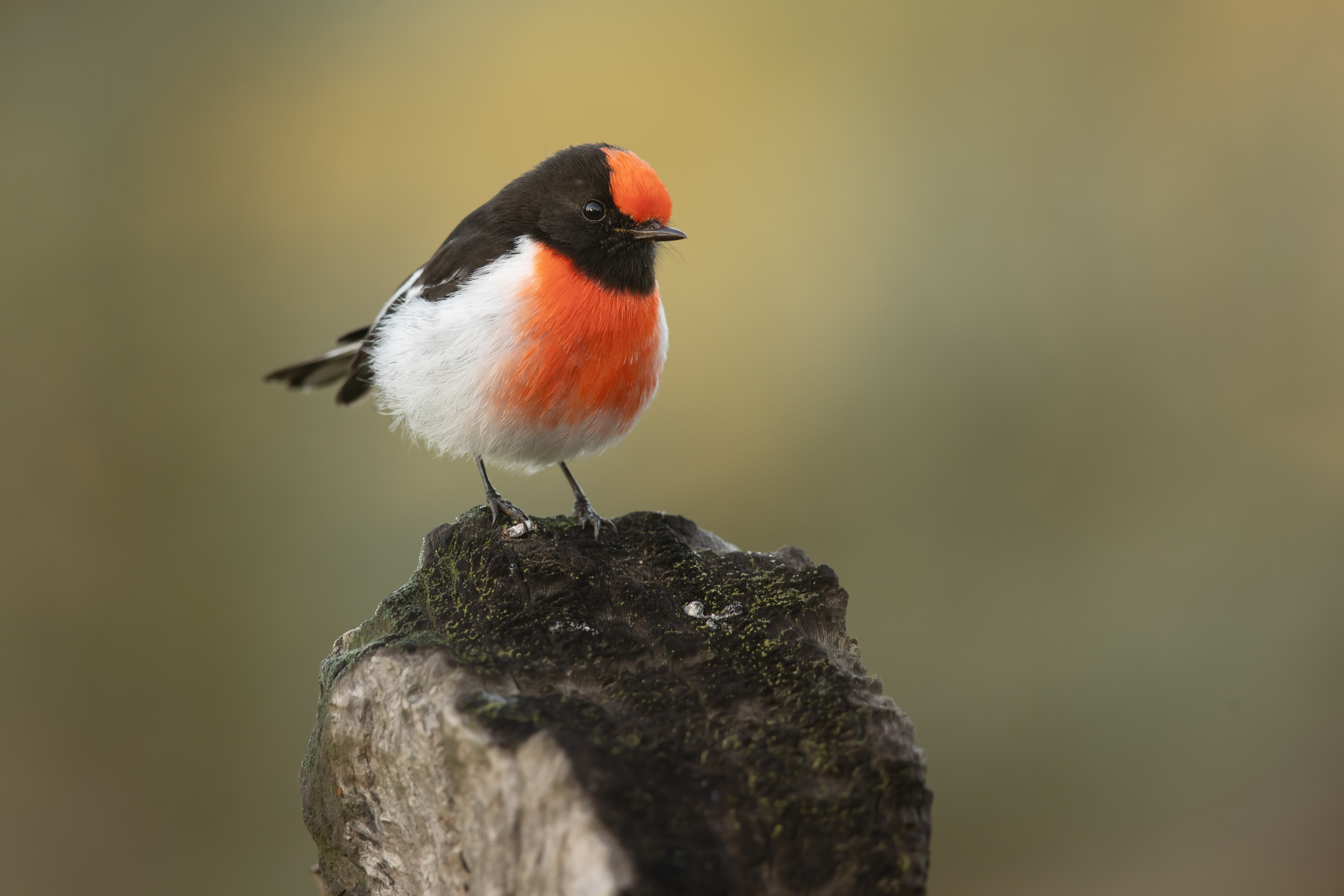
Red-capped Robin in New South Wales

The red-capped robin is found across Australia, except for Tasmania, Cape York, the Top End, and most of the Kimberley (there have been occasional sightings in the southernmost parts). Offshore populations exist on Rottnest Island, as well as Greenly and Pearson Islands off the Eyre Peninsula, but it is not found on Kangaroo Island. Although widespread, it is uncommon in many areas; it is rare east of the Great Dividing Range, in coastal regions in the south of the continent, and in the northern parts of its range—it is seldom encountered north of 20°S. Its movements are generally poorly known, particularly outside the breeding season. It is sedentary in much of the southern parts of its range, although the red-capped robin is a spring and summer visitor to the Nullarbor Plain and Adelaide region in South Australia, and central Victoria. It is a winter visitor in the northern parts of its range.

The red-capped robin prefers more arid habitat than its relatives, and inhabits drier areas, while the scarlet robin occupies wetter forests, where they co-occur. The red-capped robin's preferred habitat is dry Acacia, Callitris, or mixed scrubland or woodland, dominated by such species as mulga (Acacia aneura), Georgina gidgee (Acacia georginae), raspberry jam (Acacia acuminata), black cypress-pine (Callitris endlicheri), white cypress-pine (C. columellaris), and slender cypress-pine (C. preissii) with understory shrubs, such as Cassinia, hop-bush (Dodonaea), emu bush (Eremophila), and spinifex (Triodia).

=== Threats ===
The species has generally fared badly with human change to the landscape. Once common on the Cumberland Plain in Sydney's western suburbs, it has now almost disappeared from the Sydney Basin. It has also disappeared from the vicinity of Rockhampton in Queensland, and declined on Rottnest Island, and in the Wheatbelt region of Western Australia. Field studies in small patches of remnant vegetation indicate reduced survival rates there.

The feral cat is known to prey on the red-capped robin, and several bird species, including the Australian raven (Corvus coronoides), grey shrike-thrush (Colluricincla harmonica), grey butcherbird (Cracticus torquatus), and white-browed babbler (Pomatostomus superciliosus) raid nests and take young. There is one record of a brown-headed honeyeater (Melithreptus brevirostris) feeding on an egg. Predation is the commonest cause of nest failure.

== Behaviour ==
Male in breeding plumage vocalising, Eulo in southwestern Queensland

The red-capped robin is generally encountered alone or in pairs, although groups of up to eight birds—a mated pair and their young—may be seen in autumn and winter. The species may join mixed-species flocks with other small insectivorous passerines; species recorded include the willie wagtail (Rhipidura leucophrys), southern whiteface (Aphelocephala leucopsis), rufous whistler (Pachycephala rufiventris) and black-faced woodswallow (Artamus cinereus) in Queensland, and the chestnut-rumped thornbill (Acanthiza uropygialis), buff-rumped thornbill (A. reguloides) or inland thornbill (A. apicalis) in Western Australia.

The red-capped robin typically perches in a prominent location low to the ground, often flicking its wings and tail. It is very active and does not stay still for long. The female has been reported as being fairly tame, while the male is more wary of human contact.

The red-capped robin is territorial during the breeding season; the area occupied has been measured between 0.25 and 1.2 ha (0.6–3 acres). A pair lives and forages within their territory before dispersing in autumn. The male proclaims ownership by singing loudly from a suitable perch at the territory boundary, and confronts other males with a harsh scolding call should they make an incursion. Two males have been seen to face one another 30 to 1 m (98.4 to 3.3 ft) apart, flicking wings and manoeuvring for position in a threat display, while the female is incubating her eggs. Both sexes also react to the playback of song recordings. The male will also defend against incursions by male scarlet robins, and conversely avoid foraging in the latter species' territories. Most juvenile red-capped robins are unable to live in territories occupied by adult birds, and need to travel to find unoccupied land; the furthest dispersal recorded to date has been 36 km (22 mi), from Terrick Terrick National Park across farmland to Gunbower National Park in northern Victoria.

=== Breeding ===
The breeding season takes place over five months from August to January with up to three broods raised. The male proposes suitable nest sites to the female by rubbing his body over a suitable tree fork, all the while trilling continuously. He may indicate several sites before the female ultimately makes the decision where to build, at which point she constructs the nest alone. The nest is a neat, deep cup, made of soft dry grass and bark. Spider webs, feathers, and fur are used for binding or filling, and the nest is generally placed in a tree fork, or sometimes a mistletoe bush. It may be decorated with lichen and camouflaged to blend in with its surroundings. Two to three dull white eggs tinted bluish, greyish or brownish, and splotched with dark grey-brown, are laid on consecutive days, with each egg measuring 16 mm × 13 mm (0.63 in × 0.51 in). Females alone develop brood patches and incubate, although both sexes feed the young. The male will keep lookout either on the nest or perched on a nearby branch, rather than brood, while the female is foraging; and both parents will feed young and dart off quickly, if there are predators in the vicinity. Extra-pair mating and fertilisation is fairly common, with 23% of nestlings and 37% of broods having a different father to the one rearing them, and there is some evidence that extra-pair couplings are more likely to produce male birds.

Like all passerines, the chicks are altricial; they are born blind and covered only by a thin layer of down. By seven days, they are stretching wings and preening, and at two weeks they are able to fly. Parents feed young for at least three weeks after leaving the nest, and have been recorded giving them spiders, and insects, such as flies and moths. Males take over feeding young when females begin renesting for the next brood. In a field study near Cooma, in southern New South Wales, fledglings were observed to disperse from the natal territory after four to six weeks for a single-brood year; and fledglings dispersed in less than a week from the territory of a pair that raised two broods in the season. The long breeding season and multiple broods therein are an adaptation to mild climate and high levels of predation. Despite this, on average, only two young are successfully fledged per year.

The brush cuckoo (Cacomantis variolosus), pallid cuckoo (C. pallidus), Horsfield's bronze-cuckoo (Chrysococcyx basalis), and black-eared cuckoo (C. osculans) have been recorded as brood parasites of the red-capped robin; female cuckoos lay their eggs in robin nests, which are then raised by the robins as their own. Red-capped robins have been observed to be particularly aggressive in driving Horsfield's bronze-cuckoos from their territories in Terrick Terrick National Park in a field study, and no nests were found parasitised there.

=== Feeding ===
The diet consists of insects and other small arthropods. One study of red-capped robin faeces conducted near Kambalda, Western Australia, revealed 96% of their diet was made up of beetles, while ants made up the remainder. Other prey recorded include spiders, and insects such as grasshoppers, including the Australian plague locust (Chortoicetes terminifera), adult and larval butterflies and moths, including geometer moths, dragonflies and damselflies, mantises, antlions, true bugs, including chinch bugs of the family Lygaeidae and shield bugs, various types of beetles, earwigs, and flies such as blow-flies and horse-flies.

The red-capped robin mostly pounces on prey on the ground, although it can swoop and catch creatures while airborne. Less often, it gleans (takes prey while perched) in low-lying vegetation, almost always less than 3 m (9.8 ft) above the ground. The prey is most commonly on the ground when caught, although airborne insects are sometimes taken. A low branch may be used as a vantage point in hunting.

== Cited Texts ==
- Boles, Walter E. (1988). The Robins and Flycatchers of Australia. Sydney: Angus & Robertson. ISBN 0-207-15400-7.
- Higgins, Peter J.; Peter, Jeffrey M., eds. (2002). Handbook of Australian, New Zealand and Antarctic Birds. Volume 6: Pardalotes to Shrike-thrushes. Melbourne: Oxford University Press. ISBN 0-19-553762-9.
- "Red-capped Robin". Birds in Backyards. Australian Museum.
