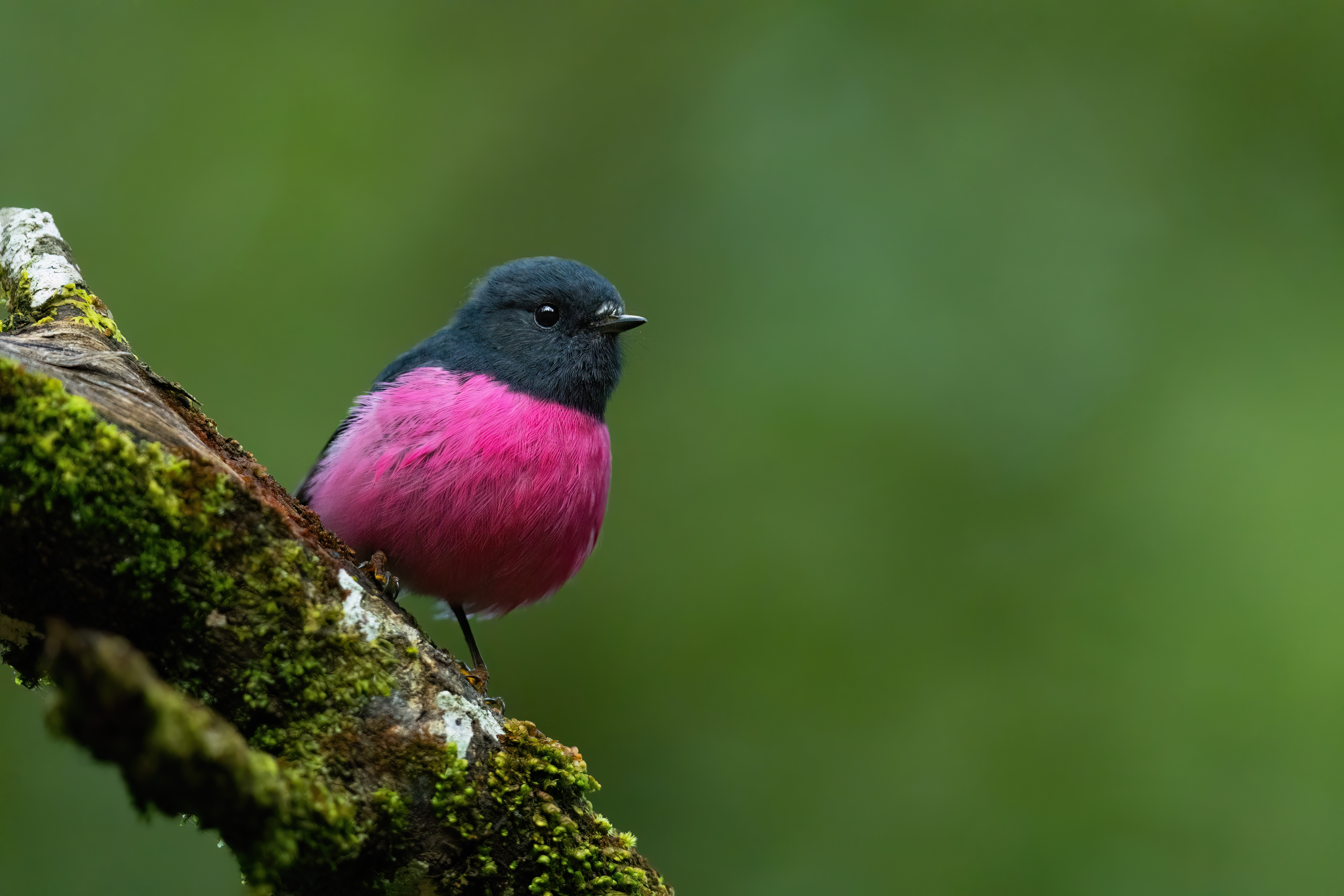

Conservation status
- Least Concern (IUCN 3.1)

Scientific classification
- Kingdom: Animalia
- Phylum: Chordata
- Class: Aves
- Order: Passeriformes
- Family: Petroicidae
- Genus: Petroica
- Species: P. rodinogaster

Binomial name
- Petroica rodinogaster (Drapiez, 1819)

Audio
- Male pink robin calling

= Pink robin =

Species of songbird native to southeastern Australia

The pink robin (Petroica rodinogaster) is a small passerine bird native to southeastern Australia. Its natural habitats are cool temperate forests of far southeastern Australia. Like many brightly coloured robins of the family Petroicidae, it is sexually dimorphic. Measuring 13.5 cm (5.3 in) in length, the robin has a small, thin, black bill, and dark brown eyes and legs. The male has a distinctive white forehead spot and pink breast, with grey-black upperparts, wings and tail. The belly is white. The female has grey-brown plumage. The position of the pink robin and its Australian relatives on the passerine family tree is unclear; the Petroicidae are not closely related to either the European or American robins, but appear to be an early offshoot of the Passerida group of songbirds.

== Taxonomy ==
Described by Belgian naturalist Auguste Drapiez in 1819, the pink robin is a member of the Australasian robin family Petroicidae. Sibley and Ahlquist's DNA-DNA hybridisation studies placed this group in a Corvida parvorder comprising many tropical and Australian passerines, including pardalotes, fairy-wrens, honeyeaters, and crows. However, subsequent molecular research (and current consensus) places the robins as a very early offshoot of the Passerida (or "advanced" songbirds) within the songbird lineage. Testing of the nuclear and mitochondrial DNA of Australian members of the genus Petroica suggests that the pink and rose robins are each other's closest relative within the genus.

The generic name Petroica derives from the Ancient Greek petros 'stone' and oikos 'house'. The specific name rodinogaster derives from the Ancient Greek rhodinos 'pink' and gaster 'belly'.

== Description ==
The pink robin is 13.5 cm (5.5 in) long and displays sexual dimorphism – the males and females have plumage which differ markedly. The male has a dark blackish-grey head, throat, back, wings and tail, a pink breast and belly fading to white on the lower abdomen, and a white forehead. The female is dark grey-brown above, with two buff-coloured wing-bars and pinkish-tinged underparts. The bill and feet are black, and the eyes are dark brown.

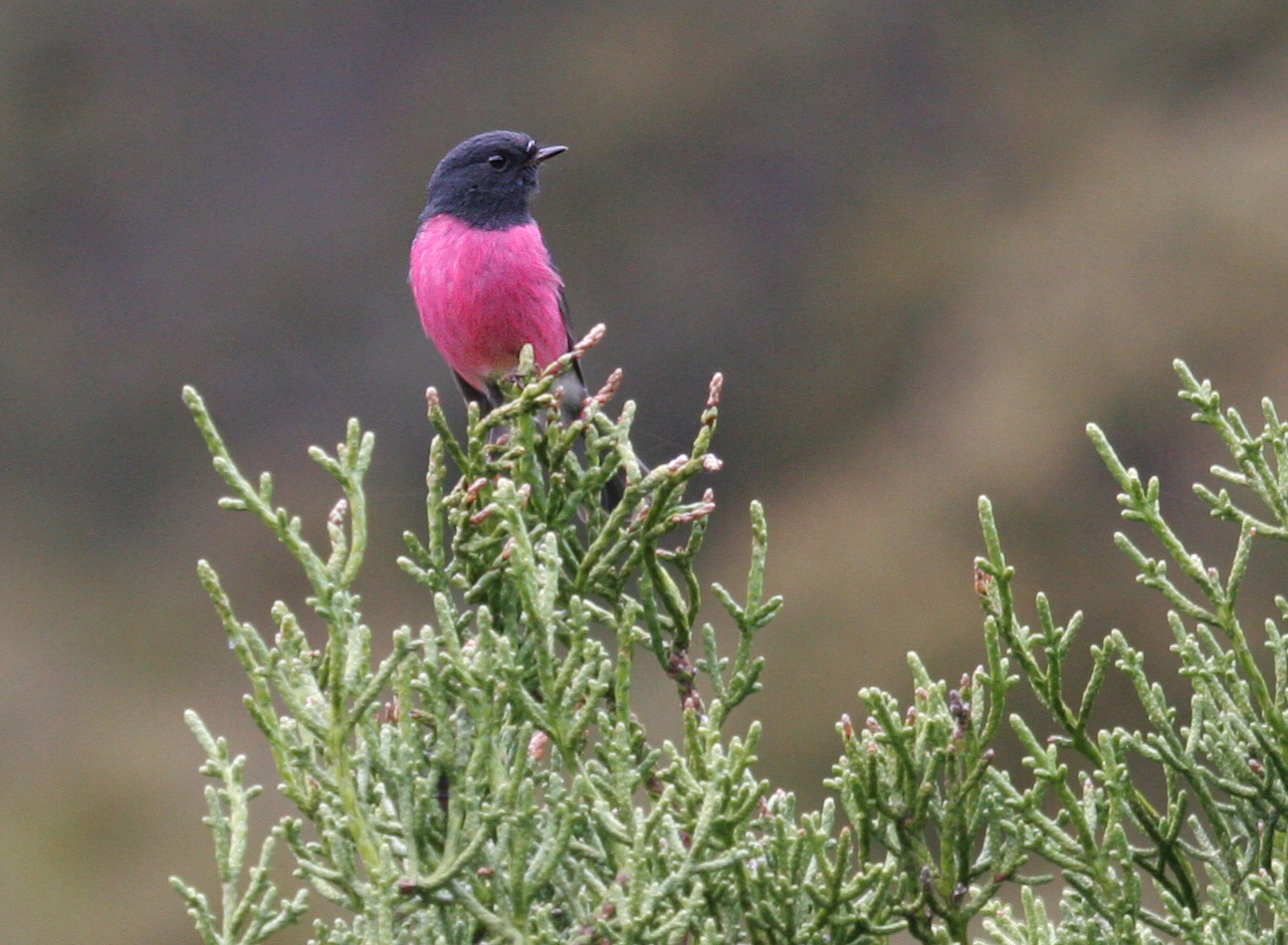
Pink Robin, Tasmania

== Distribution and habitat ==
Its range is the forests of southern Victoria and neighbouring parts of South Australia and New South Wales, and Tasmania.

== Breeding ==
Breeding occurs from September to January. The nest is a well-made, neat, deep cup of moss. Spider webs, feathers and fur are used for binding or filling, and the nest is generally placed in a tree fork up to 5 m (15 ft) above the ground. A clutch of three or four eggs is laid. The eggs, which measure 18 by 14 mm, are greyish-, greenish- or blueish-white, and are marked with dark brown and lavender splotches and spots, usually concentrated around the large end.

== Feeding ==
Prey consists of a variety of spiders and insects, including caterpillars, ichneumon wasps, beetles, flies and ants.
