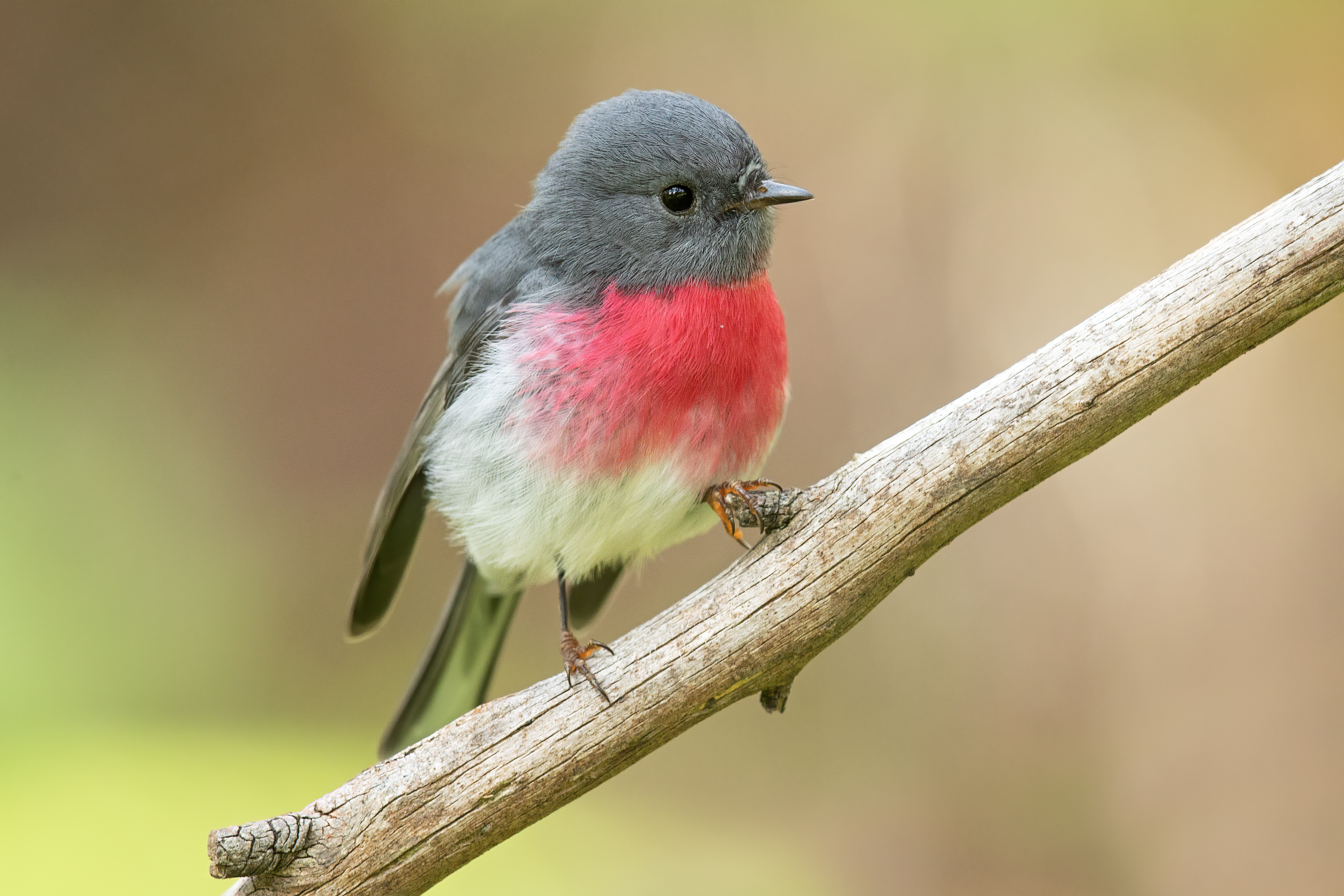
- Male

Conservation status
- Least Concern (IUCN 3.1)

Scientific classification
- Kingdom: Animalia
- Phylum: Chordata
- Class: Aves
- Order: Passeriformes
- Family: Petroicidae
- Genus: Petroica
- Species: P. rosea

Binomial name
- Petroica rosea Gould, 1840
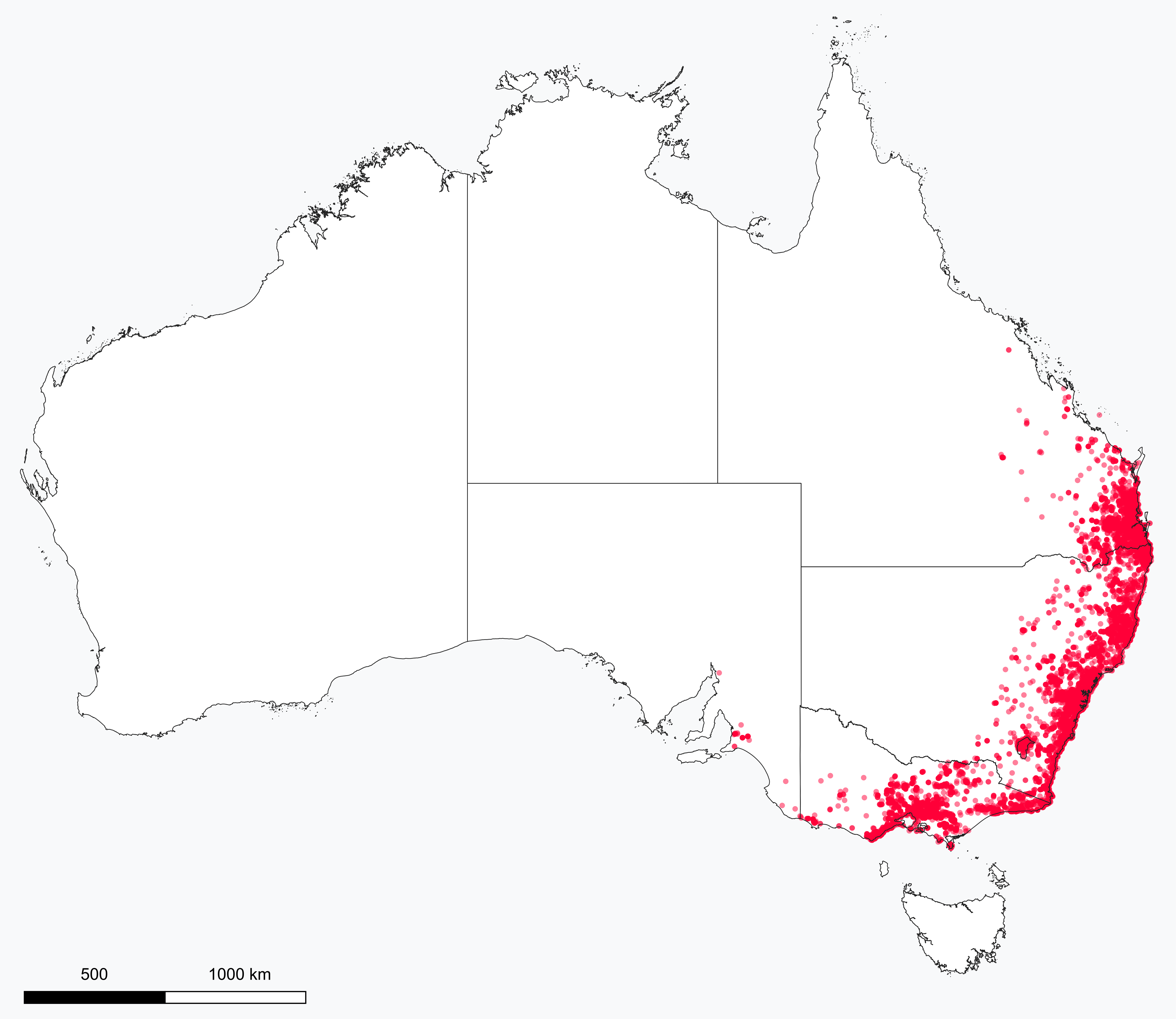
- Species distribution

= Rose robin =

Species of songbird native to southeastern Australia

The rose robin (Petroica rosea) is a small passerine bird native to Australia. Like many brightly coloured robins of the Petroicidae, it is sexually dimorphic. The male has a distinctive pink breast. Its upperparts are dark grey with white frons, and its tail black with white tips. The underparts and shoulder are white. The female is an undistinguished grey-brown. The robin has a small black bill and eyes.

It is endemic to Australia east or south of the Great Dividing Range, from Queensland through to southeastern South Australia. Its natural habitats are the gullies and valleys of temperate forests and subtropical or tropical moist lowland forests.

== Taxonomy ==
Like all Australian robins, the rose robin is not closely related to either the European robin or the American robin, but belongs rather to the Corvida parvorder comprising many tropical and Australian passerines, including pardalotes, fairywrens and honeyeaters, as well as crows. It belongs to the genus Petroica, whose Australian members are known colloquially as "red robins" as distinct from the "yellow robins" of the genus Eopsaltria. It was first described by ornithologist John Gould in 1840, with its specific epithet derived from the Latin roseus 'pink'. Testing of the nuclear and mitochondrial DNA of Australian members of the genus Petroica suggests that the rose and pink robins are each other's closest relative within the genus.

== Description ==
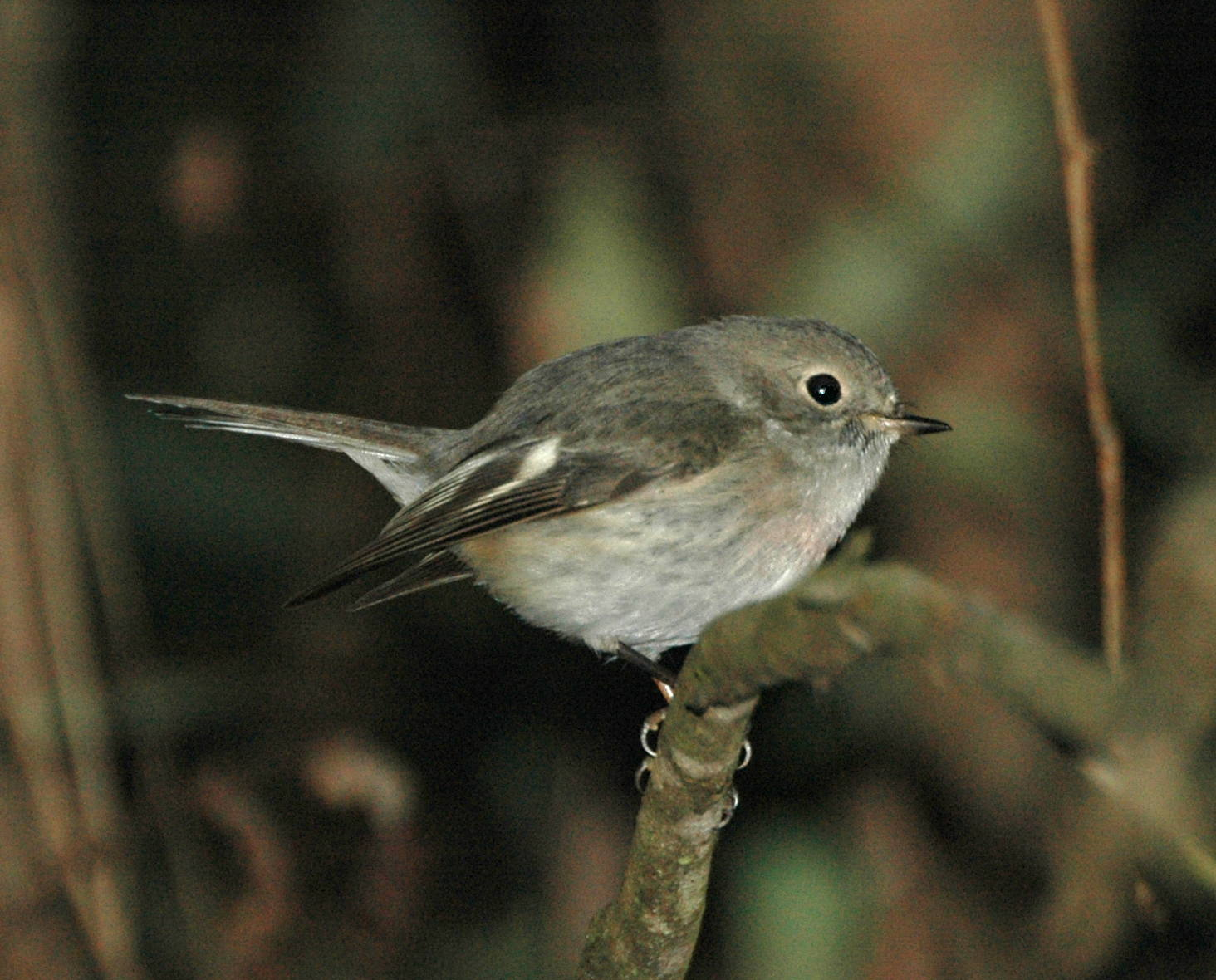
Female in Kobble Creek, southeast Queensland, Australia

Adult birds are around 11 cm (4.3 in) in length. The male rose robin has a pink breast and abdomen, with dark grey head, throat, back and tail. The frons and outer tail shafts are white. There is no white wing bar. The female is plain-coloured; pale grey-brown above, and grey-white underneath, with small white marks on the wings and over the bill. The bill, legs and eyes are black. Both the male and female make a tick call.

== Distribution and habitat ==
The rose robin occurs in eastern and southeastern Australia, from Rockhampton east of the Great Dividing Range through eastern New South Wales and Victoria into southeastern South Australia. It does not occur in Tasmania. It is found in wet sclerophyll forest and rainforest, where it inhabits gullies and valleys, dispersing to drier forest in cooler months. The rose robin is vulnerable to development and clearing of forested areas, which has led to it disappearing in these areas. Populations have been recorded in conservation areas, namely the Dandenong Creek, Scotchmans Creek and Gardiners Creek Corridors, in Melbourne's eastern suburbs.

== Behaviour ==
Found in ones or twos, rose robins tend to feed in the tops of trees. Insects and spiders form the bulk of the diet, with most being caught while the robin is flying. Unlike other robins, the rose robin does not return to the same branch while foraging. Prey consists of a variety of spiders and insects, including caterpillars, wasps, bugs such as cicadas and chinch bugs, beetles such as jewel beetles, leaf beetles, leaf-eating beetles and weevils, flies and ants.

== Breeding ==
Breeding season is from September to January with one or two broods raised. The nest is a neat, deep cup made of bits of moss and fern. Spider webs, feathers and fur are used for binding/filling, while lichen is placed on the nest exterior. The nest is generally situated in the fork of a large tree some 10–20 m (33–66 ft) above the ground. Two or three dull white eggs tinted bluish, greyish or brownish, and splotched with dark grey-brown, are laid. The eggs measure 17 mm x 13 mm. The rose robin has been parasitised by the pallid cuckoo (Cuculus pallidus), brush cuckoo (Cacomantis variolosus) and Horsfield's bronze cuckoo (Chrysococcyx basalis).
