= Lake Greenly =

- Puwanna
- Puwanna
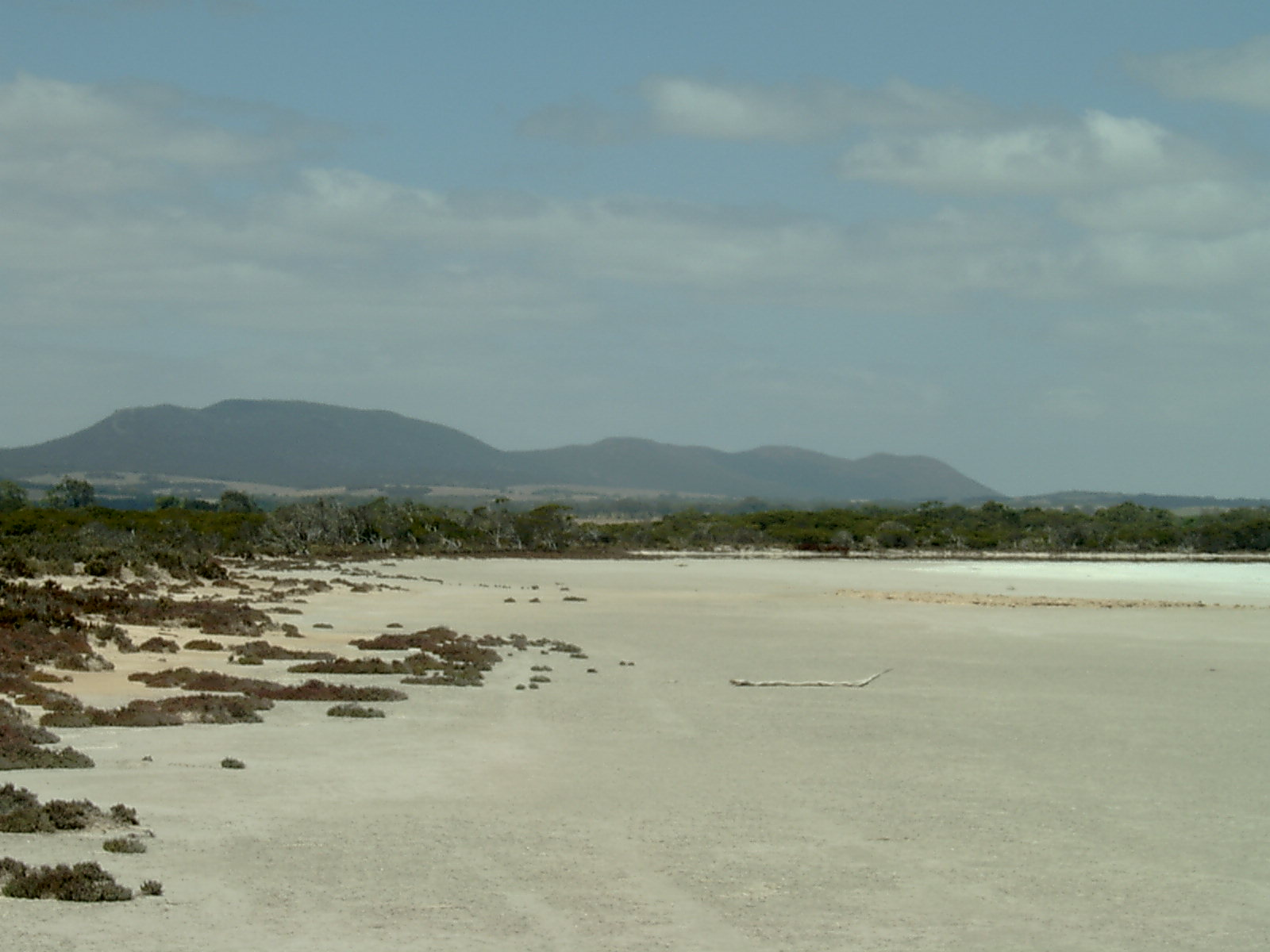
- Lake Greenly

- Location within Australia
- Location: Coulta, South Australia, Australia
- Coordinates: 34°20′17″S 135°24′59″E
- Type: lake
- Surface area: 22 square kilometres (8.5 mi^{2})
- Average depth: 4 metres (13 ft)
- Water volume: 0.09 cubic kilometres (73,000 acre⋅ft)
- Shore length^{1}: 22 kilometres (14 mi)
- Surface elevation: 30 metres (98 ft)
- ^{1} Shore length is not a well-defined measure.

Lake Greenly (Nauo: Buwana) is a body of water in Australia.

== Location ==
Lake Greenly is in the locality of Coulta on the Lower Eyre Peninsula in the state of South Australia, and 1,300 kilometres (810 mi) west of the Australian capital city, Canberra. It is located near Mount Greenly.

== Hydrology ==
Lake Greenly is a natural lake that covers a surface area of 22 square kilometres (8.5 mi^{2}), has an average depth of 4 metres (13 ft). Lake Greenly boasts a total water volume of 0.09 cubic kilometres (73,000 acre⋅ft), and has a total shore line of 22 kilometres (14 mi). The lake, which sits at an elevation of 30 metres (98 ft), drains a watershed that covers 399 square kilometres (154 mi^{2}).

== See also ==
- Greenly Island (South Australia)
- Mount Greenly, South Australia
