= Mountain robin =

Conservation status
- Least Concern (IUCN 3.1)

Scientific classification
- Kingdom: Animalia
- Phylum: Chordata
- Class: Aves
- Order: Passeriformes
- Family: Petroicidae
- Genus: Petroica
- Species: P. bivittata

Binomial name
- Petroica bivittata De Vis, 1897

Species of songbird native to New Guinea

The mountain robin (Petroica bivittata), also known as subalpine robin, alpine robin or cloud-forest robin, is a species of bird in the family Petroicidae. It is found sparsely throughout the New Guinea Highlands.

Its natural habitat is subtropical or tropical moist montane forests and subalpine shrubland. The robin eats insects, caught in flight.

Two subspecies have been noted, Petroica bivittata bivittata and Petroica bivittata caudata.
