= Solomons robin =

Scientific classification
- Kingdom: Animalia
- Phylum: Chordata
- Class: Aves
- Order: Passeriformes
- Family: Petroicidae
- Genus: Petroica
- Species: P. polymorpha

Binomial name
- Petroica polymorpha Mayr, 1934

Species of bird

The Solomons robin (Petroica polymorpha) is a species of bird in the family Petroicidae. It is native to the Solomon Islands archipelago.

Its natural habitat is subtropical or tropical moist montane forests and subalpine shrubland.

== Subspecies ==
Subspecies of Solomons robin
Trinomial name and author	Range	Description and notes
P. p. polymorpha (Mayr, 1934)	Marika; Solomon Islands	The males are dimorphic, some with black and some with rufous heads, lacking the white forehead; the female resembles the rufous headed male, but duller.
P. p. septentrionalis (Mayr, 1934)	Bougainville; Papua New Guinea	Male identical to black headed morph of P. m. polymorpha; female has more rufous upperparts and some white in the wing.
P. p. kulambangrae (Mayr, 1934)	Kolombangara; west Solomon Islands	Male same as P. m. septentrionalis; female has reddish upperparts and deeper red breast.
P. p. dennisi (Cain & I.C.J Galbraith, 1955)	Guadalcanal; south Solomon Islands	Male same as black-morph P. m. polymorpha; female has olive-brown crown and blacker back and wings.
