= Snow Mountain robin =

Conservation status
- Near Threatened (IUCN 3.1)

Scientific classification
- Kingdom: Animalia
- Phylum: Chordata
- Class: Aves
- Order: Passeriformes
- Family: Petroicidae
- Genus: Petroica
- Species: P. archboldi

Binomial name
- Petroica archboldi Rand, 1940

Species of songbird native to New Guinea

The Snow Mountain robin (Petroica archboldi), also known as the Snow Mountains robin, is a species of bird in the family Petroicidae. It is endemic to West Papua, Indonesia.

== Distribution and habitat ==
The Snow Mountain robin is only found in Puncak Trikora and the Freeport McMoran Grasberg gold mine, both near Puncak Jaya. Public access into these areas are restricted. This bird occurs between 3,850 and 4,150 metres (12,630 and 13,620 ft) in rocky slopes with no trees, since this bird doesn't occur on or near the tree line, where most other robin species live.

== Characteristics ==
The Snow Mountain robin has slaty-grey plumage, darker wings, a white spot on its forehead, and, most prominently, a large crimson spot on the breast, which makes it easily recognizable.

== Behaviour ==
Generally social birds, Snow Mountain robins live in small groups of a few individuals. They feed on insects among the rocks on grassy slopes.
