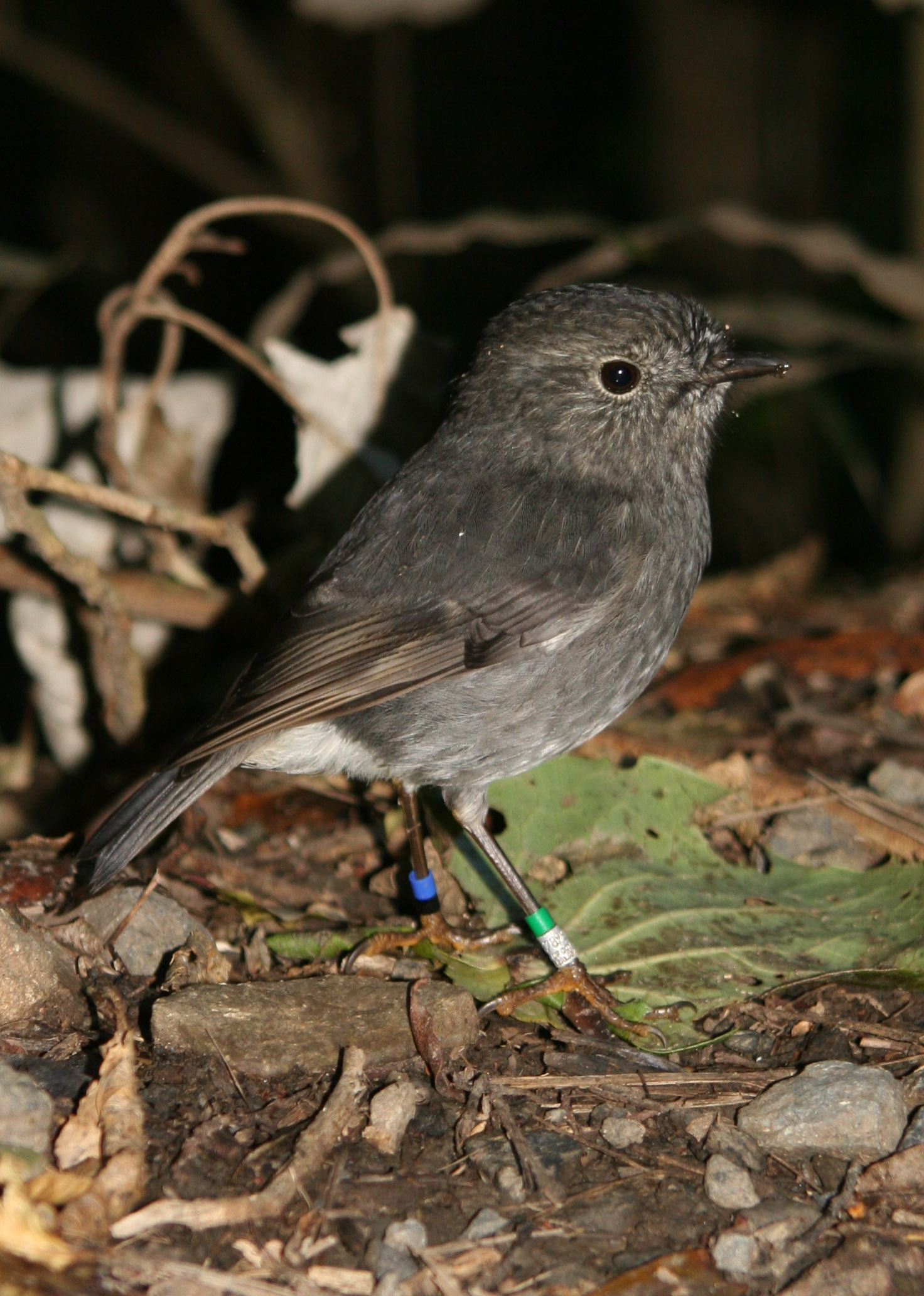
- North Island robin (Petroica longipes)

Scientific classification
- Kingdom: Animalia
- Phylum: Chordata
- Class: Aves
- Order: Passeriformes
- Family: Petroicidae
- Genus: Petroica; Swainson, 1829

Type species
- Muscicapa multicolor Gmelin, 1789

Species
- 14; see text

= Petroica =

Genus of birds

Petroica is a genus of Australasian robins, named for their red and pink markings. They are not closely related to the European robins nor the American robins.

== Taxonomy ==
The genus was introduced by the English naturalist, William Swainson, in 1829, with the Norfolk robin (Petroica multicolor) as the type species. The generic name combines the Ancient Greek petro- "rock" with oikos "home".

Many species in Australia have a red breast and are known colloquially as "red robins" as distinct from the "yellow robins" of the genus Eopsaltria.

== Species and subspecies ==
The genus contains the following 14 species:

Male	Female	Common name	Scientific name	Distribution
		Rose robin	Petroica rosea	Australia.
		Pink robin	Petroica rodinogaster	Tasmania, southern Australia
		Snow Mountains robin	Petroica archboldi	West Papua, Indonesia.
		Mountain robin	Petroica bivittata	New Guinea Highlands
		Flame robin	Petroica phoenicea	south-eastern Australia, including Tasmania
		Solomons robin	Petroica polymorpha	Solomon Islands.
		Pacific robin	Petroica pusilla	Melanesia and Polynesia.
		Norfolk robin	Petroica multicolor	Norfolk Island, an Australian territory in the Tasman Sea, between Australia and New Zealand
		Scarlet robin	Petroica boodang	Australia, including Tasmania.
		Red-capped robin	Petroica goodenovii	Australia.
		Tomtit	Petroica macrocephala	New Zealand
		North Island robin	Petroica longipes	North Island of New Zealand.
		South Island robin	Petroica australis	New Zealand
		Black robin	Petroica traversi	the Chatham Islands
