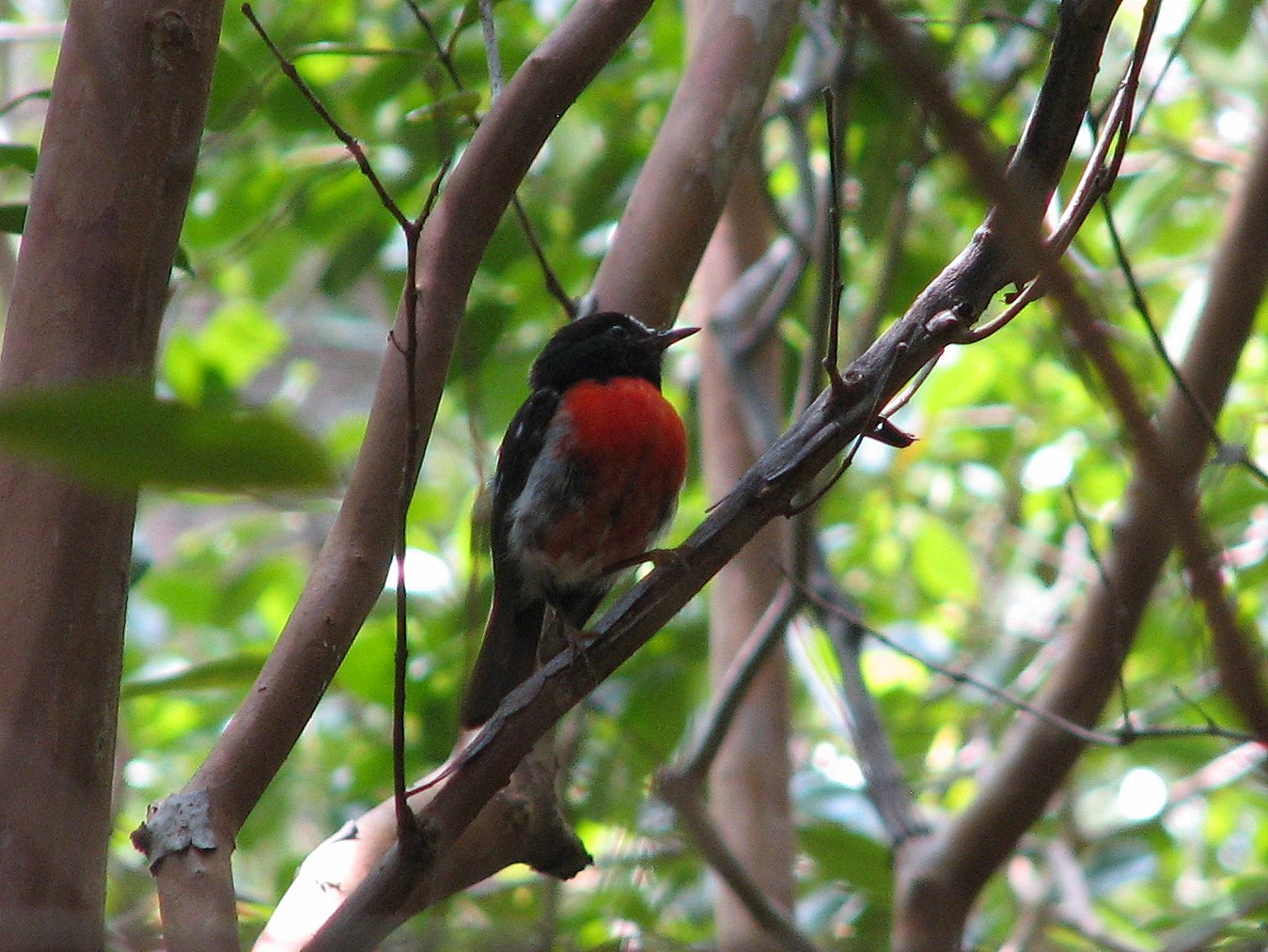
- On Norfolk Island, Australia

Conservation status
- Endangered (IUCN 3.1)

Scientific classification
- Kingdom: Animalia
- Phylum: Chordata
- Class: Aves
- Order: Passeriformes
- Family: Petroicidae
- Genus: Petroica
- Species: P. multicolor

Binomial name
- Petroica multicolor (Gmelin, JF, 1789)

Synonyms
- Muscicapa multicolor

= Norfolk robin =

Species of songbird native to Norfolk Island

The Norfolk robin (Petroica multicolor), also known as the Norfolk Island scarlet robin or Norfolk Island robin, is a small bird in the Australasian robin family Petroicidae. It is endemic to Norfolk Island, an Australian territory in the Tasman Sea, between Australia and New Zealand.

== Taxonomy ==
The Norfolk robin was formally described in 1789 by the German naturalist Johann Friedrich Gmelin in his revised and expanded edition of Carl Linnaeus's Systema Naturae. He placed it with the flycatchers in the genus Muscicapa and coined the binomial name Muscicapa multicolor. Gmelin based his description on the "red-bellied flycatcher" from Norfolk Island that had been described and illustrated in 1783 by the English ornithologist John Latham in his book A General Synopsis of Birds. Latham had examined a specimen of a male bird owned by the naturalist Joseph Banks and a female bird in the Leverian Museum in London. The Norfolk robin is now placed with 13 other species in the genus Petroica that was introduced in 1829 by the English naturalist, William Swainson. The species is monotypic: no subspecies are recognised.

The robin was considered conspecific with the scarlet robin (Petroica boodang) of Australia, but it was separated in 1999, with the Norfolk Island form as part of the Pacific robin assemblage. It was determined to be a distinct species in 2015.

== Description ==
The Norfolk robin is similar to the Pacific robin, as well as to the scarlet robin. The adult male is distinctive, having upperparts that are mainly black with a large white spot on the forehead, white bars on the wings, and vestigial white tips to the tail. Its breast and upper belly are bright red with the lower belly white. The female is much duller, mainly brown with a pinkish breast. Immature individuals are similar to females. It is the largest of the Pacific robin group, though slightly smaller than the scarlet robin.

== Distribution and habitat ==
The robin is restricted to Norfolk Island, where it is largely confined to the Mt Pitt section of the Norfolk Island National Park and remnant patches of forest nearby. It mainly inhabits the native subtropical rainforest, with lower densities in other wooded habitats. It prefers areas with a dense understorey and an open ground layer with deep, moist litter for foraging in.

== Behaviour ==
The robin feeds on a wide variety of invertebrates.

== Status and conservation ==
After a period of decline to the 1980s, when the birds disappeared from many parts of the island, the population of the Norfolk robin apparently stabilised and was estimated at 400-500 pairs in 1988 with little change in 1997. Ongoing threats include habitat degradation, and predation by black rats and feral cats. It is considered Endangered on the IUCN Red List because of the restricted size of the population and the small area of its distribution. Ongoing conservation management actions include control of rats and feral cats to minimise predation, as well as control of invasive weeds to minimise habitat degradation. It is proposed to reintroduce the Norfolk robin to nearby Phillip Island, when the regenerating habitat there is suitable.

== Sources ==
- Commonwealth of Australia. (2005). National Recovery Plan for the Norfolk Island Scarlet Robin, Petroica multicolor multicolor, and the Norfolk Island Golden Whistler Pachycephala pectoralis xanthoprocta. Department of the Environment and Heritage, Canberra. ISBN 0642551669
- Garnett, Stephen T.; & Crowley, Gabriel M. (2000). The Action Plan for Australian Birds 2000. Environment Australia: Canberra. ISBN 0-642-54683-5
- Higgins, P.J.; Peter, J.M., eds. (2002). Handbook of Australian, New Zealand & Antarctic Birds. Vol. 6, Pardalotes to Strike-thrushes. Melbourne, Victoria: Oxford University Press. ISBN 978-0-19-553762-8.
- Schodde, R.; & Mason, I.J. (1999). The Directory of Australian Birds: Passerines. CSIRO Publishing: Melbourne. ISBN 0-643-06456-7
