= Greenly Island Conservation Park =

Protected area in South Australia

- IUCN category Ia (strict nature reserve)
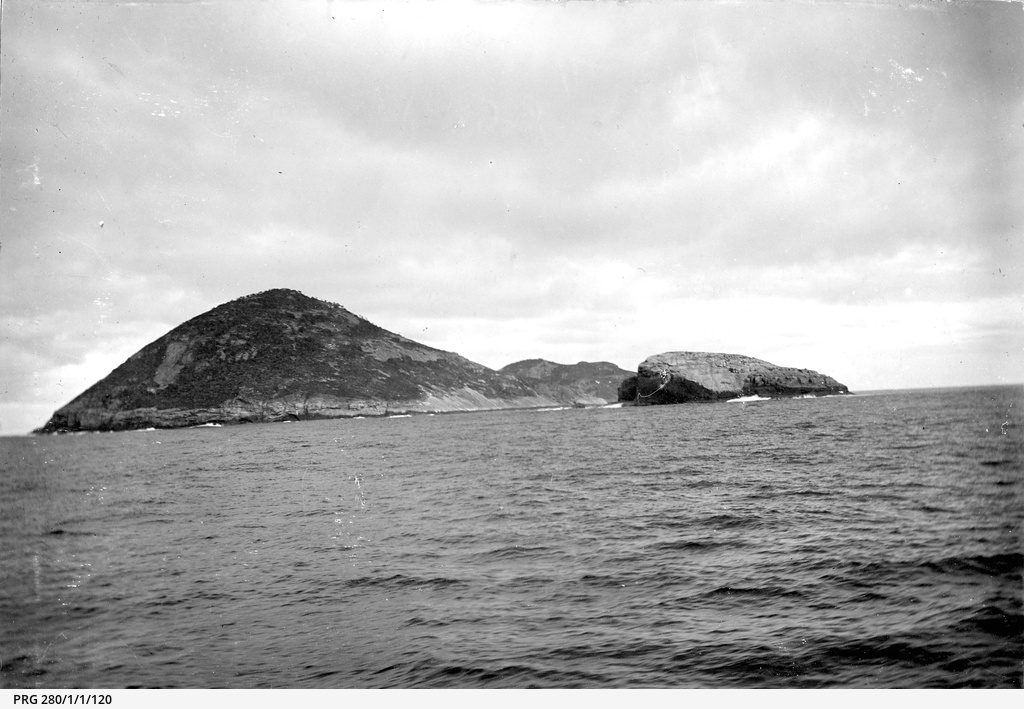
- Greenly Island; a distant view taken from the sea (circa 1903) [State Library of South Australia PRG 280/1/1/120]

- Location within South Australia
- Location: South Australia
- Nearest city: Coffin Bay.
- Coordinates: 34°38′39″S 134°47′33″E
- Area: 168 ha (420 acres)
- Established: 16 March 1967

Greenly Island Conservation Park is a protected area associated with Greenly Island located off the west coast of Eyre Peninsula in South Australia about 70 kilometres (43 miles) west of Coffin Bay. It was declared in 1972 under the National Parks and Wildlife Act 1972 ‘to protect the island’s delicate ecology and Australian Sea-lion and New Zealand Fur-seal haul-out areas’ and continuing protected area status for the island which was first declared in 1919. The conservation park is classified as an IUCN Category Ia protected area.
