= Mount Greenly (South Australia) =

Mountain in Australia

- Millapa
- Location within South Australia

Highest point
- Elevation: 305 m (1,001 ft)
- Coordinates: 34°20′42″S 135°22′12″E

Geography
- Location: Coulta, South Australia, Australia

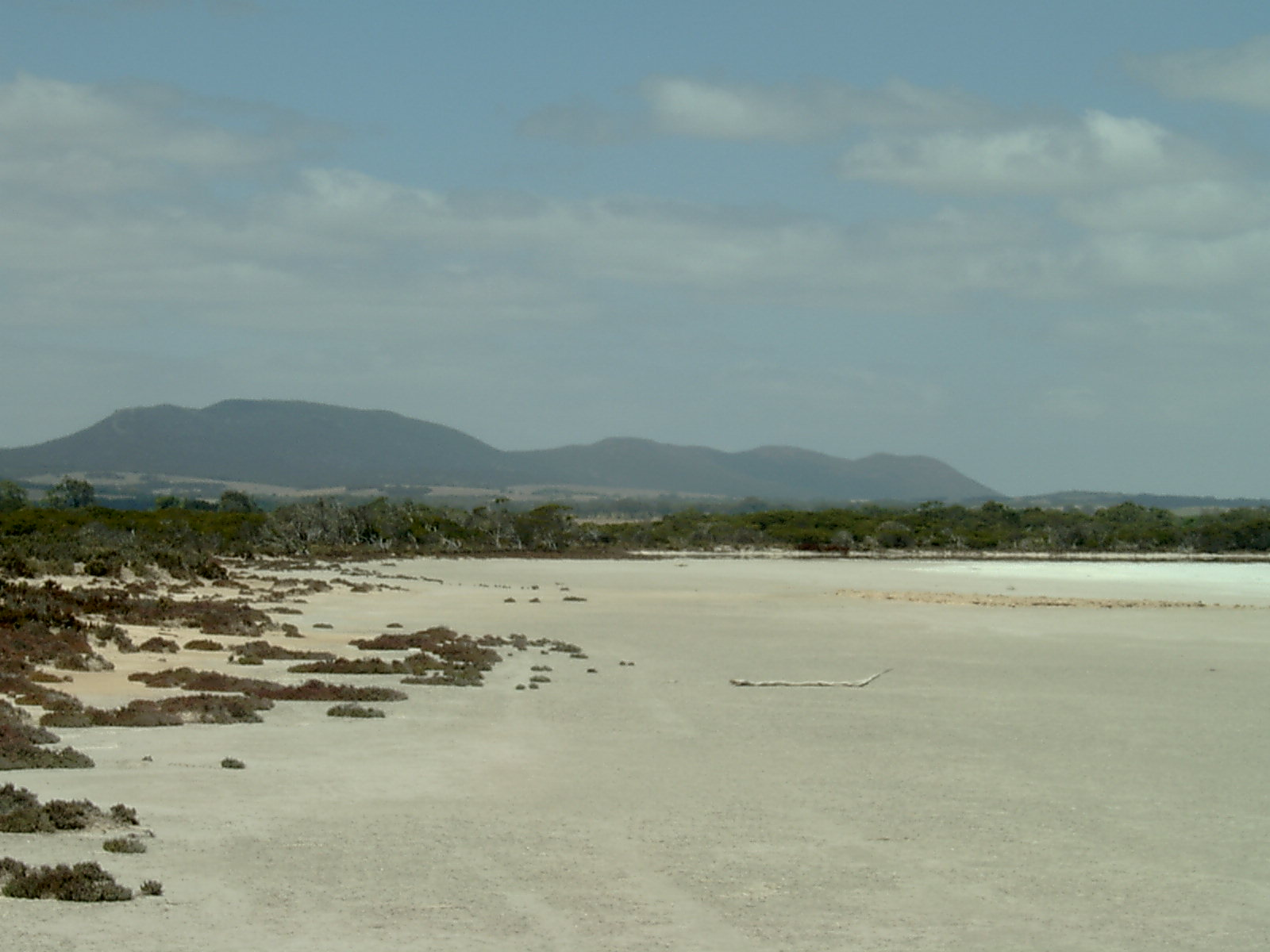
nearby Lake Greenly.

Mount Greenly (Nauo: Milaba) is a mountain in Australia located in the state of South Australia on the Eyre Peninsula in the gazetted locality of Coulta. The top of Mount Greenly is 305 metres (1,001 ft) above sea level.

Mount Greenly is a privately owned heritage listed land.

== Geography ==
The terrain around Mount Greenly is flat. The Southern Ocean is near Mount Greenly to the west. The area around Mount Greenly is almost unpopulated, with less than two inhabitants per square kilometer (5.2/sq mi).

The area around Mount Greenly is well vegetated with mallee trees. The climate in the area is temperate. The annual average temperature in the funnel is 16 °C (61 °F). The warmest month is January, when the average temperature is 25 °C (77 °F), and the coldest is June, at 8 °C (46 °F). The average annual average is 566 millimeters (22.3 in). The rainy month is June, with an average of 139 mm (5.5 in) rainfall, and the driest is January, with 15 mm (0.59 in) rainfall.
