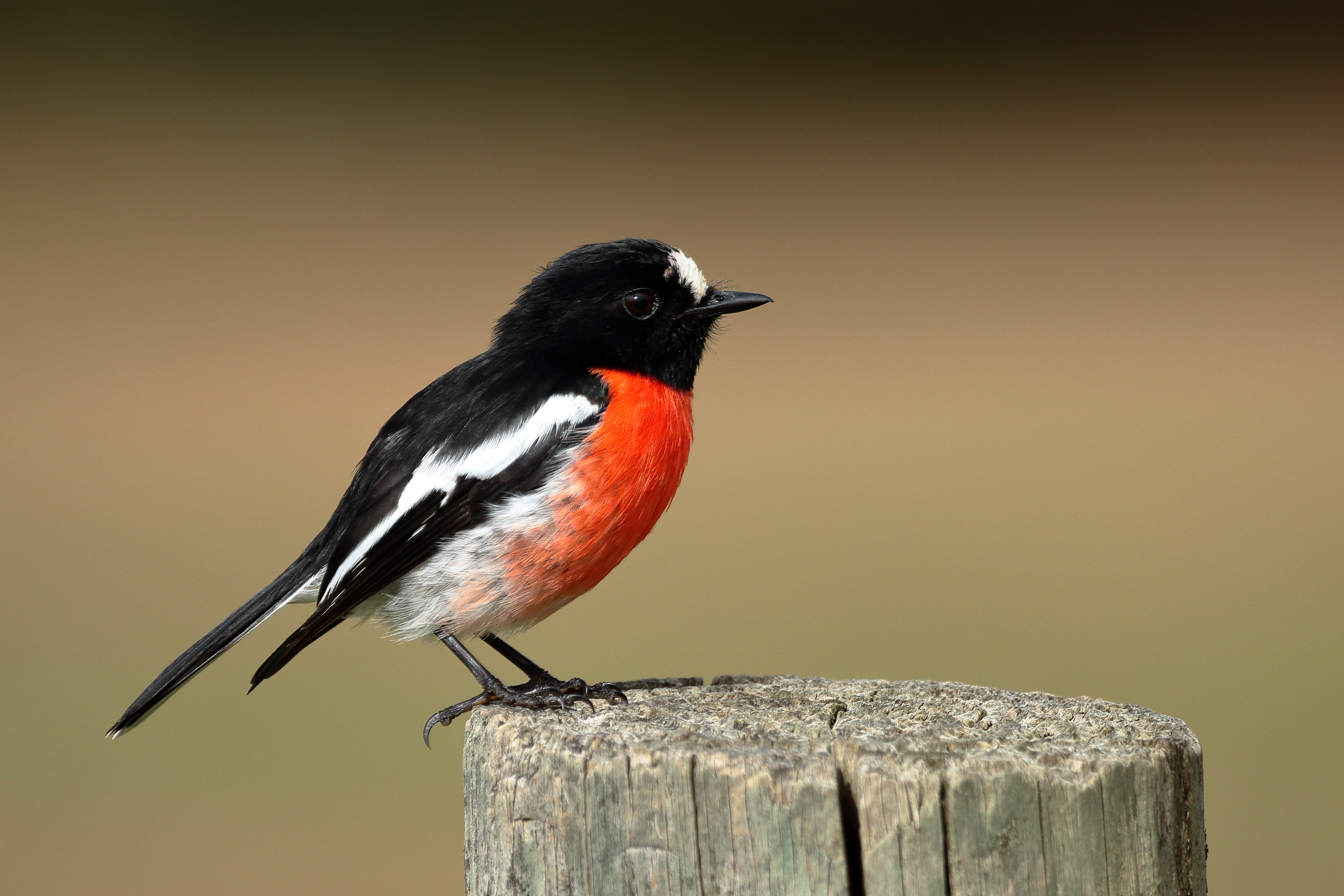
- Male
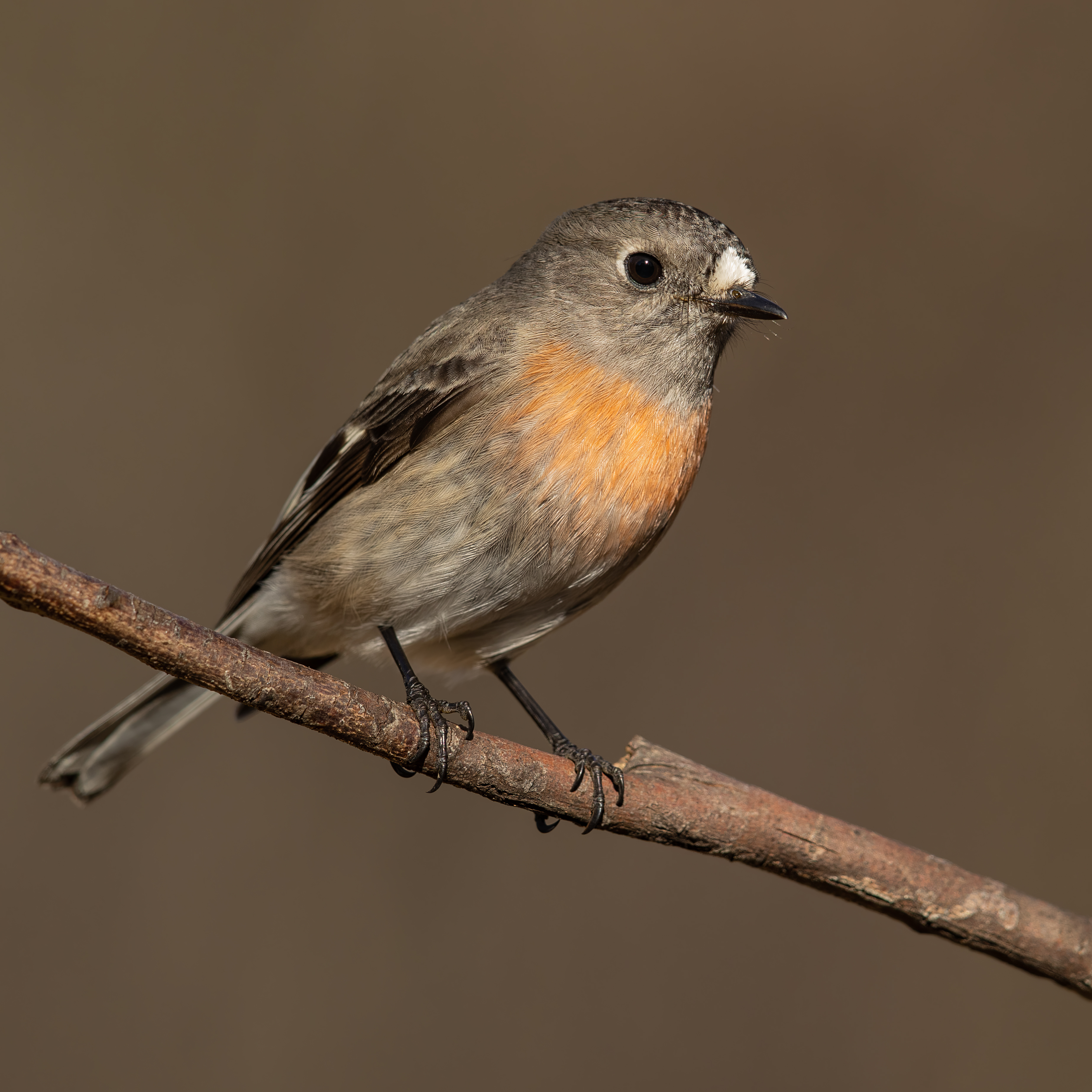
- Female

Conservation status
- Least Concern (IUCN 3.1)

Scientific classification
- Kingdom: Animalia
- Phylum: Chordata
- Class: Aves
- Order: Passeriformes
- Family: Petroicidae
- Genus: Petroica
- Species: P. boodang

Binomial name
- Petroica boodang (Lesson, RP, 1837)
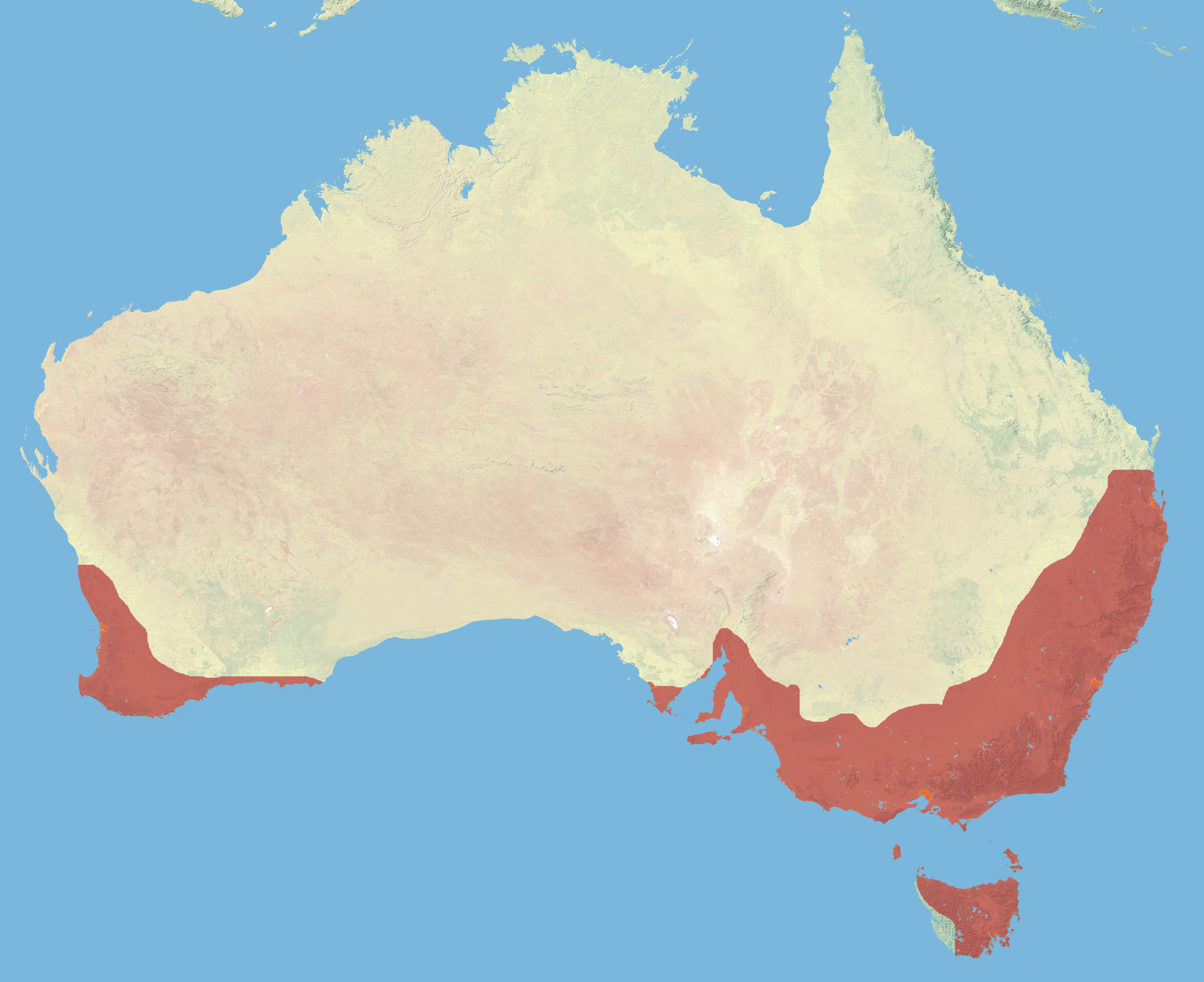
- Distribution map

Synonyms
- Petroica multicolor boodang

= Scarlet robin =

Songbird species native to southern Australia

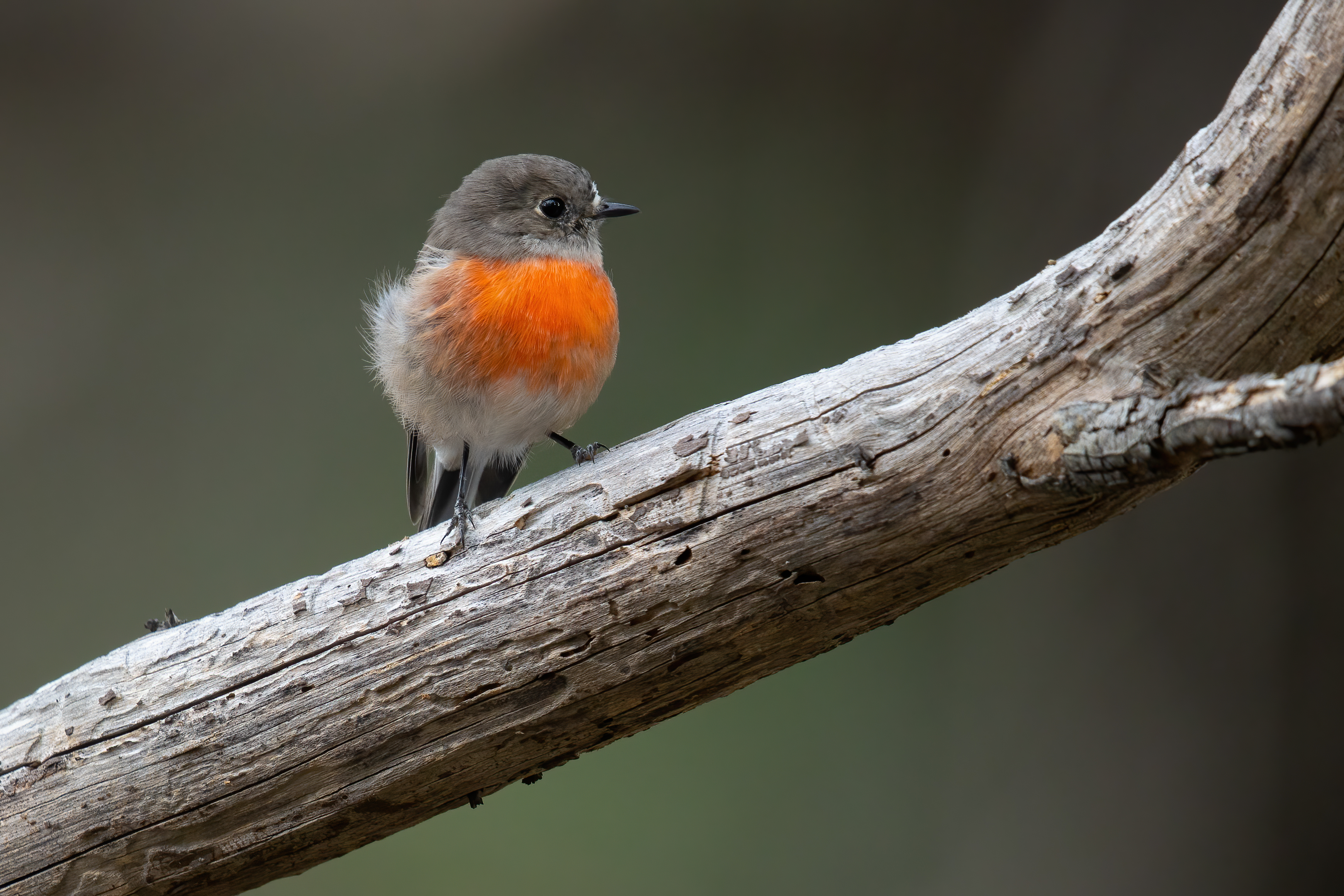
Male

The scarlet robin (Petroica boodang) is a common red-breasted Australasian robin in the passerine bird genus Petroica. The species is found on continental Australia and its offshore islands, including Tasmania. The species was originally split in 1999 by Schodde and Mason, and as the original collection by Gmelin was from Norfolk Island, this retained the name of multicolor, and is now known as the Norfolk robin.

== Taxonomy ==
There are three recognised subspecies of Petroica boodang: the nominate subspecies P.b.boodang is found in mainland southeastern Australia; P.b.leggii is found in Tasmania and Flinders Island in the Bass Strait; and P.b.campbelli occurs in southwestern Western Australia.

== Description ==
Like the rest of the Australasian robins, the scarlet robins are stocky passerines with large heads. They range in size from 12 to 13.5 cm in length and weigh between 12 and 14 g. The plumage is sexually dimorphic. The males have black heads, backs and tails, black and white wings, a scarlet red breast, and white belly, forehead and rump. The female matches the male in pattern, but is duller, with brown plumage instead of black, a much more washed-out red on the breast, and a buff belly. Juvenile birds resemble the female without the reddish wash on the breast.

== Distribution, movements and habitat ==
The scarlet robin is endemic to Australia, where it is found near the coast from southern Queensland to central South Australia, Tasmania and southwest Western Australia. The species is mostly sedentary over its range, but some mainland populations undergo small local movements in the autumn and winter, either to more open habitats or to lower elevations.

The scarlet robin is most commonly found in eucalyptus woodland and forest, from sea level to 1000 m, particularly the more open habitats with grassy and shrubby understories. During the winter, more open environments, including urban habitats, are frequented.

== Behaviour ==
The scarlet robin feeds on arthropods, such as insects and spiders. It adjusts its foraging behaviour seasonally, feeding mostly on the ground during the winter, but during the summer and spring prey is more commonly snatched from bark and foliage.

=== Breeding biology ===
The scarlet robin is a territorial and monogamous species, and defends its nesting territories both from others of the same species and from pairs of the related flame robin. Territories are established and breeding commences before the migratory flame robin arrives in its range (where the two co-occur). Both the male and the female participate in selecting the nesting site, but only the female constructs the nest, a task which takes four to ten days. The clutch size is between one and four eggs, with three being the average. The eggs are grey, green or pale blue, and marked with brown to olive-brown splotches and spots, usually concentrated around the large end. Only the females incubate the eggs, and the males feed the females on the nest. The chicks hatch after 14 to 18 days. At first, they are brooded by the female and fed by the male; when brooding ends, they are fed by both parents. Nesting success is generally low, between 8 and 40%. Scarlet robin nests are raided by snakes, and they are victims of brood parasitism by various species of cuckoo.

== Gallery ==
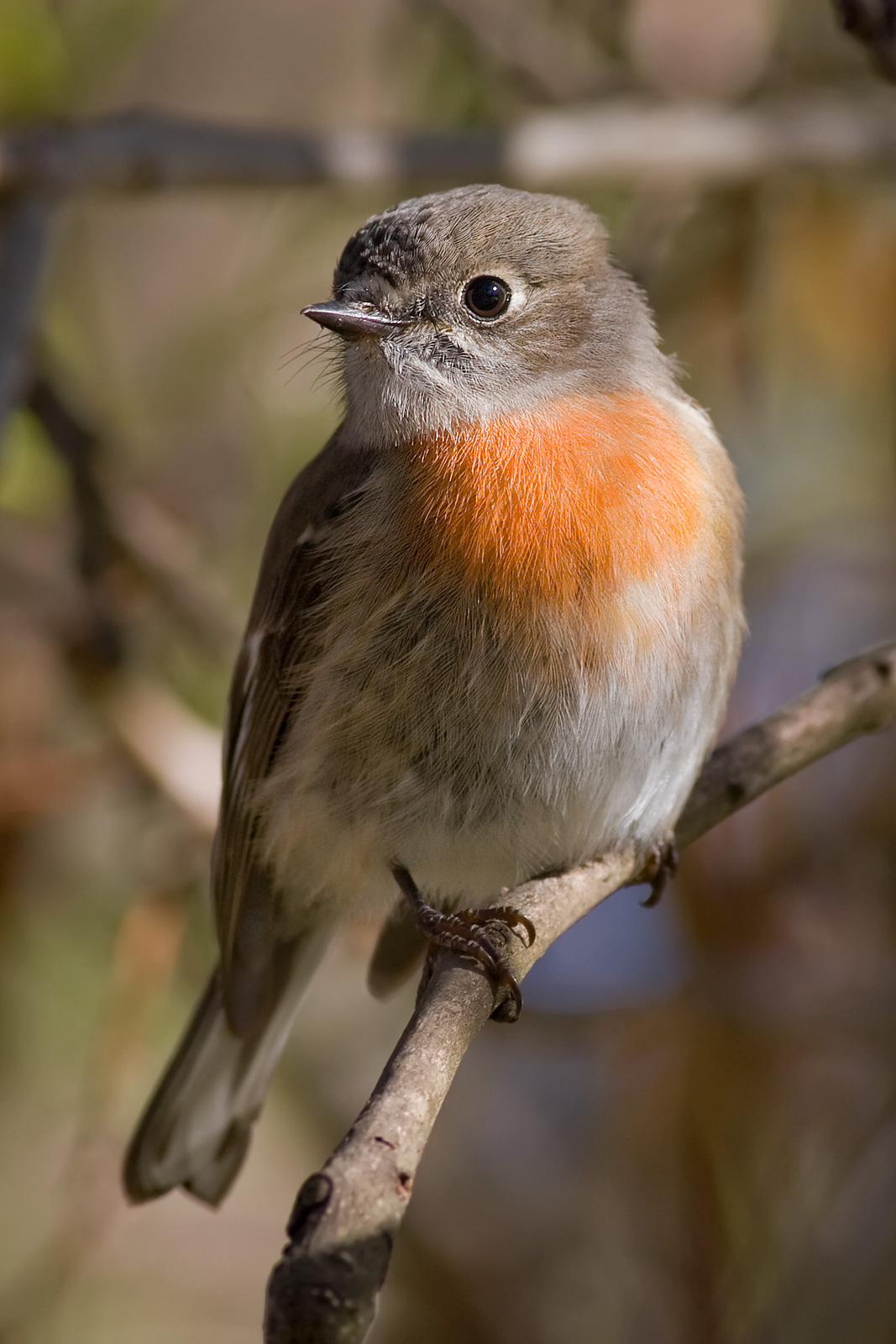
Female
Victoria, Australia

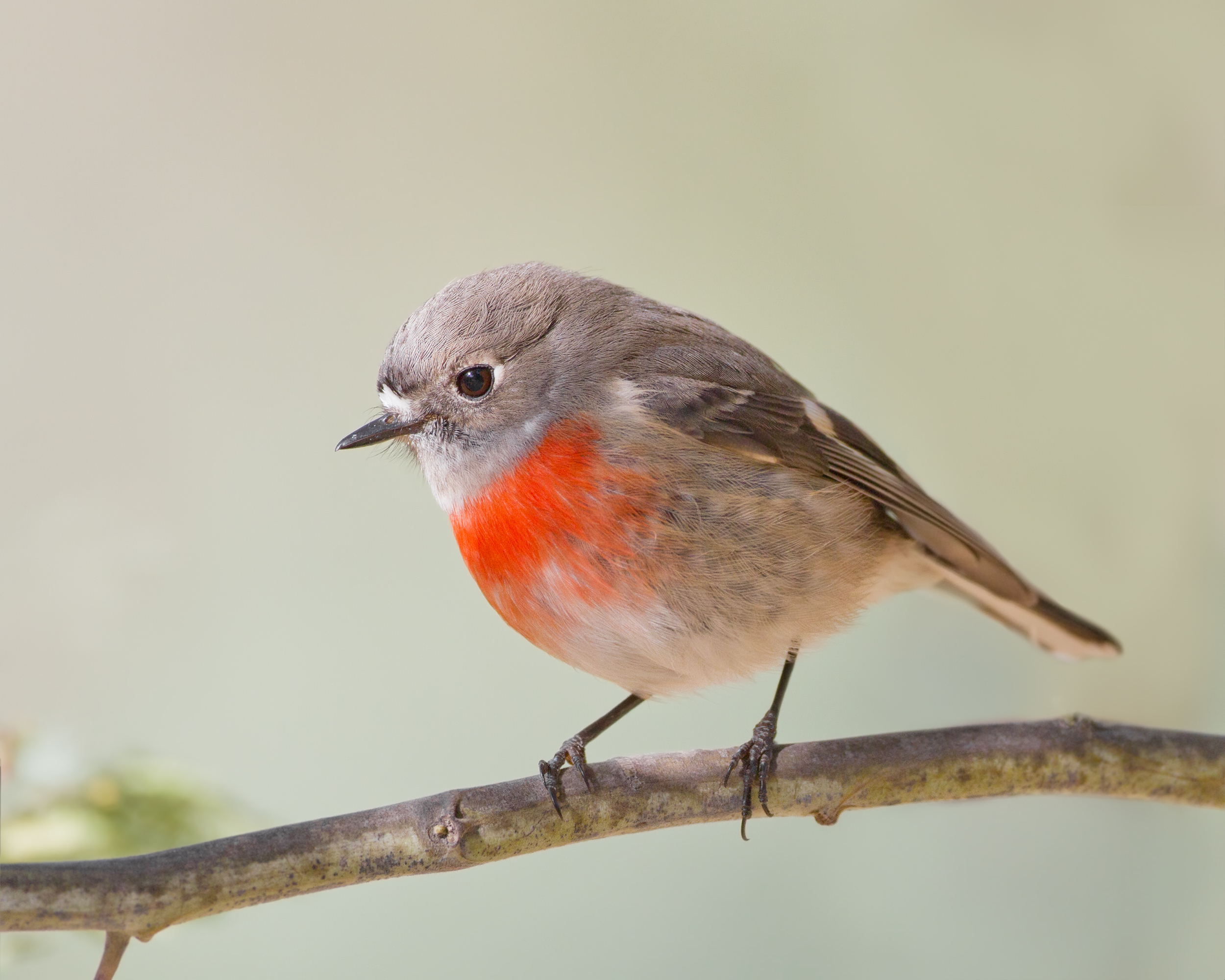
Female
Hobart, Tasmania

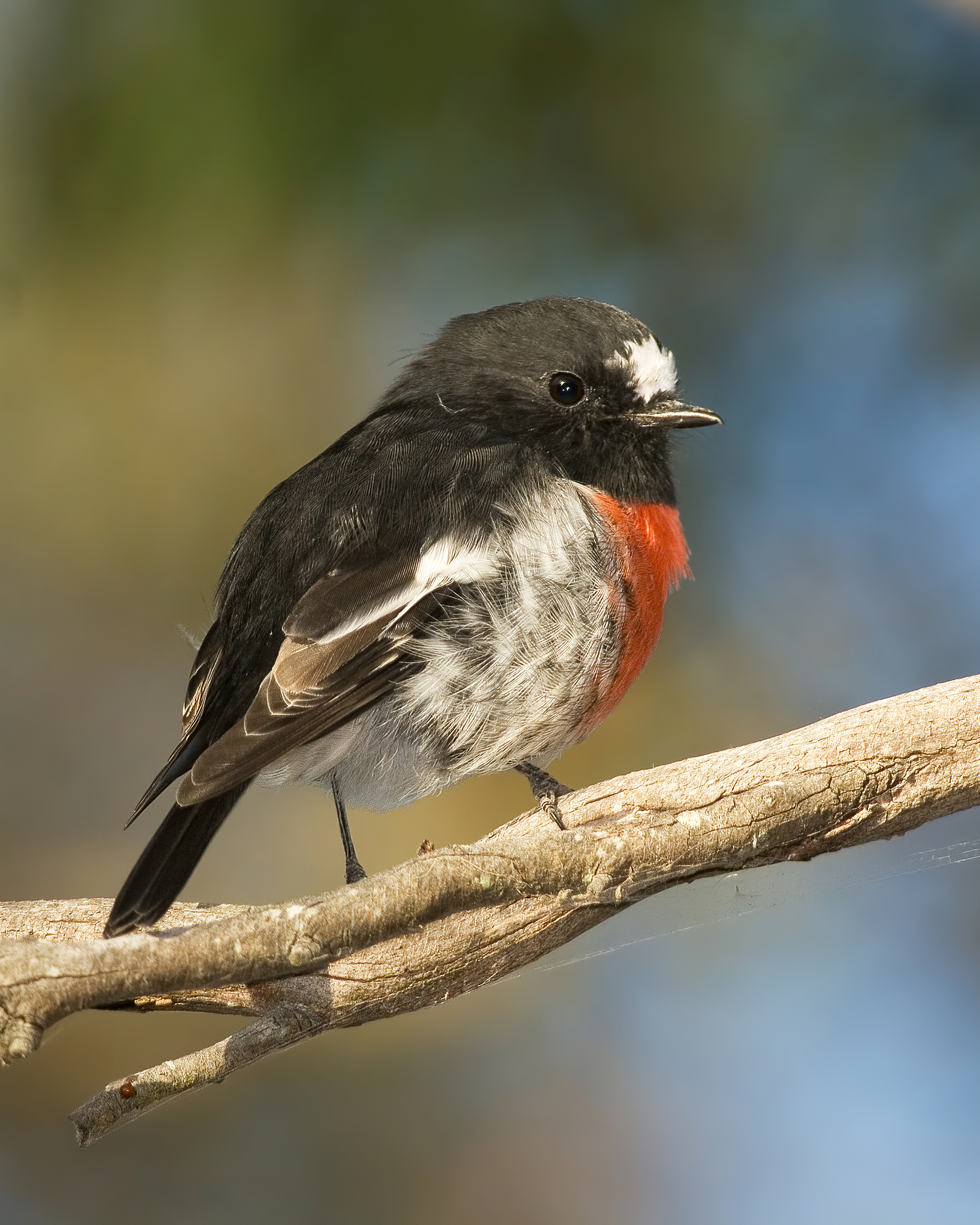
Male
Meehan Range, Tasmania

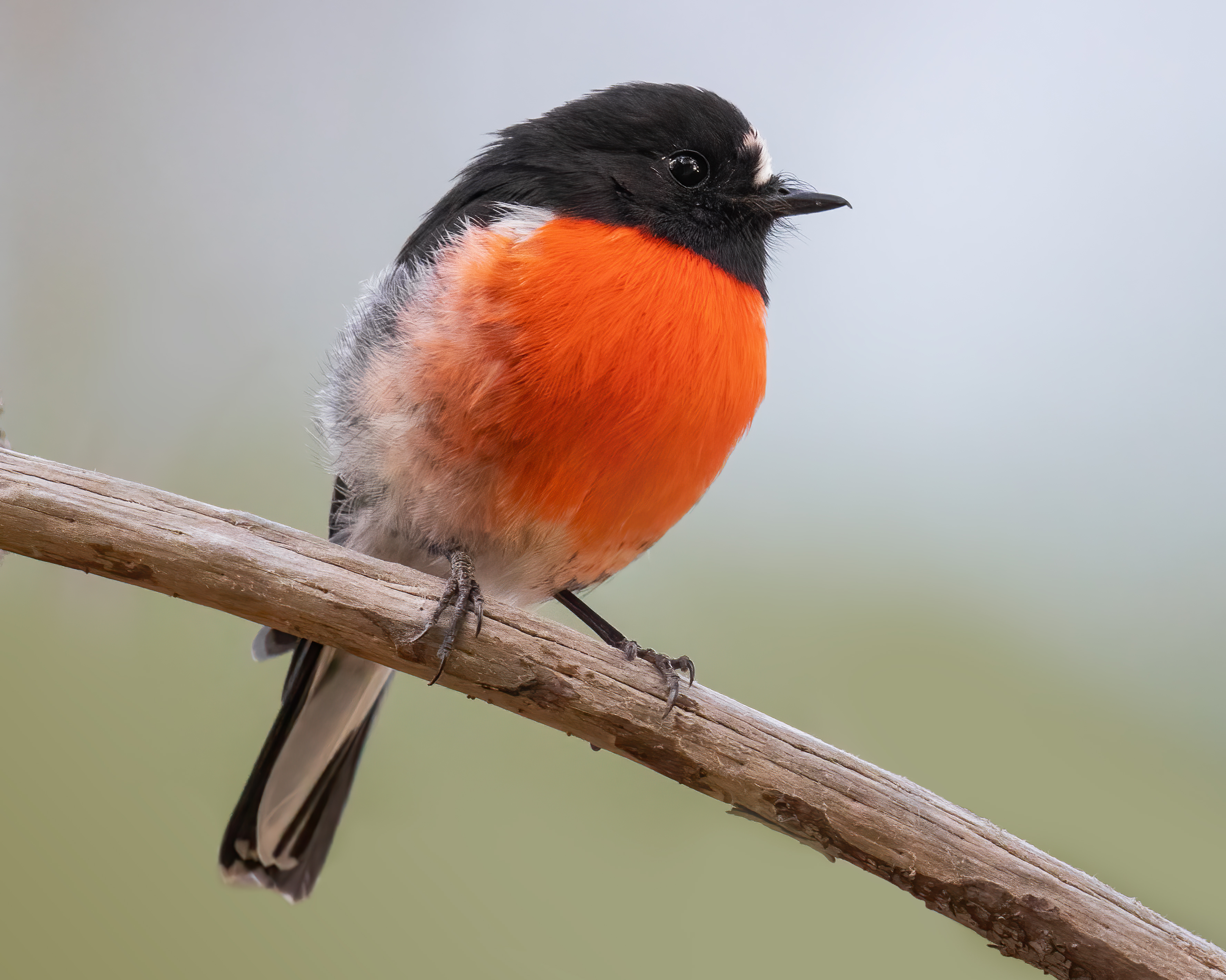
Male
Mortimer Bay, Tasmania

== See also ==
- List of Australasian birds
- List of Western Australian birds
