= Greenly Island (South Australia) =

Island in South Australia

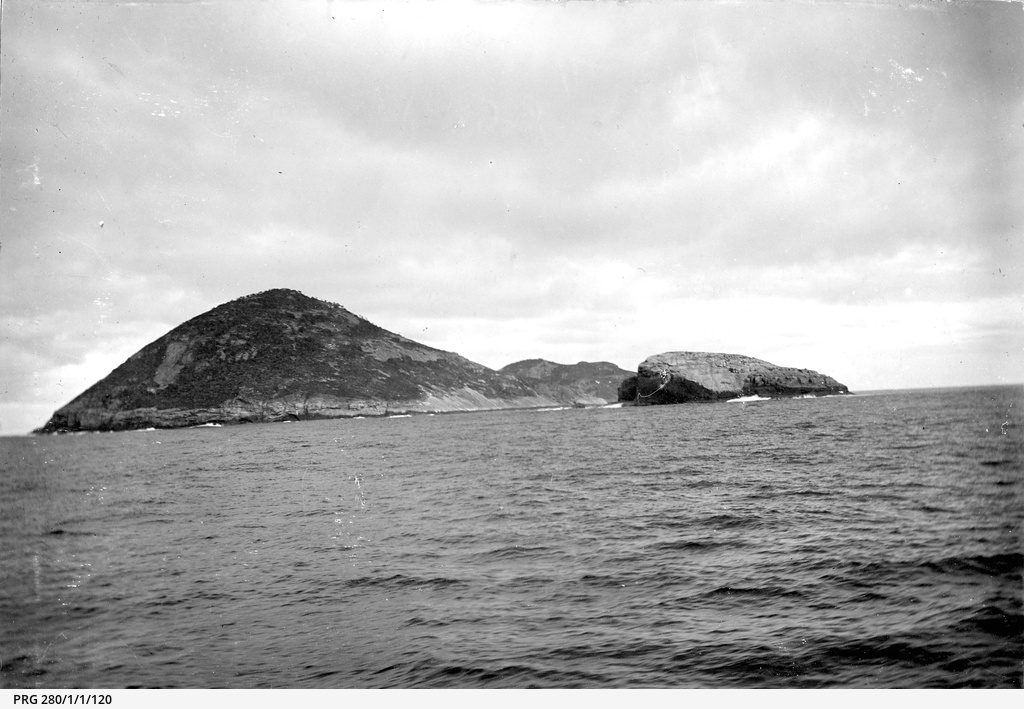
- Greenly Island; a distant view taken from the sea (circa 1903) [State Library of South Australia PRG 280/1/1/120]

- Location within South Australia

Geography
- Location: Great Australian Bight
- Coordinates: 34.647°S 134.798°E
- Highest elevation: 230 m (750 ft)

Administration
- Australia

Greenly Island is an island in the Australian state of South Australia located in the Great Australian Bight about 30 kilometres (19 mi) west-south-west of Point Whidbey on Eyre Peninsula. The island is uninhabited by humans and provides a haven for marine and terrestrial wildlife. The island and its intertidal zone constitute the Greenly Island Conservation Park. Its adjacent waters are occasionally visited by fishermen targeting yellowtail kingfish.

== Nomenclature ==
Greenly Island was named for Sir Isaac Coffin’s fiancée, Elizabeth Browne Greenly of Titley Court, by the British explorer Matthew Flinders on 16 February 1802.

== Environment ==
Greenly Island is a large granite dome with steep sides plunging vertically into deep water, split by two large crevasses which effectively break the island into three blocks. The top of the island is capped with drooping sheoak (Allocasuarina verticillata) and dryland tea-tree (Melaleuca lanceolata) woodlands while the lower slopes have either a coastal tussock (Poa poiformis var. poiformis) grassland or a marsh saltbush (Atriplex paludosa var. cordata) shrubland. The main part of the island rises to the east to a steep peak of 230m.

== Fauna ==
The island features haul-out areas for Australian sea lion and New Zealand fur seal. The Australian sea lion, previously known as a "hair seal" was observed by visitors to Greenly Island in 1948. Western blue groper and yellowtail kingfish are found in the waters off Greenly Island. The tammar wallaby was introduced to Greenly Island (south) in 1905 to provide food for stranded sailors. Their impact on the vegetation is obvious in the marked difference between the north and south islands. Both northern and southern islands support high-density populations of bush rats.

Birds recorded on Greenly Island include the Cape Barren goose, white-faced heron, ruddy turnstone, Australian raven, nankeen kestrel, white-bellied sea eagle, sooty oystercatcher, welcome swallow, silver gull, Pacific gull, rock parrot, little grassbird, red-capped robin, great cormorant, short-tailed shearwater, crested tern, fairy tern, silvereye and little penguin.

Reptiles recorded on Greenly Island include the bull skink (Egernia multiscutata) and four-toed earless skink (Hemiergis peronii), southern four-toed slider (Lerista dorsalis), dwarf skink (Menetia greyii), Mallee snakeeye (Morethia obscura) and marbled gecko (Phyllodactylus marmoratus).

=== Little penguins ===
The first fauna study of Greenly Island was conducted in 1948 and described the little penguins as "innumerable". The island was noted as a breeding site in a 1996 survey of South Australia's offshore islands. In 2004, the little penguin colony's population was estimated at 1,500 breeding birds.

== Protected area status ==
Greenly Island first obtained protected area status as a fauna conservation reserve declared under the Crown Lands Act 1929-1966 on 16 March 1967 . The fauna conservation reserve was reconstituted as the Greenly Island Conservation Park under the National Parks and Wildlife Act 1972 in 1972.

== See also ==
- List of little penguin colonies
