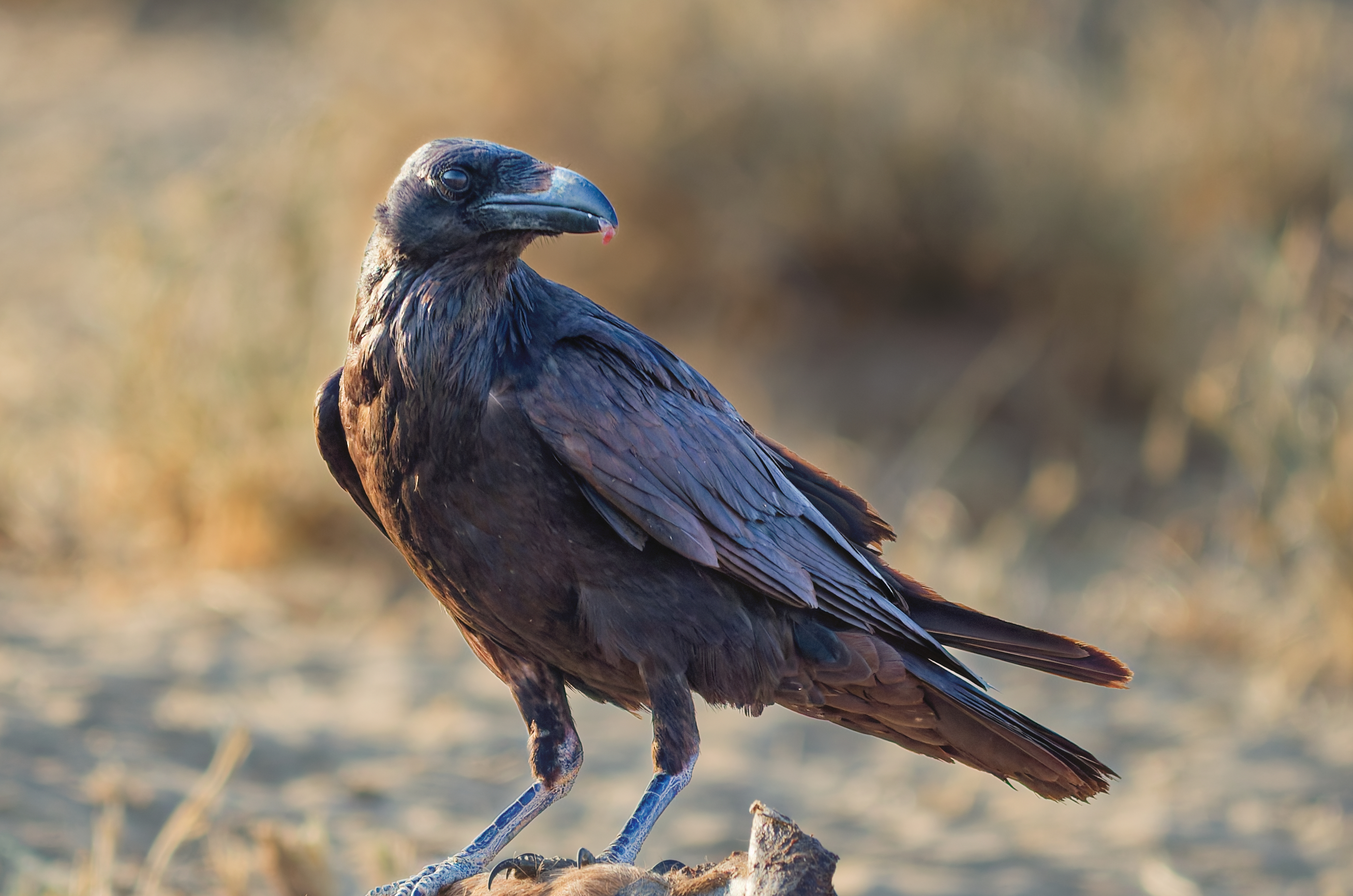

Scientific classification
- Kingdom: Animalia
- Phylum: Chordata
- Class: Aves
- Order: Passeriformes
- Suborder: Passeri
- Parvorder: Corvida

Families
- See text

= Corvida =

Group of birds

The "Corvida" were one of two "parvorders" contained within the suborder Passeri, as proposed in the Sibley-Ahlquist taxonomy, the other being Passerida. Standard taxonomic practice would place them at the rank of infraorder.

More recent research suggests that this is not a distinct clade—a group of closest relatives and nothing else—but an evolutionary grade instead. As such, it is abandoned in modern treatments, being replaced by a number of superfamilies that are considered rather basal among the Passeri.

It was presumed that cooperative breeding—present in many or most members of the Maluridae, Meliphagidae, Artamidae and Corvidae, among others—is a common apomorphy of this group. But as evidenced by the updated phylogeny, this trait is rather the result of parallel evolution, perhaps because the early Passeri had to compete against many ecologically similar birds.

== Placement of "Corvida" families ==
This table lists, in taxonomic order, the families placed in "Corvida" by the Sibley-Ahlquist taxonomy in the left column. The right column contains details of their placement in modern systematics.

Corvoidea and Meliphagoidea are placed basally among the Passeri too. They are, however, groups large enough to be considered superfamilies in their own right.

Family	Modern placement
Menuridae: lyrebirds	Basalmost Passeri, close to Atrichornithidae
Atrichornithidae: scrub-birds	Basalmost Passeri, close to Menuridae
Climacteridae: Australian treecreepers	Basal Passeri, close to Ptilonorhynchidae
Ptilonorhynchidae: bowerbirds	Basal Passeri, close to Climacteridae
Maluridae: fairy-wrens, emu-wrens and grasswrens	Meliphagoidea. Nowadays several families.
Meliphagidae: honeyeaters and allies	Meliphagoidea
Pardalotidae: pardalotes, scrubwrens, thornbills, and gerygones	Meliphagoidea. Nowadays several families; Pardalotidae proper might belong in Meliphagidae
Petroicidae: Australasian robins	Passeri incertae sedis, close to Picathartidae
Orthonychidae: logrunners	Passeri incertae sedis, close to Pomatostomidae
Pomatostomidae: Australasian babblers	Passeri incertae sedis, close to Orthonychidae
Cinclosomatidae: whipbirds and allies	Corvoidea incertae sedis, relationships with Pachycephalidae unresolved
Neosittidae: sittellas	Corvoidea
Pachycephalidae: whistlers, shrike-thrushes, pitohuis and allies	Corvoidea incertae sedis, highly paraphyletic and relationships with Cinclosomatidae unresolved
Dicruridae: monarch flycatchers and allies	Corvoidea. Possibly paraphyletic
Oriolidae: orioles and figbirds	Corvoidea
Icteridae: American blackbirds/orioles, grackles and cowbirds	Passerida: Passeroidea (the most "modern" main lineage of songbirds)
Artamidae: woodswallows, butcherbirds, currawongs and Australian magpie	Corvoidea
Paradisaeidae: birds of paradise	Corvoidea
Cnemophilidae: satinbirds (included in Paradisaeidae)	Passeri incertae sedis, possibly close to Callaeidae
Corvidae: crows, ravens, jays, etc.	Corvoidea
Corcoracidae: white-winged chough and apostlebird	Corvoidea
Irenidae: fairy-bluebirds	Passeri incertae sedis; close to Passeroidea or Regulidae (kinglets)
Laniidae: shrikes	Corvoidea
Prionopidae: helmetshrikes (initially included in Laniidae)	Corvoidea
Malaconotidae: bush-shrikes and allies (initially included in Laniidae)	Corvoidea
Vireonidae: vireos	Corvoidea
Vangidae: vangas	Corvoidea
Turnagridae: piopios	Corvoidea (included in Oriolidae)
Callaeidae: New Zealand wattlebirds	Passeri incertae sedis, possibly close to Cnemophilidae

In addition, the following families were not included in the "Corvida" although their closest relationships are with taxa included therein:

Family	Sibley-Ahlquist placement	Modern placement
Platysteiridae: wattle-eyes	Passerida (included in Muscicapidae)	Corvoidea
Picathartidae: rockfowl	Passerida	Passeri incertae sedis, close to Petroicidae
Chaetopidae: rockjumpers	Passerida (Turdidae)	Passeri incertae sedis, close to Petroicidae
Melanocharitidae: berrypeckers and longbills	Passerida	Passeri incertae sedis, possibly close to Cnemophilidae
Paramythiidae: tit berrypecker and crested berrypecker	Passerida (included in Melanocharitidae)	Passeri incertae sedis, possibly close to Cnemophilidae
