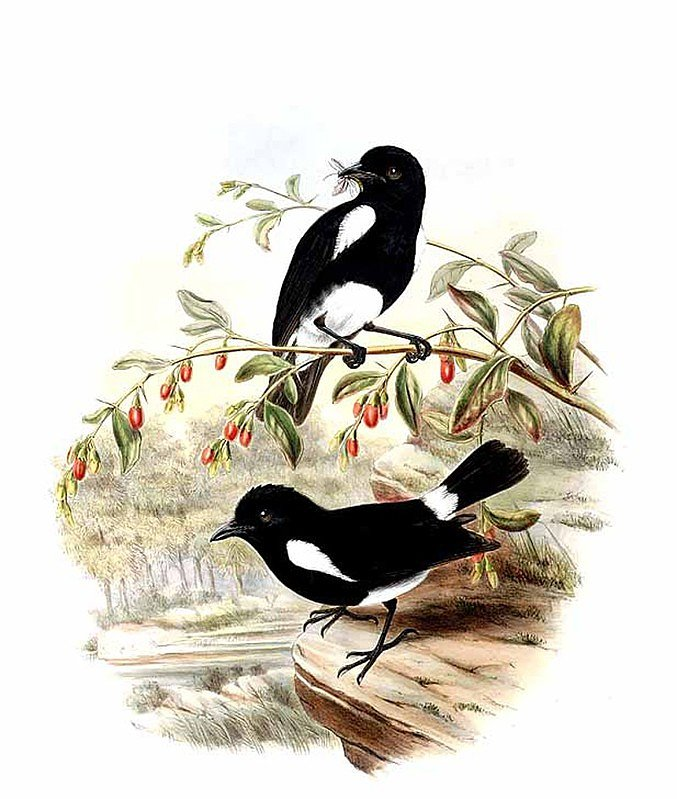

Conservation status
- Least Concern (IUCN 3.1)

Scientific classification
- Kingdom: Animalia
- Phylum: Chordata
- Class: Aves
- Order: Passeriformes
- Family: Petroicidae
- Genus: Melanodryas
- Species: M. bimaculata

Binomial name
- Melanodryas bimaculata (Salvadori, 1874)

Synonyms
- Peneothello bimaculata

= White-rumped robin =

Species of songbird native to New Guinea

The white-rumped robin (Melanodryas bimaculata) is a species of bird in the Australasian robin family Petroicidae. It is found in New Guinea. Its natural habitats are subtropical or tropical moist lowland forests and subtropical or tropical moist montane forests.

== Taxonomy ==
The white-rumped robin was formally described in 1874 by the Italian zoologist Tommaso Salvadori based on a specimen that had been collected by Luigi D'Albertis at Putat in the Arfak Mountains or northwest New Guinea. Salvadori was unsure of the genus and gave the binomial name as Myiolestes ? bimaculatus. The specific epithet is Modern Latin meaning "two-spotted" or "double-spotted". The white-rumped robin was formerly placed in the genus Peneothella, but in 2025 Peneothello was merged into a more broadly defined Melanodryas. This change was based on the results of a 2011 molecular genetic study of the Australasian robins by Les Christidis and coworkers.

Two subspecies are recognised:

- M. b. bimaculata (Salvadori, AT, 1874) – mountains of northwestern New Guinea
- M. b. vicaria (De Vis, CW, 1892) – mountains of southeastern New Guinea and Huon Peninsula

== Description ==
Measuring 13 to 14 cm (5.1 to 5.5 in), the white-rumped robin has black plumage with a white rump and upper tail coverts. It has white patches on the sides of its breast. The abdomen is white in the nominate subspecies, and black with some white in the subspecies vicarius. The female closely resembles the male, but its black feathers have brown tinges. The bill and feet are black, and the eyes are dark brown.

== Distribution and habitat ==
The white-rumped robin is found in the highlands of New Guinea from altitudes of 300 to 1,700 m (980 to 5,580 ft). Within the rainforest it is found in pairs in the understory or on the ground. It is insectivorous.
