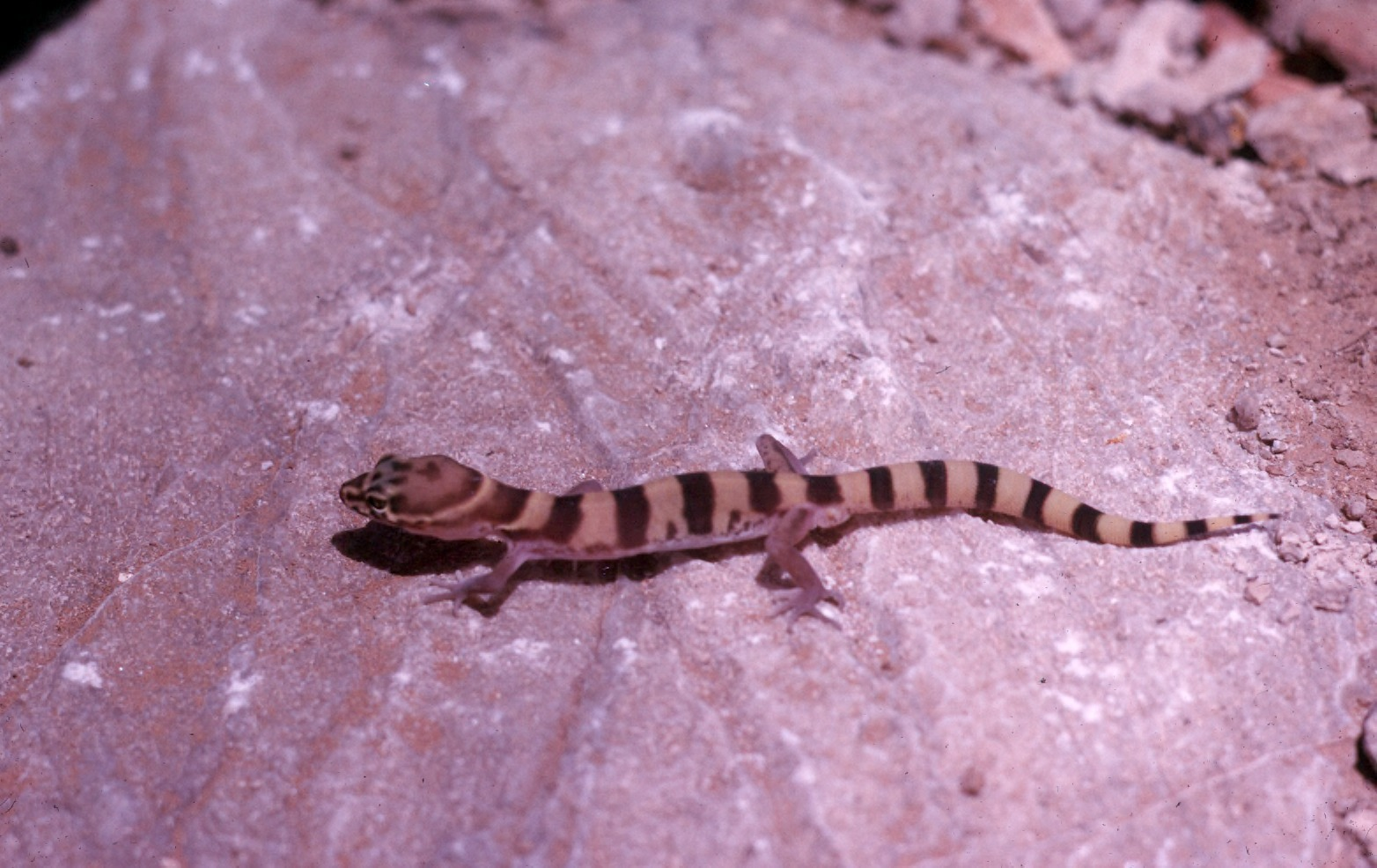

Conservation status
- Least Concern (IUCN 3.1)

Scientific classification
- Kingdom: Animalia
- Phylum: Chordata
- Order: Squamata
- Suborder: Gekkota
- Family: Gekkonidae
- Genus: Cyrtodactylus
- Species: C. louisiadensis

Binomial name
- Cyrtodactylus louisiadensis (De Vis, 1892)

Synonyms
- Gymnodactylus louisiadensis; Gonydactylus louisiadensis

= Ring-tailed gecko =

Species of lizard

The ring-tailed gecko (Cyrtodactylus louisiadensis) is a species of gecko that is endemic to the Louisiade Archipelago of Papua New Guinea.
