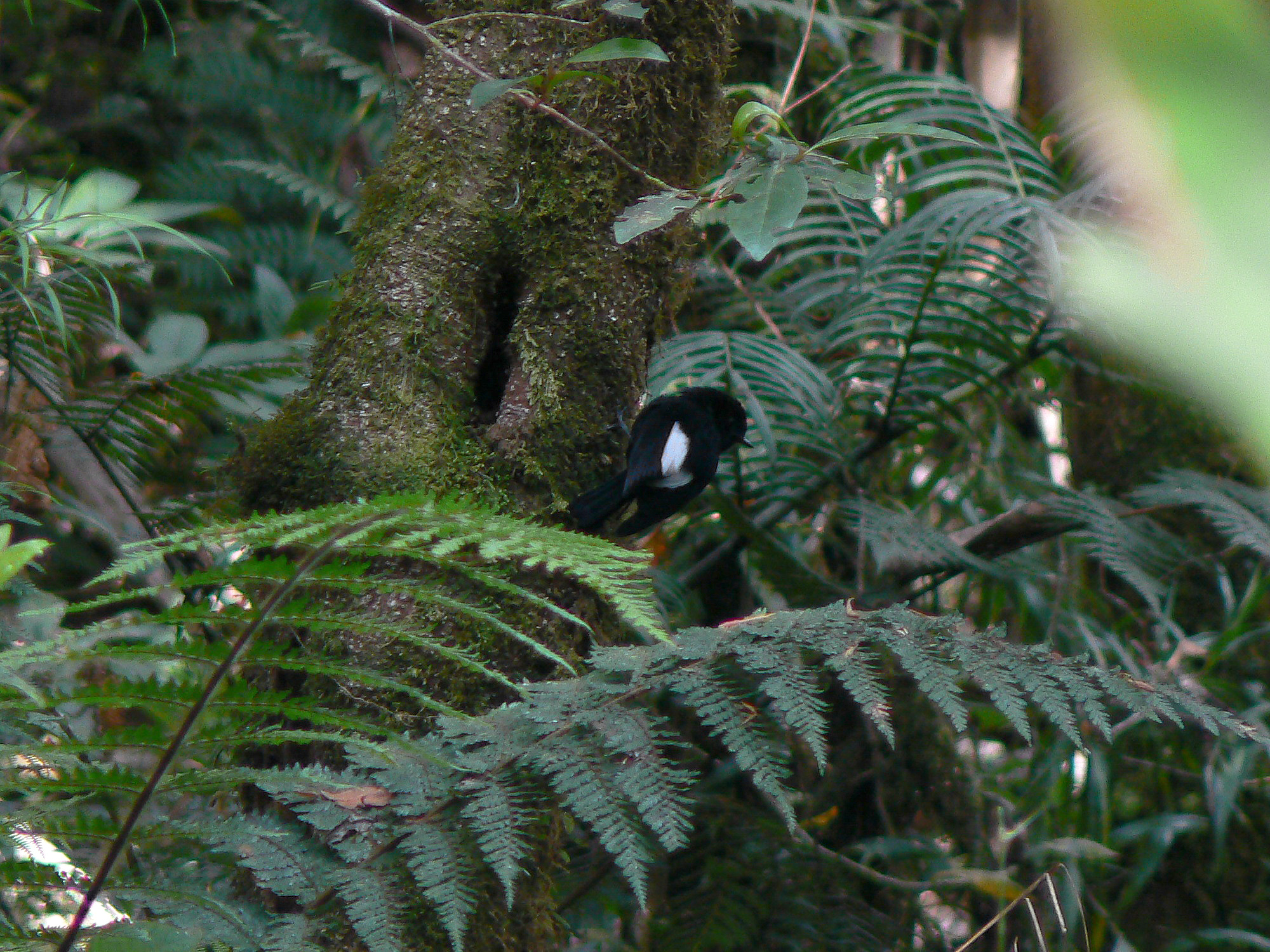

Conservation status
- Least Concern (IUCN 3.1)

Scientific classification
- Kingdom: Animalia
- Phylum: Chordata
- Class: Aves
- Order: Passeriformes
- Family: Petroicidae
- Genus: Melanodryas
- Species: M. sigillata

Binomial name
- Melanodryas sigillata (De Vis, 1890)

Synonyms
- Peneothello sigillatus; Peneothello sigillata

= White-winged robin =

Species of songbird native to New Guinea

The white-winged robin (Melanodryas sigillata) is a species of bird in the Australasian robin family Petroicidae.

== Taxonomy ==
The white-winged robin was formally described in 1890 as Poecilodryas sigillata by the English naturalist Charles Walter De Vis based on a specimen collected on Mount Victoria in southeast New Guinea. The specific epithet is from Latin meaning "adorned with little figures" from "sigilla" meaning "image", "little figure" or "mark". The white-winged robin was formerly placed in the genus Peneothello, but based on the results of a 2011 molecular genetic study of the Australasian robins by Les Christidis and coworkers, in 2025 the genus Peneothello was merged into a more broadly defined Melanodryas.

Three subspecies are recognised:

- M. s. saruwagedi (Mayr, E, 1931) – montane north-eastern New Guinea (mountains of Huon Peninsula)
- M. s. quadrimaculata (van Oort, ED, 1910) – montane western New Guinea (Nassau and Snow mountains)
- M. s. sigillata (De Vis, CW, 1890) – montane east-central to southeastern New Guinea

== Description ==
Measuring 14 to 15 centimetres (5.5 to 5.9 in), the adult white-winged robin has black plumage, with largely white wings. The male and female are identical. The bill and feet are black, and the eyes are dark brown. Juveniles have a variable streaked brown plumage.

== Distribution and habitat ==
The white-winged robin is found in the New Guinea Highlands. Its natural habitat is subtropical or tropical moist montane forests. It is found in the highlands of New Guinea at elevations of 2,400 to 3,900 metres (7,900 to 12,800 ft) and is replaced by the slaty robin at lower elevations.

== Behaviour ==
Within the forest the robin is found in pairs or small troops of several birds in the understory or on the ground. It is insectivorous, but does also eat some seeds. The somewhat bulky cup-shaped nest is constructed in a tree fork.
