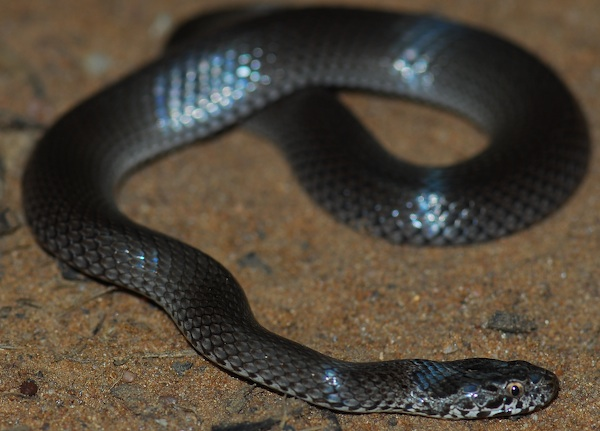
- Denisonia maculata, ornamental snake

Scientific classification
- Kingdom: Animalia
- Phylum: Chordata
- Class: Reptilia
- Order: Squamata
- Suborder: Serpentes
- Family: Elapidae
- Subfamily: Hydrophiinae
- Genus: Denisonia; Krefft, 1869

= Denisonia =

Genus of snakes

Denisonia is a genus of venomous snakes in the family Elapidae. The genus is endemic to Australia, and contains two recognized species.

== Species ==
The following two species are recognized as being valid.

- Denisonia devisi (Waite & Longman, 1920) – De Vis's banded snake, De Vis' banded snake, mud adder
- Denisonia maculata (Steindachner, 1867) – ornamental snake

== Etymology ==
The generic name, Denisonia, is in honor of William Thomas Denison, mid 19th century governor of parts of Australia. The specific name, devisi, is in honor of English herpetologist Charles Walter De Vis.
