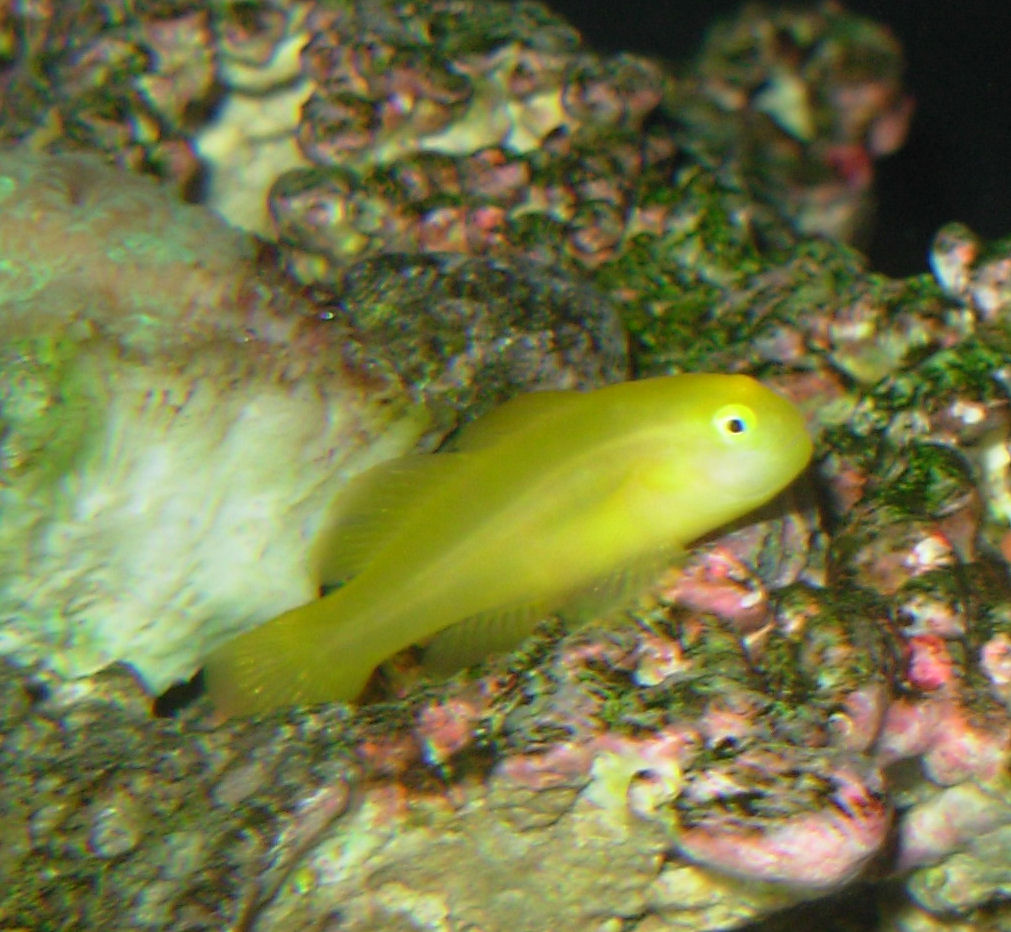
- Okinawa goby (G. okinawae)

Scientific classification
- Kingdom: Animalia
- Phylum: Chordata
- Class: Actinopterygii
- Order: Gobiiformes
- Family: Gobiidae
- Genus: Gobiodon; Bleeker, 1856

Type species
- Gobiodon heterospilos Bleeker, 1856

Synonyms
- Ellerya Castelnau, 1873; Pseudogobiodon Bleeker, 1874

= Gobiodon =

Genus of fishes

Gobiodon is a genus of gobies also known as coral gobies or "clown gobies" (which can also mean the related genus Microgobius). Unlike the rest of the family Gobiidae, coral gobies, are not burrowers, instead they inhabit the branches of Acropora or similar hard corals.

As a group, they are small, most ranging about 6 cm, with exceptions. They have a fusiform shape.

Gobiodon burdigalicus from the Burdigalian (Miocene) of southwestern India is the first fossil (otoliths) record of this genus.

== Species ==
Accepted species in this genus include:

- Gobiodon acicularis Harold & R. Winterbottom, 1995 (Needlespine coral goby)
- Gobiodon albofasciatus Sawada & R. Arai, 1972 (Whitelined coral goby)
- Gobiodon aoyagii Shibukawa, T. Suzuki & Aizawa, 2013
- Gobiodon ater Herler, Bogorodsky & T. Suzuki, 2013 (Black coralgoby)
- Gobiodon atrangulatus Garman, 1903
- Gobiodon axillaris De Vis, 1884
- Gobiodon bicalvolineatus Hildebrandt, C. A., Froehlich, C. Y. M., Brodnicke, O. B., Klanten, O. S., Møller, P. R., & Wong, M. Y. L., 2024
- Gobiodon bilineatus Herler, Bogorodsky & T. Suzuki, 2013 (Two-lined coralgoby)
- Gobiodon brochus Harold & R. Winterbottom, 1999
- Gobiodon ceramensis (Bleeker, 1853)
- Gobiodon citrinus (Rüppell, 1838) (Poison goby)
- Gobiodon cobenjaminsis (Hildebrandt, C. A., Froehlich, C. Y. M., Brodnicke, O. B., Klanten, O. S., Møller, P. R., & Wong, M. Y. L, 2024)
- Gobiodon fulvus Herre, 1927
- Gobiodon fuscoruber Herler, Bogorodsky & T. Suzuki, 2013 (Brown-red coralgoby)
- Gobiodon heterospilos Bleeker, 1856
- Gobiodon histrio (Valenciennes, 1837) (Broad-barred goby)
- Gobiodon irregularis Herler, Bogorodsky & T. Suzuki, 2013 (Rufous coralgoby)
- Gobiodon limmoni Wibowo et al., 2026
- Gobiodon micropus Günther, 1861
- Gobiodon multilineatus H. L. Wu, 1979
- Gobiodon oculolineatus H. L. Wu, 1979
- Gobiodon okinawae Sawada, R. Arai & T. Abe, 1972 (Okinawa goby)
- Gobiodon prolixus R. Winterbottom & Harold, 2005
- Gobiodon quinquestrigatus (Valenciennes, 1837) (Five-lined coral goby)
- Gobiodon reticulatus Playfair (fr), 1867 (Reticulate goby)
- Gobiodon rivulatus (Rüppell, 1830) (Rippled coral goby)
- Gobiodon spadix Sato & Motomura 2024 (Akane Coral Goby)
- Gobiodon spilophthalmus Fowler, 1944
- Gobiodon winterbottomi T. Suzuki, Ko. Yano & Senou, 2012
- Gobiodon burdigalicus Carolin, Bajpai, Maurya & Schwarzhans, 2022 (otolith-based fossil species)
