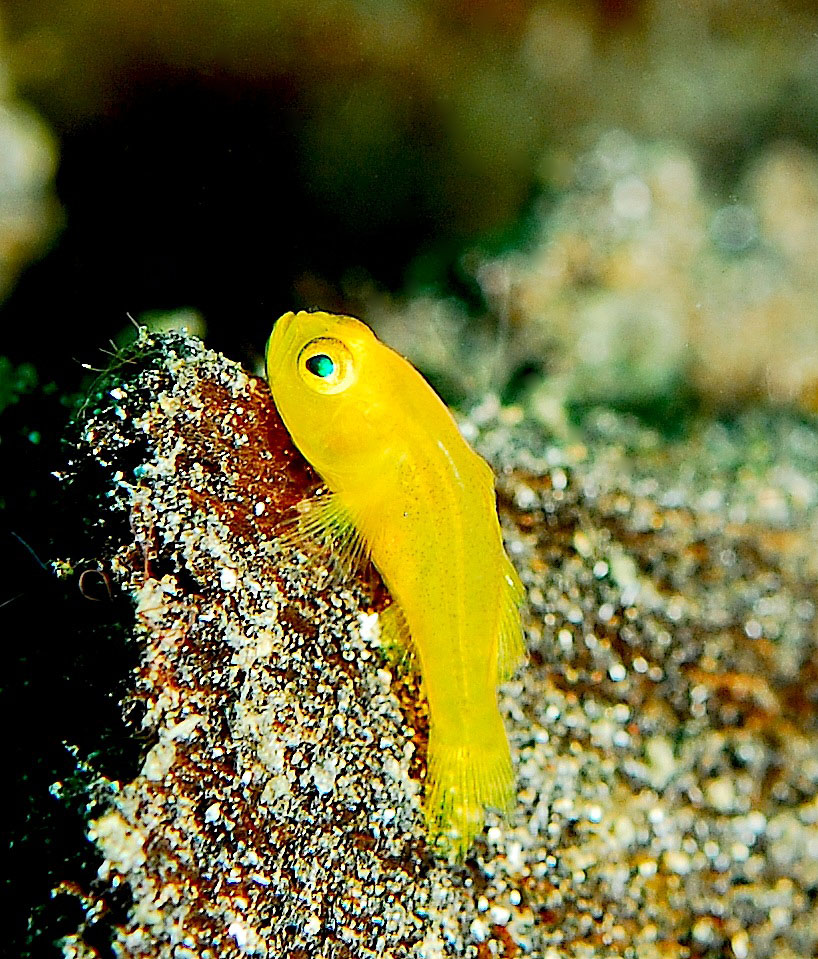

Conservation status
- Least Concern (IUCN 3.1)

Scientific classification
- Kingdom: Animalia
- Phylum: Chordata
- Class: Actinopterygii
- Division: Teleostei
- Order: Gobiiformes
- Family: Gobiidae
- Genus: Gobiodon
- Species: G. okinawae

Binomial name
- Gobiodon okinawae Sawada, Arai & Abe, 1972
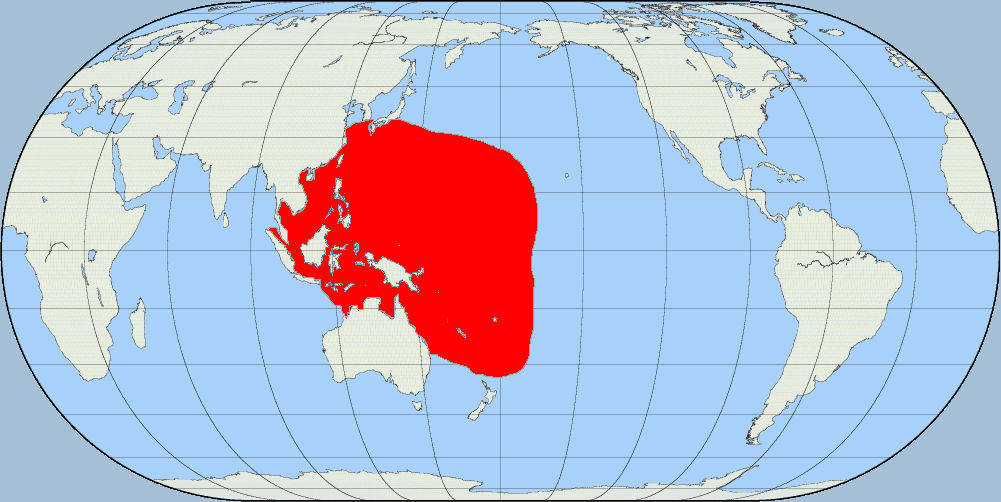
- Range of G. okinawae

= Yellow clown goby =

Species of fish

The yellow clown goby (Gobiodon okinawae), also known as the Okinawa goby or yellow coral goby, is a member of the goby family native to the western Pacific, from southern Japan (including Okinawa) to the southern reaches of the Great Barrier Reef. As the common name implies, this goby is bright yellow in color, save for a whitish patch on each cheek.

== Description ==
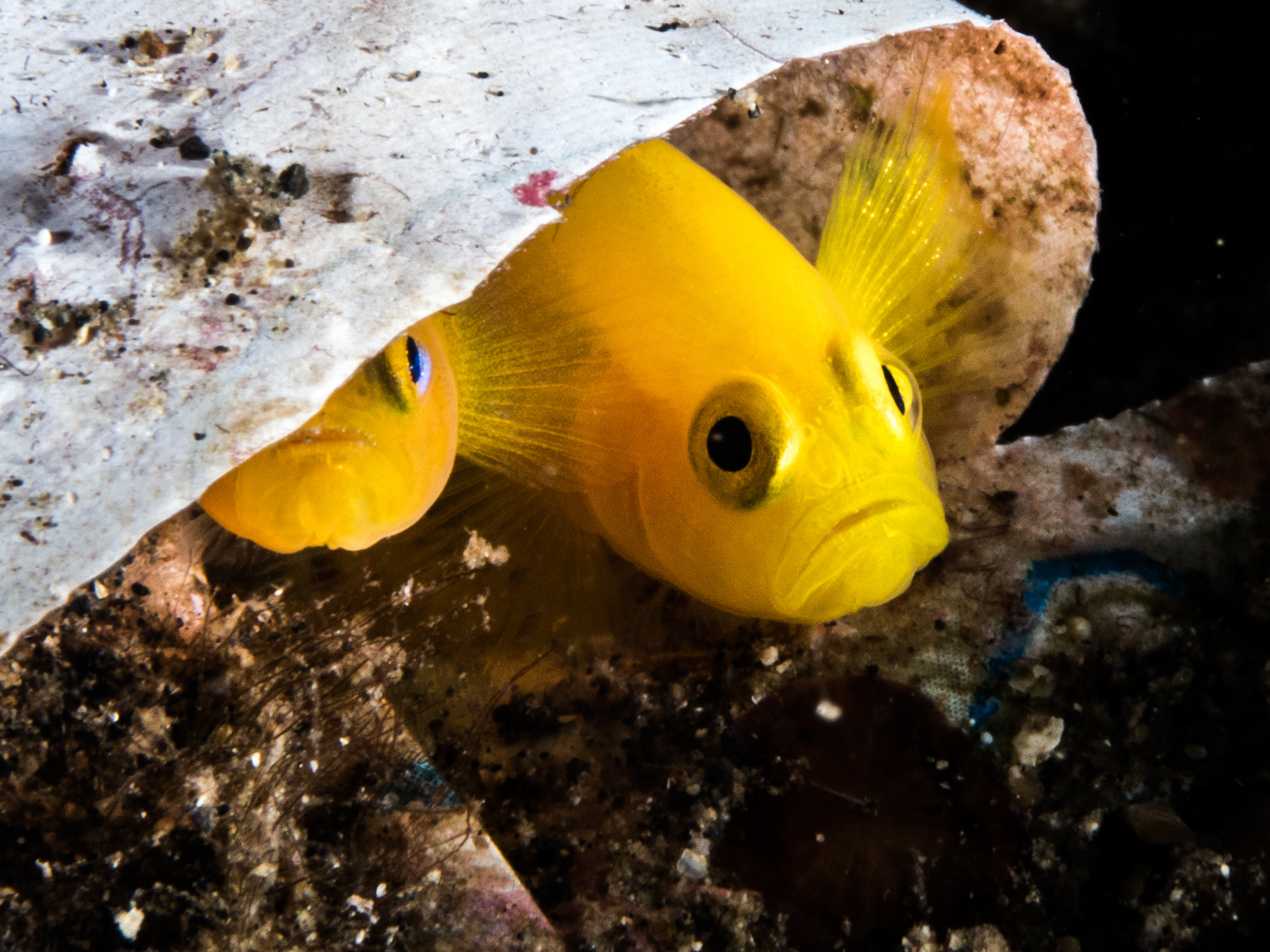
Head

The yellow clown goby is a fusiform fish. It has 7 dorsal spines, 10 dorsal rays, 1 anal spine, and 9 anal rays. At maturity, this goby may reach 3.5 cm in length. It is similar to the citrus goby (Gobiodon citrinus), but lacks the blue and white facial markings present in the latter species.

== Habitat ==
The yellow clown goby inhabits the coral reefs of sheltered lagoons. Unlike most gobies, which are burrowers, this goby (and other members of its genus) roosts in the outer branches of Acropora corals, in groups of 5–15 individuals.

== Behavior ==
The yellow clown goby is not generally aggressive, though it actively protects its territory against other yellow clown gobies (hence, in the small confines of an aquarium tank, this goby is best kept singly or as a breeding pair). The primary defense against predators is a poisonous, bitter mucus on the skin that makes this goby unpalatable.

== Feeding ==
The yellow clown goby is a planktivore, and its diet consists mainly of mesoplankton. It is an opportunistic feeder: the typical eating behavior is to wait for food to come into range, at which point it darts out to grab it and then immediately returns to its roost.

== Reproduction ==
Like other species in its genus, the yellow clown goby is a bidirectional protogynous hermaphrodite. It starts life always as a female and when paired up as adults, if the two fish are of the same sex, one changes sex to form a breeding pair. To be more precise, in the case of two females forming a pair, the larger of the two becomes male, and in the case of two males, the smaller changes sex to become female.

The eggs are laid in circular bands around coral branches in masses of up to a thousand. The male will immediately fertilize them and guard until hatching, about 5 days later. At about day 33, the fry undergoes metamorphosis and begins to settle. Coloration can be seen at about day 40.

== Conservation status ==
The yellow clown goby is listed as a least concern species on the IUCN Red List. This goby is highly resilient, with localized populations able to double within 15 months.

== In the aquarium ==
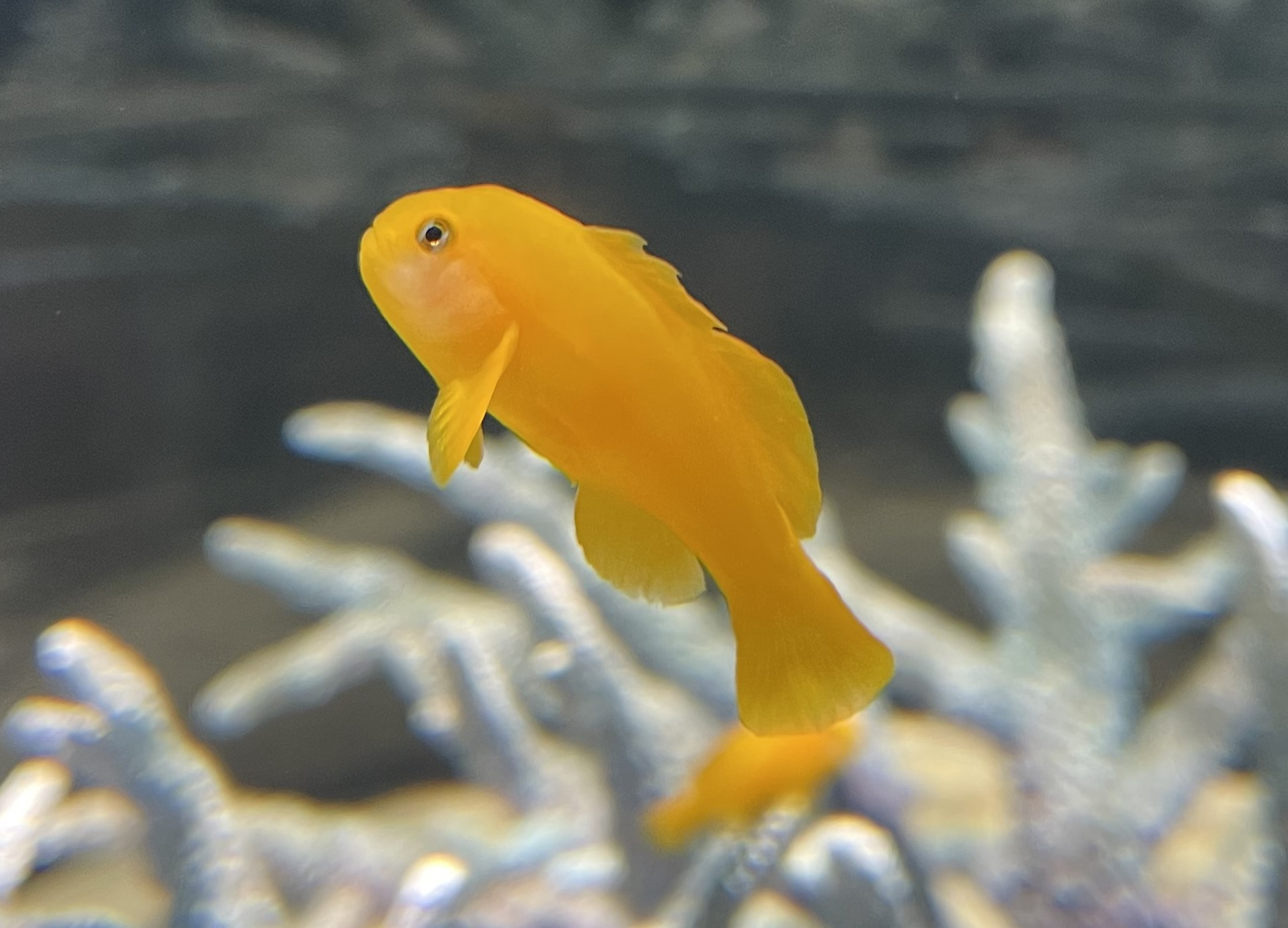
At NIFREL aquarium in Osaka, Japan

The yellow clown goby is popular with aquarists and is generally considered to be reef safe. It is especially suited to nano reef tanks because of its small size and the ability of the aquarist to closely monitor its health. Equally bright as its coloration is its personality; the yellow clown goby has a reputation of being friendly and entertaining. For instance, when perching in a favorite location, this goby may sometimes do what seems to be a dance, where it wiggles back and forth in an undulating motion while waving the fins.

The yellow clown goby does not readily take flake or pellet foods, instead preferring live or frozen. Suggested foods include live brine shrimp (fortified with phytoplankton to boost nutritional value), zooplankton, frozen or live mysis shrimp, and finely chopped silversides (a commonly available small fish sold fresh or frozen). Like many other marine species, this goby requires a varied diet to survive long-term in captivity, so regular feeding of at least 4 different kinds of foods is recommended.
