= Gobiodon atrangulatus =

Scientific classification
- Kingdom: Animalia
- Phylum: Chordata
- Class: Actinopterygii
- Order: Gobiiformes
- Family: Gobiidae
- Genus: Gobiodon
- Species: G. atrangulatus

Binomial name
- Gobiodon atrangulatus Garman, 1903

Species of fish

Gobiodon atrangulatus is a species of goby native to the western Pacific where it is known to occur around Japan (including the Ogasawara Islands and the Ryukyus) and Fiji. It inhabits tropical reefs where it is associated with Acropora corals. This species can reach a length of 3.5 centimetres (1.4 in) TL.
