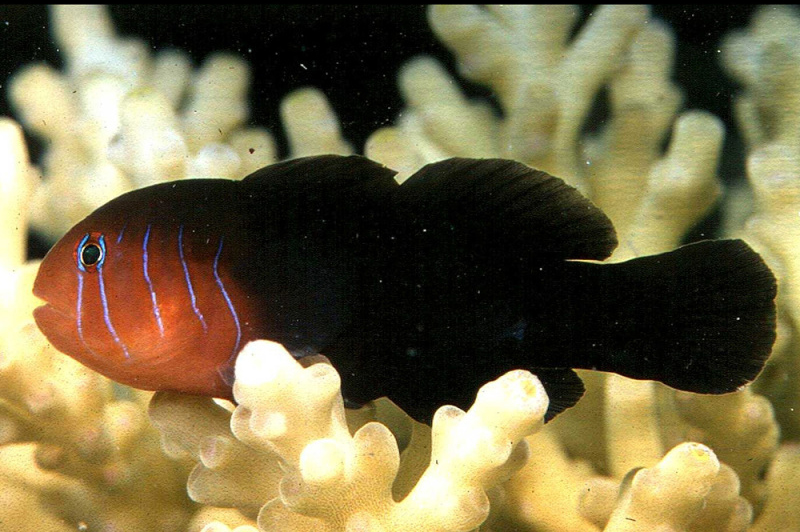

Scientific classification
- Kingdom: Animalia
- Phylum: Chordata
- Class: Actinopterygii
- Order: Gobiiformes
- Family: Gobiidae
- Genus: Gobiodon
- Species: G. quinquestrigatus

Binomial name
- Gobiodon quinquestrigatus (Valenciennes, 1837)

Synonyms
- Gobius quinquestrigatus Valenciennes, 1837

= Gobiodon quinquestrigatus =

Species of fish

Gobiodon quinquestrigatus, commonly known as the five-lined coral goby, is a species of goby. It occurs in the western Pacific from the Philippines to the Society Islands, north to Japan and south to Australia. It is normally found in monogamous pairs associating with corals of the genus Acropora. Its diet consists of small invertebrates and zooplankton. The female deposits the eggs on a coral branch which the male tends. They are able to change sex in whichever direction favours reproductive success. This species has a dark brown body colour with a lighter brown to reddish head which has five vertical blue lines, subadults have additional vertical lines on body.
