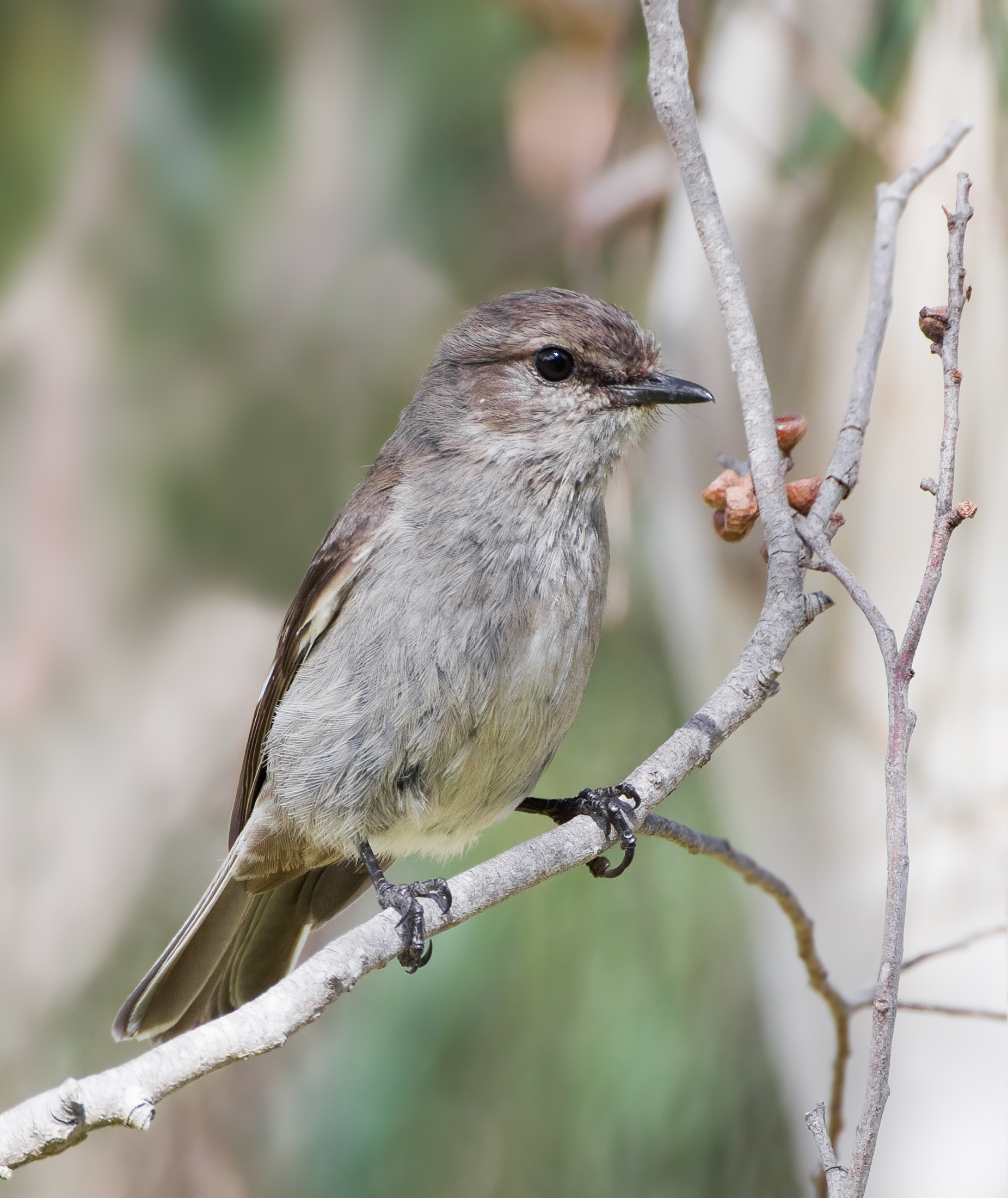

Conservation status
- Vulnerable (IUCN 3.1)

Scientific classification
- Kingdom: Animalia
- Phylum: Chordata
- Class: Aves
- Order: Passeriformes
- Family: Petroicidae
- Genus: Melanodryas
- Species: M. vittata

Binomial name
- Melanodryas vittata (Quoy & Gaimard, 1832)
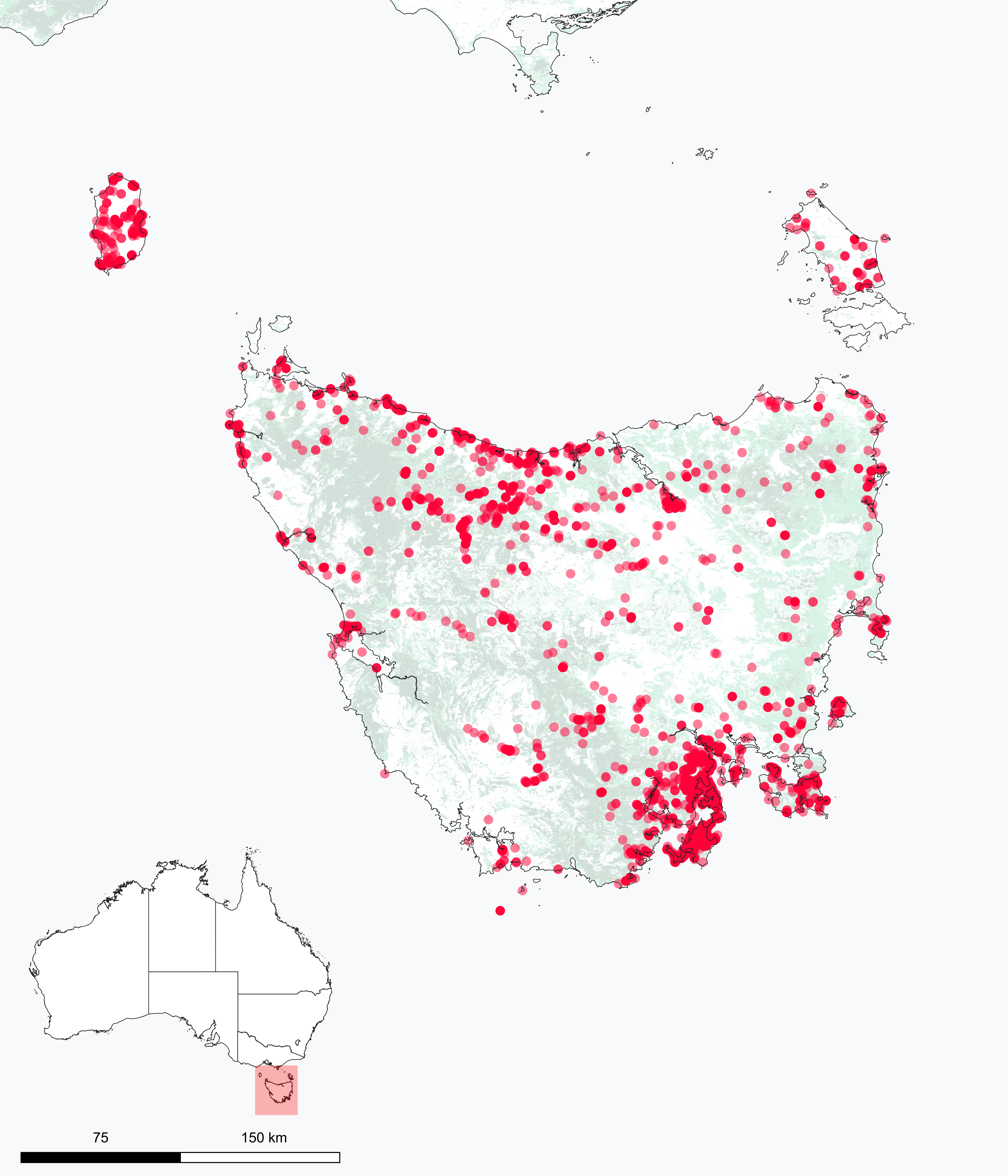

= Dusky robin =

Species of songbird native to Tasmania

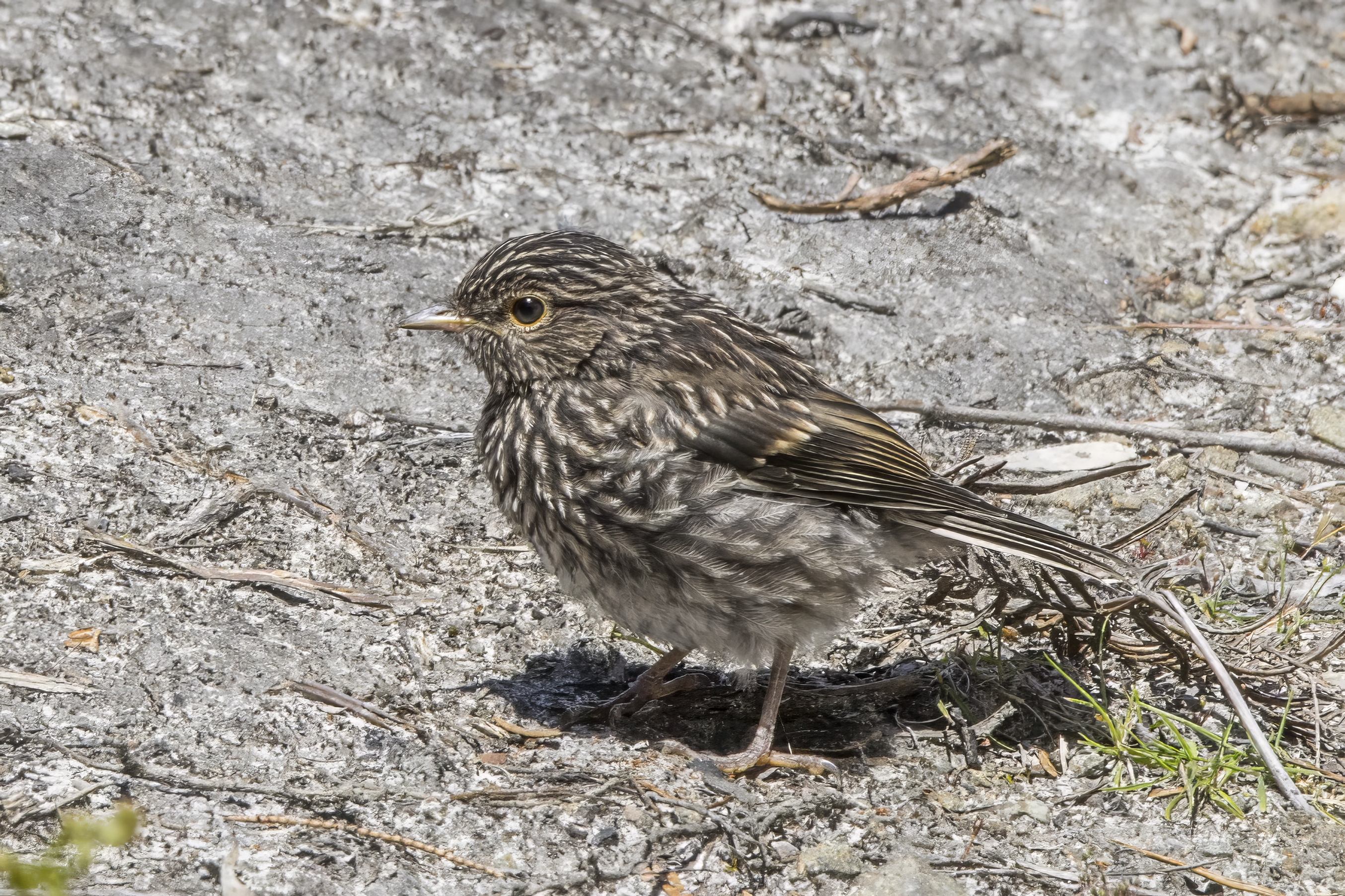
Juvenile

The dusky robin (Melanodryas vittata) is a small passerine bird native to Tasmania. A member of the Australian robin family Petroicidae, it is known by many other names such as Dozey, Sad, Sleepy, Stump, Tasmania/Wood Robin; Native Sparrow or Sad Bird.

This sombre dark brown robin is characterised by a narrow line, starting from behind the eye to the rear of the ear-coverts and white bars running down it wings. The origin of its binomial name was derived from a Latin word vittatus, which means 'banded'.

== Taxonomy ==
The dusky robin was described by the French zoologists Jean Quoy and Joseph Gaimard in 1832 based on a specimen that the authors mistakenly believed had been collected in "le port du Roi-Georges, à la Nouvelle-Hollande", but that had actually come from Tasmania.

They coined the binomial name, Muscicapa vittata. (Note: Although the ornithological part of the Voyage de la corvette l'Astrolabe has 1830 on the title page, the book was not published until 1832.) It was known for many years as Petroica vittata before being placed in its current genus Melanodryas. Two subspecies are recognised, one on the Tasmanian mainland and the other on King Island. 'Stump robin' was a name given to it by early settlers from its habit of sitting on stumps or posts. Other local names include 'wood robin' and 'sad robin'.

The Australian robins were classified for a time in the Old World flycatcher family Muscicapidae or the whistler family Pachycephalidae, before being placed in their own family Petroicidae, which is a compact built, rounded head, a short, straight bill and rounded wingtips robin. Sibley and Ahlquist's DNA-DNA hybridisation studies placed the robins in a Corvida parvorder comprising many tropical and Australian passerines, including pardalotes, fairy-wrens, honeyeaters, and crows. However, subsequent molecular research (and current consensus) places the robins as a very early offshoot of the Passerida, or "advanced" songbirds, within the songbird lineage.

== Description ==
Measuring from 14-16.5 centimetres in length, and weight around 27 grams, the dusky robin lacks the bright colours of its robin relatives. The bird has short, slender bill and a moderately long tail, and it is much larger than other Petroicidae that occur in Tasmania. It is almost impossible to differentiate male from female in the field. They have no seasonal variation nor sexual dimorphism.

However, there are large, noticeable differences between adults and juvenile dusky robins.

=== Juvenile ===
The juvenile dusky robin is black-brown on the top of its head and side of its neck, the side of the head is dark-brown in colour and heavily streaked off-white. Its chin and throat are mostly light grey-brown. The upper body is dark brown and heavily streaked off-white. The upper tail is also dark brown with indistinct pale pinkish-buff tip and edges. The wings are mostly dark brown, with prominent white or off-white to brownish-white tips or drosethorns to most coverts. There're also narrow and indistinct off-white strips along leading edges of the wings and an inconspicuous off-white to brownish-white central wing-bar across the bases of the remiges. The under body is mostly light grey-brown, diffusely streaked or mottled off-white and black-brown. The under-tail cover is light grey-brown with narrow off-white streaks. The bill is grey-black, the gape is yellow and puffy, iris are dark brown, with pale brown-grey legs and feet.

=== Adult ===
The adult dusky robin has brown feathers on the top of its head and on the sides of its neck. The distinctive lore and narrow dark-brown line extending from behind the eye to the ear-coverts, forming a dark eye-stripe, bordered above by cream supercilious that extends from the base of the bill and peters out above the rear ear-coverts. Below the eye-stripe, ear-coverts, dark brown streaked cream which are more coarsely below the lore, grading to off-white to very pale grey-brown chin and throat. The upper body is uniformly brown. The upper tail is dark brown with fine white sides and tip, folded wings are dark brown with narrow and indistinct white strip along the leading edge of the wings. The underbody is mostly light grey-brown, with greyish suffusion at the breast and diffuse off-white tips to undertail-coverts. The under tail is brown with fine white sides and tip. The underwing is mostly dark brown, with brown remiges but patterned similar to upper wing.

== Voice ==
The dusky robins are also known colloquially as the sad bird or sad robin due to its mournful, melancholic song. It is often described as low, monotonic Choo-wee, Choo-we-er, without any particular character, and its repertoire limited to a few low notes. They seldom sing, and it is more of an indication of their vivacity than musical taste. Their song can be heard throughout the year and it's often among the first sounds at dawn.

Some examples of their song can be heard here: https://ebird.org/media/catalog?taxonCode=dusrob1&sort=rating_rank_desc&mediaType=a&regionCode=

== Social organisation ==
This is little known because it is near impossible to distinguish between males and females while observing them in the field. However, they do occur in small groups, or pairs, especially in breeding season. Sometimes a small flock from 6–12 birds, with the largest being 20 birds, which can include many juveniles, can be observed during winter.

== Distribution and habitat ==
The dusky robin is endemic to Tasmania, where it is widespread. They have an open habitat, ranging from sea level to 1,200m above sea level. They usually occur in dry sclerophyll forest, but can also be found in coastal heathland, sedge land and Button Grass plains. They, however, favour ecotones, between forests and clearings or recently burnt area.

== Breeding ==
The breeding season is from July to December, and one or two broods are raised. Dusky robins are cooperative breeders, where two or three, presumably male, adult robins can look after a nest by feeding the female who is incubating the eggs.

=== Nesting ===
The nest of the dusky robin is often large, untidy and cup-shaped, placed in a fork in a tree or stump, often a fire-blackened one. Materials for nest consist of rootlets, strips of bark, twigs, grass, stems of edges and pieces of fern-frond, bound with spider webs, often on a base of twigs and lined with grass, rootlets, fine bark, plant-down, hair, fur, feathers and wool.

=== Eggs and clutch-size ===
The clutch consists of two to four pale olive- to blue-green oval or elongated-oval eggs, splotched with darker green and brown, with close-grained or finely textured, smooth and glossy, measuring 22 mm × 17 mm (0.87 in × 0.67 in).

=== Incubation and parental care ===
Eggs are incubated by females only, in which they are fed on or near nest by male or any other helpers present. Incubation period usually last about 15 days. After the chicks are hatched, nestlings and feedings are carried out by both parents, along with any other helpers present. Parents feed and attend fledglings up to one month, and young accompany parents for at least 6–7 weeks after fledging.

== Notes ==
b. There are numerous sources that were referenced by the Handbook of Australian, New Zealand & Antarctic birds that wikipedia were unable to find.

c. Distribution map taken from https://ebird.org/species/dusrob1
