= Gobiodon acicularis =

Scientific classification
- Kingdom: Animalia
- Phylum: Chordata
- Class: Actinopterygii
- Order: Gobiiformes
- Family: Gobiidae
- Genus: Gobiodon
- Species: G. acicularis

Binomial name
- Gobiodon acicularis Harold & R. Winterbottom, 1995

Species of fish

Gobiodon acicularis, the needlespine coral goby, is a species of goby native to the western central Pacific Ocean where it is an inhabitant of tropical coral reefs and eelgrass beds from Indonesia to Palau. It grows to a length of 3.9 centimetres (1.5 in) SL.
