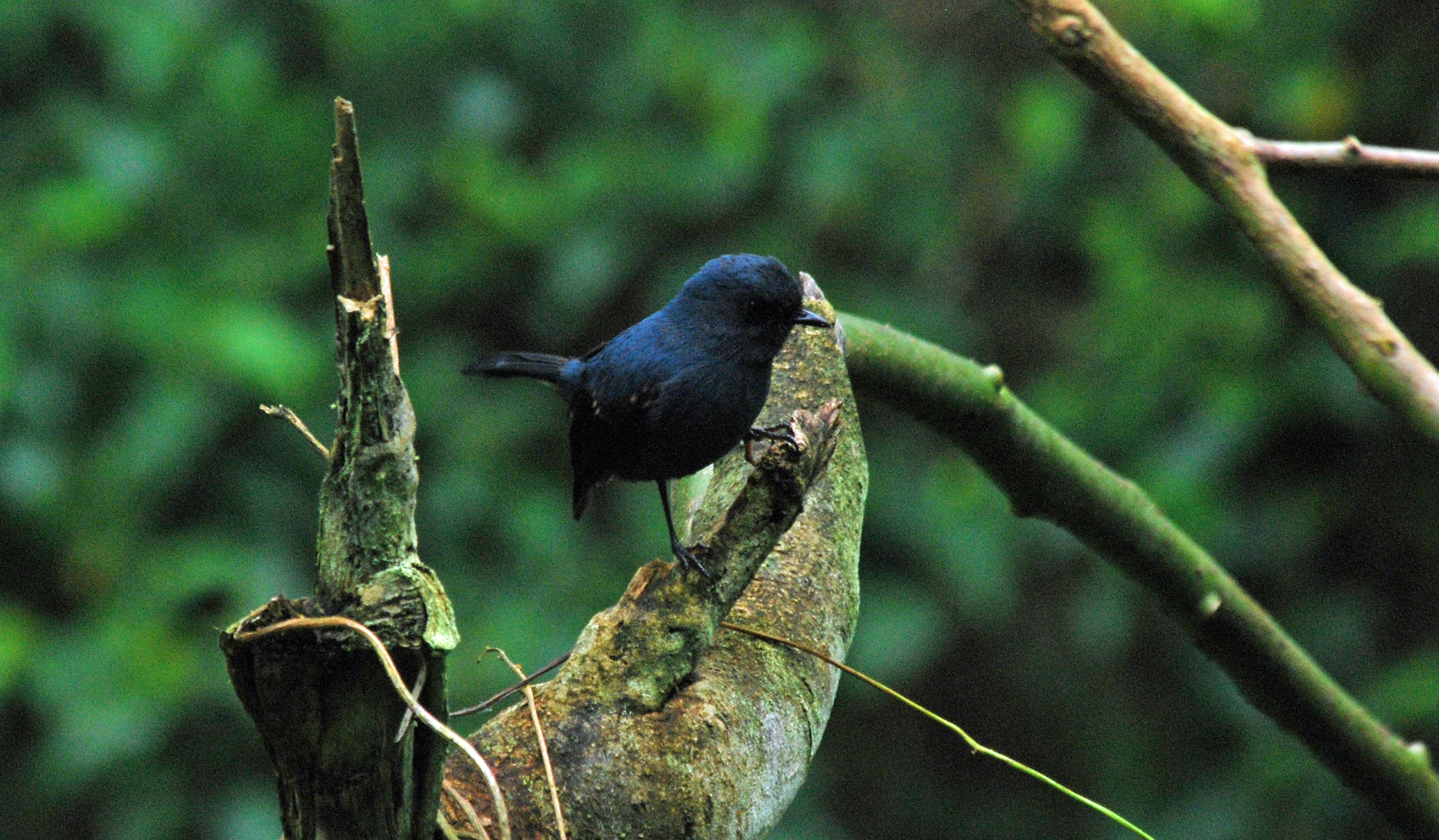

Conservation status
- Least Concern (IUCN 3.1)

Scientific classification
- Kingdom: Animalia
- Phylum: Chordata
- Class: Aves
- Order: Passeriformes
- Family: Petroicidae
- Genus: Melanodryas
- Species: M. cyanus

Binomial name
- Melanodryas cyanus (Salvadori, 1874)

Synonyms
- Myiolestes cyanus Salvadori, 1874; Poecilodryas cyana (Salvadori, 1874); Poecilodryas cyanea (lapsus); Poecilodryas cyanopsis Sharpe, 1901; Poecilodryas cyanus salvadorii Rothschild & Hartert, 1900 (non Madarász, 1900: preoccupied); Poecilodryas subcyanea de Vis, 1897; Peneothello cyanus

= Slaty robin =

Blue-grey robin

Species of songbird native to New Guinea

The slaty robin (Melanodryas cyanus), also known as the blue-grey robin, is a species of bird in the Australasian robin family Petroicidae. It is endemic to the New Guinea Highlands and sparsely in the island's northern areas. Its natural habitat is subtropical or tropical moist montane forests.

== Taxonomy ==
The slaty robin was formally described in 1874 as Myiolestes ? cyanus by the Italian zoologist Tommaso Salvadori based on a specimen that had been collected by Luigi D'Albertis at Hatam in the Arfak Mountains or northwest New Guinea. The specific epithet is from Ancient Greek κυανος/kuanos meaning "dark-blue". The slaty robin was formerly placed in the genus Peneothella, but in 2025 Peneothello was merged into a more broadly defined Melanodryas. This change was based on the results of a 2011 molecular genetic study of the Australasian robins by Les Christidis and coworkers.

Three subspecies are recognised:

- M. c. cyanus (Salvadori, AT, 1874) – mountains of Bird's Head Peninsula (western New Guinea)
- M. c. atricapilla (Hartert, EJO & Paludan, KJ, 1934) – mountains of central and northern New Guinea eastward to Hindenburg Range, including Wandammen, Foja, Cyclops, and Bewani–Torricelli mountains
- M. c. subcyanea (De Vis, CW, 1897) – montane central highlands, northeastern (including Adelbert Mountains and Huon Peninsula), and southeastern New Guinea

== Description ==
Measuring 14 to 15 cm (5.5 to 5.9 in), the slaty robin has fairly uniform blue-grey plumage, which is slightly lighter underneath and slightly darker on the cheeks and face. The tail and flight feathers are grey-black. The bill and feet are black, and the eyes are dark brown.

== Distribution and habitat ==
The slaty robin is found in the highlands of New Guinea from altitudes of 900 to 2,750 m (2,950 to 9,020 ft). Within the rainforest it is found in pairs in the understory or on the ground. It is insectivorous, and hunts by gleaning. It eats ants, beetles, and thynnid wasps.

== Behaviour ==
The nest is a deep cup made of rootlets and lined with moss, and is generally placed in a tree fork around 6 m (20 ft) above the ground. One or two pale-greenish or olive eggs, splotched with olive or brown, are laid, and measure 23.5 mm x 17–19 mm.
