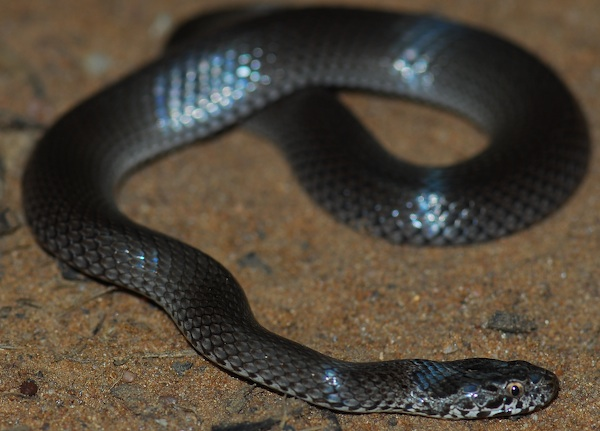

Conservation status
- Data Deficient (IUCN 3.1)

Scientific classification
- Kingdom: Animalia
- Phylum: Chordata
- Class: Reptilia
- Order: Squamata
- Suborder: Serpentes
- Family: Elapidae
- Genus: Denisonia
- Species: D. maculata

Binomial name
- Denisonia maculata (Steindachner, 1867)

= Ornamental snake =

Species of snake

The ornamental snake (Denisonia maculata) is a small elapid snake found in the Brigalow Belt (both North and South) and Desert Uplands bioregions of Queensland, Australia. Ornamental snakes grow to about 40 centimetres in length and appear to be primarily frog eaters. They are nocturnal, and are thought to shelter in soil cracks during the day. They tend to be found in areas of deeply cracking, alluvial soils.

While not generally regarded as dangerous to humans, bites from this species may result in localised swelling and loss of consciousness. Large specimens should be treated with caution.
