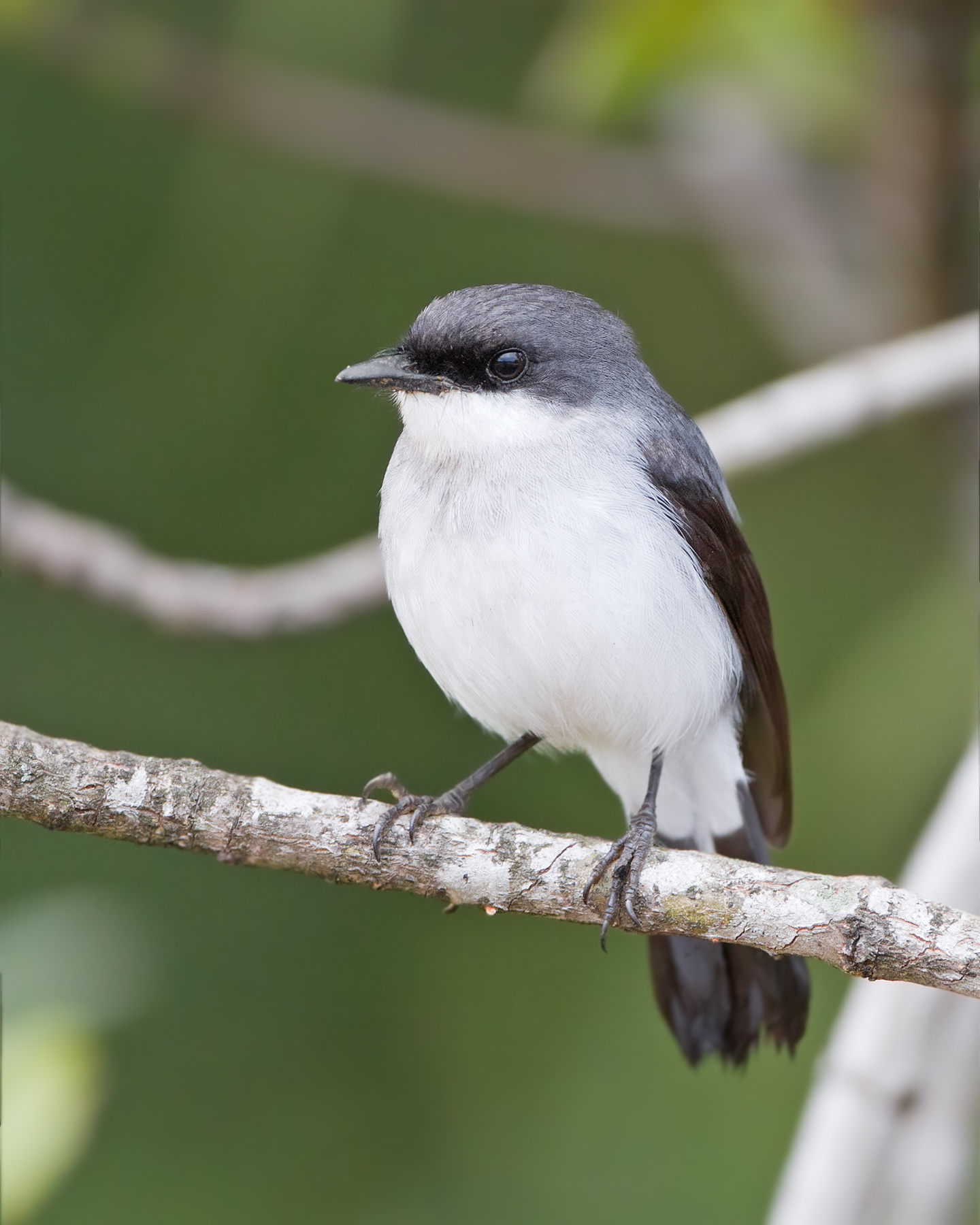
- In Cairns, Queensland, Australia

Conservation status
- Least Concern (IUCN 3.1)

Scientific classification
- Kingdom: Animalia
- Phylum: Chordata
- Class: Aves
- Order: Passeriformes
- Family: Petroicidae
- Genus: Melanodryas
- Species: M. pulverulenta

Binomial name
- Melanodryas pulverulenta (Bonaparte, 1850)

Synonyms
- Peneonanthe pulverulenta; Eopsaltria pulverulenta; Peneothello pulverulenta

= Mangrove robin =

Species of bird native to New Guinea and Australia

The mangrove robin (Melanodryas pulverulenta) is a passerine bird in the Australasian robin family Petroicidae. It is found in the Aru Islands, New Guinea, and northern Australia. The bird's common name refers to its natural habitat. It lives in mangrove forests and seldom flies outside these biomes.

== Taxonomy ==
The mangrove robin was formally described in 1850 as Myiolestes pulverulentus by the French naturalist Charles Lucien Bonaparte from a specimen collected in New Guinea. The type location was restricted to the Utanata River in southern New Guinea by Ernst Mayr in 1941. The specific epithet is from Latin meaning "dusty" or "powdered". The species was subsequently moved to the genus Peneoenanthe by the Australian ornithologist Gregory Mathews in 1920. Based on the results of a 2011 molecular phylogenetic study of the Australasian robins by Les Christidis and coworkers, the mangrove robin was moved to the genus Peneothello. In 2025 the AviList checklist merged the genus Peneothello into an expanded Melanodryas.

There are four subspecies.

- M. p. pulverulenta (Bonaparte, 1850) – coastal New Guinea
- M. p. leucura (Gould, 1869) – Aru Islands (south west of New Guinea), northeast coast of Australia
- M. p. alligator (Mathews, 1912) – coastal northern Australia and nearby islands
- M. p. cinereiceps (Hartert, 1905) – northwest coast of Australia

== Description ==
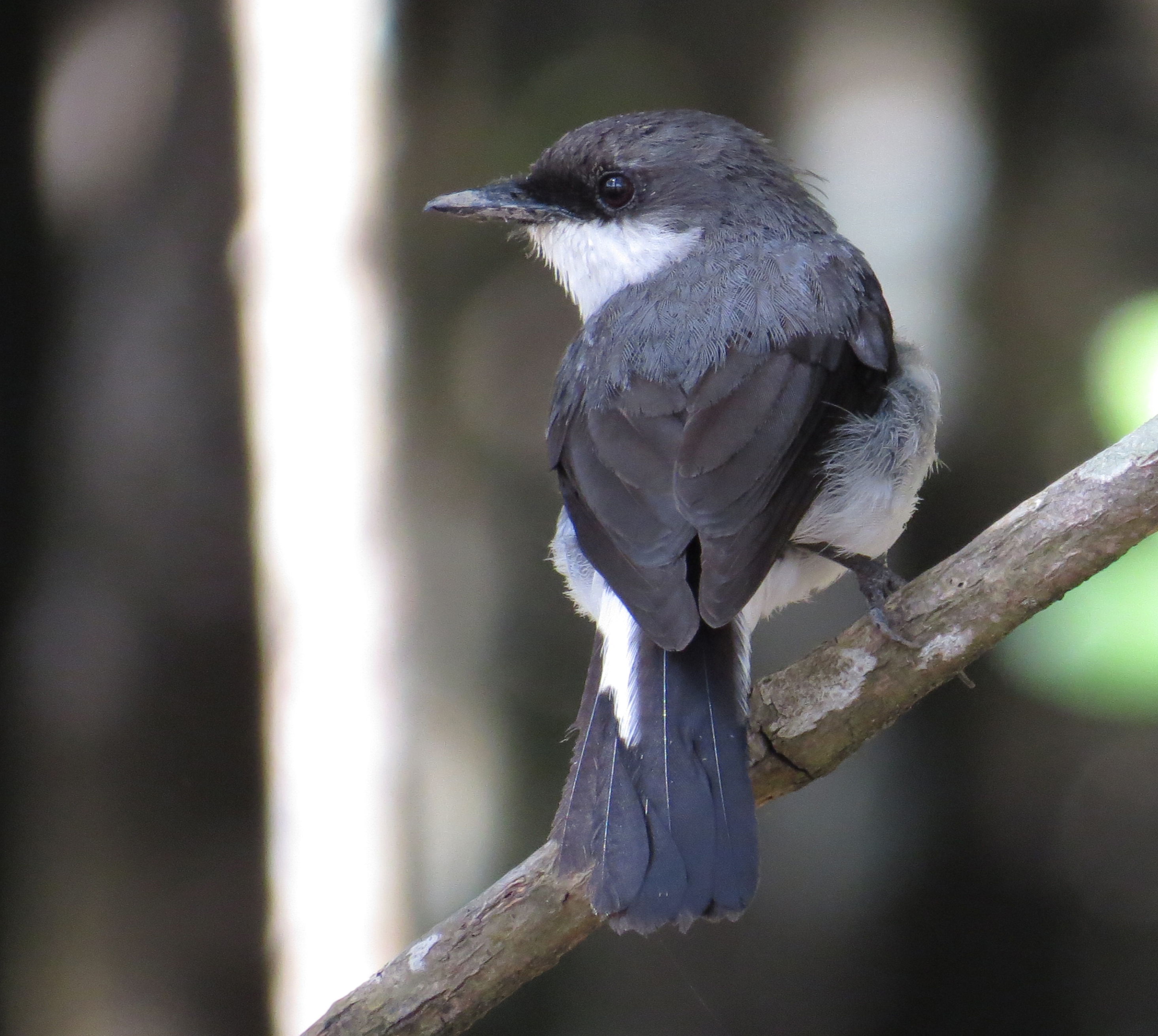
Dorsal view of mangrove robin showing white in outer rectrices

The mangrove robin has an average weight of 21.3 grams (0.75 oz) for males and 17.3 grams (0.61 oz) for females. Their wingspan differs between subspecies – the leucura subspecies have spans of 86 millimetres (3.4 in) to 90 millimetres (3.5 in) for males and 77 millimetres (3.0 in) to 84 millimetres (3.3 in) for females, while the alligator subspecies have spans of 82 millimetres (3.2 in) to 87 millimetres (3.4 in) for males and 76 millimetres (3.0 in) to 80 millimetres (3.1 in) for females. For cinereiceps, male birds have wingspans of 80 millimetres (3.1 in) to 84 millimetres (3.3 in) long; on the other hand, female wingspans are 76 millimetres (3.0 in) to 78 millimetres (3.1 in) long. They feature a "dull pale bar" at the bottom of their remiges, although this is not very noticeable. In order to facilitate their navigation through thick mangrove forests, mangrove robins have developed wings and tails that are rounded.

== Distribution and habitat ==
The bird is found in the Northern Australia region and the island of New Guinea, within the countries of Australia, Indonesia, and Papua New Guinea. Their preferred habitat are tropical and subtropical mangrove forests located above the level of high tide. They seldom travel outside their habitat.

== Behaviour ==
The call of the mangrove robin has been described as a "down-slurred whistle". It eats insects in the mud when the tide falls. While these may be its primary prey, the mangrove robin also consumes a significant amount of crab in its diet.

== Conservation status ==
The mangrove robin has been placed in the least Concern category of the IUCN Red List, as the population has remained stable throughout the last ten years. The size of its distribution range is over 426,000 square kilometres (164,000 sq mi).
