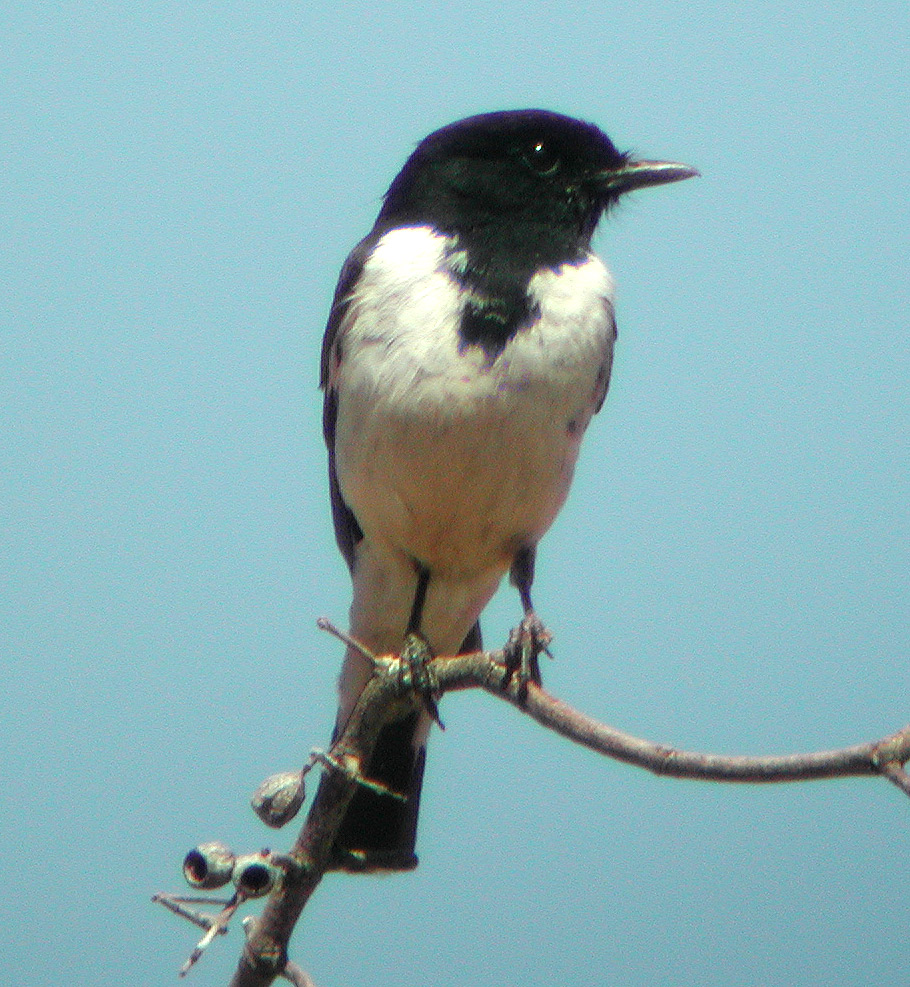
- Hooded robin (Melanodryas cucullata)

Scientific classification
- Kingdom: Animalia
- Phylum: Chordata
- Class: Aves
- Order: Passeriformes
- Family: Petroicidae
- Genus: Melanodryas; Gould, 1865

Type species
- Muscicapa cucullata Latham, 1801

Species
- 7; see text

Synonyms
- Peneothello Mathews, 1920

= Melanodryas =

Genus of birds

Melanodryas is a genus of passerine birds in the Australasian robin family Petroicidae. These species are found in New Guinea and Australia.

The genus was introduced by the English ornithologist and bird artist John Gould in 1865 with Muscicapa cucullata Latham, the hooded robin, as the type species. The genus name combines the Ancient Greek melanos "black" with dryad "tree-nymph".

== Species ==
The genus contains the following seven species:

Image	Common name	Scientific name	Distribution
	Dusky robin	Melanodryas vittata	Tasmania and Bass Strait islands (southeast Australia)
	Hooded robin	Melanodryas cucullata	Australia (except far north and Tasmania)
	White-rumped robin	Melanodryas bimaculata	New Guinea
	Mangrove robin	Melanodryas pulverulenta	coastal New Guinea and north Australia
	White-winged robin	Melanodryas sigillata	montane central, east New Guinea
	Slaty robin	Melanodryas cyanus	montane New Guinea
	Smoky robin	Melanodryas cryptoleuca	montane west New Guinea
