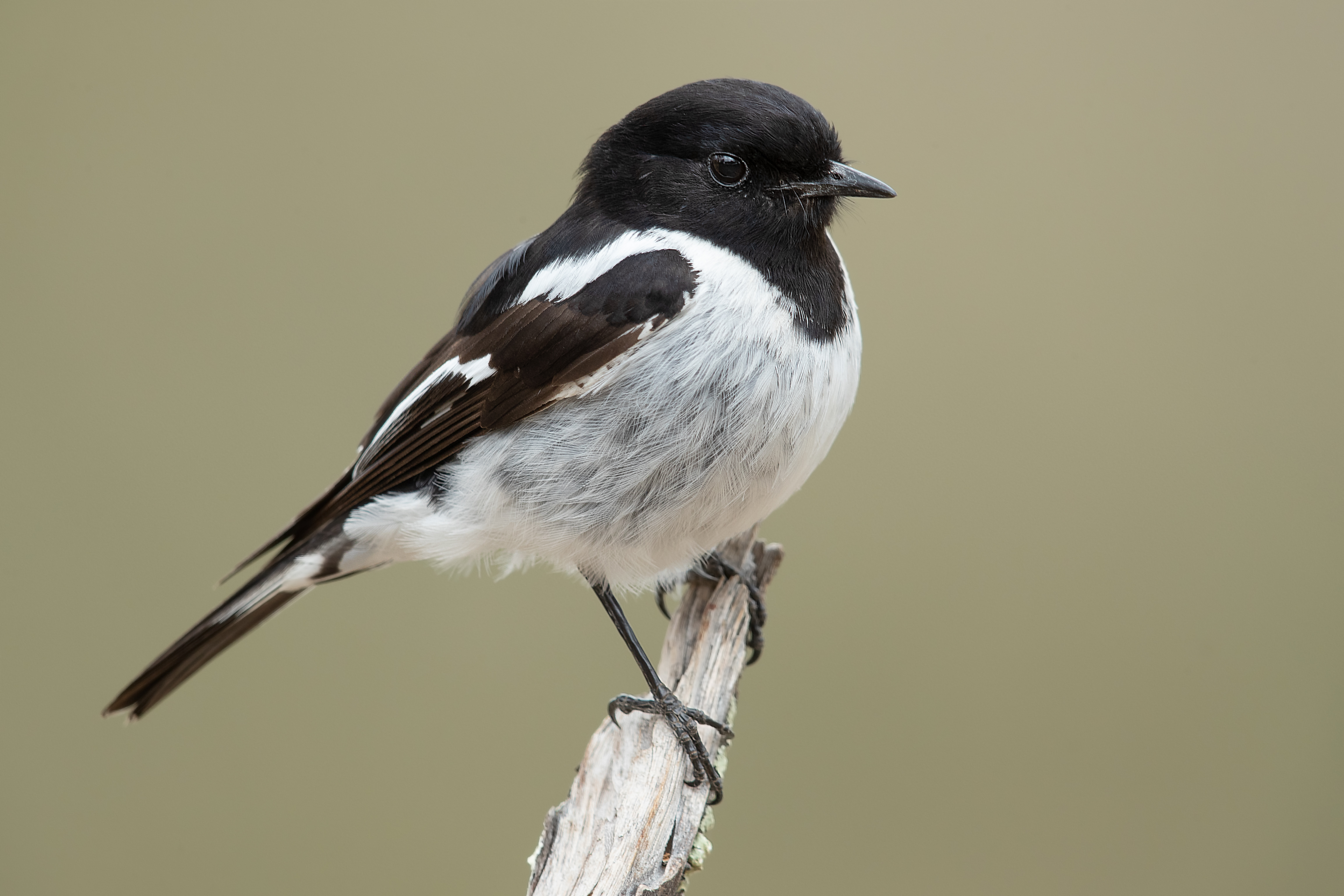
- Male, Glen Davis
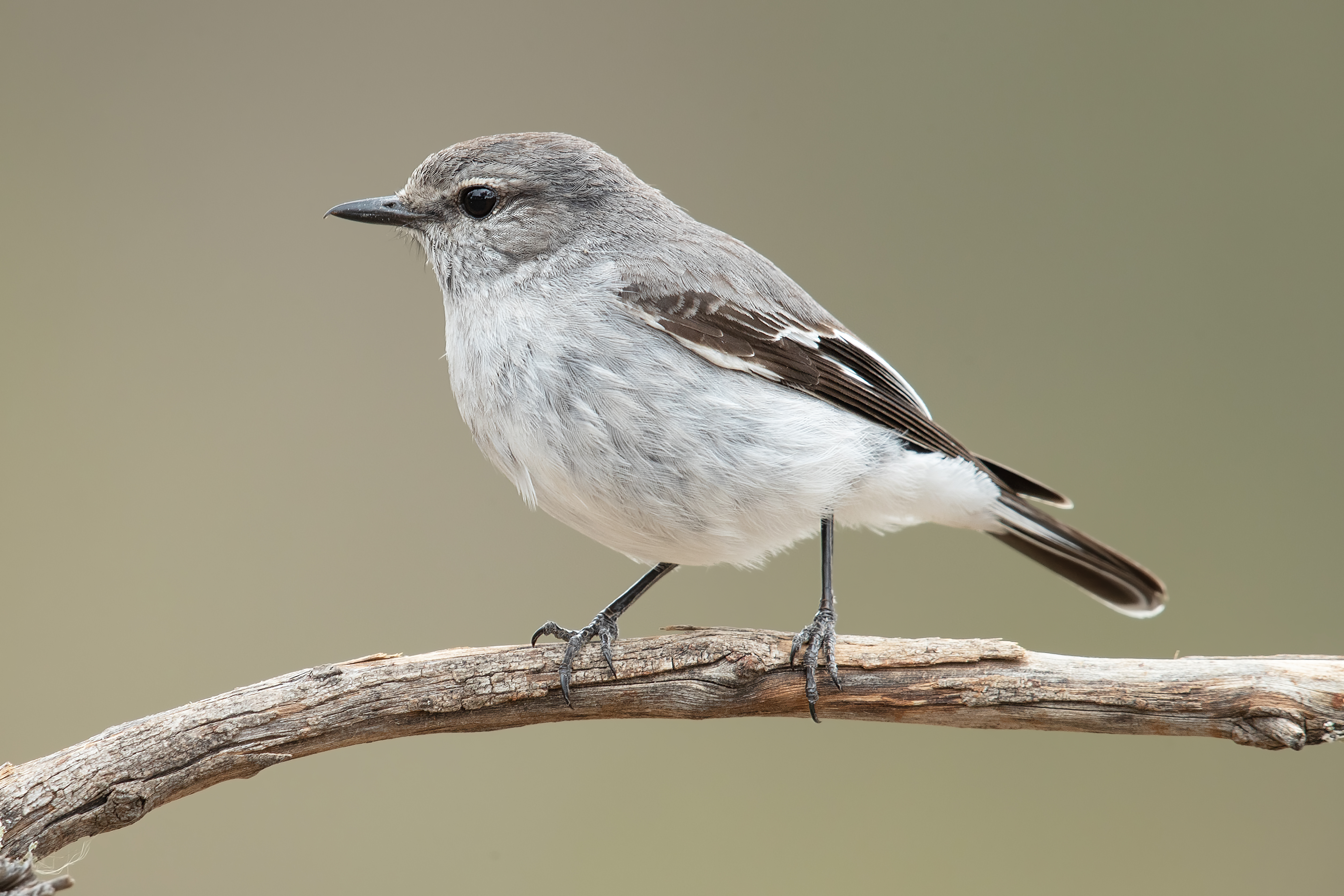
- Female, Glen Davis

Conservation status
- Least Concern (IUCN 3.1)

Scientific classification
- Kingdom: Animalia
- Phylum: Chordata
- Class: Aves
- Order: Passeriformes
- Family: Petroicidae
- Genus: Melanodryas
- Species: M. cucullata

Binomial name
- Melanodryas cucullata (Latham, 1801)

= Hooded robin =

Species of songbird native to Australia

The hooded robin (Melanodryas cucullata) is a small passerine bird native to Australia. Like many brightly coloured robins of the Petroicidae, it is sexually dimorphic; the male bears a distinctive black-and-white plumage, while the female is a nondescript grey-brown.

== Taxonomy ==
Like all Australian robins, it is not closely related to either the European robin or the American robin, but belongs rather to the Corvida parvorder comprising many tropical and Australian passerines, including pardalotes, fairy-wrens, and honeyeaters, as well as crows. Initially thought to be related to Old World flycatchers, it was described as Muscicapa cucullata by the English ornithologist John Latham in 1801. Later described as Grallina bicolor by Nicholas Aylward Vigors and Thomas Horsfield, it was later placed in the genus Petroica for many years before being transferred to Melanodryas.

The generic name melanodryas derives from the Greek melas 'black' and dryas 'wood-nymph'. The specific name cucullata derives from Late Latin cucullatus meaning 'hooded'.

=== Subspecies ===
Four subspecies are recognised

- Melanodryas cucullata cucullata (Lathan, 1801)
- Melanodryas cucullata melvillensis (Zietz, 1914)
- Melanodryas cucullata westralensis (Matthews, 1912)
- Melanodryas cucullata picata (Gould, 1895)

Differences primarily relate to size and plumage, with males displaying subtle differences in plumage of ventrum, upperparts and degree of white colouring on tail tips. M. c. melvillensis is the smallest of the four subspecies, but has a proportionally longer bill, while M. c. cucullata is the largest (as measured by wing span), but has the shortest bill.

Confirmation of M. c. westralensis and M. c. picata as subspecies is in dispute. A mitochondrial and nuclear DNA study on a limited number of specimens suggested that M. c. westralensis belonged to a separate clade, whereas M. c. picata and M. c. cucullata were in the same clade. Further analysis is needed to confirm initial DNA findings as overlaps in the distribution ranges of the various subspecies (excluding M. c. melvillensis) are recognised.

== Description ==
The hooded robin is around 16 cm (6 in) in length and weighs an average of 22 grams.

The male has a distinctive pied coloration, with a black head and neck ("hood") and a white stripe along its shoulder. It has a white chest and underparts. The male's black wings have white wing bars and the square-ended tail is white tipped underneath with distinctive white panels on the dorsal side, each of which are clearly visible in flight. The eyes, bill, and feet are also black.

The female is an undistinguished grey-brown above, with a pale grey throat and paler underneath, and dark brown wings and white wing bars.

Juveniles transition through several moults over a 3-year period. Juvenile males initially have dark brown plumage surrounding the head, and upper body sometimes with lighter brown or off-white tips. Breast feathers are dark brown and mottled, but wings retain distinctive lighter coloured bar on wing and tail from an early age, which aids in identification. The darker brown plumage is replaced in successive moults to the black hood of the adult in approximately 50% of males, by the beginning of the third year. Juvenile females more closely resemble adult females, but with darker brown colouring of the juvenile feathers. which are subsequently replaced upon moulting to the lighter brown grey of the adult female.

== Distribution ==
Historical records of the Tiwi hooded robin indicate its presence on both Bathurst and Melville Islands. The south-eastern hooded robin is found from far southeast Queensland, through to the southeast corner of South Australia. Distribution of M.c. picata and M. c. westralensis extends through the northern arid and southwestern arid regions of Australia, respectively, with overlap in the central arid regions.

The hooded robin is not found in Tasmania, on the Nullarbor Plain, Cape York or inland around the Simpson Desert.

== Ecology ==
=== Behaviour ===
Hooded robins are sedentary birds, frequently observed in pairs or small groups. Though normally a quiet bird, male birds call in the early morning. They have a fast, undulating flight pattern, mostly over small distances and catch invertebrates by pouncing on them from an exposed perch close to the ground.

Male hooded robins have been observed to show aggressive, chasing behaviour to other ground foraging insectivores, including jacky winters and willie wagtails. Injury-feigning displays, including tumbling along the ground, have been observed in both sexes, to distract potential predators and humans that encroach upon occupied nests.

=== Breeding ===
Breeding season is from July to November with one or two broods raised. The nest is a neat cup made of soft, dry grass and bark. Spider webs, feathers, and fur are used for binding and filling, generally in a tree crevice, hollow or fork. The clutch generally consists of two pale olive- or bluish-green eggs, with darker spots and blotches, measuring 21 mm × 16 mm (0.83 in × 0.63 in).

Females build the nest and incubate the eggs for approximately 15 days. Males forage and feed females while nesting, only brooding themselves for short periods of less than 2 minutes at a time. Assistance in feeding the young and fledglings can sometimes be provided by other members of the small groups with which they reside.

=== Habitat ===
The hooded robin shows a preference for dry open forests, combining acacia and eucalypts with shrubs that offer perching positions relatively close to the ground. It further benefits from nearby native grass cover with open patches and a complex blend of logs, fallen branches and deeper soils, which provide ideal breeding conditions for small lizards and arthropods – their preferred diet.

Thick patches of exotic grasses and extensive grassless areas, limit the hooded robin's foraging success. Though previously recorded as present in wetter forests near Armidale, New South Wales, surveys in the last 15 years have failed to confirm its presence.

== Conservation status ==
The Australian Environment Protection and Biodiversity Conservation Act 1999 currently lists two of the four subspecies in its 'Species Profiles and Threats Database'

- M. c. melvillensis was listed as Critically Endangered (possibly extinct) on May 11th 2018. The last known verified sighting was on Bathurst Island in 1992.
- M. c. cucullata was listed as Endangered on March 31st 2023, primarily on the basis that the existing population was deemed to have reduced by > 50% in the last 10 years (one generation 3.0 years) as evidenced by repeated bird surveys in known locations.
- The hooded robin is listed as Vulnerable under the Victorian Flora and Fauna Guarantee Act (1988).

=== Threats ===
Numerous threats to the long-term viability of the hooded robin have been identified.

Historically high nest predation rates are being exacerbated by altered fire regimes and ongoing reduction in size of quality habitat. Reduced high quality habitat is further impacted by territorial competition with other species, not the least of which is the noisy miner. Extensive land clearing for agriculture and the subsequent habitat loss and fragmentation are considered medium risks to the hooded robin's survival. Their ground foraging behaviours also make them susceptible to predation by feral cats. Furthermore, extended droughts limiting food resources and changing land-use have been attributed to the disappearance of hooded robins from previously populated areas.
