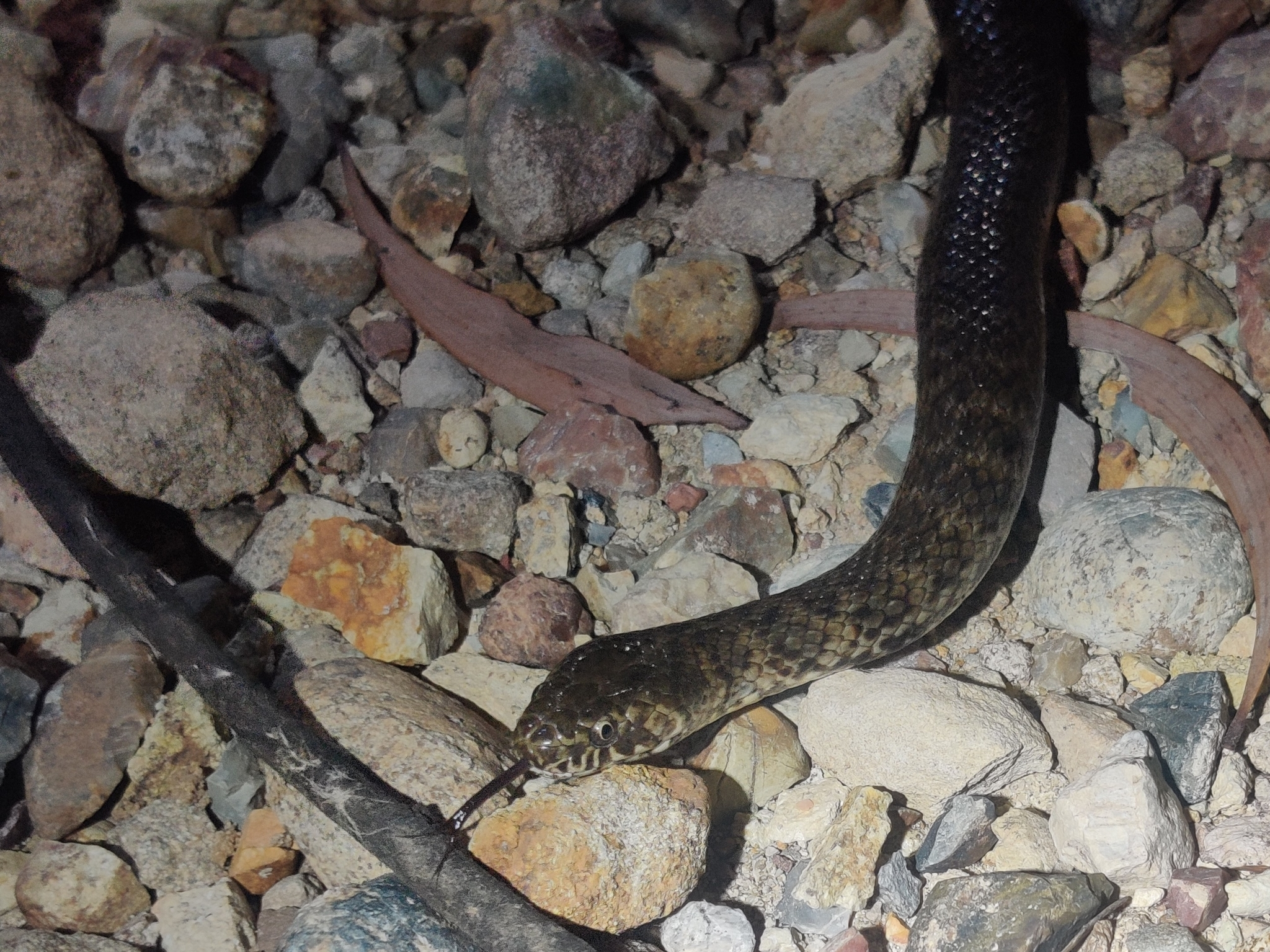

Conservation status
- Least Concern (IUCN 3.1)

Scientific classification
- Kingdom: Animalia
- Phylum: Chordata
- Class: Reptilia
- Order: Squamata
- Suborder: Serpentes
- Family: Elapidae
- Genus: Denisonia
- Species: D. devisi

Binomial name
- Denisonia devisi (Waite & Longman, 1920)
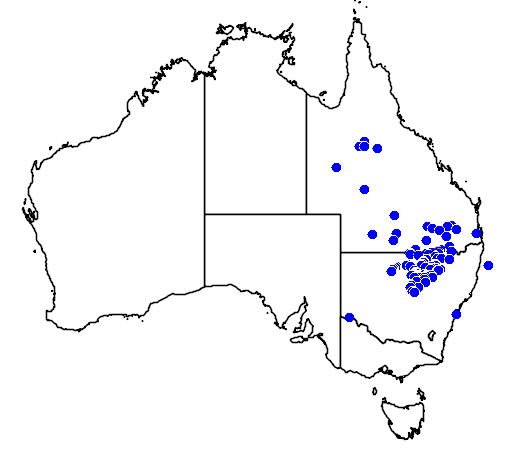
- Distribution of D. devisi

Synonyms
- Hoplocephalus ornatus De Vis, 1884 (non Denisonia ornata Krefft, 1869); Denisonia maculata var. devisi Waite & Longman, 1920 (nomen novum pro Hoplocephalus ornatus); Denisonia devisi — Cogger, 1983

= Mud adder =

Species of snake

The mud adder (Denisonia devisi), also known commonly as Devis's banded snake, is a species of venomous snake in the family Elapidae. The species is endemic to certain regions of eastern Australia, including South West Queensland, northern New South Wales, north-west Victoria, and (more recently) South Australia. Its scientific and common names refer to Charles Walter De Vis.

== Taxonomy ==
This species was first described by Charles Walter De Vis, the first director of the Queensland Museum, from whom both the scientific name and one of its common names are derived. In 1884 he described it as Hoplocephalus ornatus.

In 1920 Waite and Longman decided to place it in the genus Denisonia. However, since Krefft in 1869 had named a different species Denisonia ornata, that name could not be used. Waite and Longman therefore created the new name Denisonia maculata var. devisi. Subsequently, Cogger in 1983 raised it to full species status as Denisonia devisi.

== Description ==
Denisonia devisi is short, thick, and slightly flat. The eyes are set at the top of the head and have a conspicuous iris. The dorsal surface of the body is yellowish-brown to olive-green in colour, broken by irregular, ragged-edged, narrow, dark bands running across the body. De Vis' banded snake is sometimes confused with death adders, as both have thick, banded bodies. The main difference is that the De Vis' banded snake's tail does not taper abruptly, and its head is not broad and triangular.

== Distribution and habitat ==
The De Vis' banded snake was thought to be confined to alluvial flats in Queensland and New South Wales.

However, when mammal expert Peter Menkhorst reported a death adder in north-west Victoria, an expedition was carried out in November 2005 to survey the Wallpolla Islands. Instead of finding a death adder, the survey identified a De Vis' banded snake for the first time in Victoria. Further confirmation of the species' new habitat came with a report on the results of raising water levels for environmental purposes at several sites along the Murray River at the Victoria - New South Wales border, making special note of the snake. The snake was found in Wallpolla Island Park, a 9,800-hectare (24,000-acre) area consisting of floodplain vegetation in the extreme North West, on the Victoria-New South Wales border. It was a designated "Icon Site", an area of high ecological value within the Murray-Darling basin. The new addition to Victorian snakes was probably carried south during a period of flooding in the Darling River. The usually dry habitat had become more suitable over the years as water and biodiversity increased due to environmental water.

In late 2021, sightings of several of the snakes at Chowilla Game Reserve, near Renmark, in the Riverland region of South Australia were confirmed by the South Australian Museum to be the first seen in South Australia.

== Behaviour ==
The mud adder inhabits low-lying areas, particularly near sites subjected to seasonal flooding. It feeds mainly on frogs, and ambushes their prey. They are nocturnal in warm weather, and inhabit soil cracks.

The mud adder gives birth to a fully formed young with an average total length (including tail) of 11 cm (4.3 in). A litter consists of three to 11, five on average, baby snakes.

== Conservation status ==
The mud adder's conservation status is that of least concern on the IUCN Red List and under Queensland's Nature Conservation Act 1992.
