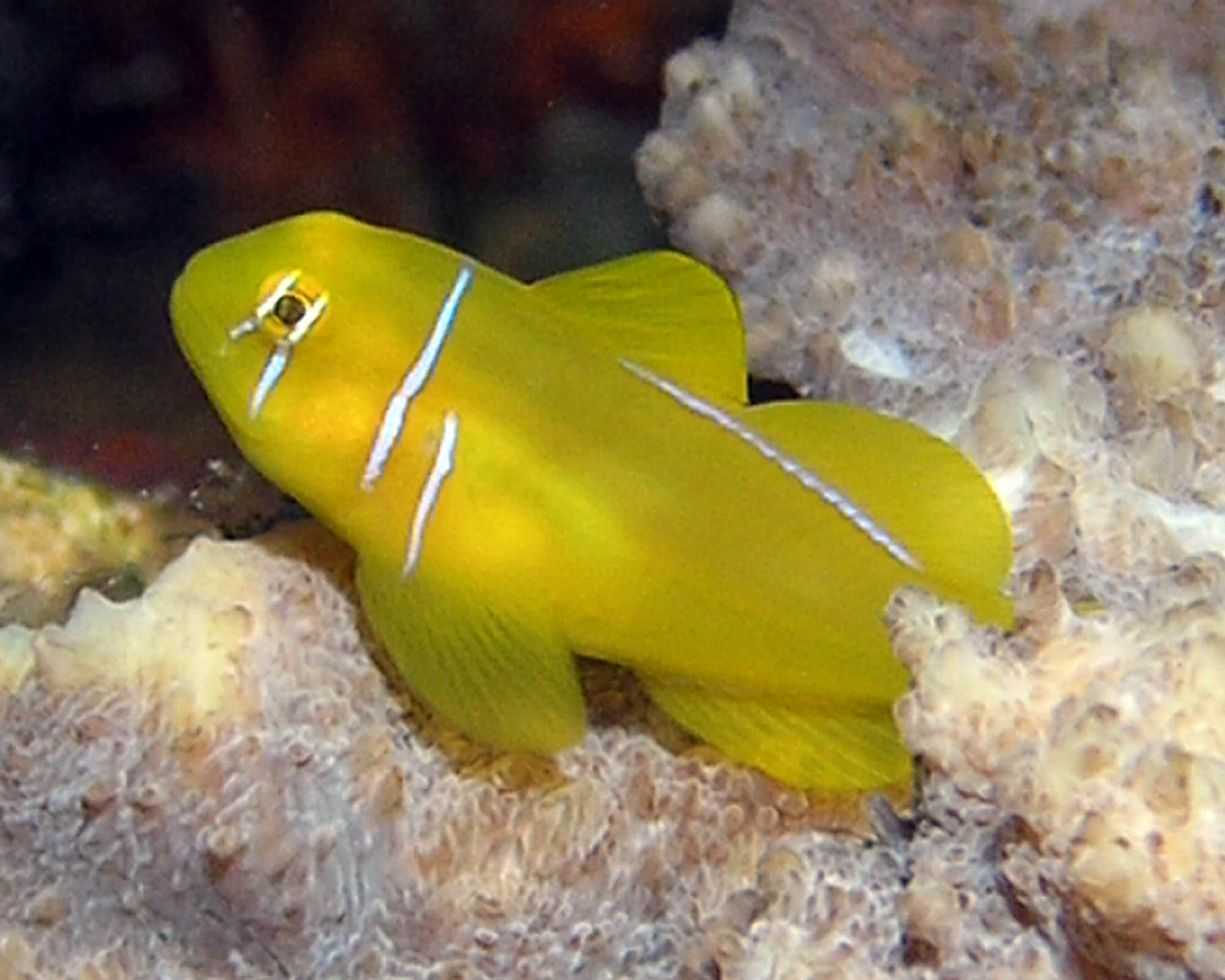

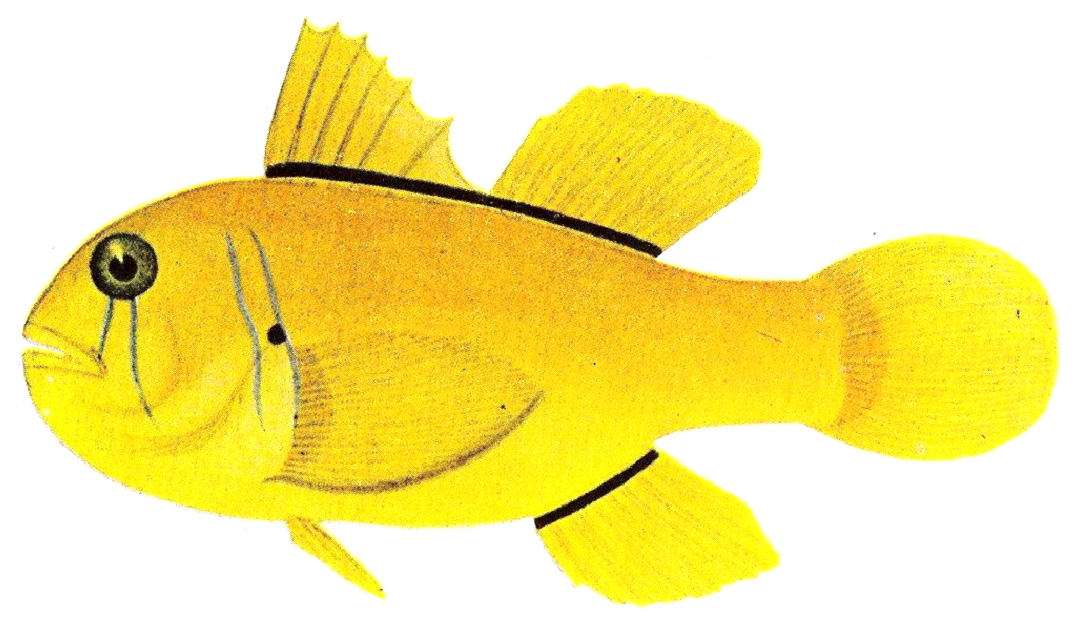

Conservation status
- Least Concern (IUCN 3.1) (Global)

- Endangered (IUCN 3.1) (Persian Gulf)

Scientific classification
- Kingdom: Animalia
- Phylum: Chordata
- Class: Actinopterygii
- Order: Gobiiformes
- Family: Gobiidae
- Genus: Gobiodon
- Species: G. citrinus

Binomial name
- Gobiodon citrinus (Rüppell, 1838)

Synonyms
- Gobius citrinus Rüppell, 1838; Gobiodon hypselopterus Bleeker, 1875

= Gobiodon citrinus =

Species of goby

Gobiodon citrinus, the poison goby, is a species of goby native to the Indian Ocean from the Red Sea and the coast of Africa to the western Pacific Ocean to Japan, Samoa and the Great Barrier Reef. They are reef dwellers being found at depths of from 2 to 20 metres (7 to 66 ft) and in association with Acropora corals. The mucus produced by this fish is toxic. They grow to a length of 6.6 centimetres (2.6 in) TL. They have varied body colour and could be either dark brown, or pale yellow. They also have blue vertical lines that go around their eyes and gills. This species is also found in the aquarium trade and has been reared in the aquarium.
