= Charles Walter De Vis =

English biologist (1829–1915)

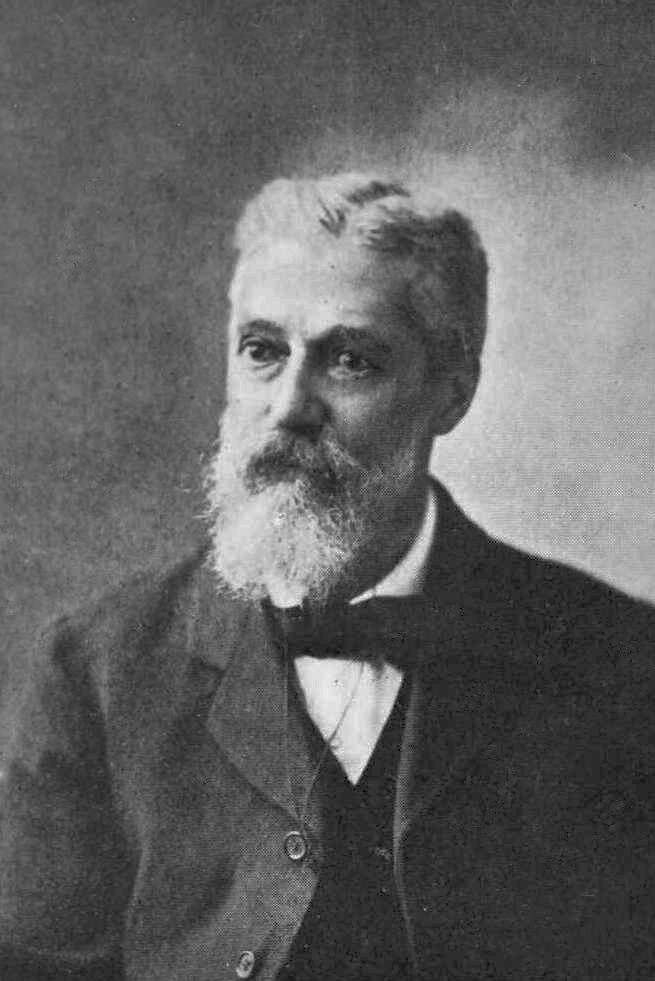
Charles Walter De Vis

Charles Walter de Vis (9 May 1829 – 30 April 1915) was an English zoologist, ornithologist, herpetologist and botanist.

== Life and career ==
He was born Charles Devis; he changed the spelling to De Vis about 1882.

De Vis gained a BA from Magdelene College, Cambridge in 1849, became a deacon in 1852, and was rector of Breane, Somerset, from 1855 to 1859. He gave up his ecclesiastical functions to devote himself to science, initially in England then after 1870 in Australia. De Vis also wrote under the name of Thickthorn, the name of his home in Rockhampton.

He was a founder member of the Royal Society of Queensland, serving as president from 1888 to 1889, and a founder member and first vice-president of the Royal Australasian Ornithologists Union.

His principal work concerned the fossil birds of Queensland (Darling Downs) and southern Australia (Cooper Creek), but he also described a number of extant bird species. In fact, he was more successful at the latter, because due to insufficient knowledge of stratigraphy and evolution, he—like many ornithologists of his time—mistook subfossil remains of extant birds for the remains of extinct prehistoric species.

Among species he described were the white-winged robin in 1890, and the frill-necked monarch in 1895.

De Vis also worked in the scientific field of herpetology, and he described many new species of reptiles.

De Vis is commemorated in the scientific name of an Australian venomous snake, Denisonia devisi.

== See also ==
- Category:Taxa named by Charles Walter De Vis
