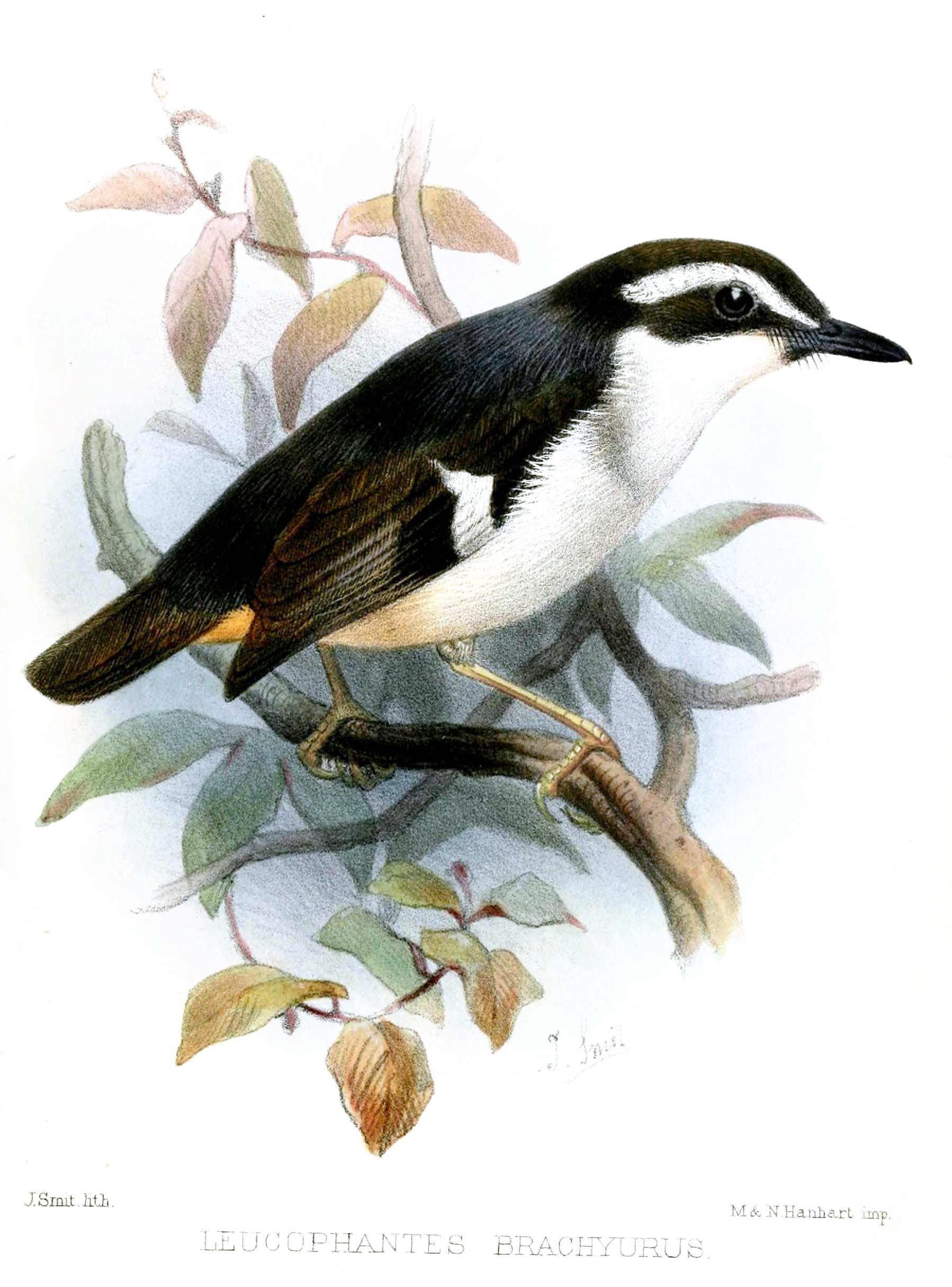

Conservation status
- Least Concern (IUCN 3.1)

Scientific classification
- Kingdom: Animalia
- Phylum: Chordata
- Class: Aves
- Order: Passeriformes
- Family: Petroicidae
- Genus: Leucophantes; Sclater, PL, 1874
- Species: L. brachyurus

Binomial name
- Leucophantes brachyurus Sclater, PL, 1874

= Black-chinned robin =

Species of bird

The black-chinned robin (Leucophantes brachyurus) is a species of bird in the Australasian robin family Petroicidae. It is the only species placed in the genus Leucophantes. It is found in northern New Guinea where its natural habitat is subtropical or tropical moist lowland forests.

== Taxonomy ==
The black-chinned robin was formally described in 1874 by the English zoologist Philip Sclater under the binomial name Leucophantes brachyurus. He specified the type locality as Hatam, Arfak Mountains. This was changed by Ernst Mayr in 1941 to Andai, northwestern New Guinea. It was formerly placed in the genus Poecilodryas but has now been returned to the resurrected genus Leucophantes that Sclater had originally introduced for this species.

Three subspecies are recognised:

- L. b. brachyurus Sclater, PL, 1874 – Bird's Head Peninsula (northwest New Guinea) and southwest sector of northwest New Guinea
- L. b. albotaeniatus (Meyer, AB, 1874) – Yapen (Geelvink Bay Islands, northwest New Guinea) and west north central New Guinea
- L. b. dumasi (Ogilvie-Grant, 1915) – east north central New Guinea

Sibley and Ahlquist's DNA-DNA hybridisation studies placed this group in a Corvida parvorder comprising many tropical and Australian passerines, including pardalotes, fairy-wrens, honeyeaters, and crows. However, subsequent molecular research (and current consensus) places the robins as a very early offshoot of the Passerida (or "advanced" songbirds) within the songbird lineage.

== Description ==
Measuring 14 to 15 cm (5.5 to 6 in), the black-chinned robin has a dark brown to black head and upperparts, with a prominent white stripe or "eyebrow" above the eye. The chin is black immediately under the bill. Its tail is markedly shorter than other Australasian robins. The throat and underparts are white, and there is a white bar on the otherwise dark-plumaged wing. The bill is black, the eyes are dark brown, and the legs pale brown or pink. Its song is a descending series of notes, which resembles that of the fan-tailed cuckoo.

== Distribution and habitat ==
The black-chinned robin is found predominantly in the lowland forests of northwestern and central New Guinea (mainly in West Papua and only a little in Papua New Guinea's northwest) from sea level to 650 m (2,130 ft). Within the rainforest it is found in pairs in the understory or on the ground. It is insectivorous, and hunts by gleaning. It is a weak flyer.
