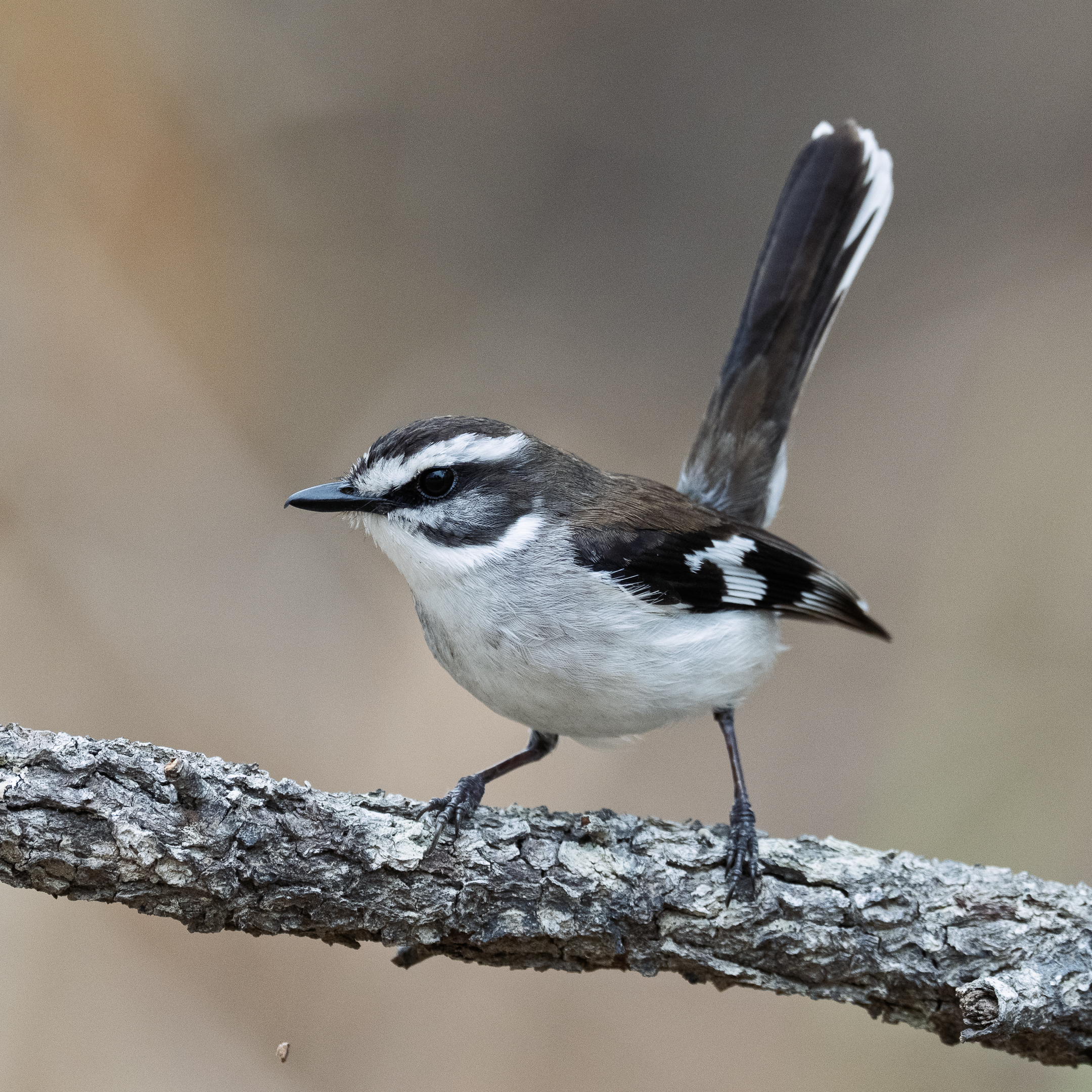

Conservation status
- Least Concern (IUCN 3.1)

Scientific classification
- Kingdom: Animalia
- Phylum: Chordata
- Class: Aves
- Order: Passeriformes
- Family: Petroicidae
- Genus: Poecilodryas
- Species: P. superciliosa

Binomial name
- Poecilodryas superciliosa (Gould, 1847)

= White-browed robin =

Species of bird

The white-browed robin (Poecilodryas superciliosa) is a species of bird in the family Petroicidae. It is endemic to north-eastern Australia. Its natural habitats are forest, woodland and scrub, often near water. It formerly included the buff-sided robin as a subspecies.

The white-browed robin was described by the naturalist John Gould in 1847; the genus name is derived from the Ancient Greek words poekilos 'spotted' and dryas 'dryad'. The species name is derived from the Latin word supercilium 'eyebrow'. It is a member of the Australasian robin family Petroicidae. Sibley and Ahlquist's DNA-DNA hybridisation studies placed this group in a Corvida parvorder comprising many tropical and Australian passerines, including pardalotes, fairy-wrens, honeyeaters, and crows. However, subsequent molecular research (and current consensus) places the robins as a very early offshoot of the Passerida, or "advanced" songbirds, within the songbird lineage.

The white-browed robin has, as its name suggests, a prominent white marking resembling an eyebrow above its eyes. It has olive-brown upperparts, with a white patch on the wings. The underparts are pale, the breast pale grey and belly white. The bill is black and the eyes are dark brown.

It is endemic to Australia, where it is found from the Cape York Peninsula south to the Burdekin River in Queensland.

Breeding occurs from August or September to February or March, with one or two broods per season. The nest is a neat cup made of bark and grass. Spider webs, feathers, and fur are used for binding or filling, and the outside is decorated by lichen or bits of bark . The nest is generally placed in a tree-fork or hanging vine, a few metres above the ground. A clutch of two eggs is laid. The eggs are cream to buff, and marked with brown splotches and spots, usually concentrated around the large end, and measure 20 by 15 mm.
