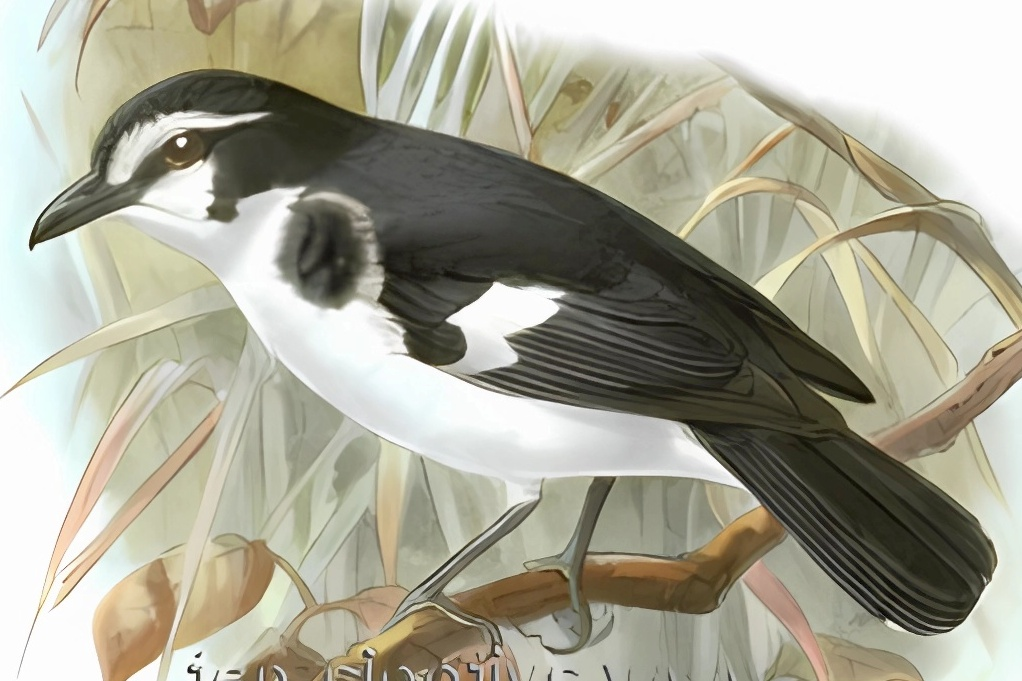
- Illustration by J. G. Keulemans, c. 1894

Conservation status
- Least Concern (IUCN 3.1)

Scientific classification
- Kingdom: Animalia
- Phylum: Chordata
- Class: Aves
- Order: Passeriformes
- Family: Petroicidae
- Genus: Poecilodryas
- Species: P. hypoleuca

Binomial name
- Poecilodryas hypoleuca (G.R. Gray, 1859)

= Black-sided robin =

Species of bird

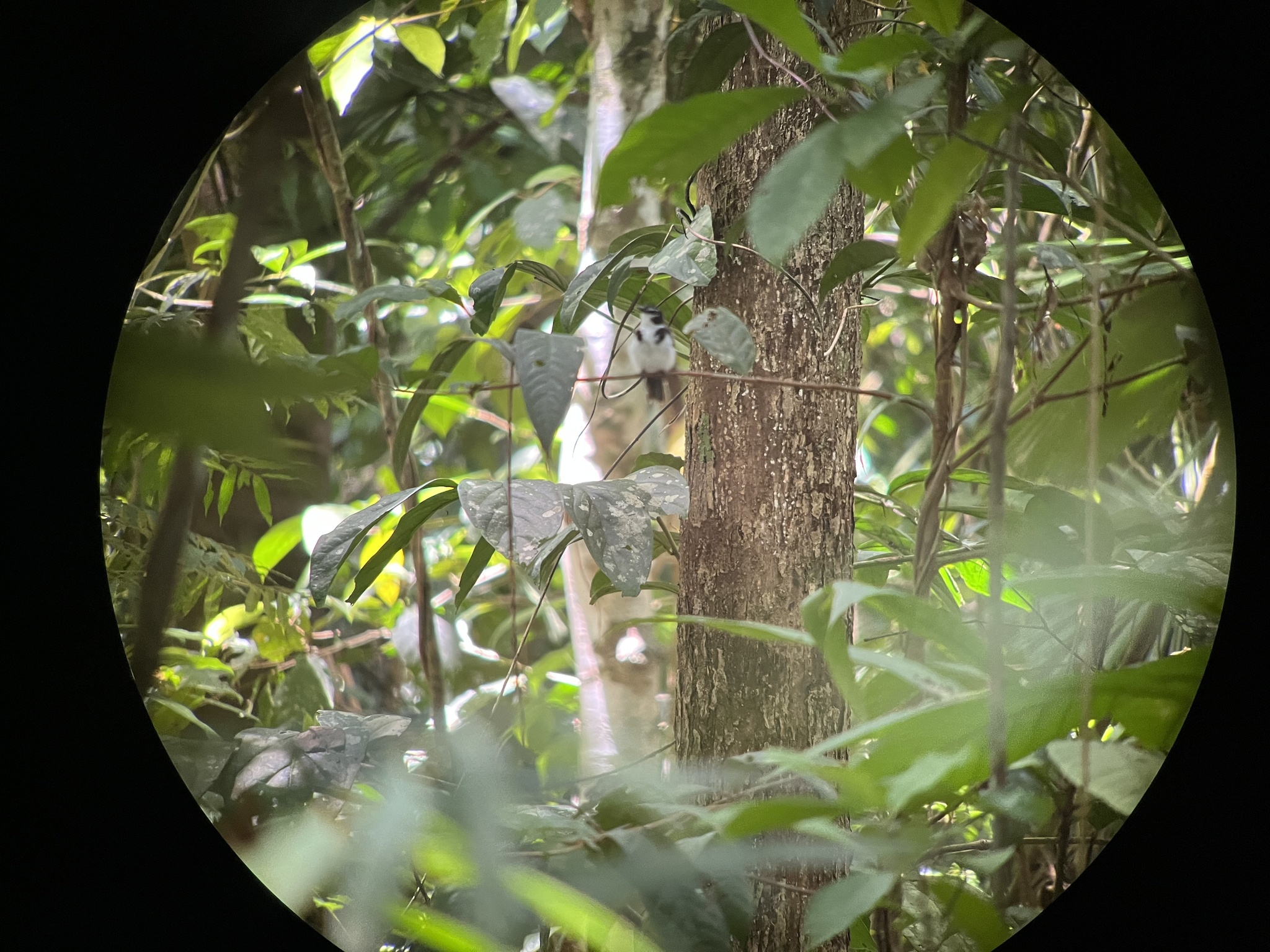
Live bird in tree

The black-sided robin (Poecilodryas hypoleuca), also known as the pied robin, is a species of bird in the family Petroicidae. It is widespread throughout New Guinea. Its natural habitat is subtropical or tropical moist lowland forests.

The genus name is derived from the Ancient Greek words poikilos 'pied' and dryas 'dryad', and the species name hypoleuca is derived from the Ancient Greek hypoleukos, meaning 'whitish'. Sibley and Ahlquist's DNA-DNA hybridisation studies placed this group in a Corvida parvorder comprising many tropical and Australian passerines including pardalotes, fairy-wrens, honeyeaters and crows. However, subsequent molecular research (and current consensus) places the robins as a very early offshoot of the Passerida (or "advanced" songbirds) within the songbird lineage.

Measuring 13 to 15 cm (5 to 6 in), the black-sided robin has black and white plumage. The upperparts including the crown, nape, back, wings and tail are black or brownish-black, as is its eye-stripe. It has white eyebrows, throat and underparts and a white patch on the wings. The bill is black, and the eyes are dark brown, and the legs grey or pink.

The black-sided robin is found across New Guinea from the Huon Peninsula west to the western limits of West Papua and West Papuan Islands, although is absent from the transfly region in the south. It inhabits predominantly lowland rainforests and swamp forests from sea level to 1,200 m (3,900 ft). Within the rainforest it is found singly or in pairs in the understory or on the ground. Shy, it is more often heard than seen. It is insectivorous, and hunts by gleaning and snatching insects from tree trunks and branches, and on the ground.
