= Sibley–Monroe checklist =

The Sibley–Monroe checklist is a list of bird species based on a study conducted by Charles Sibley and Burt Monroe. It drew on extensive DNA–DNA hybridization studies to reassess the relationships between modern birds. It was considered a landmark in ornithology on its release. The Sibley–Monroe assignment of individual species to families, and of families to orders remains controversial. Critics maintain that while it marks a leap forward so far as the evidence from DNA–DNA hybridization goes, it pays insufficient attention to other forms of evidence, both molecular and on a larger scale. There is no true consensus, but the broad middle-ground position is that the Sibley–Monroe classification, overall, is "about 80% correct". Research and debate concerning bird classification continue. There are 9994 species on the checklist.

== See also ==
- Sibley–Ahlquist taxonomy of birds
