= Passerae =

Former bird taxon

The "Passerae" were a proposed "parvclass" of birds in the Sibley–Ahlquist taxonomy. This taxon is a variation on the theme of "near passerines", birds that were – and often still are – believed to be close relatives of the passerines (perching birds, which include the songbirds). This proposed taxon was roundly rejected by subsequent cladistic analyses.

According to Sibley and Ahlquist, they include the following superorders and orders:

- Superorder Cuculimorphae
  - Order Cuculiformes
- Superorder Psittacimorphae
  - Order Psittaciformes
- Superorder Apodimorphae
  - Order Apodiformes
  - Order Trochiliformes
- Superorder Strigimorphae
  - Order Musophagiformes
  - Order Strigiformes
- Superorder Passerimorphae
  - Order Columbiformes
  - Order Gruiformes
  - Order Ciconiiformes
  - Order Passeriformes

Notable orders traditionally considered "near passerines" but not placed in the Passerae of the Sibley–Ahlquist taxonomy are Coliiformes, Coraciiformes, Piciformes and Trogoniformes (see below for why this is significant).

While the Sibley–Ahlquist taxonomy certainly represents a monumental endeavour and has some strong points (namely the recognition of the Galloanserae), basically everything about this "parvclass" is today regarded as utter fiction, brought about by the methodological and analytical problems of the phenetic DNA–DNA hybridization analysis. The "Passerae" are one of the most seriously flawed systematic proposals in modern ornithology, perhaps rivalled only by the suggestion (based as it was on early cladistic analyses) that Hesperornithes, Gaviiformes and Podicipediformes form a monophyletic group. In sheer scope of their falseness, however, the "Passerae" are in post-Linnean ornithology matched only by the ecomorphology-based "taxa" of Charles Lucien Jules Laurent Bonaparte's mid-19th century Conspectus Generum Avium.

== Refutation ==
Subsequent studies consider none of the orders contained in the "Passerae" particularly close to the passerines. And with the possible exception of the Columbiformes, about whose evolutionary history next to nothing is known as of 2007, all the "Passerimorphae" are universally considered to be about as far from the Passeriformes as a neoavian can possibly be. The all-encompassing "Ciconiiformes" are rejected by modern science, as is the grouping of owls and nightjars to the exclusion of swifts and hummingbirds, which moreover are not so distantly related to justify treatment as distinct orders. The close relationship of Musophagiformes and owls, while neither of the two groups is firmly placed in avian systematics, is also highly suspect.

At present, the closest living relatives of passerines are held to be the Piciformes, followed by the Coraciiformes. Neither of these two was included in the "Passerae". The Coliiformes and Trogoniformes, while of unclear relationships among the "higher landbirds", are also candidates for inclusion in a "near passerine" superorder. Insofar, it is actually hard to be less correct regarding the relationships of the perching birds than the Sibley–Ahlquist taxonomy.

Parvclasses are generally not used at all in modern ornithological systematics, as the understanding of neoavian relationship has not progressed to a point where use of such a taxonomic rank would seem sensible.
