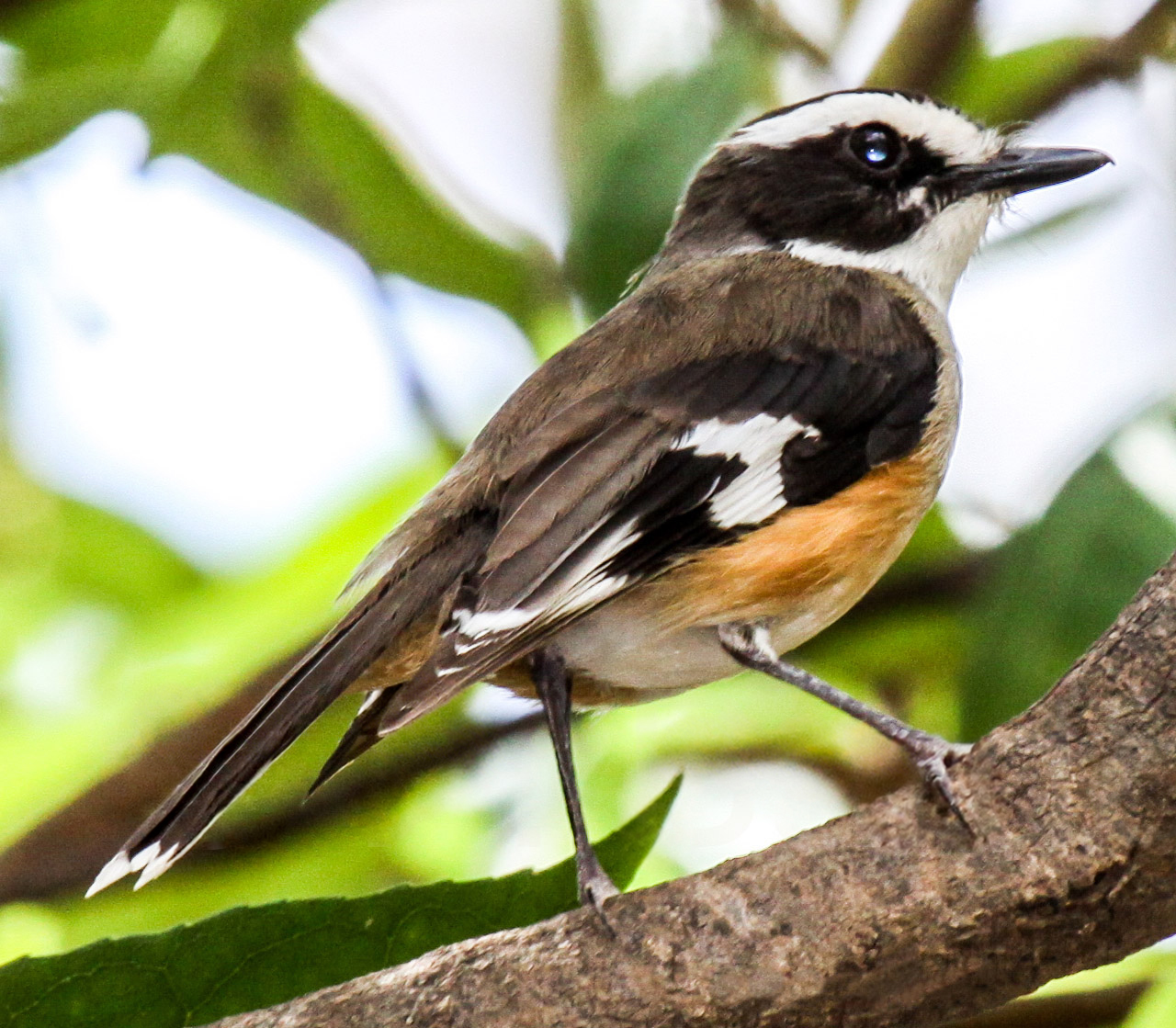
- in the Northern Territory

Conservation status
- Least Concern (IUCN 3.1)

Scientific classification
- Kingdom: Animalia
- Phylum: Chordata
- Class: Aves
- Order: Passeriformes
- Family: Petroicidae
- Genus: Poecilodryas
- Species: P. cerviniventris

Binomial name
- Poecilodryas cerviniventris (Gould, 1858)
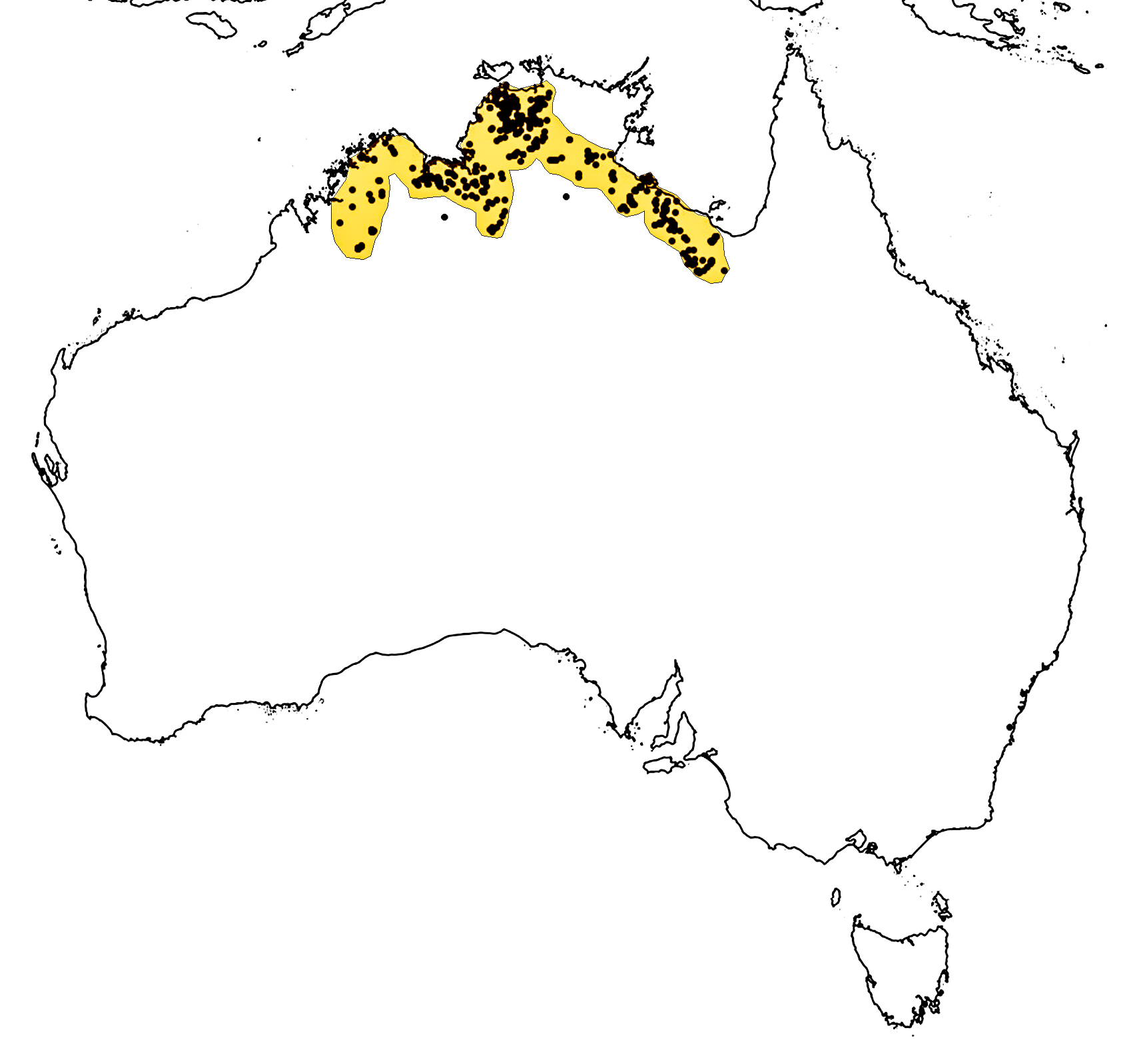
- Poecilodryas cerviniventris range

Synonyms
- Poecilodryas superciliosa cerviniventris; Petroica cerviniventris

= Buff-sided robin =

Species of bird

The buff-sided robin (Poecilodryas cerviniventris) is a small, diurnal, insectivorous, perching (passerine) bird in the family Petroicidae, a group commonly known as the Australo-Papuan or Australasian robins. It is also known as the buff-sided fly-robin, buff-sided shrike-robin, and Isabellflankenschnäpper (German). The buff-sided robin is endemic to northern Australia, where it primarily occurs in riparian forests and monsoon vine thickets from the Kimberly region of Western Australia to the north-west Queensland Gulf of Carpentaria. The plumage of the adult birds is characterized by a dark hood and back with a prominent white stripe on the supercilium; a white throat, white wing and tail bars, and a striking buff to orange patch on the flank below the wings. Adult birds are not sexually dimorphic; however, males are generally larger and can be separated from females based on morphological measurements. Buff-sided robins predominantly take insects from the ground by sallying from an observational perch. Insects are also occasionally taken by hawking on the wing or by gleaning from the trunk or foliage of riparian vegetation.

== Scientific discovery and early observations ==
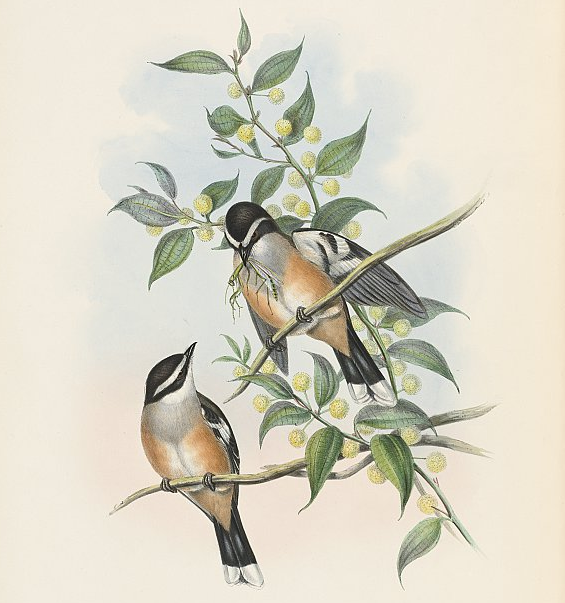
Gould's 1865 illustration of the buff-sided robin from his Birds of Australia Supplement.

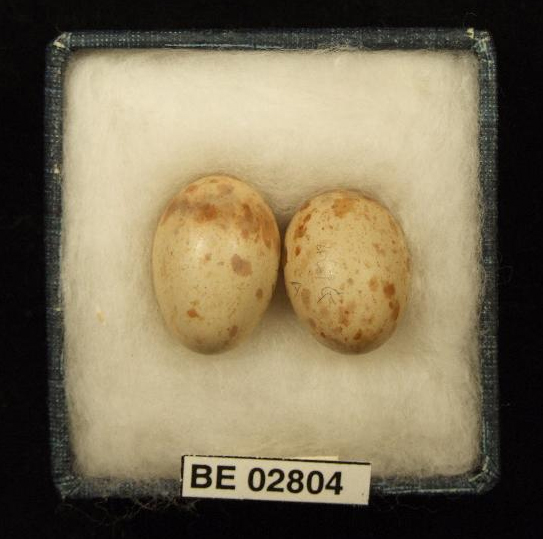
Buff-sided robin eggs collected by H.G. Barnard on the McArthur River Station, Northern Territory, 1913. Museum of Victoria H.L. White Collection.

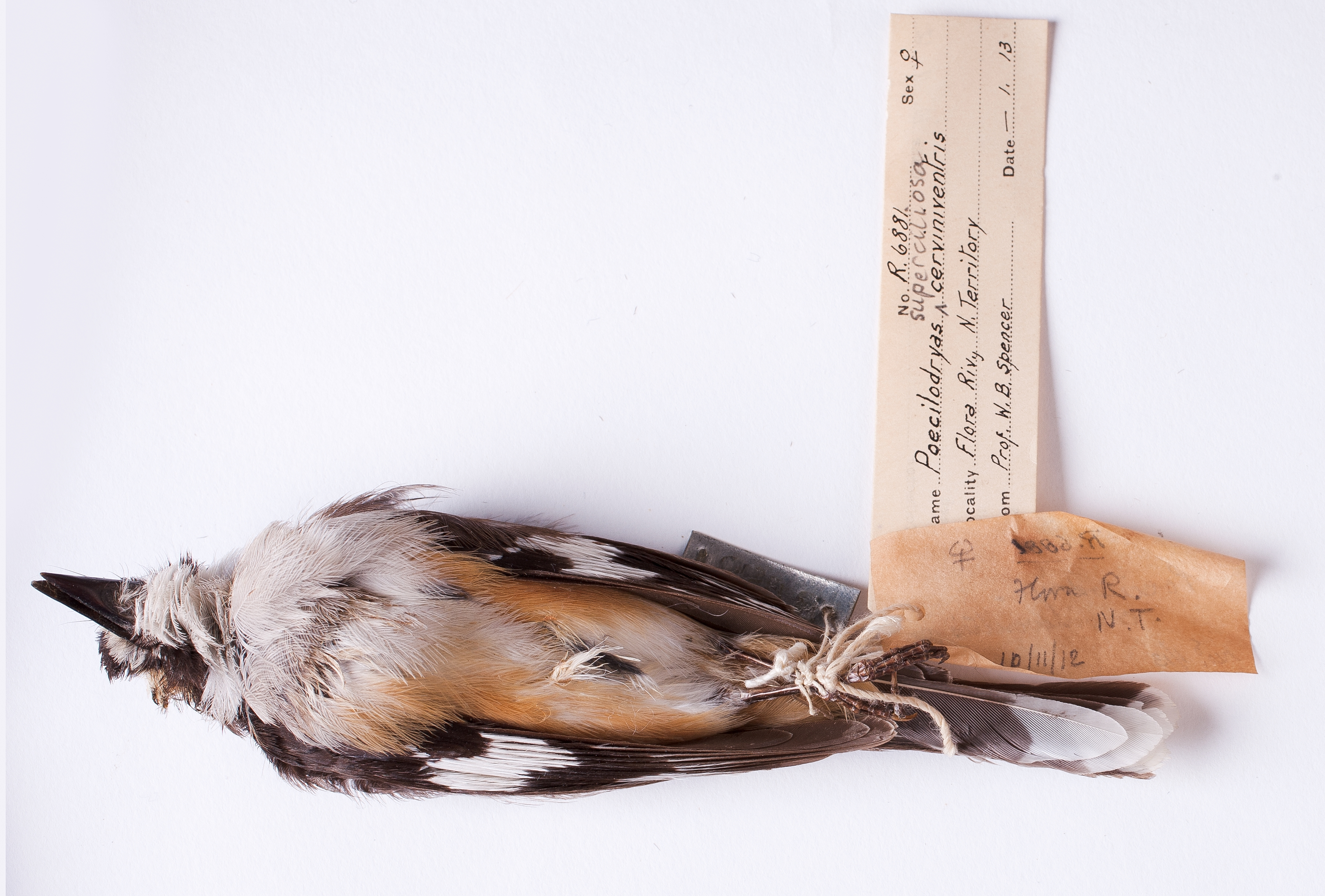
Early 19th century buff-sided robin specimen collected by W.B. Spencer at Flora River, Northern Territory, and held by the Museum of Victoria (H.L. White Collection)

The buff-sided robin was described as a unique species by the ornithologist and naturalist John Gould in 1857. This classification was based on specimens collected in 1856 by the naturalist and surgeon Joseph Ravenscroft Elsey. Elsey, residing at the Victoria River depot of the Augustus Charles Gregory 1855-1856 expedition (Northern Territory to Brisbane) between January and June 1856, collected a number of species unknown to science, including the buff-sided robin. The buff-sided robin type locality is situated on the Victoria River near of the present day township of Timber Creek. In a letter to Gould, dated June 1856, Elsey related a number of field observations of the buff-sided robin, including:

"Of Fly-catchers and Robins, so called, I have seven or eight species. One robin has a slate-grey back, black head and wings, and chestnut flanks, with a white stripe over the eye; it lives in the mangroves, and may be recognized at all times by its pretty little piping note. I found it nesting in November and again in February and March; the nest is an open, shallow, slightly constructed one; the eggs two in number, dull greenish-grey, speckled with brown mostly at the larger end".

Gould later paid tribute to the value of Elsey's Victoria River collections, stating in the text relating to the buff-sided robin in his 1865 Handbook to the Birds of Australia:

"So far as regards Ornithological science, it was fortunate that Mr. Elsey remained for a long time encamped near the Victoria River, on the north-west coast of Australia, since it enabled him to pay much attention to the natural objects which surrounded him; and the discovery of the present bird, which is quite new to science, is one of the results of his long stay in that spot in charge of a portion of Mr. Gregory's Expedition".

Buff-sided robins were subsequently collected at a number of sites across northern Australia by private collectors and naturalists attached to expeditions. Buff-sided robin specimens were collected on the Fitzroy River by T. H. Bowyer-Bower (Derby region, 1886), A.J. North (Calvert Expedition, 1896–1897), J.P. Rogers (1900) and F. L. Whitlock (1925). In the Northern Territory, collections were made on the Flora River by Walter Baldwin Spencer (1912), at the McArthur River by G.F. Hill (Barclay Expedition, 1911–1912), and in the same area by H.G. Barnard (1913-1914). The earliest Queensland specimens were collected on the Gregory River by W. McLennan in 1909.

== Taxonomy and systematics ==
The buff-sided robin was initially described under the binominal name Petroica cerviniventris (Family Petroicidae) by John Gould in 1857; however, placement in the genus Petroica was tentative. In a discussion relating to the buff-sided robin and closely allied white-browed robin, Gould subsequently observed that "...as both differ somewhat in form from the typical members of the genus, or true Petroica, it may in all probability be found necessary to institute a distinct genus for their reception". The buff-sided robin was later assigned to the genus Poecilodryas, a grouping that includes seven species from the Australian mainland, New Guinea, and the eastern Indonesian Islands of Misool, Salawai and Waigeo.

Gould recognised the similarity between the buff-sided robin and the closely allied white-browed robin (Poecilodryas superciliosa), a species discovered by John Gilbert in the Burdekin region of Queensland in 1845. Gould stated that the buff-sided and white-browed robin were "...doubtless representatives of each other in the respective countries they inhabit...". Between 1958 and 1994, a number of authors considered P. superciliosa (NE Australia) and P. cerviniventris (NW Australia) to be a single species as a result of these similarities.

Schodde and Mason reinstated Gould's original taxa P. superciliosa and P. cerviniventris as separate species on the basis of a comparison of all members of the superciliosa super-species, including the New Guinean black-sided robin (Poecilodryas hypoleuca). They found that P. cerviniventris showed distinct morphological and plumage variation when compared to P. superciliosa, including larger size, rich tawny-rufous flanks, white tipping on all rectrices, and duskier grey-brown upper dorsum. Schodde and Mason also note that there is no evidence of recent genetic flow between the two taxa across the Gulf of Carpentaria, and morphological differences are most extreme for populations that are closest in terms of distribution.

Subsequent genetic analysis indicates that while they are closely related, the two taxa display a degree of genetic divergence that is consistent with their recognition as separate species. Loynes et al. found that Poecilodryas is monophyletic and located within a clade, including Drymodes, Eopsaltria (excluding E. flaviventris), Tregellasia, Peneothello, Melanodryas, and Poecilodryas. All taxa within the clade (except Drymodes) are united in a strongly supported, monophyletic subfamily (Eopsaltriinae). Within the genus Poecilodryas, the Australian species P. cerviniventris and P. superciliosa are strongly supported as sister taxa, with Poecilodryas albispecularis as sister to this pair. Genetic similarity between P. superciliosa and P. cerviniventris is consistent with allopatric speciation as a result of geographic isolation of the two taxa on either side of the lower Gulf of Carpentaria.

The binominal name translates as stag-bellied dappled tree-nymph. The generic name Poecilodryas (from the Ancient Greek for 'spotted or dappled wood-nymph') refers to the spots on the wing and tail of species in this genus, and to its characteristic flight and perching behaviour. The specific epithet cerviniventris refers to the buff colouration of the chest, derived from Latin cervus = 'stag, deer' and ventris 'vent, belly'.

== Description ==
The buff-sided robin is a medium- to large-sized robin species, with body length ranging from 16 to 18 cm (6.3 to 7.1 in). Adult buff-sided robins are not sexually dimorphic, and the sexes cannot be differentiated on the basis of plumage. However, males are generally larger than females with very little overlap for weight, head length, bill length, tarsus and wing cord length; and sexing criteria can be developed on the basis of combined morphological measurements.

Based on data from museum specimen labels, adult wingspans range from 84 to 93 mm (3.3 to 3.7 in) (n=22) in male birds to 77 to 85 mm (3.0 to 3.3 in) in female birds (n=17). Adult male buff-sided robins weigh between 20.0 to 25.5 g (0.71 to 0.90 oz) (n=13), and females weigh between 15.5 to 20.3 g (0.55 to 0.72 oz) (n=10). Adult tarsus length ranges from 20.4 to 24.0 mm (0.80 to 0.94 in) (n=22) in male birds to 18.6 to 20.7 mm (0.73 to 0.81 in) in female birds (n=17).

=== Adult plumage ===
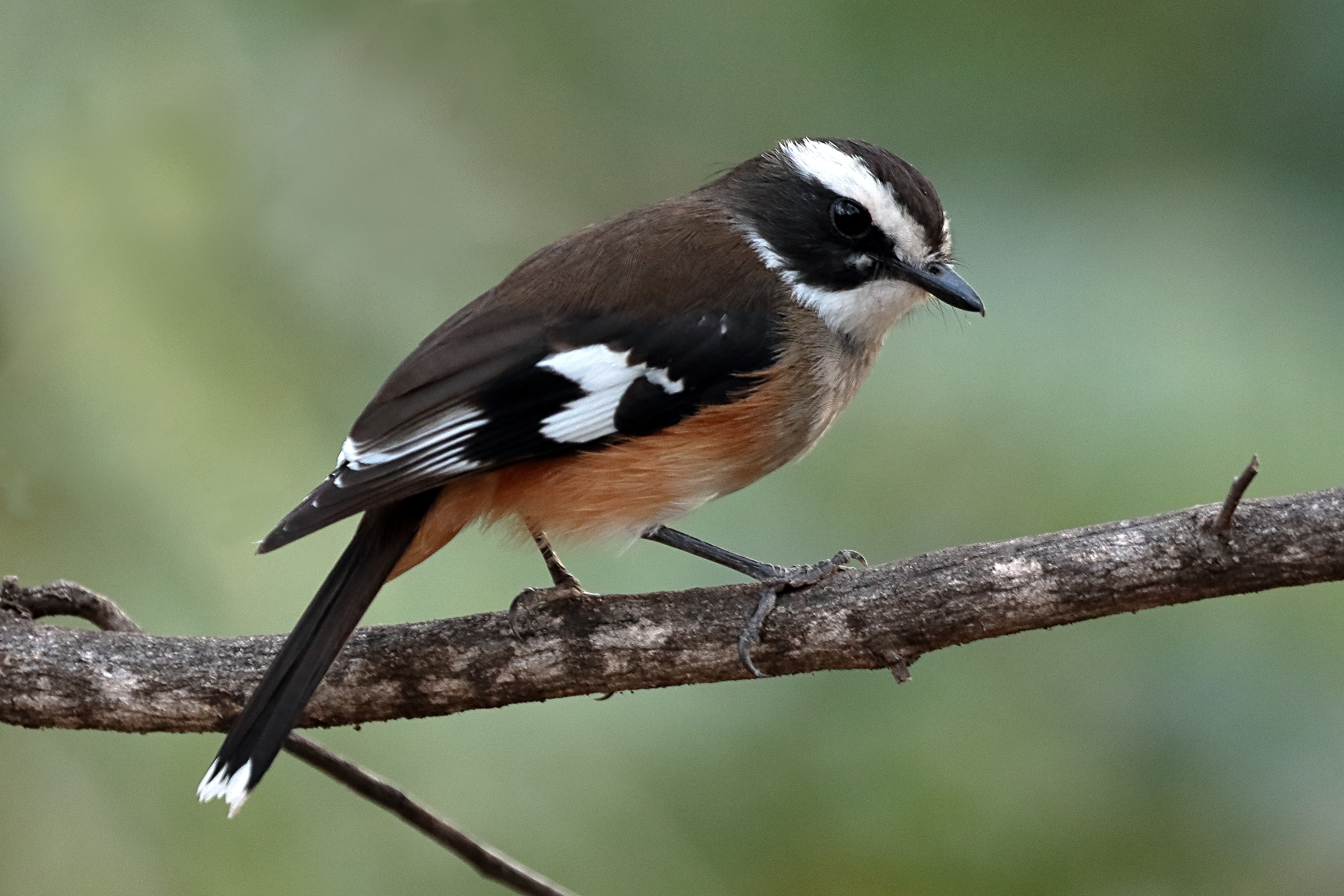
Adult buff-sided robin, Lawn Hill QLD.

The head and neck of adult birds is characterised by a dark hood with a prominent white stripe on the supercilium, the lores and auriculars are black, the malar region white, the throat white and rictal bristles are prominent. The mantle and nape are dark olive-brown to black, the chest has a strong grey wash, and the flanks and sides are deep fawn, becoming almost white on the belly. The base colour of the wings is dark brown to black, while the extremities of the greater wing-coverts, base of the primaries, base and extremities of the secondaries, and extremities of the tail are white. The bill is black, and the legs and feet are grey to blackish-brown or brown to black. The iris is dark brown. Distinguished from the similar white-browed robin by its larger size, thicker and longer white superciliary stripe, duskier upper back, broad black face band, grey chest, broader white remigial bar, rich tawny to rufous flanks, and white tipping on all rectrices.

=== Juvenile and immature plumage ===
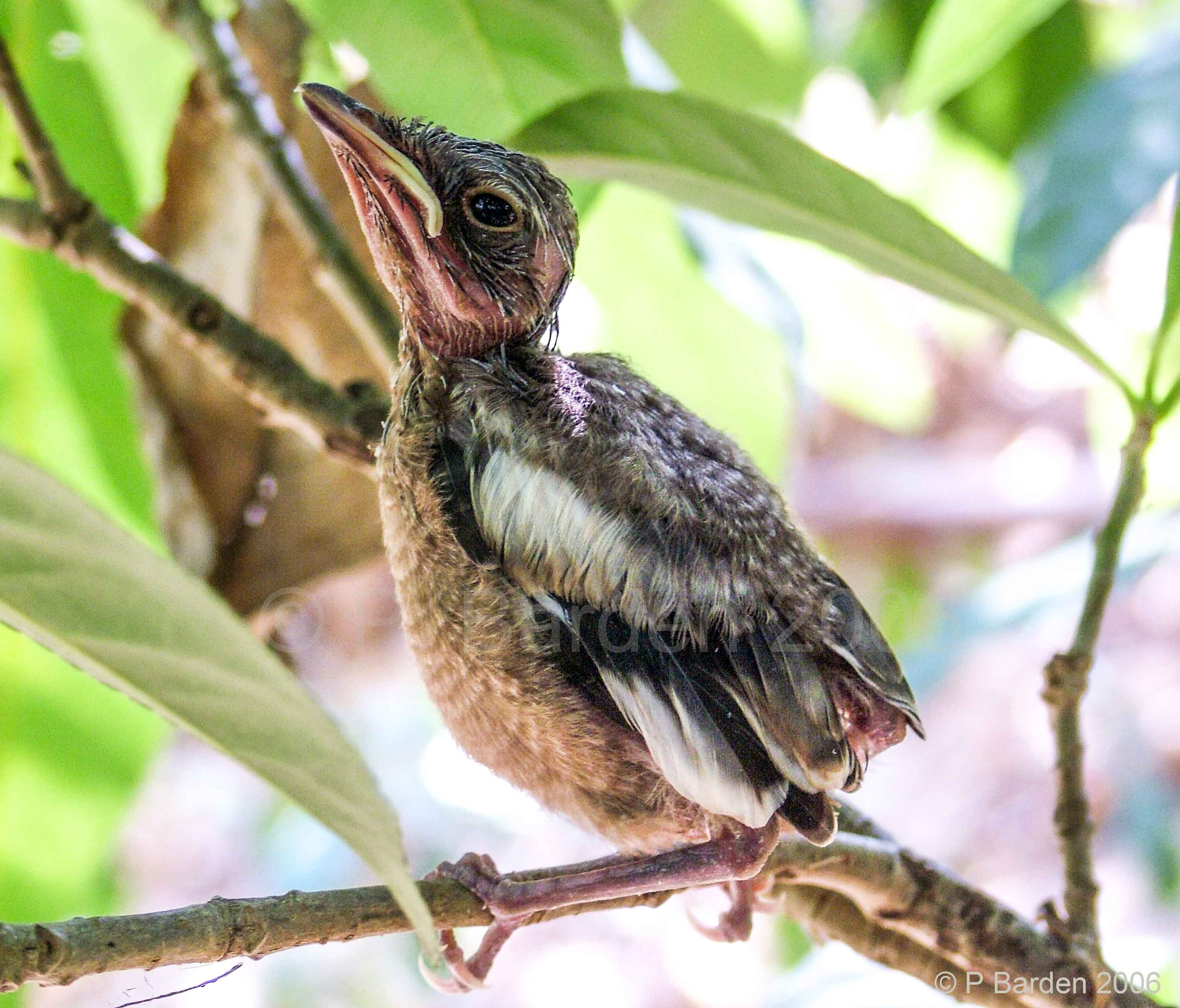
Juvenile plumage

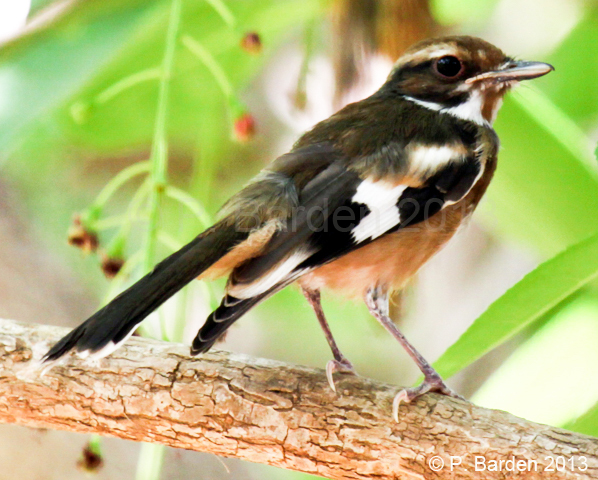
First immature plumage

In juvenile plumage, the head, neck and upper body are rusty brown with faint barring of light cream, the back is dark brown, upper wing-coverts white with buff tips, with a narrow white bar on the bend of the wing, white tipping on the rectrices and tail, similar to adult but paler. First immature plumage resembles adults, but individuals retain a dark buff colouration on the throat, lores, forehead and crown, mixed grey and rusty brown on the chest, light buff on the flanks and belly, with white feathers emerging on the supercilium and malar region.

== Distribution and habitat ==
The buff-sided robin occurs in suitable habitat within northern coastal drainage basins from the Kimberley region of north-west Western Australia, the Top End of the Northern Territory to the north-western Gulf of Carpentaria in Queensland. In Western Australia, the buff-sided robin occurs within the Central Kimberley, Northern Kimberley and Ord Victoria Plain IBRA Bioregions with scattered records from King Edward River, Prince Regent River, Wunaamin Miliwundi Ranges, Drysdale River/Kalumburu, Mitchell River, Mitchell Plateau, Fitzroy River, Geikie Gorge, Pentecost River, Wyndham and Kununurra. In the Northern Territory, the buff-sided robin occurs within the Victoria Bonaparte, Darwin Coastal, Arnhem Coast, Pine Creek, Daly Basin, Gulf Coastal, and Gulf Fall and Uplands IBRA Bioregions. In the western Northern Territory, the range of the buff-sided robin extends from the Western Australian border to Kakadu National Park within the Keep River, Victoria River, Fitzmaurice River, Moyle River, Daly River, Darwin River, Finniss River, Adelaide River, Mary River, Wildman River, West Alligator River and East Alligator River catchments. It is absent from eastern Arnhem Land, but occurs in eastern Northern Territory within the Roper River, Limmen Bight River, McArthur River, Robinson River, Calvert River and Settlement Creek drainage basins. In north-west Queensland, the buff-sided robin occurs in the Gulf Plains IBRA Bioregion, with all known records located within the Settlement Creek and Nicholson River drainage basins. Within these catchments, populations are known from the Gregory River, Nicholson River, Boodjamulla (Lawn Hill) National Park and Lagoon Creek (Westmoreland Gorge).

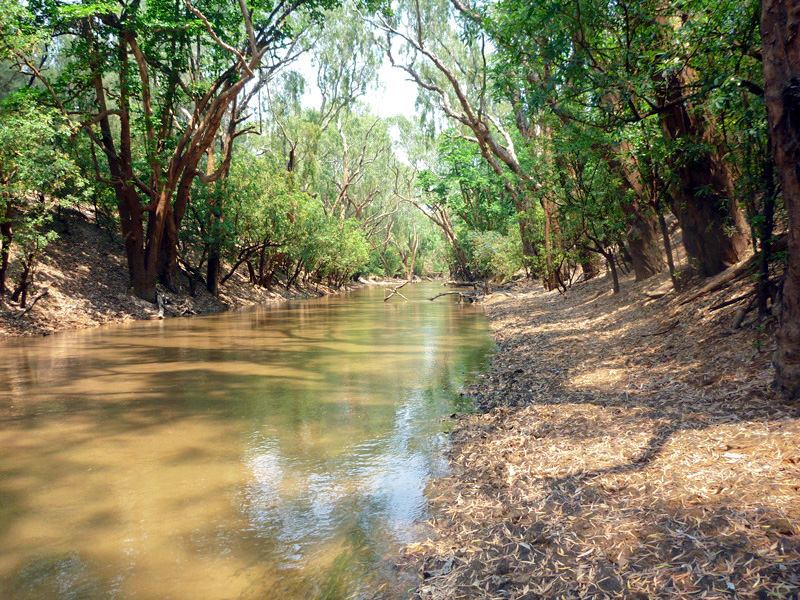
Typical riparian habitat of the buff-sided robin with fringing Melaleuca leucadendra, Nauclea orientalis and Barringtonia acutangula. Eastern Northern Territory

The buff-sided robin is largely confined to dense riparian vegetation, and subcoastal and sandstone monsoon vine-thickets. At riparian sites, it prefers thickets of freshwater mangrove, pandanus, and bamboo. The core riparian forest habitat of the buff-sided robin is characterised by canopy and sub-canopy trees, including Melaleuca leucadendra, Nauclea orientalis, Ficus, Terminalia, Pandanus aquaticus, and Barringtonia acutangula. Buff-sided robins are strongly associated with these dense, closed canopy, vegetation communities, rarely venturing into adjacent drier and more open forest types. Buff-sided robins have been reported occasionally from tidally influenced mangrove communities near the coast.

Observations of the habitat of the buff-sided robin were provided by Elsey, who described it as living in "mangroves" on the Victoria River, a reference to the freshwater mangrove (Barringtonia acutangula) that occurs on the lower banks of freshwater reaches of rivers in the region. Whitlock confirmed Elsey's habitat observations on the Victoria River, reporting that the buff-sided robin was "...one of the most attractive inhabitants of the river forests, to which it seemed to be almost exclusively confined", and that it "...favoured thickets of freshwater mangroves". Hill described the buff-sided robin on the McArthur River (Gulf of Carpentaria) as being "Found in thick scrub and timber in sheltered localities, generally near water". Barnard described it as "...common along the water-courses and in the brush growing at the foot of the sandstone bluffs" in the McArthur River catchment, the latter comment referring to dry monsoon vine-thickets associated with sandstone escarpments. At the eastern extremity of its range on the Gregory River (north-western Queensland), the buff-sided robin was reported by McClennan to occur in riverine habitat and "...when disturbed makes for the pandanus growing along the river-banks, where it is usually to be found at other times, and in which it doubtless nests."

== Behaviour and ecology ==
=== Foraging and diet ===
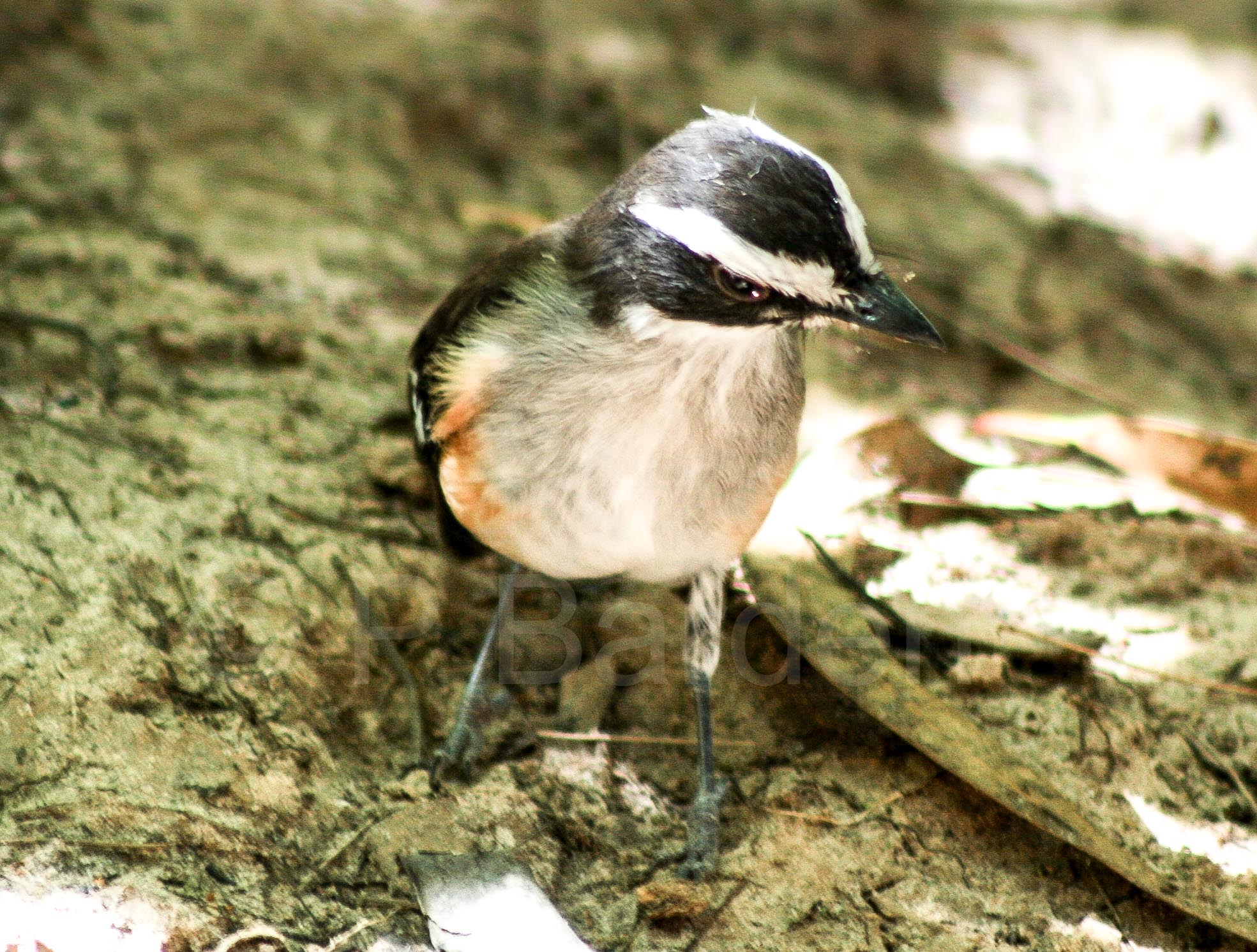
Buff-sided robin hunting for insects in leaf litter, eastern Northern Territory

The buff-sided robin is a diurnal insectivore, predominantly hunting by sallying from a perch onto a hard substrate (usually the ground) remote from the bird—a predatory method that relies on observation, direct flight towards prey, followed by capture. An observational study suggested that 95% of successful foraging actions by the buff-sided robin are sally strikes onto a surface, and the remaining 5% are by hawking (aerial capture of a flying insect). A small percentage of prey is taken from other surfaces, including the trunks, branches, and foliage of vegetation. Most hunting is undertaken close to the ground, with 85% of foraging observations being within 0 to 3 m (0.0 to 9.8 ft) from the ground surface.

Detailed studies of the diet have not been undertaken; however, prey items are known to include a range of decapods, spiders, and insects, including beetles (Coleoptera), ants (Formicidae), and larval moths and butterflies (Lepidoptera).

=== Reproduction ===
Breeding occurs throughout the range of the buff-sided robin, with most breeding and nesting activity occurring across the warmer months and wet season between October and March, with occasional dry season nesting records. Clutch size is generally two and eggs range in size from 17.8 to 20.3 mm (0.70 to 0.80 in) in length. The eggs vary considerably in terms of colouration, with a ground colour of light green to dark olive-green and with reddish brown, chestnut or purplish-buff markings. Time between hatching and fledging of young is unknown. Buff-sided robin nests are occasionally targeted by interspecific, avian brood parasites (cuckoos). J.P. Rogers observed buff-sided robin adults feeding an immature cuckoo, presumed to be a black-eared cuckoo (Chalcites osculans), on the Fitzroy River.

Buff-sided robin nests are located close to water in dense vegetation, and are established on a horizontal or vertical fork of a tree or shrub, commonly at a height of 1 to 3 m (3.3 to 9.8 ft), and occasionally at greater heights. Nests range in size from 7.3 to 10.2 cm (2.9 to 4.0 in) (external width) and 2.8 to 5.6 cm (1.1 to 2.2 in) (internal depth). Nests are loosely constructed from twigs, shreds of bark (Melaleuca), vines, roots, and grass, bound with cobwebs, and sometimes lined with material, such as grass, rootlets, and feathers.

=== Vocalisations ===
Buff-sided robin:ker-chu calls, Lawn Hill Station QLD

Buff-sided robin: staccato and piping calls, Nicholson R QLD

Both sexes produce similar calls, described as clear, sweet notes. Buff-sided robins call infrequently and are vocal in the early morning and late afternoon, with common calls including repeated sequences of two to three short, loud, clear whistling notes (the last note at a higher pitch), or a repeated series of three to five variably pitched, loud whistles. Buff-sided robins produce a chatter call when interacting with other individuals or young, or when attempting to entice a fledgling from the nest.

=== Territoriality, movements and longevity ===
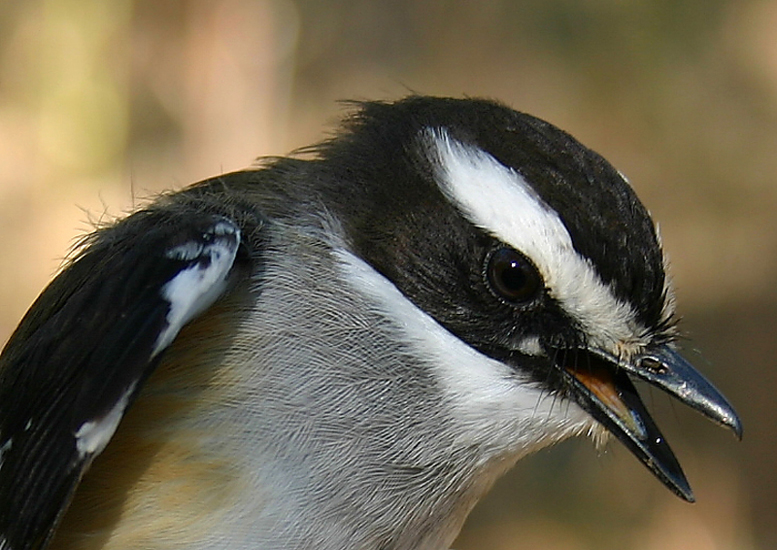
Edgar: longest lived and least adventurous buff-sided robin

Territoriality in buff-sided robins is poorly understood, but males and male/female pairs maintain discrete territories, with MacGillivray (1914) noting that "...each pair seems to have its own locality." Banding studies indicate that males can occupy a site or territory over many years and adults are typically resident or sedentary. Banding studies have recorded an average movement distance of 1 km (0.62 mi) between capture and recovery and a maximum distance of 3 km (1.9 mi). The longest recorded movement is a buff-sided robin banded on the McArthur River and re-sighted 3 km (1.9 mi) from the original capture location in similar riparian habitat. Buff-sided robins are occasionally observed in isolated patches of closed forest, such as monsoon vine forests, that are separated from riparian corridors and other suitable habitat.

Based on banding data, the average time elapsed between capture and recovery is one year and six months, and the maximum time elapsed exceeds 8 years. The longest lived buff-sided robin is a male known as "Edgar", banded on the McArthur River (NT) in August 2007, and last re-sighted on 1 November 2016 (9 years 3 months).

== Status and conservation ==
=== IUCN assessment and legislative status ===
The buff-sided robin is listed as least concern by the IUCN (2012.1), and is listed as near threatened in the Northern Territory.

=== Population status and threats ===
The buff-sided robin occurs over a very large range and while the population trend is declining, the decrease is not believed to be sufficiently rapid to meet the threshold for listing as vulnerable under IUCN population trend criterion (>30% decline over ten years or three generations). The suspected declining trend has been attributed to the destruction and degradation of the riparian habitat of the buff-sided robin by cattle and feral animals. The population size has not been determined; however, it is also not considered to approach thresholds for listing as vulnerable under IUCN population size criterion.

Potential threats to populations of the buff-sided robin are related to the direct and indirect actions of humans (Homo sapiens), including atmospheric pollution leading to climate change, altered fire regimes, pastoralism (exotic ruminants), introduction of feral animals, removal of apex predators (dingo control), land clearing, agricultural and water resource development, and weed invasion.

==== Pastoralism, feral animals and fire ====
The main habitats of the buff-sided robin, including riparian and monsoon vine forests, have suffered deterioration and decline, due to the combined impacts of introduced grazing animals (cattle, water buffalo), feral pigs and altered fire regimes, with patches being damaged, fragmented and reduced in area by a combination of these factors. Monsoon vine forests have been particularly impacted by contemporary and recent fire regimes, driven by altered pastoral management, cultural management and other land use changes, with significant reductions in area as open forests advance. This retreat of monsoon vine forest is negatively impacting bird species that rely on these habitats, including the buff-sided robin. Land clearing has typically had less of an impact on habitats in northern Australian monsoonal savanna ecosystems; however, land clearing is increasingly a component of pastoral intensification and agriculture projects, for example, in the Kimberley (Ord River), Northern Territory (Daly River), and north-west Queensland.

==== Feral cats and dingo control ====
Feral cats occur throughout the range of the buff-sided robin, and birds that forage and nest close to the ground are an important dietary component of this exotic predator, indicating that cats may present a significant threat to buff-sided robin populations. Small to medium-sized birds are the third most commonly consumed food group for feral cats in Australia.

Widespread control of dingoes by baiting and shooting occurs as a component of standard land management for the pastoral industry (cattle) across most of the distribution of the buff-sided robin in the Australian monsoonal tropics, and this may exacerbate the impacts of feral cats on wildlife. Removal of apex predators (dingo) has been shown to increase the numbers and/or hunting activity of mid-level or meso-predators (feral cats), potentially increasing impacts on prey species, including small to medium-sized birds.

==== Anthropogenic climate change ====
In combination with other factors, including ongoing degradation of habitat from pastoralism and altered fire regimes, global climate change or global warming presents a serious and increasing threat to birds and other fauna. The buff-sided robin (=white-browed robin) was rated as being in the top ten savanna birds most vulnerable to climate change impacts, in a study investigating the vulnerability of Australian tropical savanna birds to climate change. The study utilised an index of climate change vulnerability based on sensitivity (reproductive rate, relative abundance), adaptive capacity (diet specialisation, dispersal ability), and potential exposure to climate change (change in distribution of suitable climate space for each species under various climate models). Factors that increase the vulnerability of the buff-sided robin to climate change impacts include diet and foraging type (aerial sallying and hawking insectivore), habitat (species that rely on spatially restricted riparian and monsoon vine forest habitats), biogeography (species with limited ranging behaviour), and extreme weather (species that occur in regions where there is an increasing risk of extreme temperature events or changes in rainfall patterns).

=== Conservation reserves ===
The buff-sided robin has been recorded in a range of conservation reserves. In Western Australia, it occurs in Geikie Gorge National Park (WA), Prince Regent National Park (WA), and Parrys Lagoons Nature Refuge (WA). In the Northern Territory, it occurs in Keep River National Park (NT), Judbarra/Gregory National Park (NT), Giwining/Flora River Nature Park (NT), Tjuwaliyn Hot Springs Nature Park (NT), Litchfield National Park (NT), Djukbinj National Park (NT), Charles Darwin National Park (NT), Harrison Dam Conservation Area (NT), Mary River National Park (NT), Nitmiluk National Park (NT), Kakadu National Park (NT), Elsey National Park (NT), Limmen National Park (NT), Barranyi (North Island) National Park (NT), and Caranbirini Conservation Reserve (NT). In Queensland, it occurs in Boodjamulla (Lawn Hill) National Park.

== Gallery ==
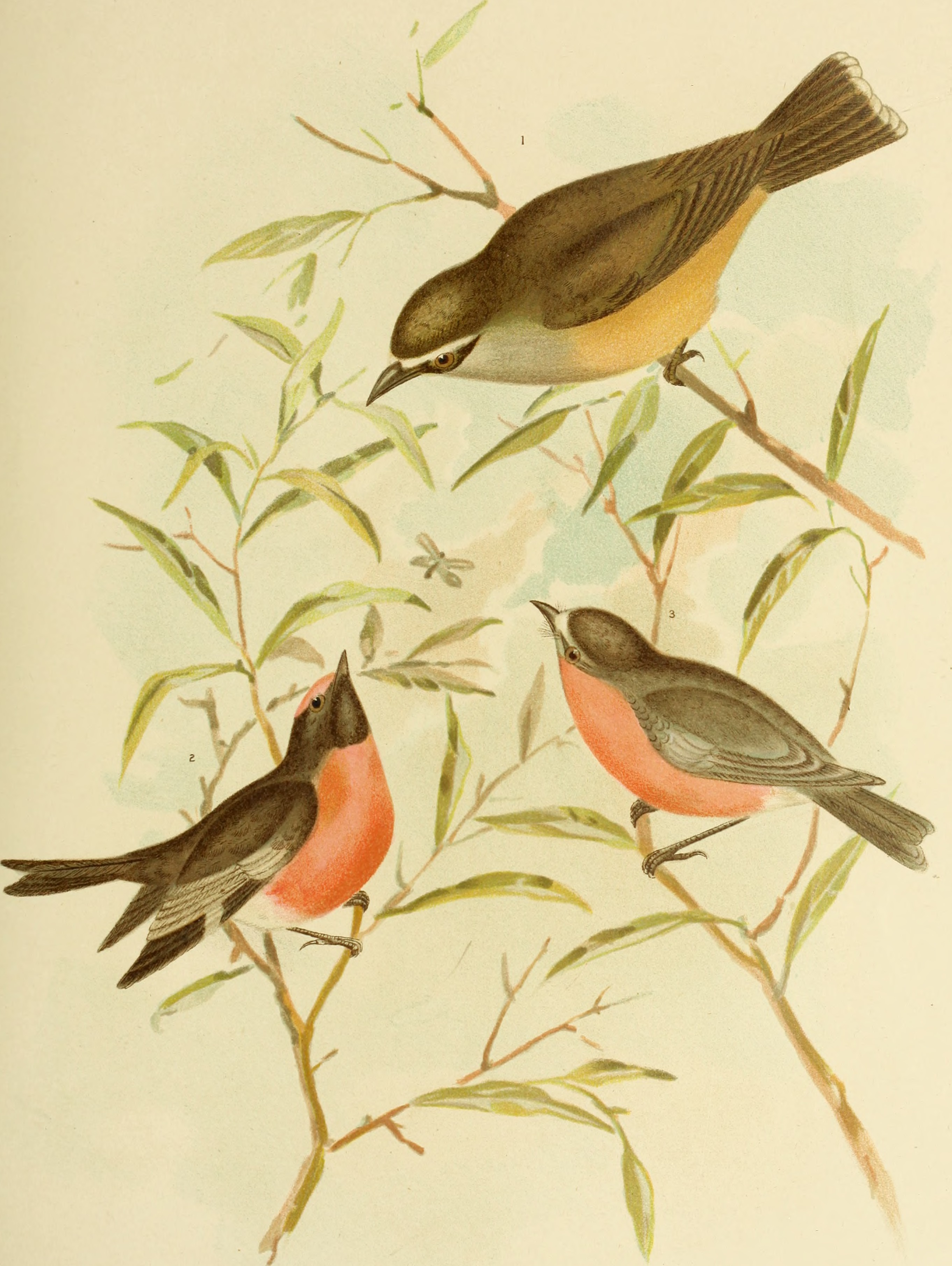
Buff-sided robin (Poecilodryas cerviniventris) illustration from Gould's Birds of Australia (1890)

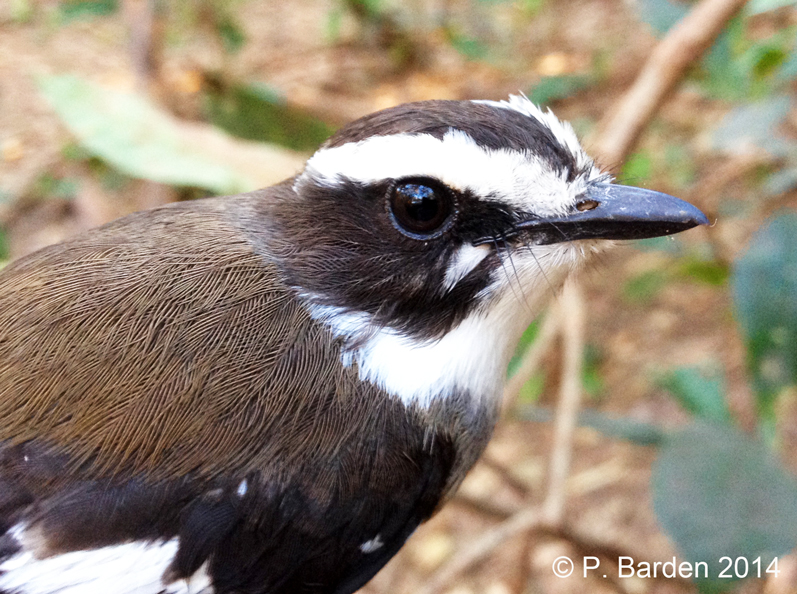
Buff-sided robin: detail of the head, eastern Northern Territory

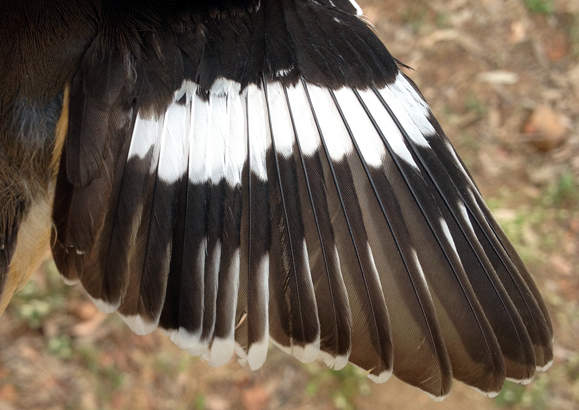
Buff-sided robin: detail of the wing, eastern Northern Territory
