= Burt Monroe =

American ornithologist

Burt Leavelle Monroe Jr. (25 August 1930 – 14 May 1994, in Louisville, Kentucky) was an American ornithologist, a professor at the University of Louisville, a member of the American Ornithologists' Union (AOU) beginning in 1953. Among his major contributions to avian taxonomy was the work with Charles Sibley resulting in the so-called Sibley-Monroe classification.

== Biography ==
Monroe was born in Louisville to Ethelmae Tuell and Burt Leavelle Monroe Sr. (1901–1968). Like his father, he too took an interest in birds as well as a wider interest in natural history and published his first note on short-eared owls in 1945. He obtained a bachelor's degree in biology at the University of Louisville and then joined the US Navy from 1953 to 1959 rising to become a Lieutenant and working as a flight instructor at Pensacola. He then joined the Louisiana State University and worked on expeditions to collect birds in Honduras. This led also to his doctoral dissertation on the birds of Honduras (1965) under George Lowery. He married fellow student Rose Sawyer. In 1965 he became assistant professor of biology at the University of Louisville and headed the department from 1970. After seeing his father die from a heart attack during an audit of the AOU, he took up in 1968 the role of treasurer. He became part of the Checklist Committee in 1977. In 1983 he worked with Charles Sibley on DNA-DNA hybridization to work out the classification of birds resulting in the landmark publication Distribution and Taxonomy of Birds of the World (1990). He published A World Checklist of Bird in 1993. His last book The Birds of Kentucky was published posthumously in 1994. He died from cancer.
