= Sibley–Ahlquist taxonomy of birds =

Proposed classification system of birds

The Sibley–Ahlquist taxonomy is a bird taxonomy proposed by Charles Sibley and Jon E. Ahlquist. It is based on DNA–DNA hybridization studies conducted in the late 1970s and throughout the 1980s. DNA–DNA hybridization is among a class of comparative techniques in molecular biology that produce distance data (versus character data) and that can be analyzed to produce phylogenetic reconstructions only using phenetic tree-building algorithms. In DNA–DNA hybridization, the percent similarity of DNA between two species is estimated by the reduction in hydrogen bonding between nucleotides of imperfectly matched heteroduplex DNA (i.e., double stranded DNAs that are experimentally produced from single strands of two different species), compared with perfectly matched homoduplex DNA (both strands of DNA from the same species).

== Characteristics ==
The classification appears to be an early example of cladistic classification because it codifies many intermediate levels of taxa: the "trunk" of the family tree is the class Aves, which branches into subclasses, which branch into infraclasses, and then "parvclasses", superorders, orders, suborders, infraorders, "parvorders", superfamilies, families, subfamilies, tribes, subtribes and finally genera and species. However the classification study did not employ modern cladistic methods, as it relies strictly on DNA-DNA hybridization as the sole measure of similarity.

The Sibley–Ahlquist arrangement differs greatly from the more traditional approach used in the Clements taxonomy.

- Neornithes
  - Neoaves
    - Other birds
    - Galloanserae
      - Anseriformes
      - - Galliformes
        - Craciformes

Basal divergences of modern birds
in the Sibley–Ahlquist taxonomy

Showing major changes from Clements, the Sibley–Ahlquist orders are as follows:

- Enlarged Struthioniformes replaces the ratite orders Rheiformes (rheas), Casuariiformes (cassowaries and emus), and Apterygiformes (kiwis) and Struthioniformes (ostriches).
- Tinamiformes (tinamous) is unchanged.
- A greatly enlarged Ciconiiformes includes the previous Sphenisciformes (penguins), Gaviiformes (divers), Podicipediformes (grebes), Procellariiformes (tubenoses), Pelecaniformes (pelicans and allies), Ciconiiformes (storks and allies), Falconiformes (birds of prey), Charadriiformes (waders, gulls, terns, and auks), and the family Pteroclidae (sandgrouse).
- Anseriformes (ducks and allies) is unchanged.
- Modified Galliformes landfowl. Chachalacas moved to Craciformes.
- New Craciformes chachalacas etc. Previously part of Galliformes.
- Modified Gruiformes Cranes. Button-quails moved to Turniciformes.
- New Turniciformes button-quails etc. Previously part of Gruiformes.
- Modified Columbiformes doves. Sandgrouse moved to Ciconiiformes.
- Psittaciformes cockatoos and parrots unchanged.
- New Musophagiformes turacos. Previously part of Cuculiformes.
- Modified Cuculiformes cuckoos. Turacos moved to Musophagiformes.
- Modified Strigiformes owls. Enlarged to include Caprimulgiformes (nightjars, owlet-nightjars, frogmouths, oilbirds, potoos).
- Modified Apodiformes swifts. Hummingbirds moved to Trochiliformes.
- New Trochiliformes hummingbirds. Previously part of Apodiformes.
- Coliiformes mousebirds unchanged.
- Trogoniformes trogons unchanged.
- Modified Coraciiformes rollers.
- New Upupiformes Hoopoe. Previously part of Coraciiformes.
- New Bucerotiformes hornbills. Previously part of Coraciiformes.
- New Galbuliformes jacamars and puffbirds. Previously part of Piciformes.
- Modified Piciformes woodpeckers
- Passeriformes perching birds unchanged.

Some of these changes are minor adjustments. For instance, instead of putting the swifts, treeswifts, and hummingbirds in the same order that includes nothing else, Sibley and Ahlquist put them in the same superorder that includes nothing else, consisting of one order for the hummingbirds and another for the swifts and treeswifts. In other words, they still regard the swifts as the hummingbirds' closest relatives.

Other changes are much more drastic. The penguins were traditionally regarded as distant from all other living birds. For instance, Wetmore put them in a superorder by themselves, with all other non-ratite birds in a different superorder. Sibley and Ahlquist, though, put penguins in the same superfamily as divers (loons), tubenoses, and frigatebirds. According to their phylogenetic analysis, penguins are closer to those birds than herons are to storks.

The Galloanserae (waterfowl and landfowl) has found widespread acceptance. The DNA evidence of Sibley–Ahlquist for the monophyly of the group is supported by the discovery of the fossil bird Vegavis iaai, an essentially modern but most peculiar waterfowl that lived near Cape Horn some 66–68 million years ago, still in the age of the dinosaurs.

== Classification ==
Parvclass	Superorder	Order	Families	Note on current status
Infraclass Eoaves				Infraclass is now called Palaeognathae. Parvclass Ratitae is no longer used, and is generally understood to refer to a taxon without tinamous or lithornithids, which is now recognised as polyphyletic.
Ratitae		Struthioniformes	1. Struthionidae; 2. Rheidae; 3. Casuariidae; 4. Apterygidae	Struthioniformes found to be polyphyletic: Rheidae now in Rheiformes; Casuariidae now in Casuariiformes; Apterygidae now in Apterygiformes
Ratitae		Tinamiformes	1. Tinamidae	
Infraclass Neoaves				Infraclass is now called Neognathae. Neoaves now refers to a clade containing all neognaths except for Pangalloanserae.
Galloanserae	Gallomorphae	Craciformes	1. Cracidae; 2. Megapodiidae	Families included in Galliformes.
Galloanserae	Gallomorphae	Galliformes	1. Phasianidae; 2. Numididae; 3. Odontophoridae	Now includes craciform families.
Galloanserae	Anserimorphae	Anseriformes	1. Anhimidae; 2. Anseranatidae; 3. Dendrocygnidae; 4. Anatidae	
Turnicae		Turniciformes	1. Turnicidae	Included in Charadriiformes.
Picae		Piciformes	1. Indicatoridae; 2. Picidae; 3. Megalaimidae; 4. Lybiidae; 5. Ramphastidae	
Coraciae	Galbulimorphae	Galbuliformes	1. Galbulidae; 2. Bucconidae	Families included in Piciformes by most authorities.
Coraciae	Bucerotimorphae	Bucerotiformes	1. Bucerotidae; 2. Bucorvidae	
Coraciae	Bucerotimorphae	Upupiformes	1. Upupidae; 2. Phoeniculidae; 3. Rhinopomastidae	Families included in Bucerotiformes by most authorities.
Coraciae	Coraciimorphae	Trogoniformes	1. Trogonidae	
Coraciae	Coraciimorphae	Coraciiformes	1. Coraciidae; 2. Brachypteraciidae; 3. Leptosomidae; 4. Momotidae; 5. Todidae; 6. Alcedinidae; 7. Halcyonidae; 8. Cerylidae; 9. Meropidae	Coraciiformes found to be paraphyletic. Leptosomidae now classified in Leptosomiformes; Halcyonidae and Cerylidae merged into Alcedinidae
Coliae		Coliiformes	1. Coliidae	
Passerae	Cuculimorphae	Cuculiformes	1. Cuculidae; 2. Centropodidae; 3. Coccyzidae; 4. Opisthocomidae; 5. Crotophagidae; 6. Neomorphidae	Opisthocomidae now placed in own order, Opisthocomiformes.; Cuckoos (all other families) are now typically merged into Cuculidae.
Passerae	Psittacimorphae	Psittaciformes	1. Psittacidae	Psittacidae now split into Strigopidae, Cacatuidae, Psittacidae and Psittaculidae at least. Strigopidae is sometimes split into Strigopidae and Nestoridae, and Psittaculidae is sometimes split into Psittrichasiidae and Psittaculidae.
Passerae	Apodimorphae	Apodiformes	1. Apodidae; 2. Hemiprocnidae	Included in Caprimulgiformes sensu lato or Caprimulgimorphae (Strisores). Otherwise in enlarged Apodiformes.
Passerae	Apodimorphae	Trochiliformes	1. Trochilidae	Included in Caprimulgiformes sensu lato or Caprimulgimorphae (Strisores). Otherwise in enlarged Apodiformes.
Passerae	Strigimorphae	Musophagiformes	1. Musophagidae	
Passerae	Strigimorphae	Strigiformes	1. Tytonidae; 2. Strigidae; 3. Aegothelidae; 4. Podargidae; 5. Batrachostomidae; 6. Steatornithidae; 7. Nyctibiidae; 8. Eurostopodidae; 9. Caprimulgidae	Strigiformes found to be polyphyletic and now restricted to owls (Tytonidae, Strigidae) Other families are placed in Caprimulgiformes sensu lato or Caprimulgimorphae (Strisores). In the latter case, the ordinal assignments are as follows: Aegothelidae now in Aegotheliformes or Apodiformes; Frogmouths (Podargidae and Batrachostomidae) now in Podargiformes, and typically merged into Podargidae.; Steatornithidae now in Steatornithiformes; Nyctibiidae now in Nyctibiiformes
Passerae	Passerimorphae	Columbiformes	1. Raphidae; 2. Columbidae	Columbidae now considered paraphyletic, so Raphidae now merged into it.
Passerae	Passerimorphae	Gruiformes	1. Eurypygidae; 2. Otididae; 3. Gruidae; 4. Aramidae; 5. Heliornithidae; 6. Psophiidae; 7. Cariamidae; 8. Rhynochetidae; 9. Rallidae; 10. Mesitornithidae	Gruiformes found to be polyphyletic: Eurypygidae and Rhynochetidae now in Eurypygiformes; Odtidae now in Otidiformes; Cariamidae now in Cariamiformes; Mesitornithidae now in Mesitornithiformes.
Passerae	Passerimorphae	Ciconiiformes	1. Pteroclidae; 2. Thinocoridae; 3. Pedionomidae; 4. Scolopacidae; 5. Rostratulidae; 6. Jacanidae; 7. Chionidae; 8. Pluvianellidae; 9. Burhinidae; 10. Charadriidae; 11. Glareolidae; 12. Laridae; 13. Accipitridae; 14. Sagittariidae; 15. Falconidae; 16. Podicipedidae; 17. Phaethontidae; 18. Sulidae; 19. Anhingidae; 20. Phalacrocoracidae; 21. Ardeidae; 22. Scopidae; 23. Phoenicopteridae; 24. Threskiornithidae; 25. Pelecanidae; 26. Ciconiidae; 27. Fregatidae; 28. Spheniscidae; 29. Gaviidae; 30. Procellariidae	Ciconiiformes found to be non-monophyletic and now restricted to storks (Ciconiidae). The other families are distributed between: Pterocliformes (Pteroclidae); Charadriiformes (Thinocoridae through Laridae); Accipitriformes (Accipitridae, Sagittariidae); Falconiformes (Falconidae); Podicipediformes (Podicipedidae); Phaethontiformes (Phaethontidae); Suliformes (Sulidae, Anhingidae, Phalacrocoracidae, Fregatidae); Pelecaniformes (Ardeidae, Scopidae, Threskiornithidae, Pelecanidae); Phoenicopteriformes (Phoenicopteridae); Sphenisciformes (Spheniscidae); Gaviiformes (Gaviidae); Procellariiformes (Procellariidae)
Passerae	Passerimorphae	Passeriformes	1. Acanthisittidae; 2. Pittidae; 3. Eurylaimidae; 4. Philepittidae; 5. Tyrannidae; 6. Thamnophilidae; 7. Furnariidae; 8. Formicariidae; 9. Conopophagidae; 10. Rhinocryptidae; 11. Climacteridae; 12. Menuridae; 13. Ptilonorhynchidae; 14. Maluridae; 15. Meliphagidae; 16. Pardalotidae; 17. Petroicidae; 18. Irenidae; 19. Orthonychidae; 20. Pomatostomidae; 21. Laniidae; 22. Vireonidae; 23. Corvidae; 24. Callaeatidae; 25. Picathartidae; 26. Bombycillidae; 27. Cinclidae; 28. Muscicapidae; 29. Sturnidae; 30. Sittidae; 31. Certhiidae; 32. Paridae; 33. Aegithalidae; 34. Hirundinidae; 35. Regulidae; 36. Pycnonotidae; 37. Hypocoliidae; 38. Cisticolidae; 39. Zosteropidae; 40. Sylviidae; 41. Alaudidae; 42. Nectariniidae; 43. Melanocharitidae; 44. Paramythiidae; 45. Passeridae; 46. Fringillidae	

== See also ==
- Molecular phylogenetics
- Phylogenetic nomenclature
- Charles Sibley
- Sibley–Monroe checklist
- List of birds (based on the Clements taxonomy)
