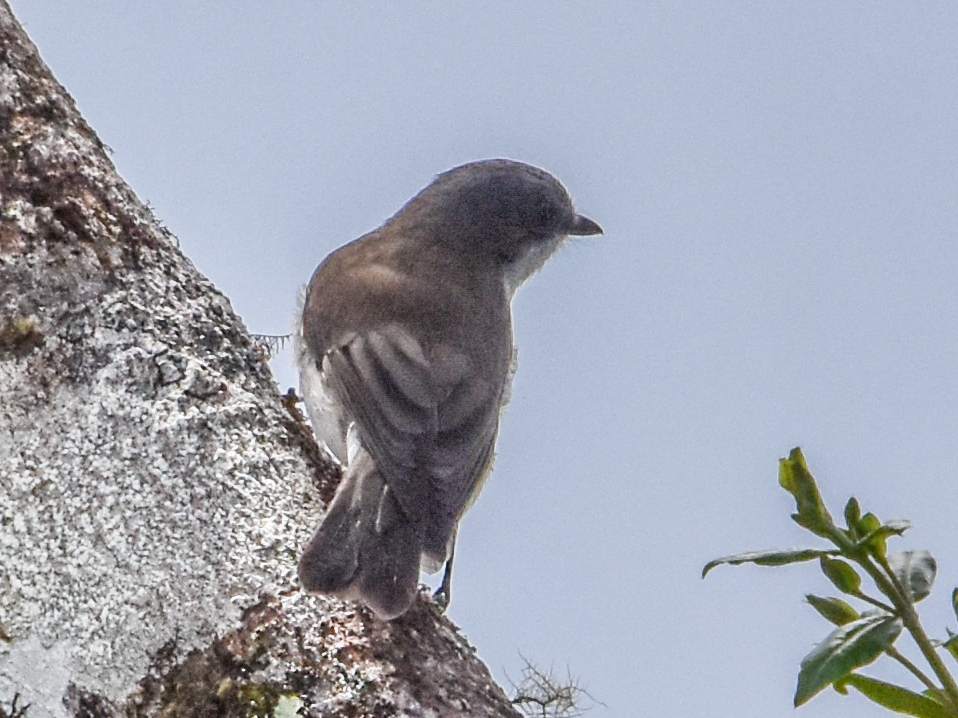

Conservation status
- Least Concern (IUCN 3.1)

Scientific classification
- Kingdom: Animalia
- Phylum: Chordata
- Class: Aves
- Order: Passeriformes
- Family: Pachycephalidae
- Genus: Pachycephala
- Species: P. modesta

Binomial name
- Pachycephala modesta (De Vis, 1894)

Subspecies
- See text

Synonyms
- Poecilodryas modesta

= Brown-backed whistler =

Species of bird

The brown-backed whistler (Pachycephala modesta) is a species of bird in the family Pachycephalidae endemic to Papua New Guinea. Its natural habitat is subtropical or tropical moist montane forests. It features a grey head, brown upperparts, a white throat and off-white underparts with a greyish chest wash.

== Taxonomy and systematics ==
The brown-backed whistler was originally described in the genus Poecilodryas.

=== Subspecies ===
Three subspecies are recognized:

- Pachycephala modesta hypoleuca – Reichenow, 1915: Originally described as a separate species. Found in east-central New Guinea
- Pachycephala modesta modesta – (De Vis, 1894): Found in southeast New Guinea
- Pachycephala modesta telefolminensis – Gilliard & LeCroy, 1961: Found in central New Guinea
