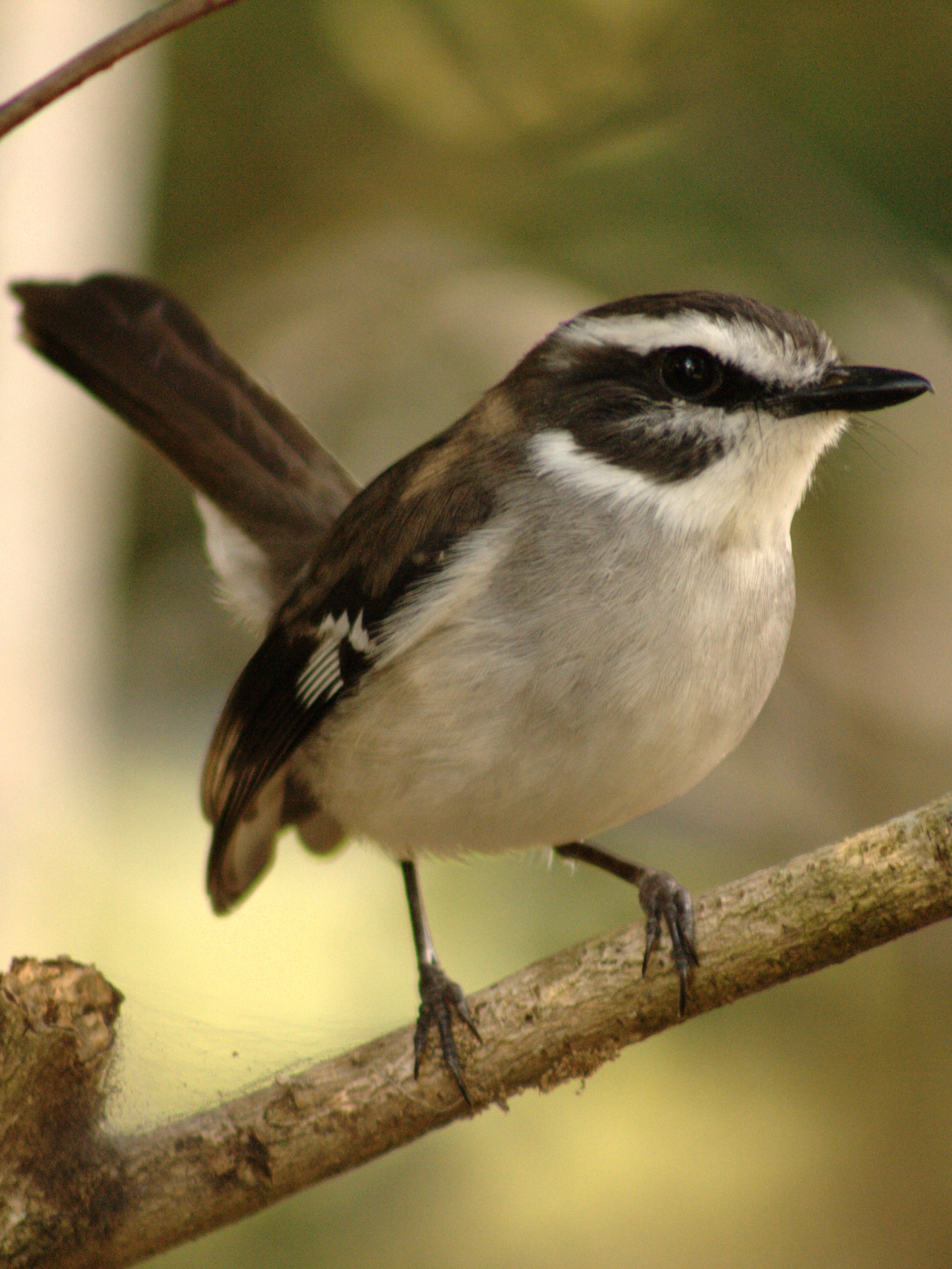
- White-browed robin (Poecilodryas superciliosa)

Scientific classification
- Kingdom: Animalia
- Phylum: Chordata
- Class: Aves
- Order: Passeriformes
- Family: Petroicidae
- Genus: Poecilodryas; Gould, 1865

Type species
- Petroica cerviniventris Gould, 1858

Species
- see text

= Poecilodryas =

Genus of birds

Poecilodryas is a genus of passerine birds in the Australasian robin family Petroicidae.

The genus was erected by the English ornithologist and bird artist John Gould in 1865. The type species was subsequently designated as the buff-sided robin (Poecilodryas cerviniventris). The genus name combines the Ancient Greek poikilos "variegated" with dryad "tree-nymph".

== Species ==
The genus contains three species:

| Image | Scientific name | Common name | Distribution |
|---|---|---|---|
| | Poecilodryas hypoleuca | Black-sided robin | Indonesia and Papua New Guinea |
| | Poecilodryas superciliosa | White-browed robin | north-eastern Australia |
| | Poecilodryas cerviniventris | Buff-sided robin | northern Australia |

Formerly, some authorities also placed the following species (or subspecies) in the genus Poecilodryas:

- Brown-backed whistler (now Pachycephala modesta in the family Pachycephalidae)
- Golden monarch (nitidus) (now Carterornis nitida in the family Monarchidae)
- Black-throated robin (now Plesiodryas albonotata)
- Banded yellow robin (now Gennaeodryas placens)
