= Jon E. Ahlquist =

American molecular biologist and ornithologist

Jon Edward Ahlquist (27 July 1944 – 7 May 2020) was an American molecular biologist and ornithologist who has specialized in molecular phylogenetics. He collaborated extensively with Charles Sibley, primarily at Yale University. By 1987, both Ahlquist and Sibley had left Yale. In 1988, Ahlquist and Sibley were awarded the Daniel Giraud Elliot Medal by the National Academy of Sciences. In January 1991 (often listed as 1990), Charles Sibley and Ahlquist published Phylogeny and Classification of Birds, which presented a new phylogeny for birds based on DNA–DNA hybridization techniques, known as the Sibley-Ahlquist taxonomy. At that time, he was an associate professor of zoology at Ohio University. In 1999, Ahlquist was retired. Later in life, Ahlquist became a Creationist and disavowed some of his previous work.

== See also ==
- Sibley–Ahlquist taxonomy of birds
