= Charles Sibley =

American ornithologist and microbiologist

Charles Gald Sibley (August 7, 1917 – April 12, 1998) was an American ornithologist and molecular biologist. He had an immense influence on the scientific classification of birds, and the work that Sibley initiated has substantially altered our understanding of the evolutionary history of modern birds.

Sibley's taxonomy has been a major influence on the sequences adopted by ornithological organizations, especially the American Ornithologists' Union.

== Life and work ==
Educated in California (A.B. 1940; Ph.D. 1948 in Zoology, University of California, Berkeley. Minor fields: Paleontology, Botany), he did his first fieldwork in Mexico in 1939 and 1941, then in Solomon Islands, Bismarck Archipelago, New Guinea, and the Philippines during World War II while on leave from the U.S. Navy, in which he was Ensign to Lieutenant in the Communications and Medical Service Corps. He was based for much of the war at Emirau Island, in what is now New Ireland Province of Papua New Guinea. His first job after college was from 1948 to 1949 as instructor in Zoology and Curator of Birds, University of Kansas, followed from 1949 to 1953 as assistant professor of zoology, San Jose State College, California. From 1953 to 1965 he was associate professor then Professor of Zoology and director of the ornithological laboratory at Cornell. Between 1965 and 1986 he was Professor of Biology and William Robertson Coe Prof. of Ornithology, Dept of Biology; and Curator of Birds at the Peabody Museum at Yale. From 1986 to 1992 he was Dean's Professor of Science and Professor of Biology at San Francisco State University, and from 1993 until his death he was adjunct professor of biology at Sonoma State University.

Sibley developed an interest in hybridization and its implications for evolution and taxonomy and, in the early 1960s he began to focus on molecular studies: of blood proteins, and then the electrophoresis of egg-white proteins.

By the early 1970s Sibley was pioneering DNA–DNA hybridization studies, with the aim of discovering, once and for all, the true relationships between the modern orders of birds. These were highly controversial to begin with, and regarded by colleagues as anything from snake-oil salesmanship on the one hand to Holy Writ on the other. With the passage of time and ever-improving laboratory methods, the balance of scientific opinion has shifted closer to the latter interpretation, though the picture is by no means clear-cut and simple. Some of Sibley's results – such as the close relationship of galliform birds and waterfowl and their distinctness from other neognaths – have been verified. Other results such as the inclusion of diverse groups into the Ciconiiformes have turned out to be very much in error.

Sibley became estranged from his American co-workers for a time and corresponded with overseas colleagues extensively. But by the mid to late 1980s, Sibley's ongoing work had reversed the trend. His revised phylogeny of living birds in the light of DNA analysis, published in various forms in 1986–1993 was both controversial and highly influential.

In 1986 he was elected a Member, National Academy of Sciences, U.S.A. In 1988 Sibley and Jon Ahlquist were awarded the Daniel Giraud Elliot Medal from the National Academy of Sciences. He was elected President of the International Ornithological Congress in 1990. His landmark publications, Phylogeny and Classification of Birds (written with Ahlquist) and Distribution and Taxonomy of Birds of the World (with Burt Monroe) are among the most-cited of all ornithological works, the former setting out the influential Sibley–Ahlquist taxonomy.

== Personality ==
During the 1970s, Sibley was a highly controversial figure in ornithological circles, for both professional and personal reasons. His friend Richard Schodde, writing Sibley's obituary in Emu, commented that he was:

... a rebel with a cause. In argument he would bulldoze through, brooking no contradiction. Critics were baited with an acid tongue, and, in fits of temper, he could be a cruel mimic. In short, lesser mortals were not tolerated easily and, as has been said by others, collegiate friends were few. ... I never found him malicious or vindictive, even against those who had tried to bring him down. Nor was he particularly sophisticated or cultured, just a big, up-front Yank possessed by 'the big picture' in avian phylogeny and convinced of the righteousness of his cause and invincibility of his intellect.

Partly due to personality conflicts, Sibley had few long-term collaborations with other scientists, with the notable exception of Jon Ahlquist. Nonetheless, he was effective in persuading others to provide him with the blood, tissue, and egg white samples which were the key to his work.

== See also ==
- Sibley–Ahlquist taxonomy of birds
