= DNA–DNA hybridization =

Technique used to measure similarity in DNA sequences

In genomics, DNA–DNA hybridization is a molecular biology technique that measures the degree of genetic similarity between DNA sequences. It is used to determine the genetic distance between two organisms and has been used extensively in phylogeny and taxonomy.

== Method ==
The DNA of one organism is labelled, then mixed with the unlabelled DNA to be compared against. The mixture is incubated to allow DNA strands to dissociate and then cooled to form renewed hybrid double-stranded DNA. Hybridized sequences with a high degree of similarity will bind more firmly, and require more energy to separate them. An example is they separate when heated at a higher temperature than dissimilar sequences, a process known as "DNA melting".

There are many possible setups for this experiment that can differentiate the to-be-tested DNA against the template DNA. Besides chemical-fluorescence or radioactive labeling, one could also chemically attach one of the molecules to an insoluble material (immobilization).

Similarity per DDH can be measured in two ways: by melting temperature, generally defined for when 50% of the strands are disassociated from each other, or by a percentage relative binding ratio.

=== Temperature scoring ===
To assess the melting profile of the hybridized DNA, the double-stranded DNA is bound to a column or filter and the mixture is heated in small steps. At each step, the column or filter is washed; then sequences that melt become single-stranded and wash off. The temperatures at which labelled DNA comes off reflects the amount of similarity between sequences (and the self-hybridization sample serves as a control). The differences in melting temperature compared to the T_{m} of self-hybridization, −ΔT_{m}, are used as the genetic distance measure.

=== Reassociation scoring ===
A more modern method is to subject the test-mixture to a process of hot melting, warm re-hybridization, and cool washing. By subtracting the total amount of DNA from the washed-off amount of DNA, one determines the amount of DNA molecules that has managed to re-hybridize during the warm phase. The genetic similarity is expressed as a percentage ratio between the retained-amount of the test-pair and the retained-amount of a control identical-pair.

=== Variants ===
In 1969, one such method was performed by Mary Lou Pardue and Joseph G. Gall at the Yale University through radioactivity where it involved the hybridization of a radioactive test DNA in solution to the stationary DNA of a cytological preparation, which is identified as autoradiography.

A "checkerboard" method was introduced to hybridize a large number of DNA samples against numerous DNA probes on a single membrane. The samples would need to be separated into individual lanes within the membrane, which would then be rotated to allow simultaneous hybridization with multiple DNA probes.

In 2004, a new DDH technique was described. This technique utilized microplates and colorimetrically labelled DNA to decrease the time needed and increase the amount of samples that can be processed.

== Uses ==
When several species are compared, similarity values allow organisms to be arranged in a distance matrix, which can produce a phylogenetic tree. It is therefore, one possible approach to carrying out molecular systematics.

=== In microbiology ===
DNA–DNA hybridization (DDH) is used as a primary method to distinguish bacterial species as it is difficult to visually classify them accurately. This technique is not widely used on larger organisms where differences in species are easier to identify. In the late 1900s, strains were considered to belong to the same species if they had a DNA–DNA similarity value greater than 70% and their melting temperatures were within 5 °C of each other. In 2014, a threshold of 79% similarity has been suggested to separate bacterial subspecies.

DDH is a common technique for bacteria, but it is labor intensive, error-prone, and technically challenging. The microplate method proposed in 2004 have become the standard for bacterial taxonomy.

=== In zoology ===
Charles Sibley and Jon Ahlquist, pioneers of the technique, used DNA–DNA hybridization to examine the phylogenetic relationships of avians (the Sibley–Ahlquist taxonomy) and primates.

== Replacement by genome sequencing ==
Critics argue that the technique is inaccurate for comparison of closely related species, as any attempt to measure differences between orthologous sequences between organisms is overwhelmed by the hybridization of paralogous sequences within an organism's genome. DNA sequencing and computational comparisons of sequences is now generally the method for determining genetic distance. although the technique is still used in microbiology to help identify bacteria.

=== In silico methods ===
The modern approach is to carry out DNA–DNA hybridization in silico utilizes completely or partially sequenced genomes. Digital DDH (dDDH) is developed at the DSMZ and uses the GBDP (Genome Blast Distance Phylogeny) algorithm to produce DDH-analogous methods. DSMZ offers several web services based on dDDH. dDDH does not suffer from DDH's issues with paralogous genes, large repeats, reduced genomes, and low-complexity regions. Among other algorithmic improvements, it solves the problem with paralogous sequences by carefully filtering them from the matches between the two genome sequences.

dDDH has been used for resolving difficult taxa such as Escherichia coli, Bacillus cereus group, and Aeromonas. The Judicial Commission of International Committee on Systematics of Prokaryotes has admitted dDDH as taxonomic evidence.

== See also ==
- DNA melting
- Temperature gradient gel electrophoresis
