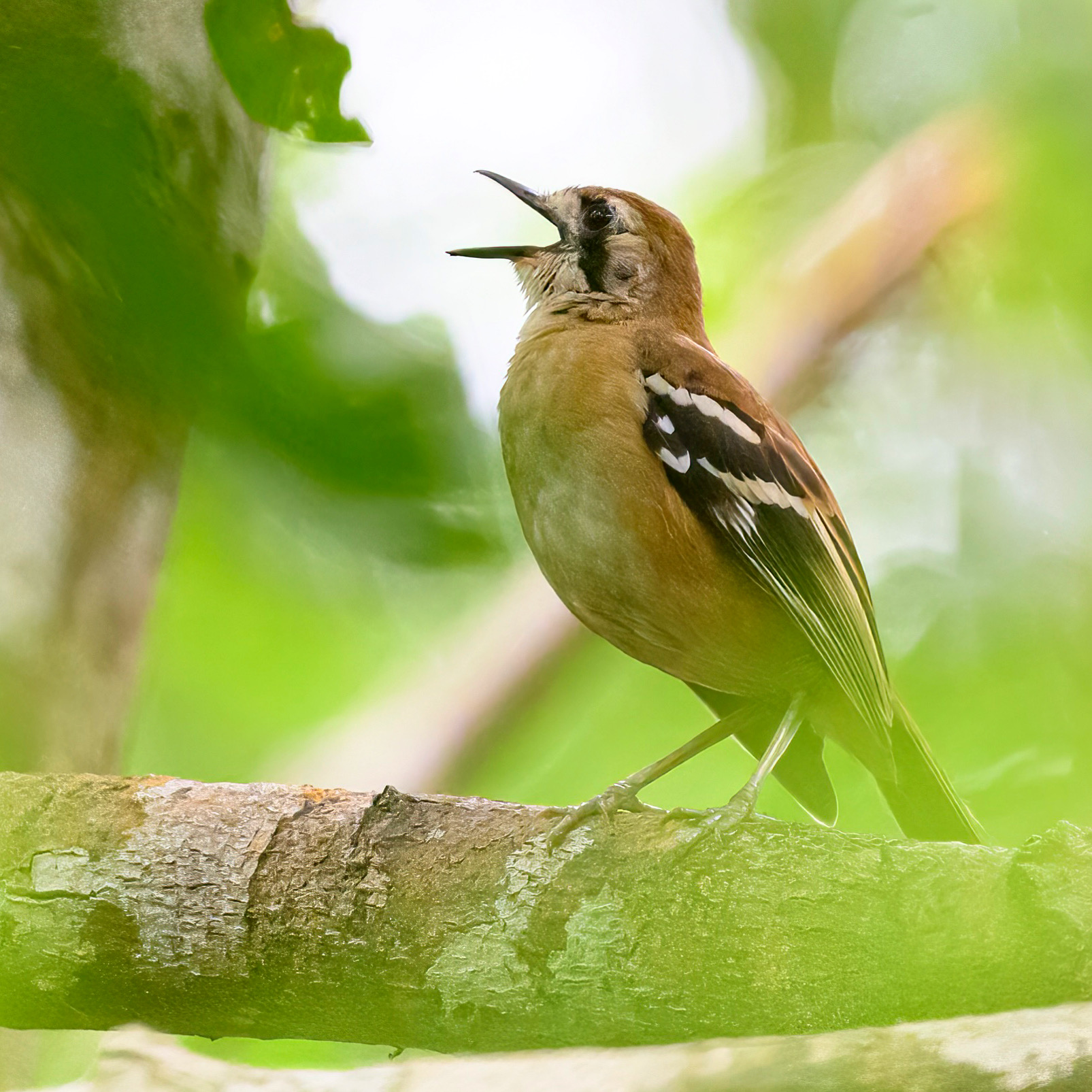

Conservation status
- Least Concern (IUCN 3.1)

Scientific classification
- Kingdom: Animalia
- Phylum: Chordata
- Class: Aves
- Order: Passeriformes
- Family: Petroicidae
- Genus: Drymodes
- Species: D. superciliaris

Binomial name
- Drymodes superciliaris Gould, 1850

= Northern scrub robin =

Species of bird

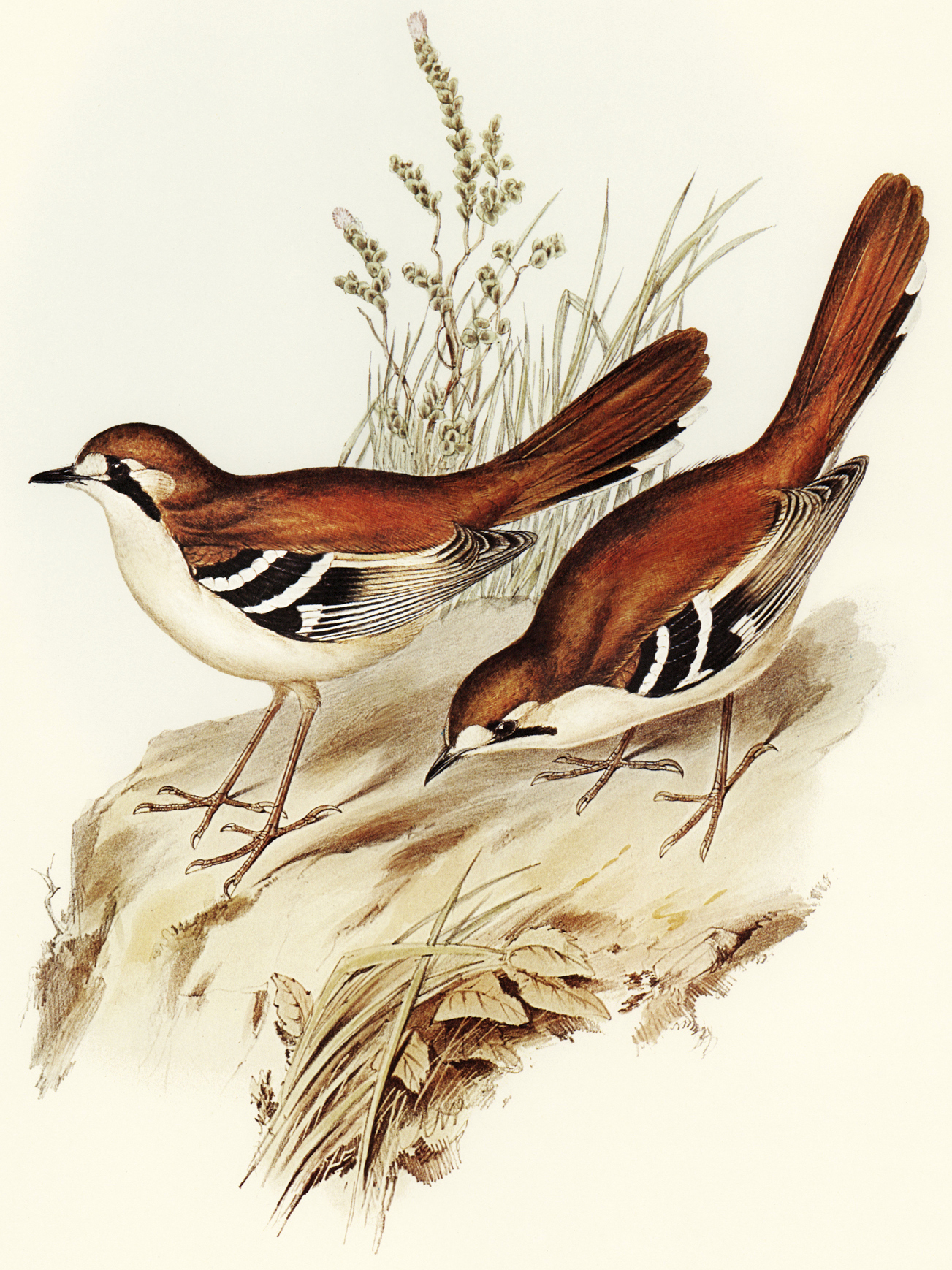
Bird illustration by Elizabeth Gould for Birds of Australia

The northern scrub robin (Drymodes superciliaris) is a species of bird in the family Petroicidae. It is found in northern Cape York Peninsula in Queensland, Australia. It was found to be genetically distinct from the Papuan scrub robin, which were thought to be members of the same species.

A putative subspecies D. s. colcloughi, known as the Roper River scrub robin, was described by Gregory Mathews in 1914 from specimens supposedly collected from the Northern Territory of Australia. However, there have been no further records from the area, the provenance of the specimens has been questioned, and the taxon is controversial.
