= Roper River scrub robin =

Conservation status
- Extinct (EPBC Act)

Scientific classification (disputed)
- Kingdom: Animalia
- Phylum: Chordata
- Class: Aves
- Order: Passeriformes
- Family: Petroicidae
- Genus: Drymodes
- Species: D. superciliaris
- Subspecies: D. s. colcloughi

Trinomial name
- Drymodes superciliaris colcloughi Mathews, 1914

Extinct subspecies of bird

The Roper River scrub robin (Drymodes superciliaris colcloughi), also known as the allied scrub robin, is a putative subspecies of the northern scrub robin, a bird in the Petroicidae, or Australasian robin family. Whether it ever existed is doubtful; if it did it is almost certainly extinct.

== History ==
The subspecies was described in 1914 by Gregory Mathews and named subspecifically for the collector, M. J. Colclough. The description was based on two skins obtained in 1910, supposedly from the tropical monsoonal Roper River region of the eastern Top End of the Northern Territory of Australia. The specimens were taken by an ornithological collecting expedition sponsored by wealthy amateur ornithologist and oologist H. L. White. The expedition was in the Roper area from 15 July until 22 November 1910.

== Description ==
There are only two specimens of the scrub robin, the holotype, a male held in the American Museum of Natural History (registered 585473), and a female in the Queensland Museum. Of these, Mathews said in his original description that the taxon differed from the nominate subspecies D. s. superciliaris, confined to the northern end of the Cape York Peninsula in Queensland, more than 800 km north-east of the Roper, by "being much redder on the back and entirely reddish-buff on the undersurface". Simon Bennett, in a 1983 overview in the Emu found that there were valid, though slight, differences between the birds from the two localities, in particular with the Roper male having its "throat, ear-coverts and forehead washed with rufous". However, Richard Schodde and Ian Mason commented in 1999 that the Roper River specimens did not differ significantly in colouration and measurements from those of the Cape York Peninsula.

== Validity and status ==
The validity of the taxon is primarily based on whether a population of scrub robins existed in the Northern Territory, the only records of such being the two skins collected by Colclough in 1910 on the Roper River. Another member of the 1910 expedition, E. D. Frizelle, collected several clutches of eggs purporting to be those of northern scrub robins from the Roper. Some of these clutches are now in the H. L. White Collection at the National Museum of Victoria, but upon reappraisal have been found to be those of misidentified buff-sided robins.

Several dedicated, though fruitless, searches for scrub robins along the Roper were undertaken in 1980, during the data-collection phase of the first Atlas of Australian Birds project (1977–1981), by Simon Bennett and others. Bennett accepted the validity of the original collection location, though he admitted that the poor documentation of the specimens raised the issue of credibility. He suggested that they represented a relict population inhabiting small and isolated thickets of vegetation on the banks of permanent watercourses. He speculated that the population had been adversely affected by the advent of extensive cattle grazing and changes in fire regime since European settlement of the Roper region. He also raised the possibility of birds surviving along rivers north of the Roper in eastern Arnhem Land. The subspecies is listed by the Australian Government as Extinct and by the Northern Territory Government as Data Deficient. Schodde and Mason have opined:

Because doubt attaches its provenance ... colcloughi should be struck from the Australian avian inventory until the unlikely event of its rediscovery. Its collector, Colclough, passed through Cape York on the expedition which took it, and included in his manuscript list of Roper River birds a number of other species known only from northeast Australia ... Thus, given its similarity to the Cape York Peninsula form, his "Drymodes superciliaris" from the Roper is probably either a case of mistaken locality or a hoax.
