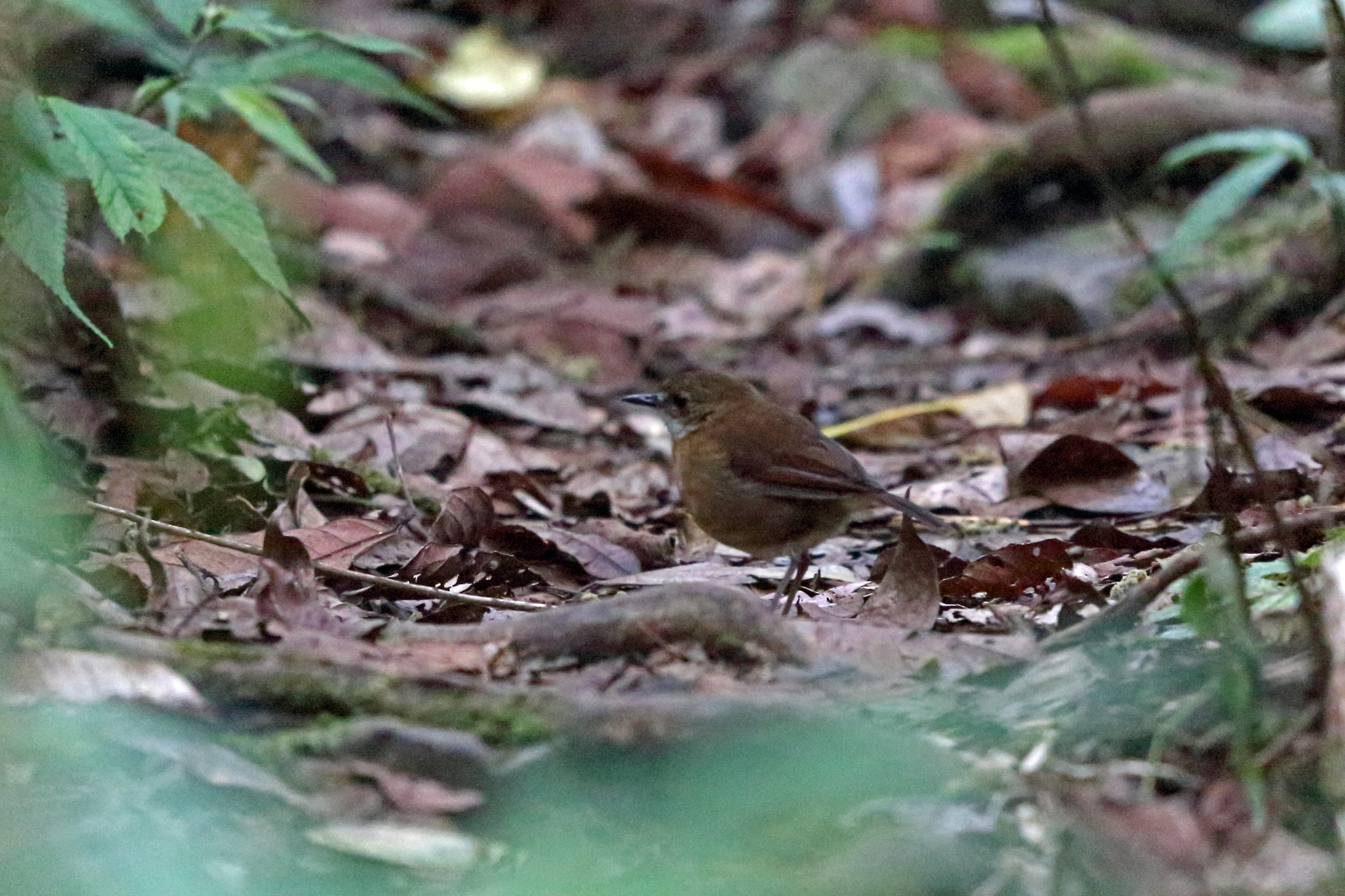

Conservation status
- Least Concern (IUCN 3.1)

Scientific classification
- Kingdom: Animalia
- Phylum: Chordata
- Class: Aves
- Order: Passeriformes
- Family: Petroicidae
- Genus: Amalocichla
- Species: A. incerta

Binomial name
- Amalocichla incerta (Salvadori, 1876)

= Lesser ground robin =

Species of songbird native to New Guinea

The lesser ground robin (Amalocichla incerta) is a species of bird in the family Petroicidae. It is found in New Guinea.

== Description ==
It is 15 cm long and is dark brown with paler underparts and a white throat.

== Mating and nesting ==
It nests on the ground or in low tree hollows.
