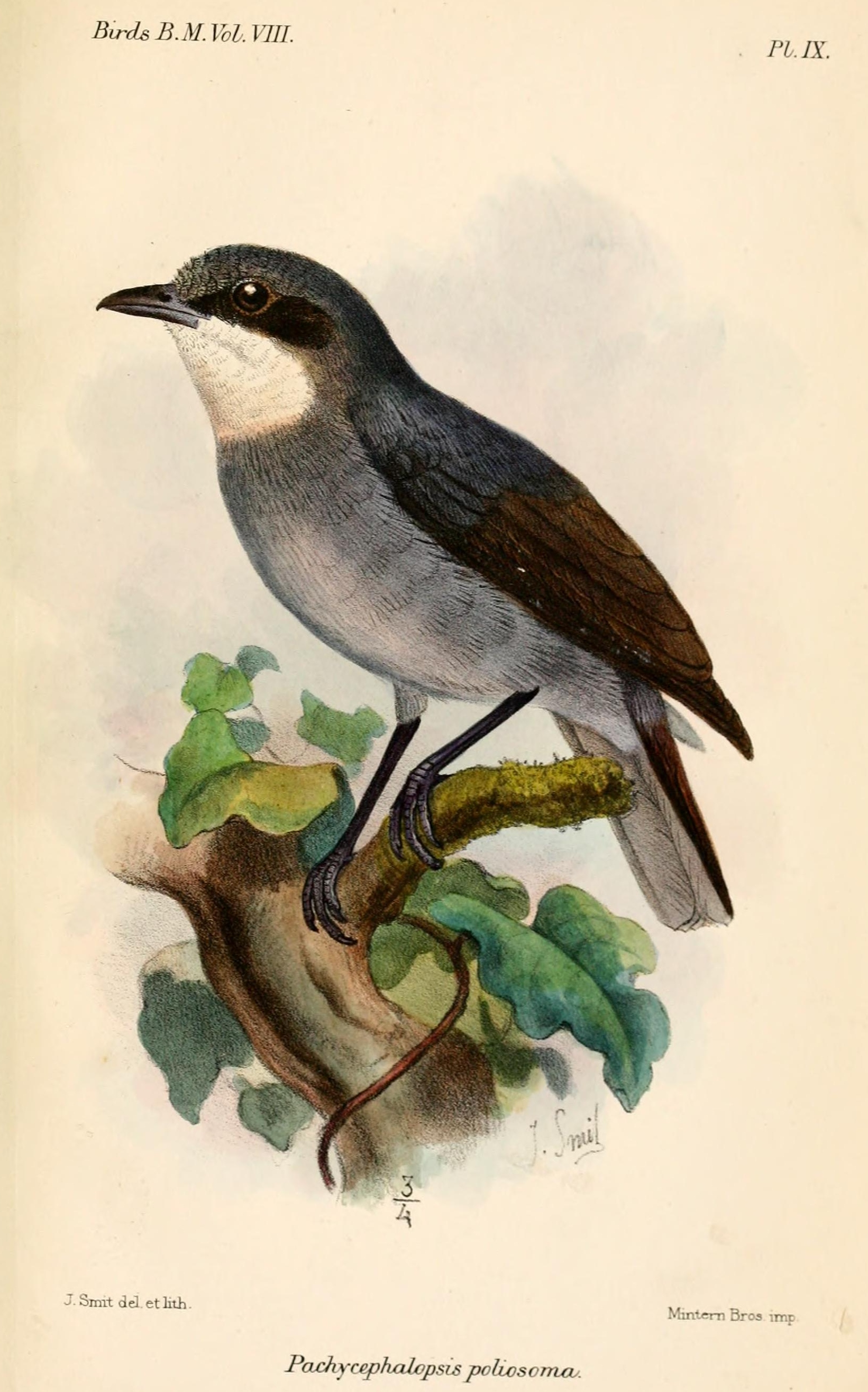

Conservation status
- Least Concern (IUCN 3.1)

Scientific classification
- Kingdom: Animalia
- Phylum: Chordata
- Class: Aves
- Order: Passeriformes
- Family: Petroicidae
- Genus: Pachycephalopsis
- Species: P. poliosoma

Binomial name
- Pachycephalopsis poliosoma Sharpe, 1882

= White-eyed robin =

Species of songbird native to New Guinea

The white-eyed robin (Pachycephalopsis poliosoma) is a medium-sized bird weighing between 35 and 42 grams and measuring around 15 to 16.5 centimeters in length. It is found in Indonesia and Papua New Guinea.

== Habitat ==
Its natural habitat is subtropical or tropical moist montane forest. It lives in the hills and montane forests of New Guinea, where it prefers areas with lots of plants and trees. These spots provide good cover and plenty of food. The white-eyed robin often sits on low branches, where it monitors the ground, watching for prey. Its habitat is similar to that of other robins, such as the slaty (Melanodryas cyanus) and smoky robins (Peneothello cryptoleuca). Each tends to stick to a specific level within the forest, minimizing competition. The white-eyed robin shares its habitat with many other species, showing how adaptable it is. These forests vary greatly in temperature and elevation, requiring flexibility.

== Description ==
It is dark grey with a black eye-stripe, a brown tail and a white throat. Its bill is short and its eyes are brown. It has a strong, sturdy body with gray feathers that are slightly lighter on the belly. Its face and wings are darker, which makes its pale eyes stand out. Its eyes contrast against its dark facial features and gray throat, making it easy to recognize.

== Behavior ==
The white-eyed robin mainly eats insects, and it hunts using a "sit-and-wait" approach. It perches quietly on a low branch, watching for any movement that could mean food. When it has the chance, it eats eggs or nestlings.

In Papua New Guinea

The white-eyed robin is known best for its unique sound, which starts as a loud, raspy whistle. As it continues, the sounds become rougher and quicker, possibly reflecting excitement or agitation. Its loud whistle is used to call a mate or warn others to stay away from its territory. Its recognizable call helps the bird communicate within its environment and even alert others to danger.

== Conservation status ==
The white-eyed robin faces no urgent threats. However, its habitat is at risk due to deforestation and other human activities.
