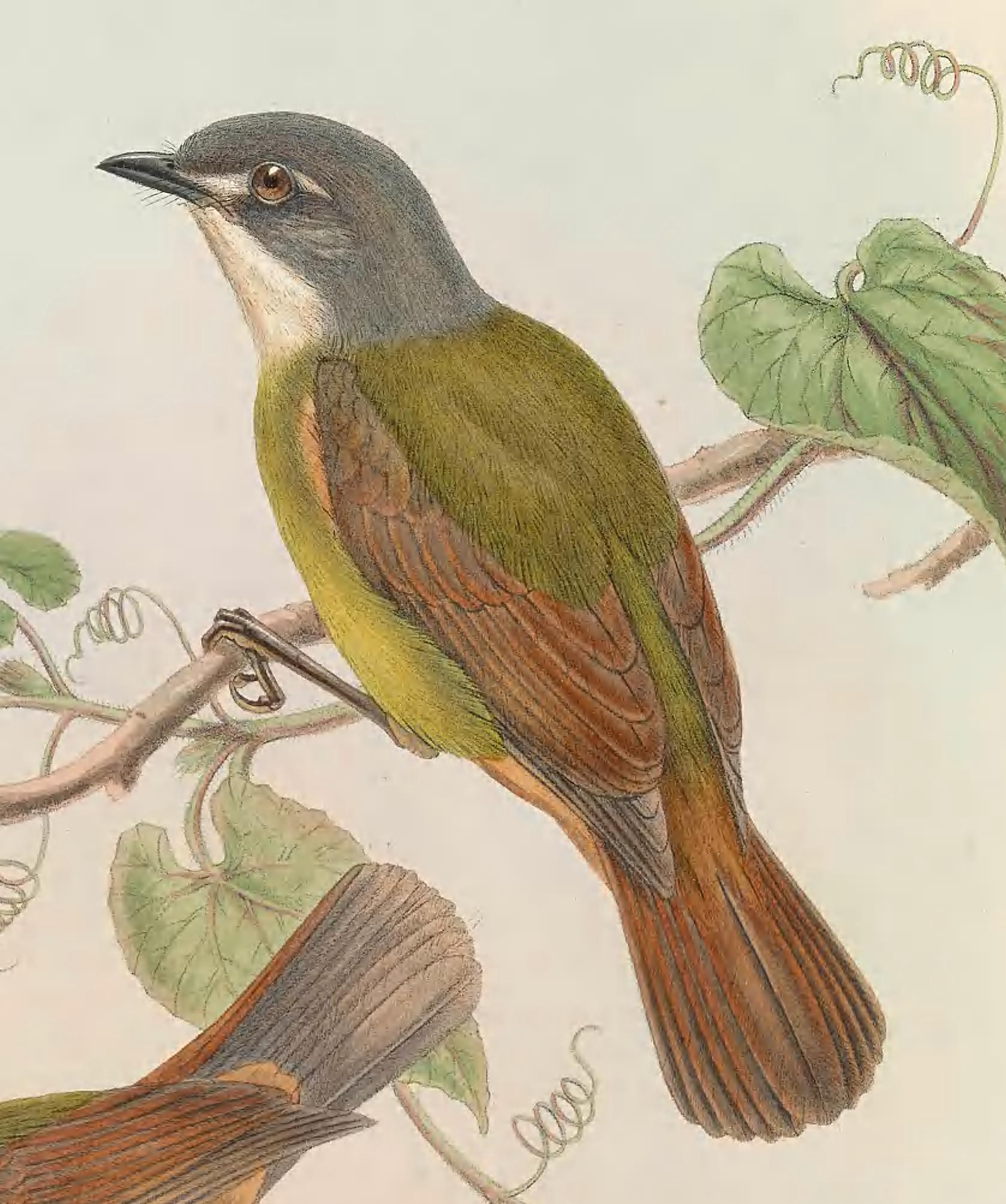
- Male illustration by William Matthew Hart
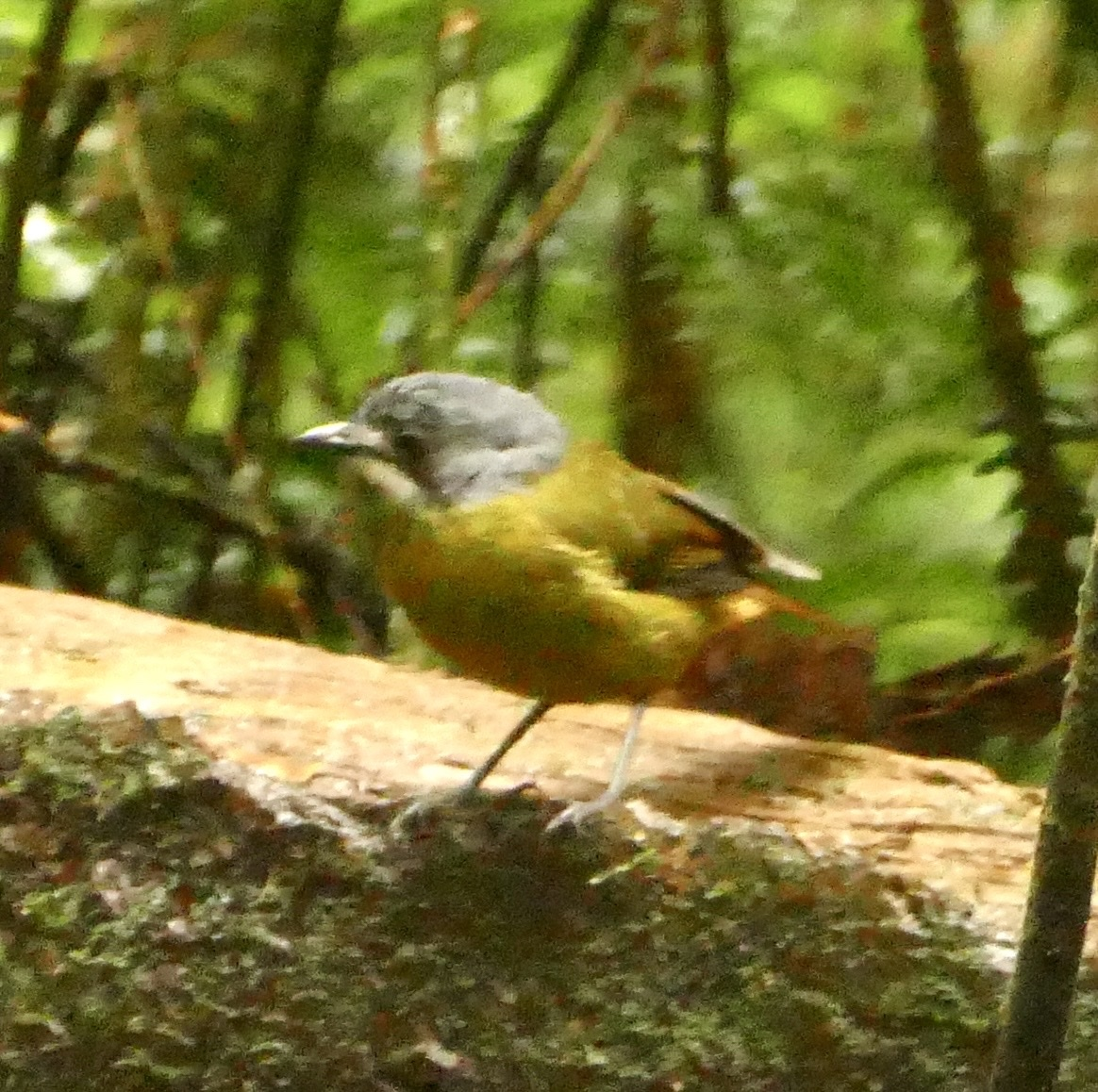

Conservation status
- Least Concern (IUCN 3.1)

Scientific classification
- Kingdom: Animalia
- Phylum: Chordata
- Class: Aves
- Order: Passeriformes
- Family: Petroicidae
- Genus: Pachycephalopsis
- Species: P. hattamensis

Binomial name
- Pachycephalopsis hattamensis (Meyer, 1874)

= Green-backed robin =

Species of songbird native to New Guinea

The green-backed robin (Pachycephalopsis hattamensis) is a species of bird in the family Petroicidae. It is found in New Guinea. Its natural habitats are subtropical or tropical moist lowland forest and subtropical or tropical moist montane forest.

== Description ==
It is sexually monomorphic. It has an olive-green back, rust-colored wings, a rust-colored tail, and a yellow abdomen.

== Vocalization ==
Both sexes vocalize. Their most common vocalization has been described as a "tu-wee" sound. They also produce "piping whistles" and "raspy chur-chatters."

== Breeding and Nesting ==
It breeds during New Guinea's wet season, and lays eggs in cup-shaped nests low to the ground in trees. Little research has been done on clutch size, but one egg is recorded as a seemingly typical clutch size.
