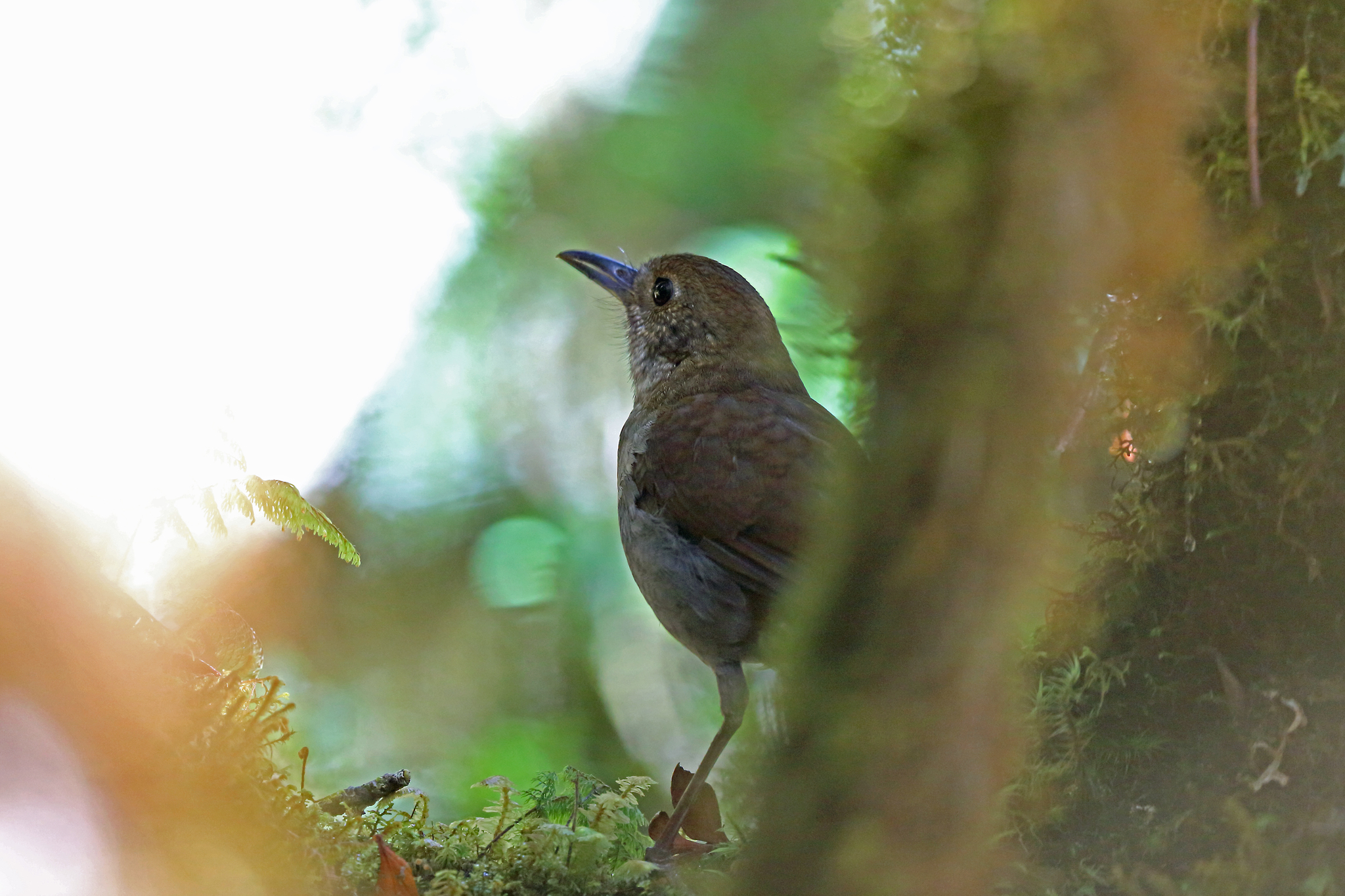

Conservation status
- Least Concern (IUCN 3.1)

Scientific classification
- Kingdom: Animalia
- Phylum: Chordata
- Class: Aves
- Order: Passeriformes
- Family: Petroicidae
- Genus: Amalocichla
- Species: A. sclateriana

Binomial name
- Amalocichla sclateriana De Vis, 1892

= Greater ground robin =

Species of songbird native to New Guinea

The greater ground robin (Amalocichla sclateriana) is a species of bird in the family Petroicidae. It is found in New Guinea.

== Taxonomy and systematics ==
There are two recognised subspecies of the greater ground robin:

- Amalocichla sclateriana sclateriana - The nominate subspecies, found in the mountains of the Huon Peninsula.
- Amalocichla sclateriana occidentalis - Found in the Oranje Mountains in central New Guinea. It has browner and more mottled underparts than the nominate subspecies does.

== Description ==
It is the largest robin in New Guinea, at 20 cm (7.9 in) in length.

== Distribution and habitat ==
It is endemic to New Guinea. It is found at elevations of 2,500–3,900 m (8,200–12,800 ft).

== Behaviour and ecology ==
=== Diet ===
It feeds on invertebrates, such as beetles.
