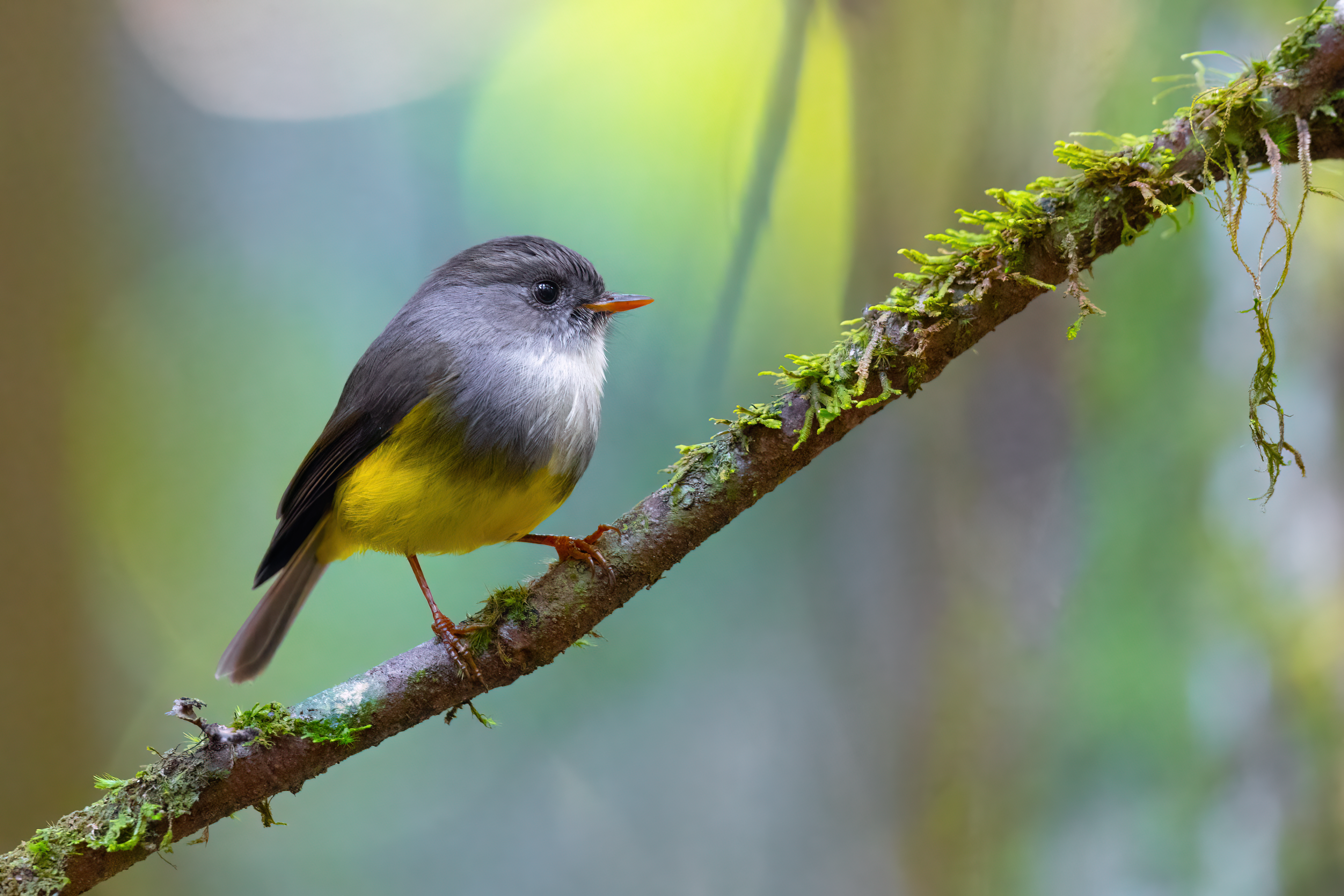

Conservation status
- Least Concern (IUCN 3.1)

Scientific classification
- Kingdom: Animalia
- Phylum: Chordata
- Class: Aves
- Order: Passeriformes
- Family: Petroicidae
- Genus: Cryptomicroeca; Christidis, Irestedt, Rowe, Boles & Norman, 2012
- Species: C. flaviventris

Binomial name
- Cryptomicroeca flaviventris (Sharpe, 1903)

Synonyms
- Eopsaltria flaviventris; Microeca flaviventris

= Yellow-bellied flyrobin =

Species of songbird native to New Caledonia

The yellow-bellied flyrobin (Cryptomicroeca flaviventris) is a species of passerine bird in the Australasian robin family Petroicidae. It is the only species in the genus Cryptomicroeca. The yellow-bellied flyrobin is endemic to New Caledonia, where it occurs on the island of Grande Terre. It occupies a range of habitats, including dry lowlands, woodland, Pinus and Pandanus forest, and humid forest from sea level up to 1,525 m (5,000 ft).

== Taxonomy ==
The yellow-bellied flyrobin was described in 1860 by the French ornithologists, Jules Verreaux and Oeillet des Murs, from a specimen collected in New Caledonia. They coined the binomial name Eopsaltria flavigastra. The English ornithologist, Richard Bowdler Sharpe, realised that the specific epithet was preoccupied, and in 1903 he proposed flaviventris as a replacement. The species was long considered one of the yellow robins of the genus Eopsaltria. However, a 2009 genetic study showed it to be nested within the flyrobin genus Microeca, and hence it was moved to Microeca, and its common name was changed from yellow-bellied robin to yellow-bellied flyrobin in the online list of world birds maintained by Frank Gill and David Donsker on behalf of the International Ornithological Committee (IOC). A more comprehensive genetic study of the family Petroicidae, published in 2011, found that the yellow-bellied flyrobin was divergent from the other members of Microeca, and instead was sister to a clade containing the Microeca and the torrent flyrobin. The yellow-bellied flyrobin is now placed as the only species in the genus Cryptomicroeca that was introduced in 2012.

== Description ==
The yellow-bellied robin is a medium-sized Australasian robin, 14–15 cm (5.5–5.9 in) in length and weighing around 12 g (0.42 oz). The plumage is similar to members of the genus Eopsaltria: dark olive-grey back, tail and wings, grey head and chest with a slightly lighter throat, and yellow belly and rump. The legs are grey.
