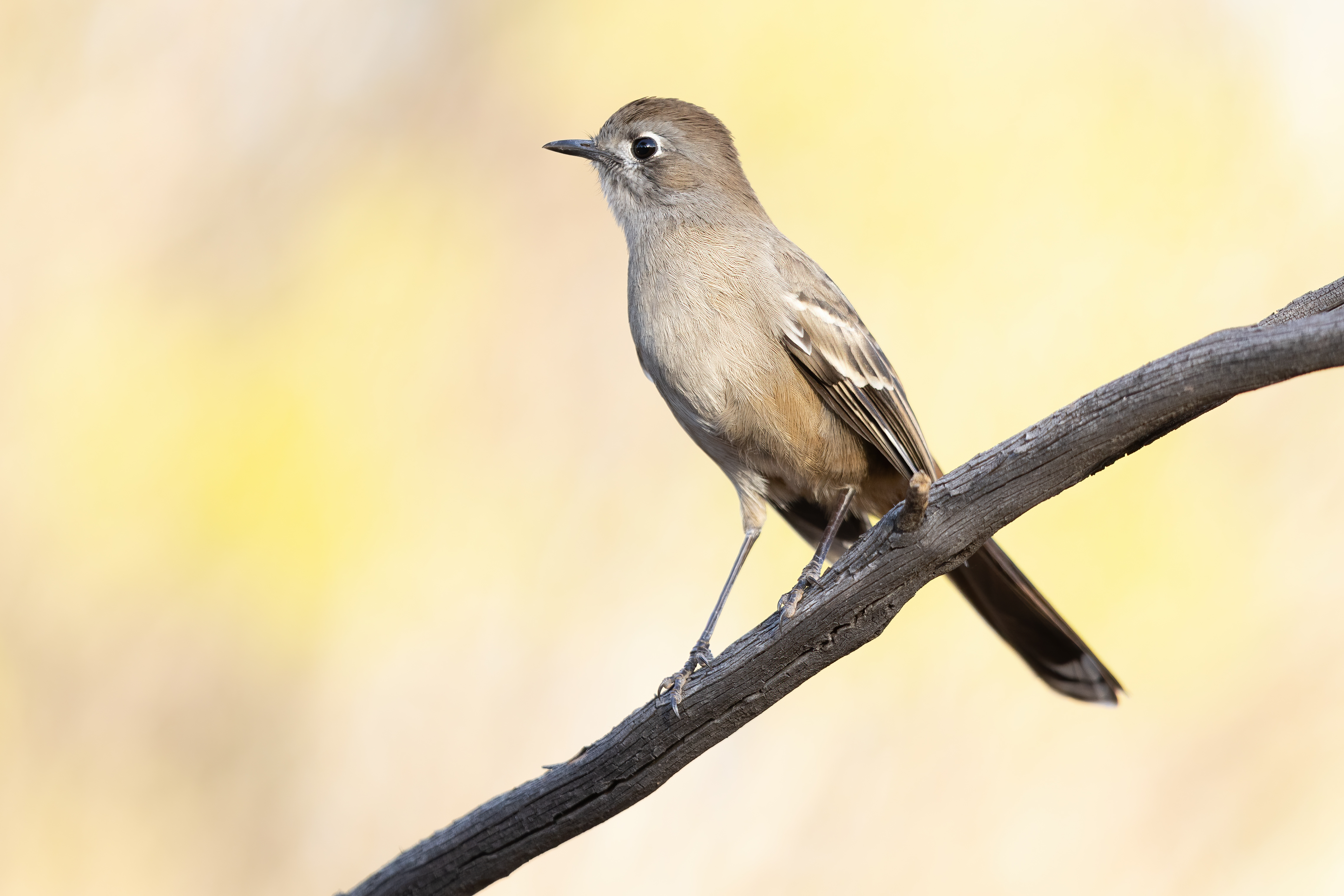

Conservation status
- Least Concern (IUCN 3.1)

Scientific classification
- Kingdom: Animalia
- Phylum: Chordata
- Class: Aves
- Order: Passeriformes
- Family: Petroicidae
- Genus: Drymodes
- Species: D. brunneopygia

Binomial name
- Drymodes brunneopygia Gould, 1841

= Southern scrub robin =

Species of bird

The southern scrub robin (Drymodes brunneopygia) is a species of bird in the family Petroicidae. It is endemic to Australia, where it occurs in mallee and heathland in the semi-arid southern parts of the continent. Its range includes several disjoint regions from central New South Wales through western Victoria and southern South Australia, through to the southwestern area of Western Australia.

== Taxonomy ==
The southern scrub robin was formally described in 1841 by the English ornithologist John Gould under the current binomial name Drymodes brunneopygia. Gould noted that the bird was found near the Murray River in South Australia. The specific epithet combines the Modern Latin brunneus, meaning "brown", with the Ancient Greek -pugios, meaning "-rumped". The species is monotypic: no subspecies are recognised.

== Description ==
It is a relatively dull and large robin, adults being around 19–20 centimetres (7.5–7.9 in) in length, of which around a third is the tail feathers. Most of the plumage is grey, except for a dullish red tail and patterned black-and-white wings. The legs are unusually long for a passerine, and are frequently used to hop through the dense heathland that forms the bird's habitat, where it searches for insects and other small invertebrates.

== Behaviour ==
=== Breeding ===
The birds breed between July and December. The nest is built of twigs on the ground and is lined with twigs, grass and bark. Unusually for a passerine, the southern scrub robin lays only a single egg. It is grey-green in colour for camouflage amongst the sclerophyllous flora that forms its habitat. The egg is incubated for sixteen days. The young leave the nest after 10–13 days but continue to be fed by both parents.

== Status ==
The species is listed under the IUCN Red List of Threatened Species as a species of 'Least concern'. In New South Wales it is listed as Vulnerable under the Biodiversity Conservation Act 2016.
