= E. rubra =

E. rubra may refer to:

- Eos rubra, the red lory, a parrot species
- Eugerygone rubra, the garnet robin, a bird species
