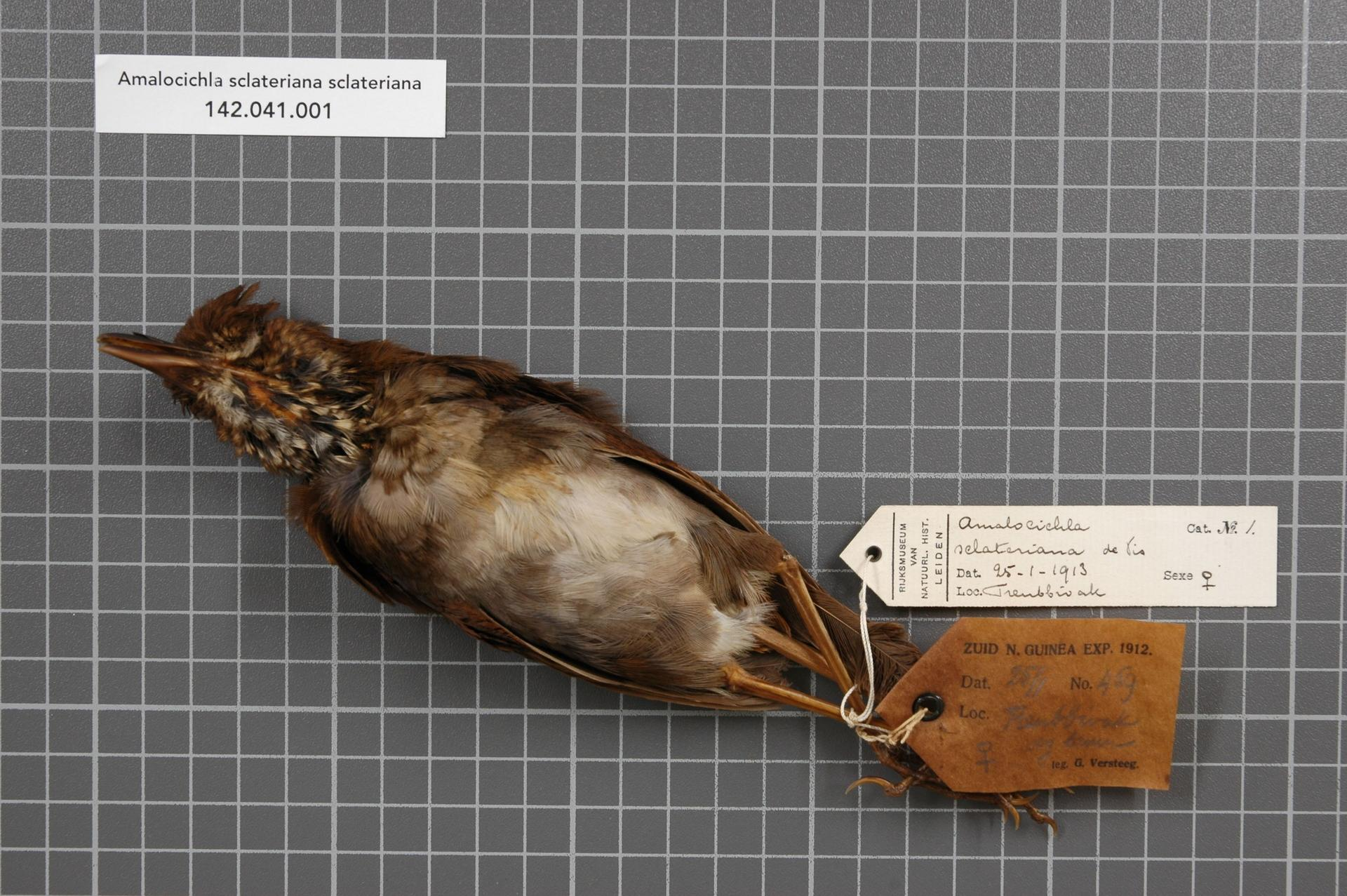

Scientific classification
- Kingdom: Animalia
- Phylum: Chordata
- Class: Aves
- Order: Passeriformes
- Family: Petroicidae
- Genus: Amalocichla; De Vis, 1892

Type species
- Amalocichla sclateriana De Vis, 1892

Species
- 2, see text

= Amalocichla =

Genus of birds

Amalocichla is a genus of bird in the family Petroicidae that are found in New Guinea.

== Species ==
The genus contains the following two species:

Image	Scientific name	Common name	Distribution
	Amalocichla sclateriana	Greater ground robin	New Guinea.
	Amalocichla incerta	Lesser ground robin	New Guinea.
