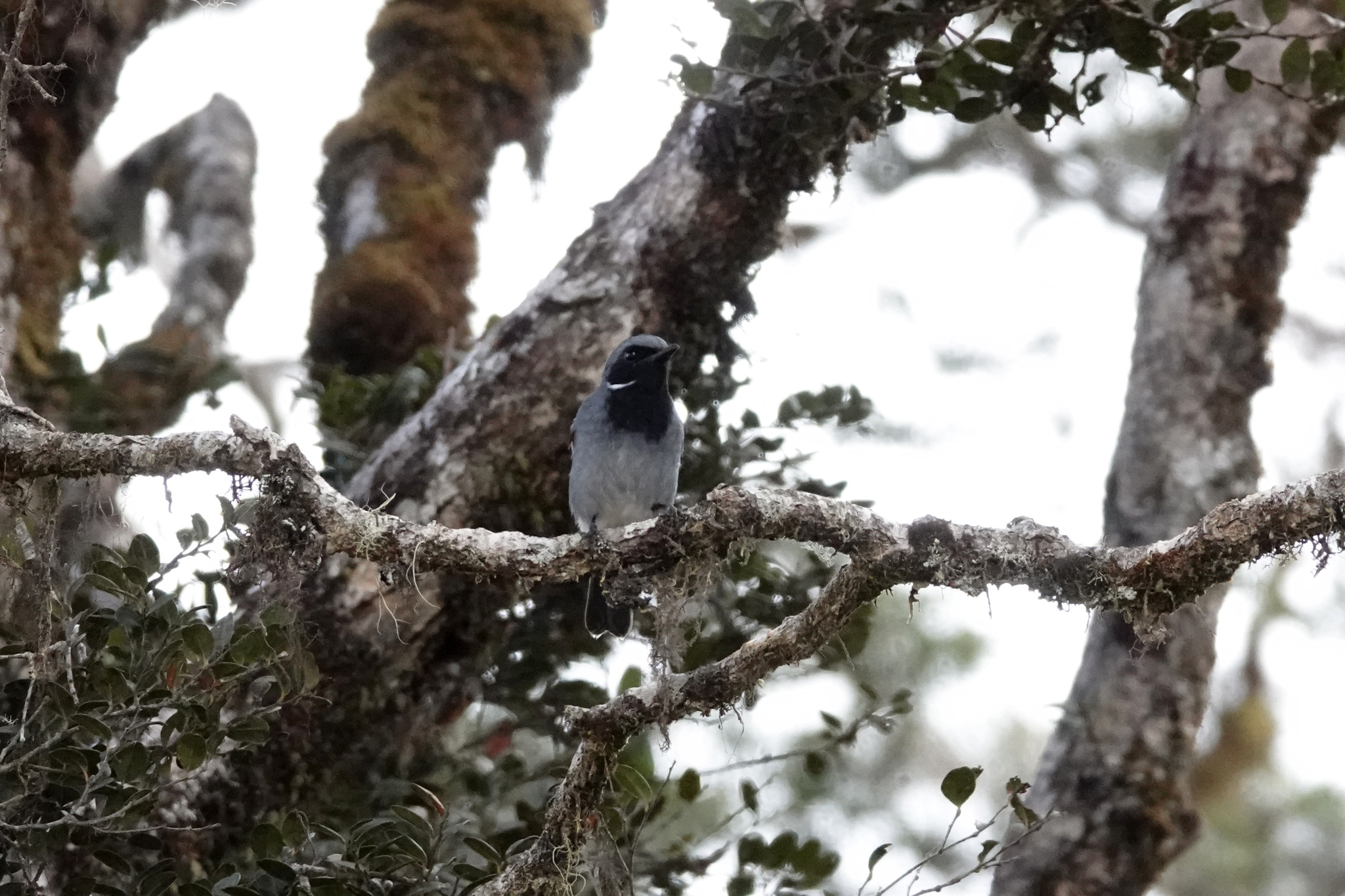
- Illustration by Keulemans, 1879

Conservation status
- Least Concern (IUCN 3.1)

Scientific classification
- Kingdom: Animalia
- Phylum: Chordata
- Class: Aves
- Order: Passeriformes
- Family: Petroicidae
- Genus: Plesiodryas; Mathews, 1920
- Species: P. albonotata

Binomial name
- Plesiodryas albonotata (Salvadori, 1875)

Synonyms
- Poecilodryas albonotata

= Black-throated robin =

Species of songbird native to New Guinea

The black-throated robin (Plesiodryas albonotata) is a species of passerine bird in the Australisian robin family Petroicidae. It is found on the island of New Guinea. Its natural habitat is subtropical or tropical moist montane forests at 1,150–2,750 metres above sea-level.

== Taxonomy ==
The black-throated robin was described by the Italian zoologist, Tommaso Salvadori, in 1875, from a specimen collected in the Arfak Mountains on the island of New Guinea. He coined the binomial name Megalestes albonotatus. It was moved to the genus Poecilodryas by the English zoologist, Richard Bowdler Sharpe, in 1879. A 2011 molecular phylogenetic study found that the black-throated robin was the most divergent member of Poecilodryas. The species is now the only species placed in the resurrected genus Plesiodryas that had been introduced by the Australian ornithologist, Gregory Mathews, in 1820.

== Description ==
Measuring 18 to 19 cm (7.1 to 7.5 in), the black-throated robin has a grey-black face, throat and upper breast with a grey crown and nape, and a white diagonal mark on the neck. The upperparts are blue-grey, and the underparts grey to white over the abdomen and under the tail coverts. The bill and legs are black, and the eyes are dark brown. The plumage is reminiscent of a cuckoo-shrike, but the white neck marking is diagnostic.

The black-throated robin is found predominantly in rainforests along the central highlands of New Guinea, from the Bird's Head Peninsula in the west to the Huon Peninsula in the east, at altitudes from 1,800 to 2,750 m (5,900 to 9,000 ft). Within the rainforest, it is found singly in the understory or on the ground. It is insectivorous, and hunts by gleaning.
