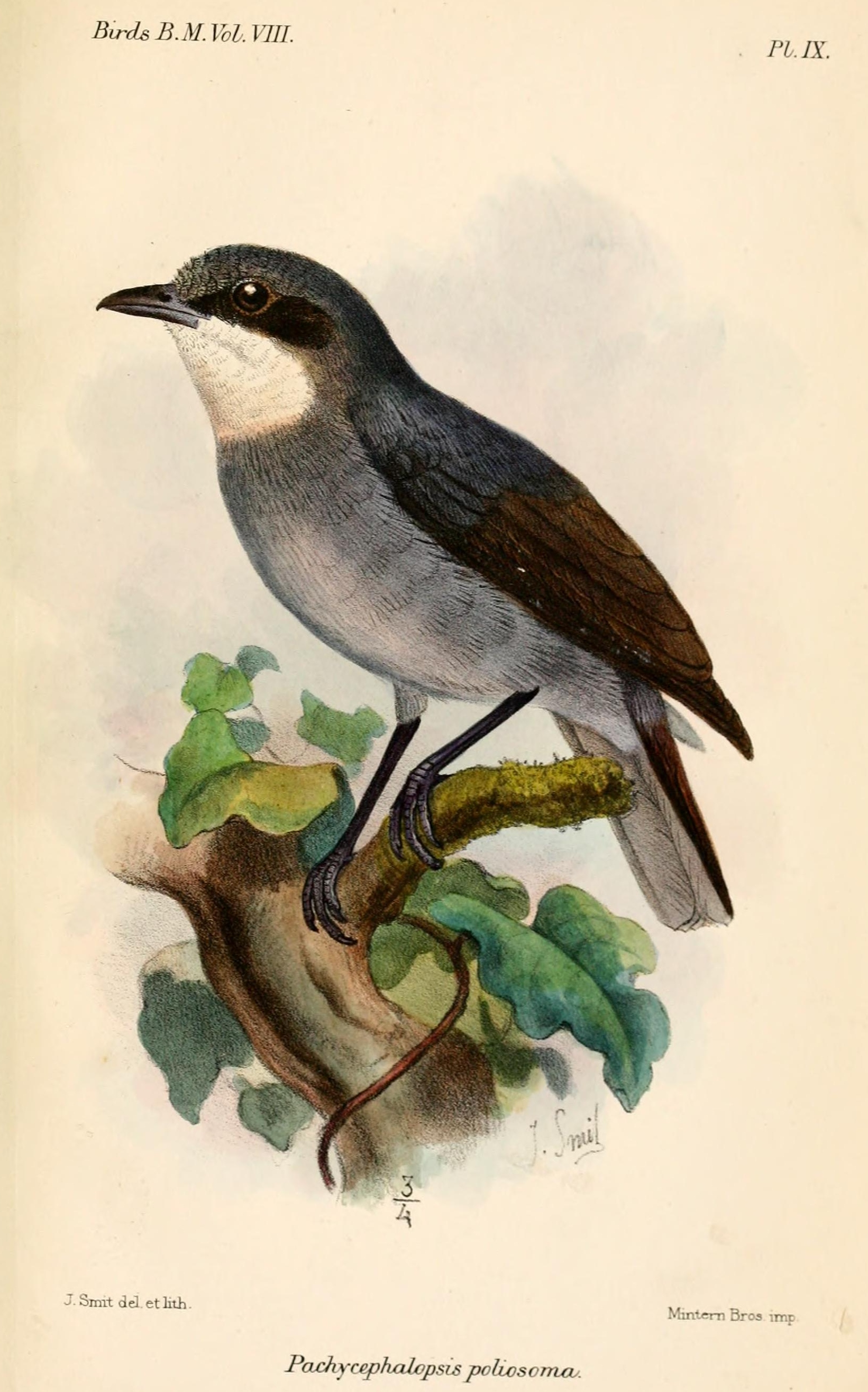
- White-eyed robin (Pachycephalopsis poliosoma)

Scientific classification
- Kingdom: Animalia
- Phylum: Chordata
- Class: Aves
- Order: Passeriformes
- Family: Petroicidae
- Genus: Pachycephalopsis; Salvadori, 1879

Type species
- Pachycephala hattamensis Meyer, 1874

Species
- 2; see text

= Pachycephalopsis =

Genus of birds

Pachycephalopsis is a genus of birds in the Australasian robin family Petroicidae that are found in New Guinea.

== Species ==
The genus contains the following two species:

Image	Common name	Scientific name	Distribution
	Green-backed robin	Pachycephalopsis hattamensis	New Guinea.
	White-eyed robin	Pachycephalopsis poliosoma	Indonesia and Papua New Guinea.
