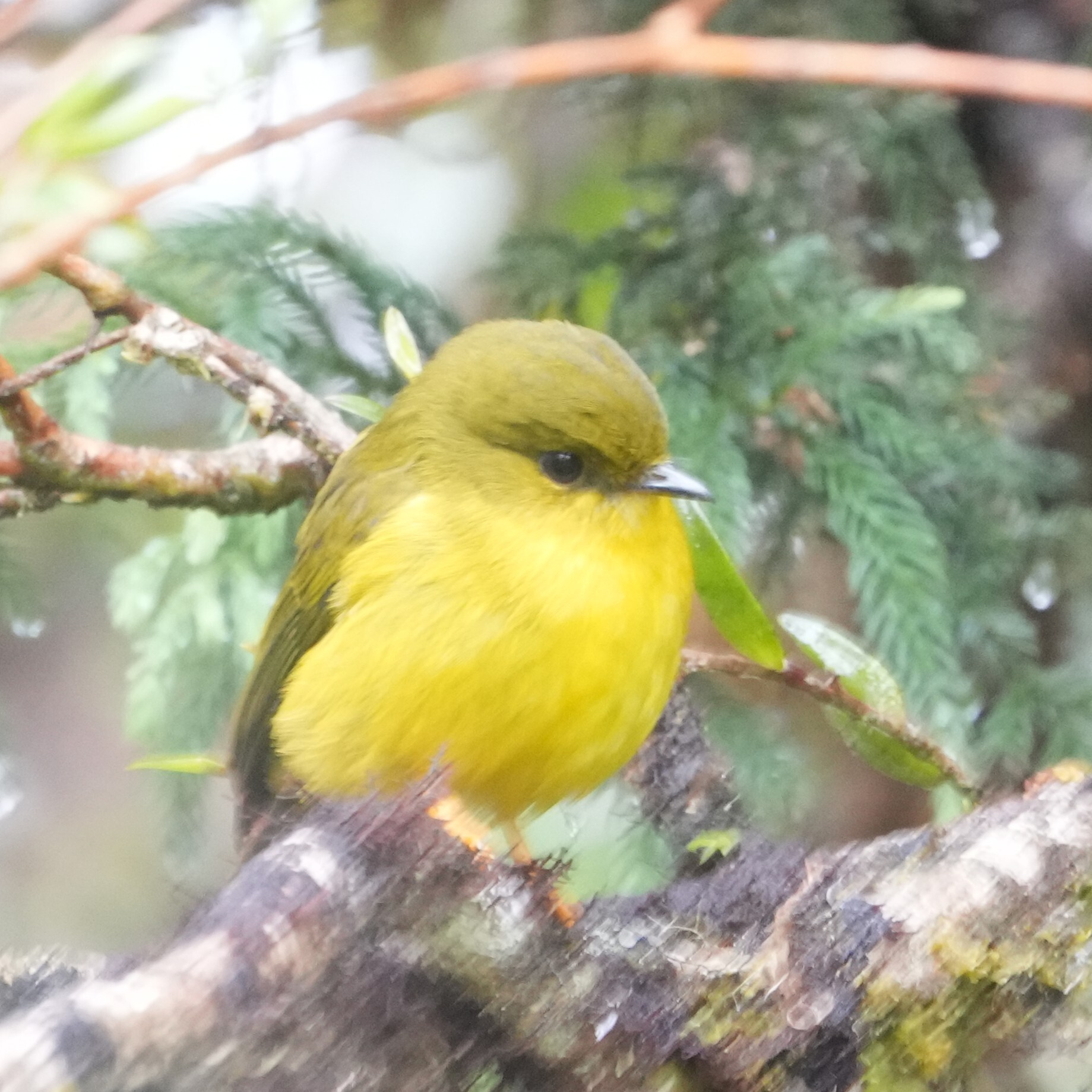

Conservation status
- Least Concern (IUCN 3.1)

Scientific classification
- Kingdom: Animalia
- Phylum: Chordata
- Class: Aves
- Order: Passeriformes
- Family: Petroicidae
- Genus: Devioeca; Mathews, 1925
- Species: D. papuana

Binomial name
- Devioeca papuana (Meyer, A.B., 1875)

Synonyms
- Microeca papuana

= Canary flyrobin =

Species of songbird native to New Guinea

The canary flyrobin (Devioeca papuana), also known as the Papuan flycatcher, canary robin, canary flycatcher, or montane flycatcher, is a species of bird in the family Petroicidae. It is found in New Guinea. Its natural habitat is subtropical or tropical moist montane forests with elevations from 1,100–3,500 m (3,609–11,483 ft). Currently, its population is believed to be stable.

The canary flyrobin was described by the German ornithologist, Adolf Bernhard Meyer, in 1875, from a specimen collected in the Arfak Mountains on the island of New Guinea. He coined the binomial name Microeca papuana. It was moved to the resurrected genus Devioeca, based on the results of a molecular phylogenetic study published in 2011. The genus Devioeca was originally introduced by the Australian ornithologist Gregory Mathews in 1925.
