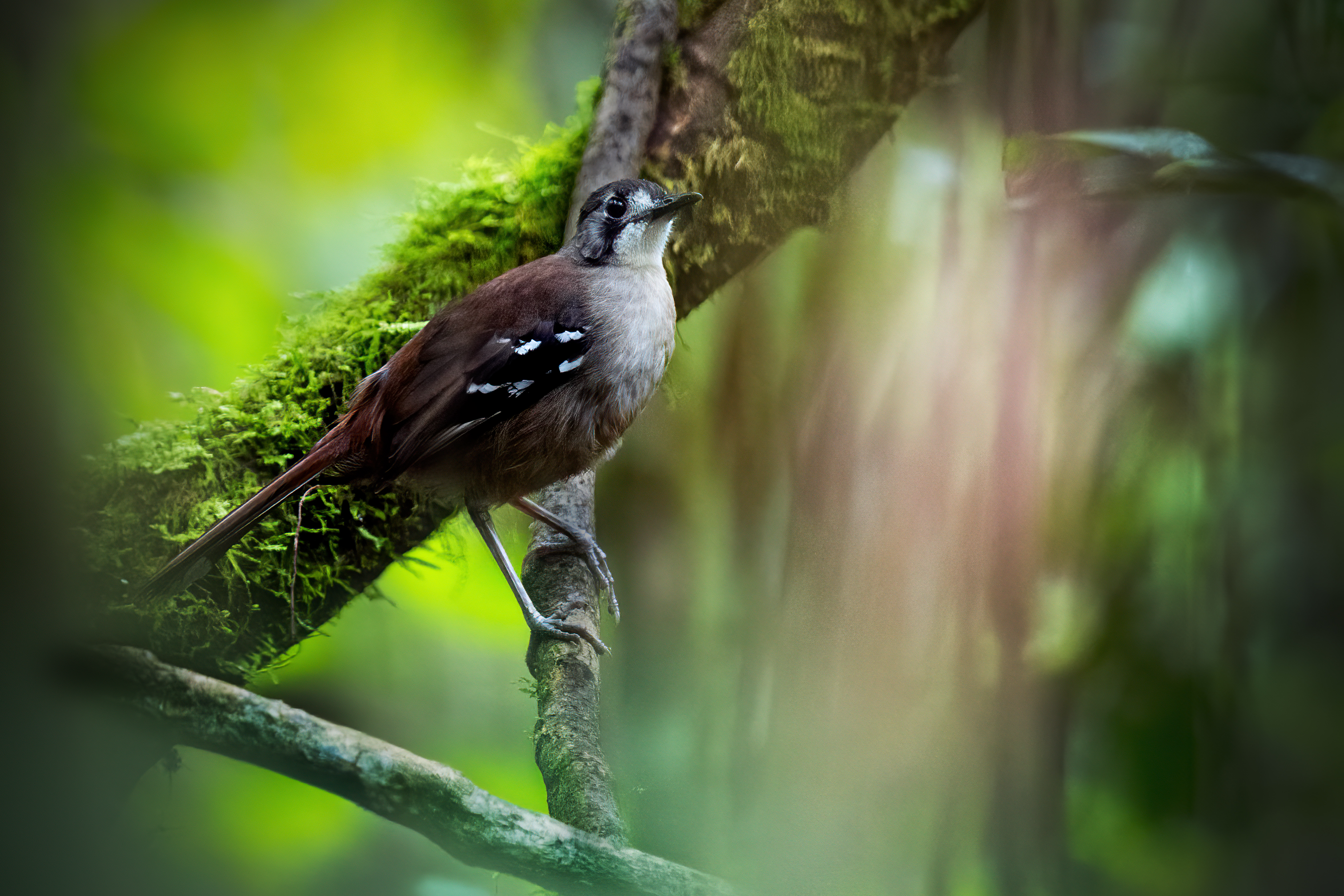

Conservation status
- Least Concern (IUCN 3.1)

Scientific classification
- Kingdom: Animalia
- Phylum: Chordata
- Class: Aves
- Order: Passeriformes
- Family: Petroicidae
- Genus: Drymodes
- Species: D. beccarii

Binomial name
- Drymodes beccarii Salvadori, 1876

= Papuan scrub robin =

Species of bird

The Papuan scrub robin or New Guinea scrub robin (Drymodes beccarii) is a species of bird in the family Petroicidae. It was found to be genetically distinct from the northern scrub robin, with which it was formerly considered conspecific.

It is found in New Guinea and the Aru Islands. There are three subspecies.

- D. b. beccarii (Salvadori, 1876) – Arfak and Wandammen Mountains, western New Guinea
- D. b. brevirostris (De Vis, 1897) – southern and south-eastern New Guinea with the Aru Islands
- D. b. nigriceps (Rand, 1940) – northern New Guinea eastwards to Telefomin, with the Torricelli Mountains and Adelbert Range
