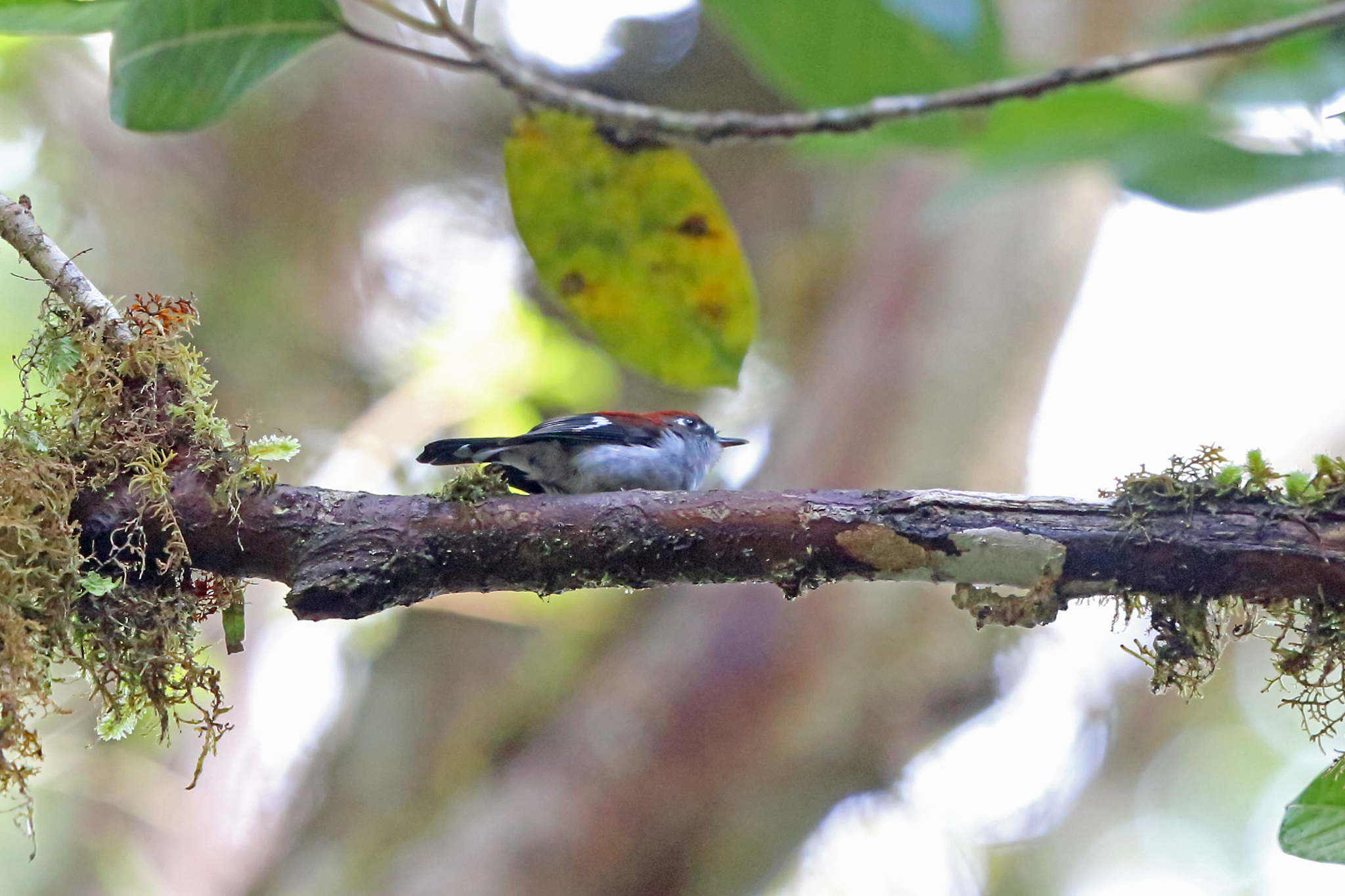

Conservation status
- Least Concern (IUCN 3.1)

Scientific classification
- Kingdom: Animalia
- Phylum: Chordata
- Class: Aves
- Order: Passeriformes
- Family: Petroicidae
- Genus: Eugerygone; Finsch, 1901
- Species: E. rubra

Binomial name
- Eugerygone rubra (Sharpe, 1879)

= Garnet robin =

Species of songbird native to New Guinea

The garnet robin (Eugerygone rubra) is a species of bird in the family Petroicidae. It is monotypic within the genus Eugerygone. It is found in New Guinea, where its natural habitat is subtropical or tropical moist montane forests.

== Taxonomy ==
The garnet robin was described by the English ornithologist, Richard Bowdler Sharpe, in 1879, from a specimen collected in the Arfak Mountains on the island of New Guinea. He coined the binomial name Pseudogerygone rubra. It was moved to the genus Eugerygone by the German naturalist, Otto Finsch, in 1901.
