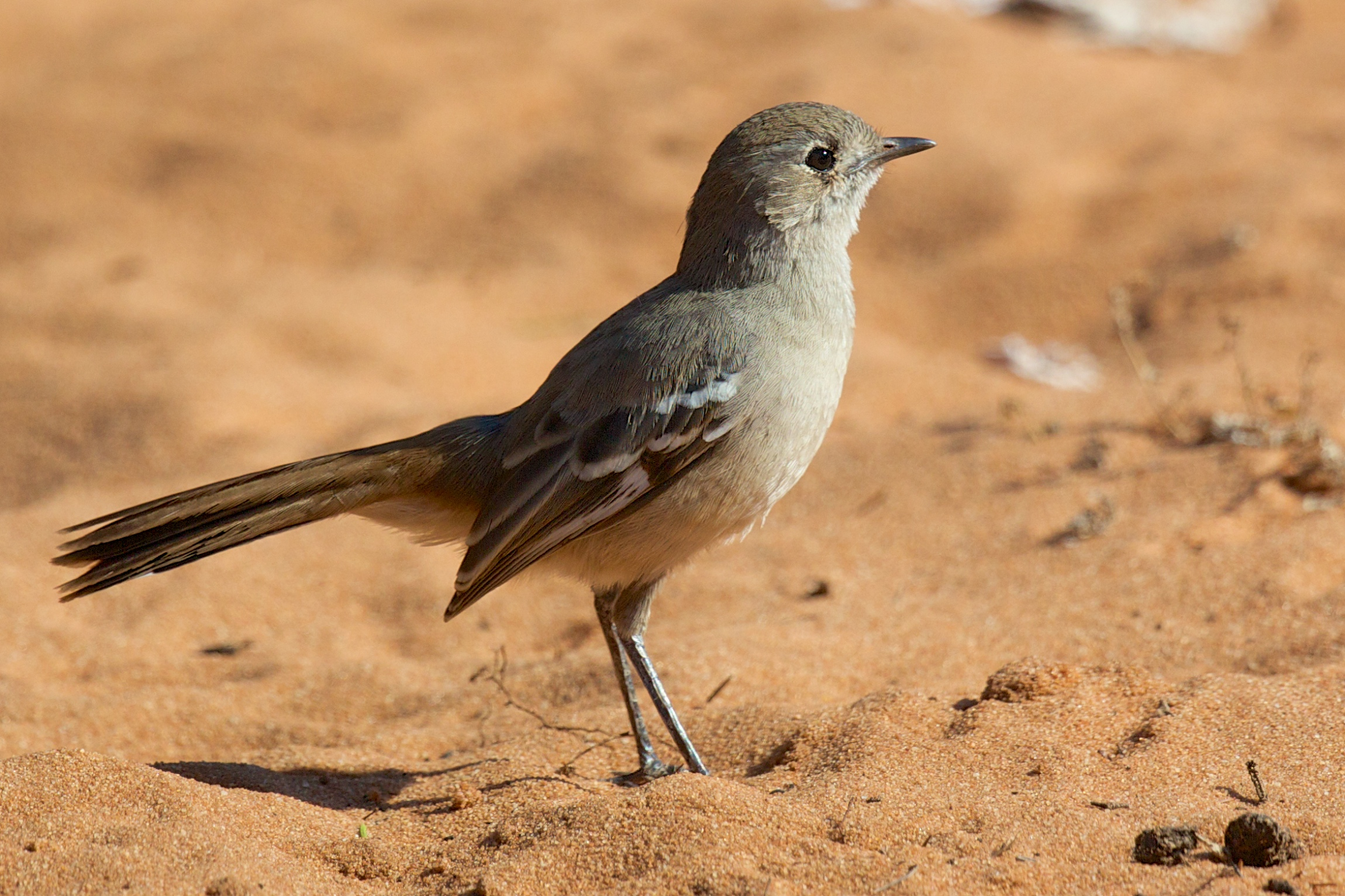
- Southern scrub robin (Drymodes brunneopygia)

Scientific classification
- Kingdom: Animalia
- Phylum: Chordata
- Class: Aves
- Order: Passeriformes
- Family: Petroicidae
- Genus: Drymodes; Gould, 1841

Type species
- Drymodes brunneopygia Gould, 1841

Species
- 3; see text

= Drymodes =

Genus of birds

Drymodes is a genus of birds in the family Petroicidae. It was traditionally held to have two species, but molecular and behavioural differences led to the split of the New Guinea populations from the northern scrub robin. The paper by Les Christidis and colleagues was published in 2011 and the IOC adopted the split in 2015:

== Species ==
The genus contains the following three species:

Image	Scientific name	Common name	Distribution
	Drymodes brunneopygia	Southern scrub robin	Australia
	Drymodes superciliaris	Northern scrub robin	Northern Territory of Australia
	Drymodes beccarii	Papuan scrub robin	New Guinea and the Aru Islands
