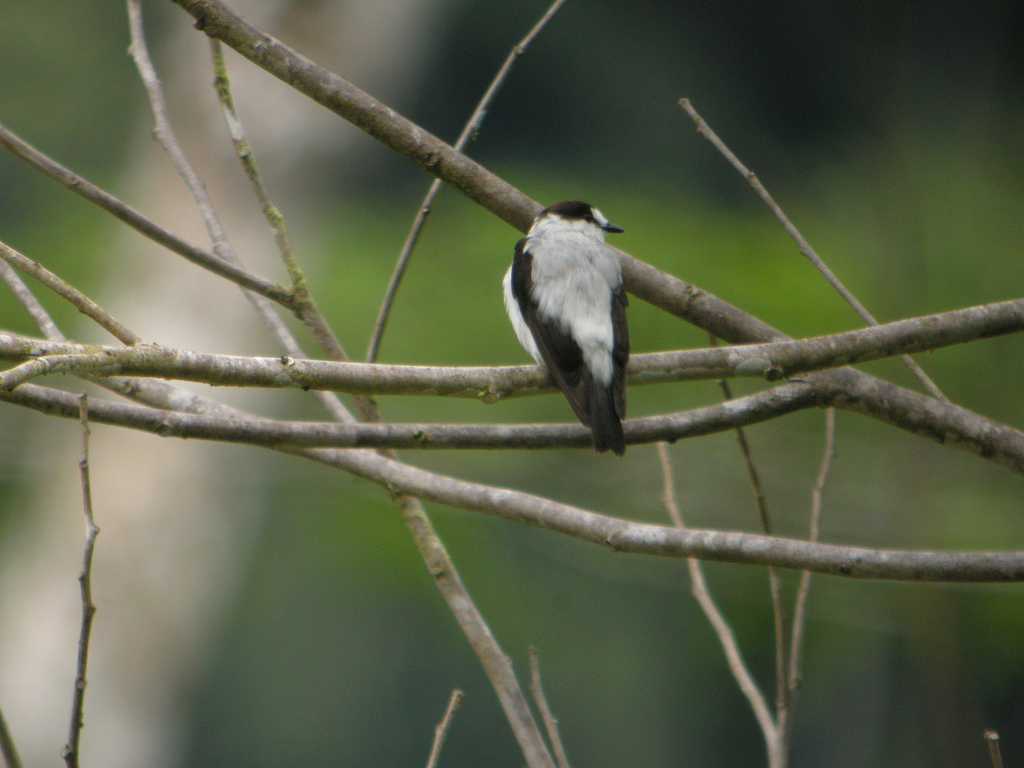

Conservation status
- Least Concern (IUCN 3.1)

Scientific classification
- Kingdom: Animalia
- Phylum: Chordata
- Class: Aves
- Order: Passeriformes
- Family: Petroicidae
- Genus: Monachella; Salvadori, 1874
- Species: M. muelleriana

Binomial name
- Monachella muelleriana (Schlegel, 1871)

= Torrent flyrobin =

Species of songbird native to New Guinea

The torrent flyrobin (Monachella muelleriana) is a species of passerine bird in the Australasian robin family Petroicidae. It is also known as the torrent robin.

It is placed in the monotypic genus Monachella. The species occurs in New Guinea and on the island of New Britain in the Bismarck Archipelago. There are two subspecies: the nominate subspecies occurs in the New Guinea Highlands and M. m. coultasi in the New Britain montane rain forests.

As suggested by its name, the torrent flyrobin's preferred habitat is fast moving streams and rivers with protruding boulders.
