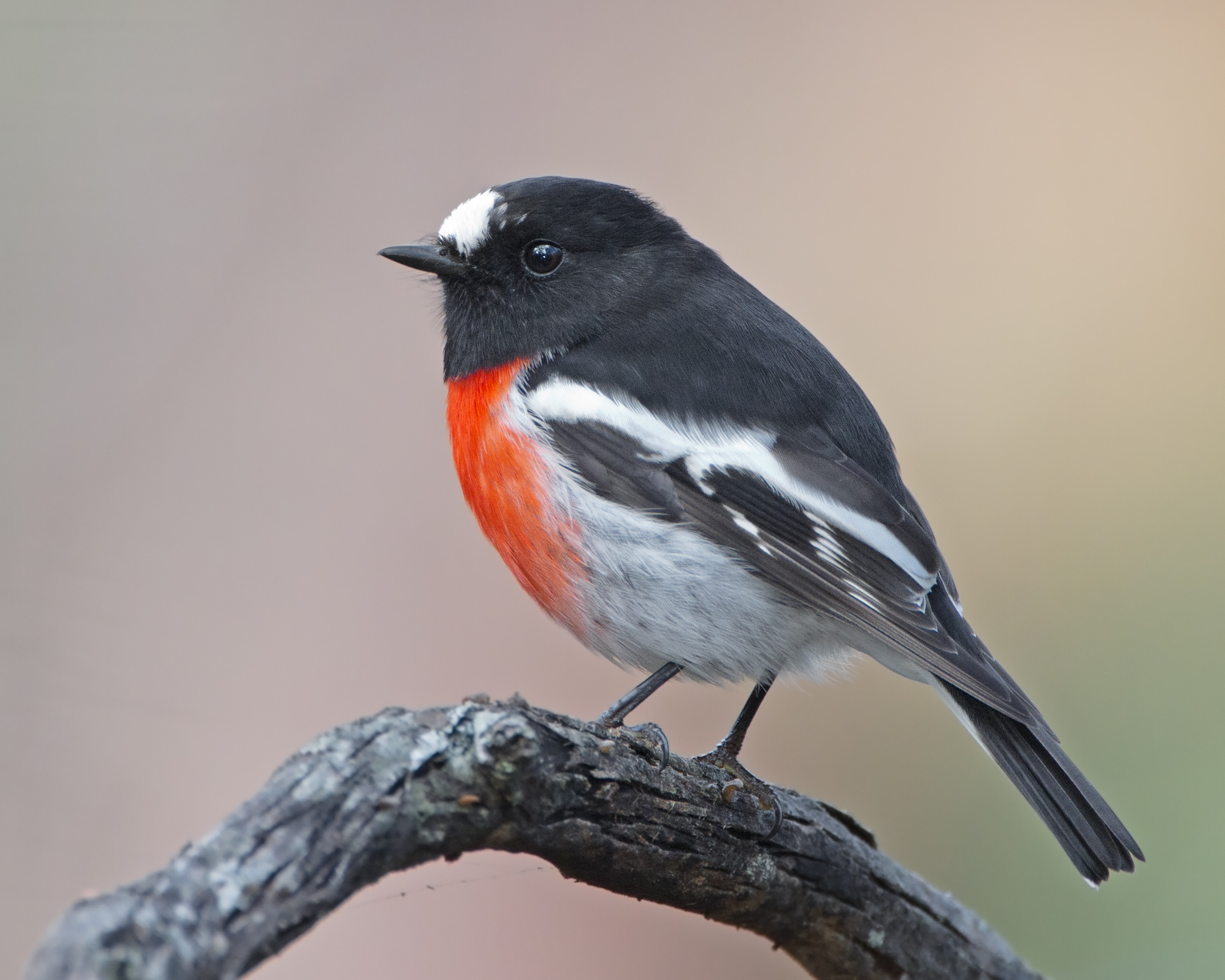
- Scarlet robin, Knocklofty Reserve, Hobart, Tasmania

Scientific classification
- Kingdom: Animalia
- Phylum: Chordata
- Class: Aves
- Order: Passeriformes
- Infraorder: Passerides
- Family: Petroicidae; Newton, 1888

Genera
- See text.
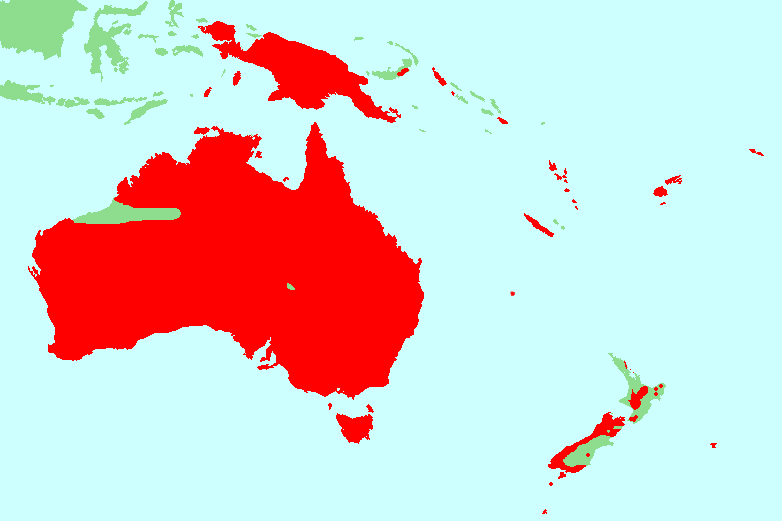
- Global range (In red)

= Australasian robin =

Family of birds

The bird family Petroicidae includes 51 species in 19 genera. All are endemic to Australasia: New Guinea, Australia, New Zealand and numerous Pacific Islands as far east as Samoa. For want of an accurate common name, the family is often called the Australasian robins. Within the family species are known variously as robins, scrub-robins and flyrobins. They are only distantly related to the European robin of Europe, north Africa and western Asia, a member of family Muscicapidae.

== Characteristics ==
Most species have a compact build with a large, rounded head, a short, straight bill, and rounded wingtips. They occupy a wide range of wooded habitats, from subalpine to tropical rainforest, and mangrove swamps to semi-arid scrubland. All are primarily insectivorous, although a few supplement their diet with seeds. Hunting is mostly by perch and pounce, a favoured tactic being to cling sideways onto a treetrunk and scan the ground below without moving.

Social organisation is usually centered on long-term pair-bonds and small family groups. Most members of the subfamily Eopsaltrinae practice cooperative breeding, with all family members helping defend a territory and feed nestlings.

Nests are cup-shaped, usually constructed by the female, and often placed in a vertical fork of a tree or shrub. Many species are expert at adding moss, bark or lichen to the outside of the nest as camouflage, making it very difficult to spot, even when it is in a seemingly prominent location.

== Taxonomy and systematics ==
The Australasian robin family was first introduced in 1888, as a subfamily with the spelling Petroecinae, by the English ornithologist Alfred Newton.

Although named after true robins, the Australian robins, along with many other insect-eating birds, were originally classified as flycatchers in a huge family Muscicapidae. They were also classified for a time in the whistler family Pachycephalidae, before being placed in their own family Petroicidae, or Eopsaltridae.

The family Petroicidae is a member of the infraorder Passerides which also includes the parvorders Sylviida, Muscicapida and Passerida. It is most closely related to the families Eupetidae (Rail-babbler), Chaetopidae (Rockjumper) and Picathartidae (Rockfowl).

== Classification ==
A comprehensive review, including an analysis of the osteological characters, by Schodde and Mason in 1999 illustrated three groupings, classified as subfamilies below: Testing of mitochondrial and nuclear DNA revealed some changes, and proposed sinking of Tregellasia into Eopsaltria as the white-breasted robin's closest relatives appear to be the two taxa of Tregellasia.

The following genus-level cladogram is based on a molecular phylogenetic study by Les Christidis and collaborators published in 2011. The genera shown and the number of species is from the AviList taxonomy.

- Petroicidae
  - - - Petroicinae
        - Eugerygone
        - Petroica
    - - Amalocichlinae
        Amalocichla
      - Pachycephalopsinae
        Pachycephalopsis
  - - - Microecinae
        - Devioeca
        - Kempiella
        - - Cryptomicroeca
          - - Microeca
            - Monachella
    - - Drymodinae
        Drymodes
      - Eopsaltriinae
        - - Heteromyias
          - - Plesiodryas
            - Poecilodryas
        - - Melanodryas
          - Eopsaltria

The family contains 51 species divided into 16 genera and 6 subfamilies:

- Eopsaltriinae
  - Eopsaltria (6 species)
  - Melanodryas (7 species)
  - Poecilodryas (4 species)
  - Plesiodryas (monotypic) – black-throated robin
  - Heteromyias (3 species)
- Drymodinae
  - Drymodes (3 species)
- Microecinae
  - Microeca (3 species)
  - Monachella (monotypic) – torrent flyrobin
  - Cryptomicroeca (monotypic) – yellow-bellied flyrobin
  - Kempiella (2 species)
  - Devioeca (monotypic) – canary flyrobin
- Petroicinae
  - Eugerygone (monotypic) – garnet robin
  - Petroica (14 species)
- Pachycephalopsinae
  - Pachycephalopsis (2 species)
- Amalocichlinae
  - Amalocichla (2 species)
