= Geranium kauaiense =

Conservation status
- Critically Imperiled (NatureServe)

Scientific classification
- Kingdom: Plantae
- Clade: Tracheophytes
- Clade: Angiosperms
- Clade: Eudicots
- Clade: Rosids
- Order: Geraniales
- Family: Geraniaceae
- Genus: Geranium
- Species: G. kauaiense

Binomial name
- Geranium kauaiense (Rock) H.St.John

Species of flowering plant

A close up of Kauai Geranium (Geranium kauaiense) in the United States

Geranium kauaiense is a rare species of geranium known by the common name Kauai geranium. It is endemic to Hawaii, where it is known only from the island of Kauai. It was federally listed as an endangered species in 2010. Like other Hawaiian geraniums, this plant is known as hinahina and nohoanu.

This plant is a subshrub with stems up to a meter long. The inflorescence is a cyme of 3 or 4 flowers with purple-striped white petals.

This plant grows in the wet forests and bogs of Alakai Wilderness Preserve on Kauai, where there are about 140 plants remaining. There are also three plants at the summit of Mount Waialeale, one of the rainiest spots on earth.

The main threat to this species is the degradation of its habitat feral pigs, which may also feed on the plant. Fences have been erected around patches of bog habitat to protect it from the pigs. Non-native species of plants also have invaded the habitat, including Juncus planifolius and Andropogon virginicus.
