= Alakaʻi Wilderness Preserve =

Wet forest on the Hawaiian island of Kauaʻi, United States

- IUCN category V (protected landscape/seascape)
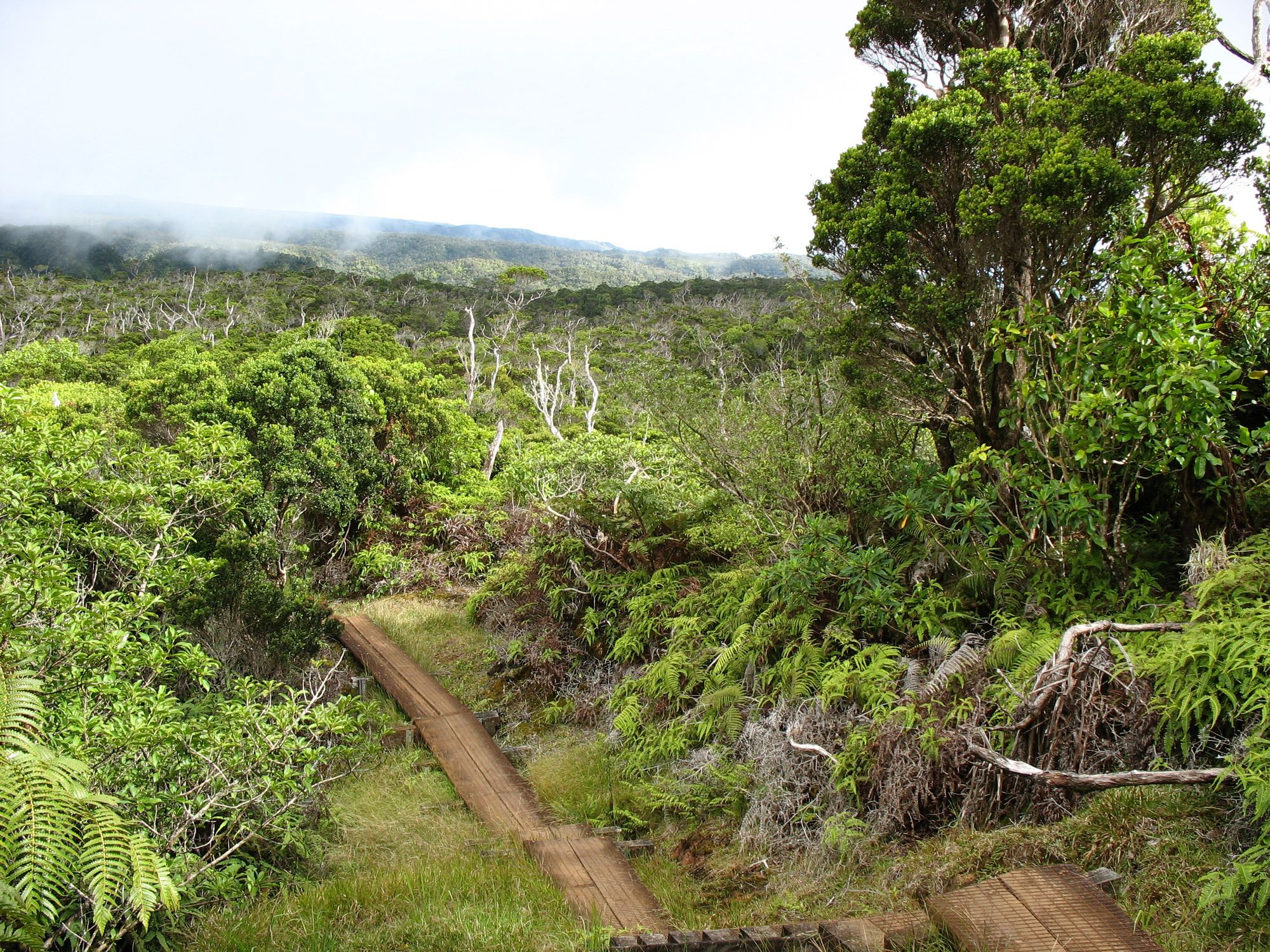

- Location within Hawaii
- Location: Kauai, Hawaii, US
- Nearest city: Waimea, Hawaii
- Coordinates: 22°06′30″N 159°33′30″W
- Area: 9,000 acres (36 km^{2})
- Established: 1981
- Governing body: Hawaii Division of Forestry and Wildlife

The Alakaʻi Wilderness Preserve, popularly known as Alakaʻi Swamp, is a montane wet forest on the Hawaiian island of Kauaʻi. Although the preserve is home to alpine bogs, it is not a true swamp. It is located on a plateau near Mount Waiʻaleʻale, one of the wettest spots on Earth. Due to its unique combination of high elevation and climate, the Alakaʻi Swamp harbors a large number of endangered endemic species that are only found in this area and whose population has been dramatically declining over the last decades. It is designated as a IUCN protected area.

== Geology ==
The Alakai swamp is located at the center of a plateau formed by the activity of the shield volcano. Large flows of basalts and pyroclastics accumulated over time in horizontal beds within the caldera. The resulting rock formations beneath the Alakaʻi and Waiʻaleʻale area are poorly permeable to water.

== Biodiversity ==
Among the 48 endangered species endemic to Kaua’i, 21 are only found in the montane wet ecosystem that includes the Alakaʻi Swamp and the summit of Mount Waiʻaleʻale.

=== Fauna ===
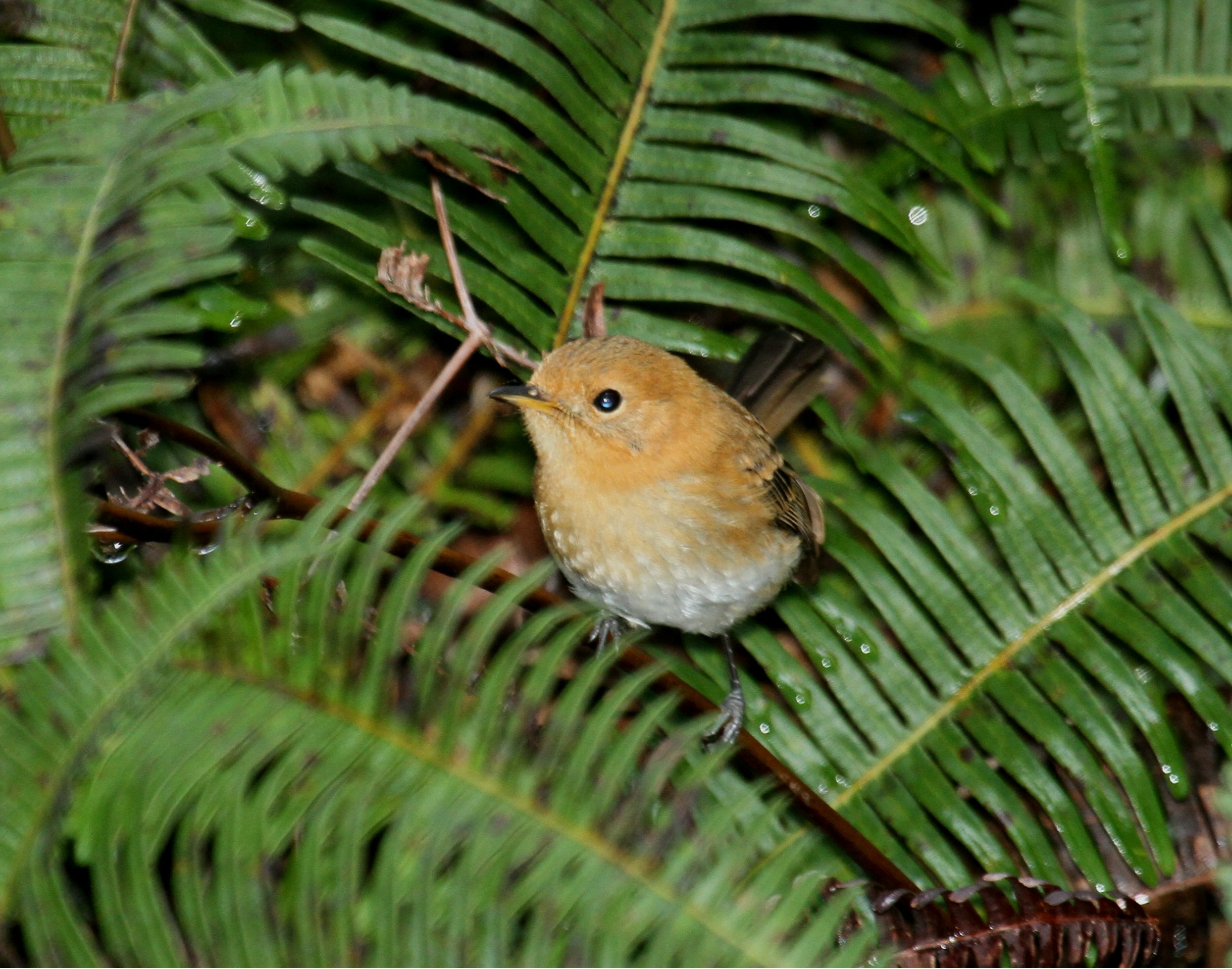
Kaua’i ‘Elepaio in the Alakaʻi Wilderness.

The Alakaʻi Wilderness is home to all of the six extant species of Kauai's endemic birds:

- ‘Akeke’e (Loxops caeruleirostris)
- ‘Akikiki (Oreomystis bairdi)
- ‘Anianiau (Magumma parva)
- Kaua’i ‘Amakihi (Chlorodrepanis stejnegeri)
- Kaua’i ‘Elepaio (Chasiempis sclateri)
- Puaiohi (Myadestes palmeri)

Two other forest bird species that are found in the preserve, ‘Apapane and ‘I’iwi, also occur on other islands of Hawaii. At least five native forest bird species have gone extinct on the island and the remaining species have retreated to higher elevation in this protected area. Habitat loss and diseases carried by introduced mosquitoes (in particular avian malaria and avipoxvirus) have decimated the endemic bird population and further restricted their range. While the honeycreeper population has continued to decline in the area, the Kaua’i ‘Elepaio has shown resistance to avian malaria.

Two of the forest bird species that were declared extinct in 2021—the Kauaʻi ʻōʻō (Moho braccatus) and the Kāmaʻo (Myadestes myadestinus, once the most common bird on Kauaʻi)—were sighted for the last time in the Alakaʻi Wilderness in the 1980s. A 2002 study published in the Proceedings of the National Academy of Sciences compared the resilience of three ecosystems critical for the conservation of the remaining endemic bird species in Hawaii—the Hakalau National Wildlife Refuge on Big Island, the Hanawi Forest on Maui, and the Alakaʻi Swamp on Kaua’i. The study concluded that, of these three ecosystems, the Alakaʻi Swamp "offers the least hope for maintaining endemic honeycreepers in the face of malaria and climate change".

Among invertebrates, Drosophila sharpi, an endangered species of Hawaiian picture-wing flies, is known only from two populations in areas adjacent to the Alakaʻi Swamp.

=== Flora ===
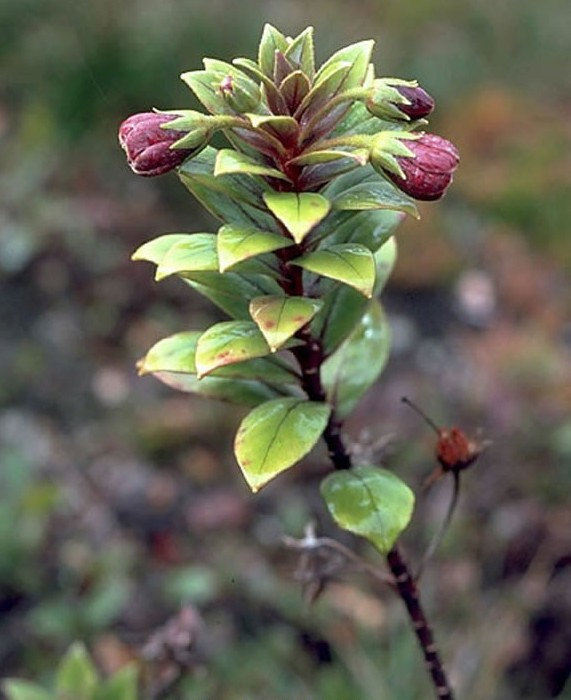
Lysimachia daphnoides (lehua makanoe)

Approximately 88% of the Alakaʻi Wilderness Preserve is covered by a Metrosideros polymorpha (ʻōhiʻa) forest. The wet forest largely consists of native plants that are also found on other Hawaiian Islands. Notable species of endemic plants that are federally endangered and are found in the area include:

- Kauai geranium (nohoanu, Geranium kauaiense), a critically imperiled species whose population was estimated as a total of 140 plants in 2010
- Astelia waialealae (painiu), a species of herb in the Asteliaceae family with about 26 plants remaining
- Dubautia plantaginea ssp. magnifolia (naenae), a shrub or small tree in the sunflower family (Asteraceae)
- Geniostoma pumilum (kamakahala), a shrub in the logania family (Loganiaceae)
- Helodeaster erici, a herb in the sunflower family (Asteraceae)
- Lysimachia daphnoides (lehua makanoe), a member of the myrsine family (Myrsinaceae)
- Melicope puberula (alani), a shrub in the rue family (Rutaceae)

Introduced species found in the area include: gold fern (Pityrogramma calomelanos), a type of sedge (Mariscus meyenianus), broadleaf rush (Juncus planifolius), narrow-leaved carpetgrass (Axonopus fissifoilius), vasey grass (Paspalum urvillei), Glenwood grass, (Sacciolepis indica), broomsedge (Andropogon virginicus), Kahili ginger (Hedychium gardnerianum), montbretia (Crocosmia × crocosmiiflora), firetree (Myrica faya), prickly Florida blackberry (Rubus argutus), thimbleberry (Rubus rosifolius), fireweed (Erechtites valerianifolia), and hairy cat's ear (Hypochoeris radicata).

== Access ==
The 3.5-mile (5.6 km) Alakaʻi Swamp trail allows visitors to access the nature preserve. The State of Hawaii Parks Division built an extensive boardwalk along most of the trail and elevated above the swamp as a measure to protect this highly sensitive habitat. The trail can be reached via the Pihea Vista trail, which is connected to the Puʻu o Kila lookout on Waimea Canyon road. This road is located behind a gate that is directly next to the Kalalau Valley lookout. Due to frequent rainfall, potholes are formed and the road is often closed. The end of this trail overlooks Hanalei Bay in the distance.
