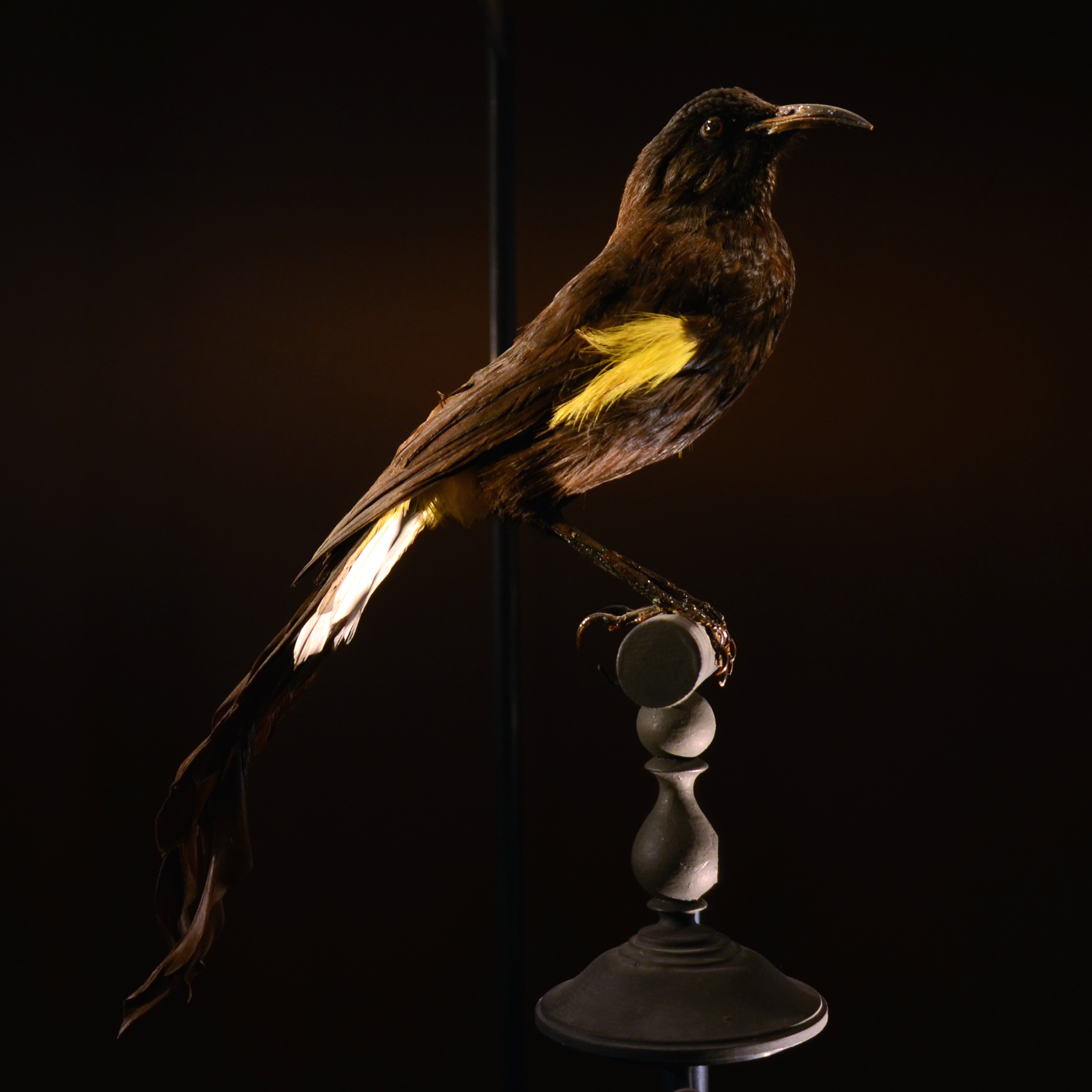
- Stuffed specimen, Grande Galerie de l'Evolution

Conservation status
- Extinct (1934) (IUCN 3.1)

Scientific classification
- Kingdom: Animalia
- Phylum: Chordata
- Class: Aves
- Order: Passeriformes
- Family: †Mohoidae
- Genus: †Moho
- Species: †M. nobilis

Binomial name
- †Moho nobilis (Merrem, 1786)
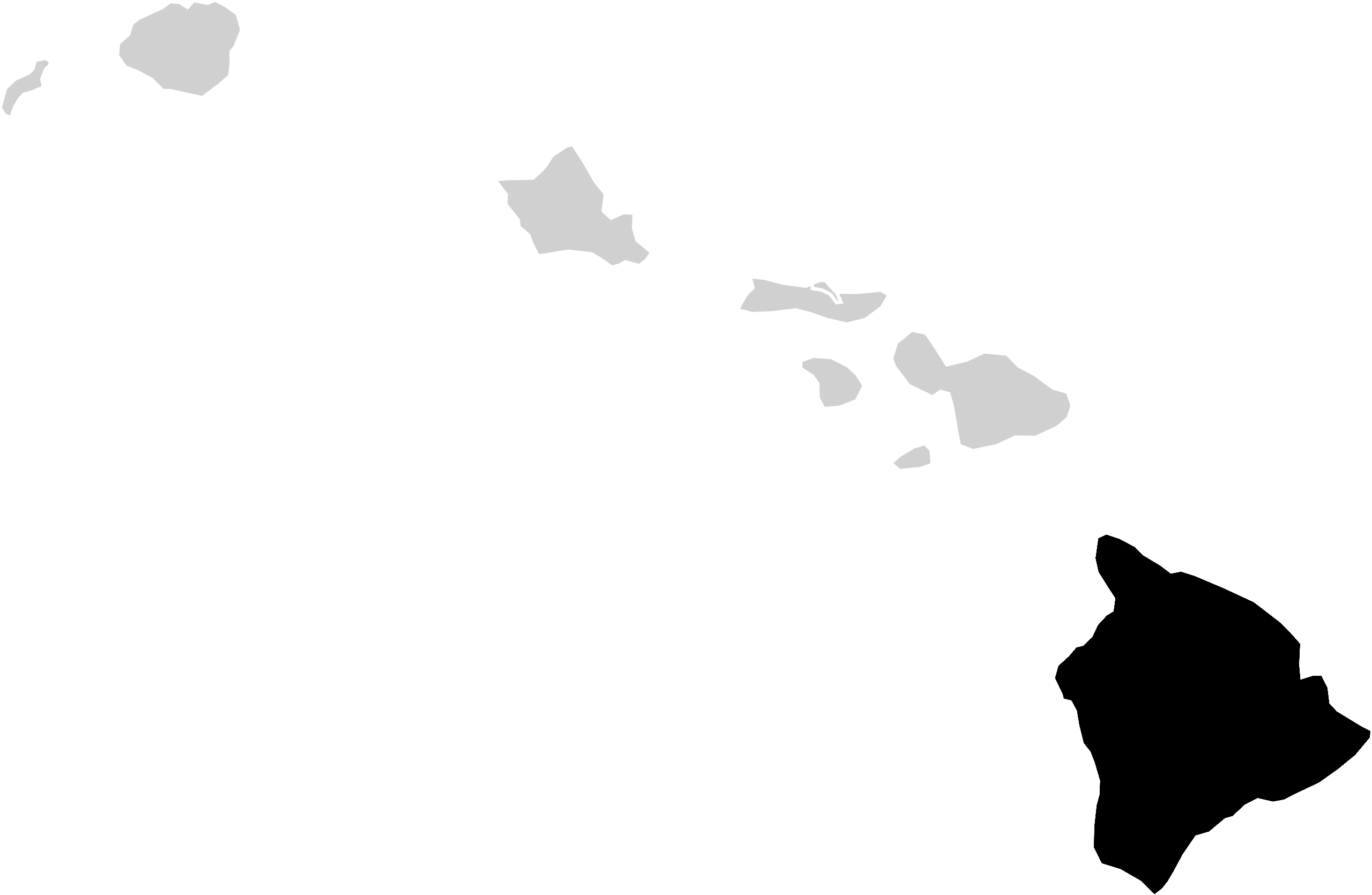

= Hawaiʻi ʻōʻō =

Extinct species of bird

The Hawaiʻi ʻōʻō (Moho nobilis) is an extinct Hawaiian honeyeater in the genus Moho. It was previously regarded as member of the Australo-Pacific honeyeaters (Meliphagidae).

== Description ==
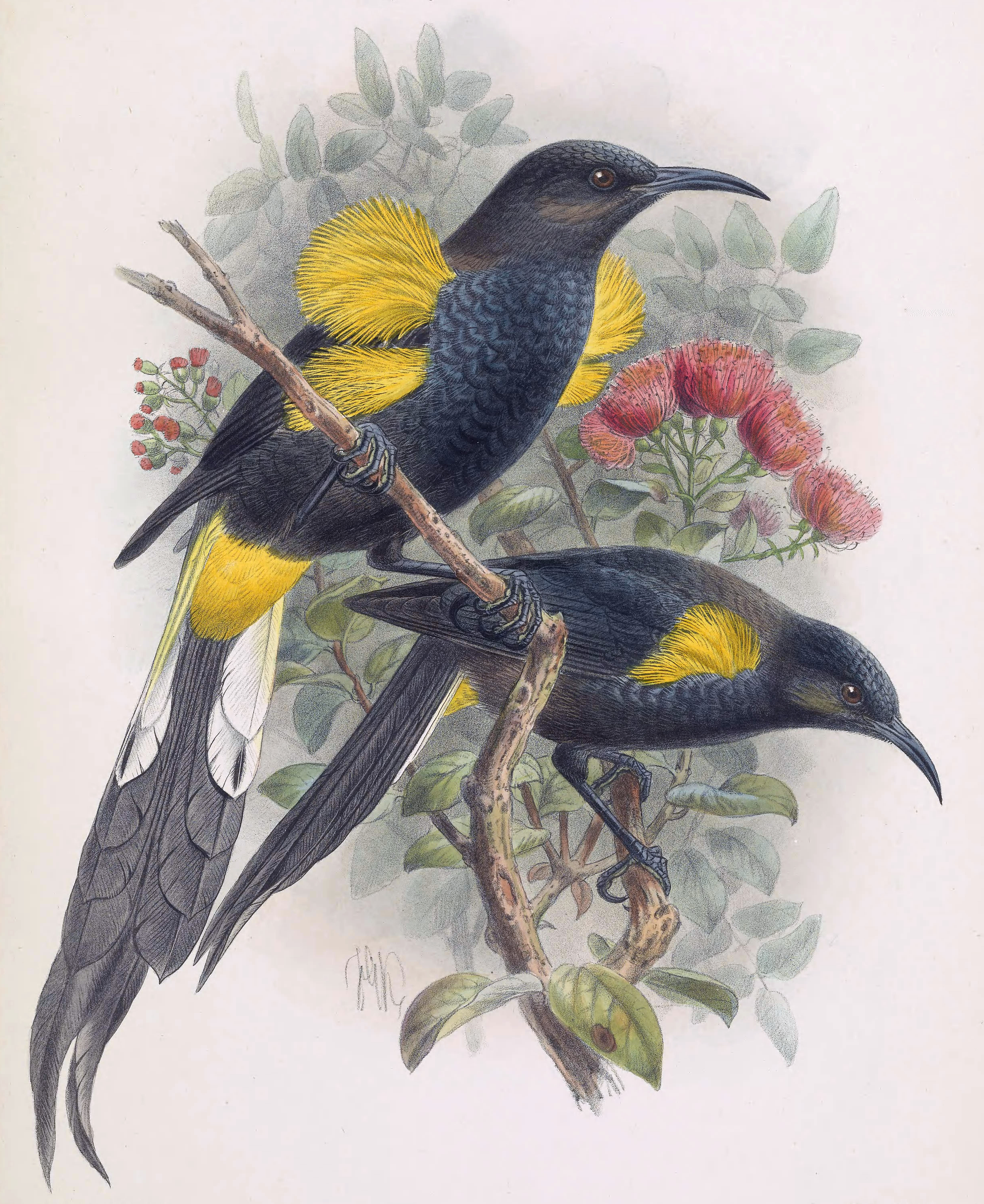
Illustration by John Gerrard Keulemans, 1893

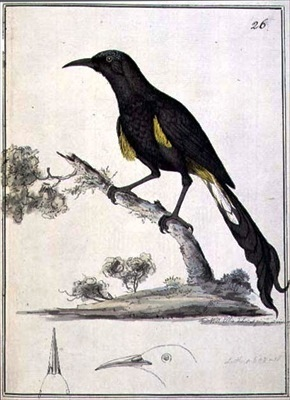
Illustration by William Ellis

The Hawaiʻi ʻōʻō was first described by Blasius Merrem in 1786. It had an overall length of 32 centimetres (13 in), wing length of 11–11.5 centimetres (4.3–4.5 in), and tail length of up to 19 centimetres (7.5 in). The sexes were similar in appearance, but females were smaller and the end of their tail feathers was not as twisted as that of males. The colour of its plumage was glossy black with a brown shading at the belly. It also had yellowish tufts at the axillaries, which juveniles lacked. It had some yellowish plumes on its rump, but lacked yellow thigh feathers like the Bishop's ʻōʻō, and also lacked the whitish edgings on its tail feathers like the Oʻahu ʻōʻō. It had the largest yellow plumes on its wings out of all the species of ʻōʻō. The name of the cinder cone Puʻu ʻŌʻō is often translated as "Hill of the ʻŌʻō-Bird", referring to this species.

The Hawaiʻi ʻōʻō had a dipping flight which was compared to that of the Eurasian magpie. George C. Munro noted that its wings could produce a buzzing sound while flapping quickly, which was not recorded in other birds present in its habitat. Its call was harsh and disyllabic, and this led to the belief that the name ʻōʻō was derived from this species. It was typically shy and timid, but it was highly aggressive towards other birds when they approached its territory, even interrupting its own acts to drive them away. This usually involved the bird engaging in a display, in which it would raise its wings, erect its tail feathers and display its yellowish plumes while attacking them. Nests and eggs of the Hawaiʻi ʻōʻō have never been discovered, mainly because the species preferred to settle in the highest of branches.

== Extinction ==
When Europeans first arrived, it was still relatively common on the Big Island, but its decline followed rapidly afterwards. Its striking plumage was already used for ʻaʻahu aliʻi (robes), ʻahu ʻula (capes), and kāhili (feathered staffs) of aliʻi (Hawaiian nobility) by Native Hawaiians. Some were even caught and put in cages to be sold as songbirds, only to live for a few days or weeks before diseases from mosquitoes befell them. The decline of this bird was hastened by the introduction of the musket, which allowed hunters and collectors to shoot birds down from a distance, from great heights, and in great numbers. As late as 1898, hunters were still able to kill over a thousand individuals in one hunt, but after that year, the Hawaiʻi ʻōʻō population declined rapidly. The birds became too rare to be shot in any great quantities, but continued to be found for nearly 30 years.

Despite records of mass hunting, collection seemed to play only a minor role in the species' extinction, and mosquito-borne diseases and deforestation probably were the major reasons for its extinction (very similar to the other members of its genus). The last known sighting was in 1934 on the slopes of Mauna Loa.

== See also ==
- Kauai ʻoʻo
- Oahu ʻoʻo
- Bishop's ʻoʻo
