= Geniostoma pumilum =

Conservation status
- Endangered (IUCN 3.1)

- Critically Imperiled (NatureServe)

Scientific classification
- Kingdom: Plantae
- Clade: Tracheophytes
- Clade: Angiosperms
- Clade: Eudicots
- Clade: Asterids
- Order: Gentianales
- Family: Loganiaceae
- Genus: Geniostoma
- Species: G. pumilum

Binomial name
- Geniostoma pumilum (Hillebr.) Byng & Christenh.

Synonyms
- Labordia fagraeoidea var. pumila Hillebr. (1888); Labordia pallida f. alpina Wawra (1872); Labordia pumila (Hillebr.) Skottsb. (1935 publ. 1936)

Species of plant

Geniostoma pumila, the Kauaʻi labordia, is a rare species of flowering plant in the Loganiaceae family. It is endemic to Hawaii, where it is found only on Kauaʻi. It is a federally listed endangered species of the United States. Like other labordias, this plant is known as kamakahala.

This is a shrub producing cymes of up to 15 orange flowers. It grows in the typical bog habitat of the Alakai Plateau.

There are only three remaining populations of this species, all on the Alakai Plateau, including one at the summit of Mount Waiʻaleʻale. Estimates of the total global population are generally around 800 or 900 but the number could be as high as 6000.

This plant is threatened by feral ungulates, such as wild boars, and the introduction of invasive species of plants.
