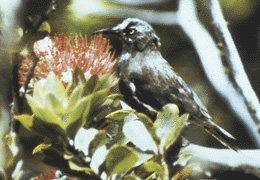
- Kauaʻi ʻōʻō

Conservation status
- Extinct (1987) (IUCN 3.1)

- Extinct (ESA)

Scientific classification
- Kingdom: Animalia
- Phylum: Chordata
- Class: Aves
- Order: Passeriformes
- Family: †Mohoidae
- Genus: †Moho
- Species: †M. braccatus

Binomial name
- †Moho braccatus Cassin, 1855
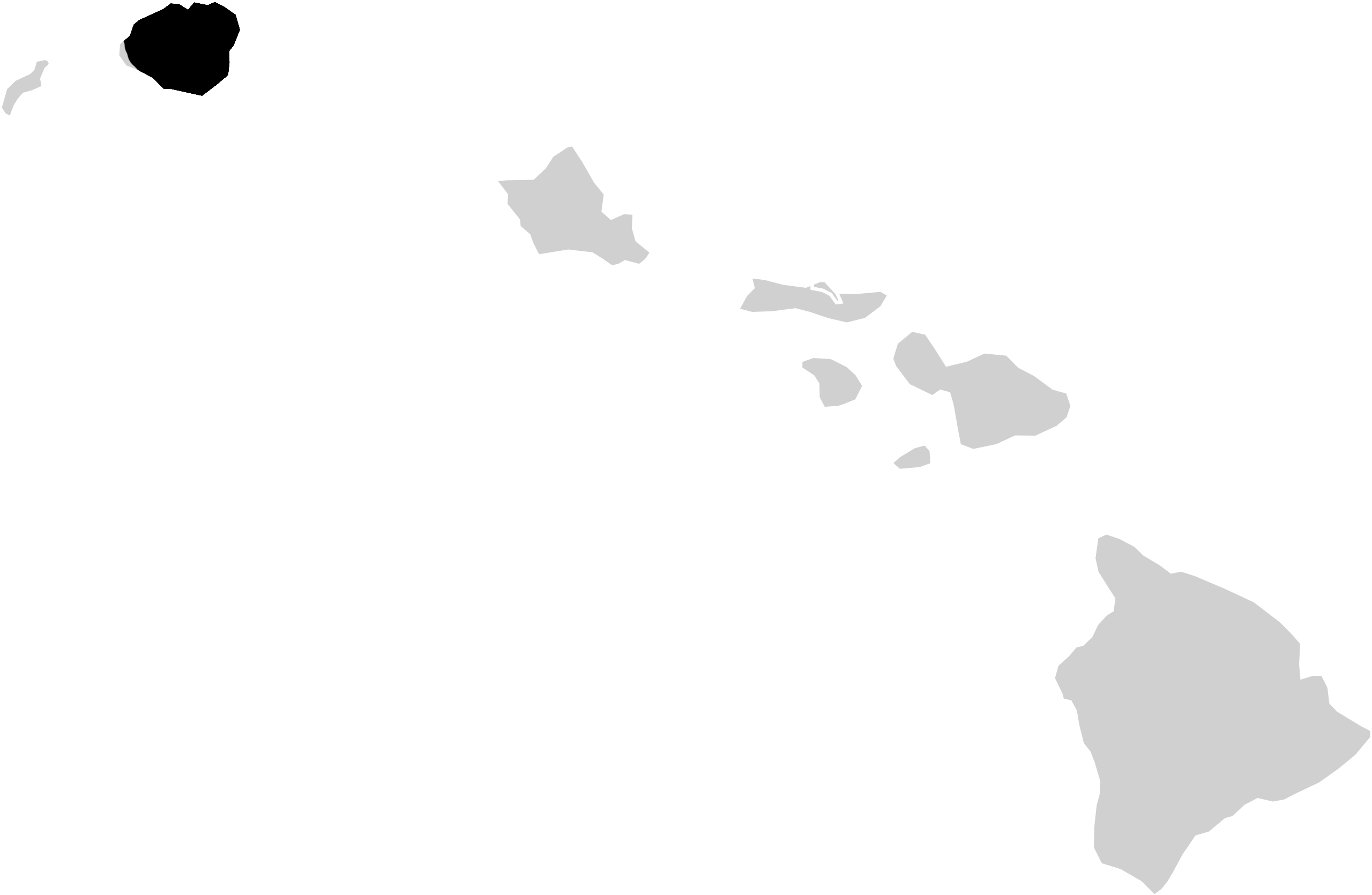

Synonyms
- Mohoa braccata Cassin, 1855; Moho nobilis braccatus (Cassin, 1855); Pseudomoho braccatus (Cassin, 1855); Acrulocercus braccatus (Cassin, 1855)

= Kauaʻi ʻōʻō =

Extinct species of bird

The Kauaʻi ʻōʻō (/kɑːˈwɑː.iː ˈoʊ.oʊ/) or ʻōʻōʻāʻā (Moho braccatus) is an extinct species of ʻōʻō that was endemic to the Hawaiian island of Kauaʻi. It was the last species of Hawaiian honeyeater to exist; the entire family is now officially extinct. The family had originated over 15-20 million years ago during the Miocene, with the Kauaʻi ʻōʻō's extinction marking the first extinction of an entire avian family in over 500 years. The bird was common in the subtropical forests of the island until the early twentieth century, when its decline began. It was last seen in 1985, and last heard in 1987. The causes of its extinction include the introduction of predators (such as the Polynesian rat, small Indian mongoose, and the domestic pig), mosquito-borne diseases, and habitat destruction.

== Etymology and taxonomy ==
The native Hawaiians named the bird ʻōʻō ʻāʻā, from the Hawaiian word ʻōʻō, an onomatopoeic descriptor from the sound of their mating call, and ʻāʻā, meaning dwarf. Like the other members of its family, the Kauaʻi ʻōʻō was previously regarded as a member of the Australo-Pacific honeyeaters (family Meliphagidae).

== Description ==
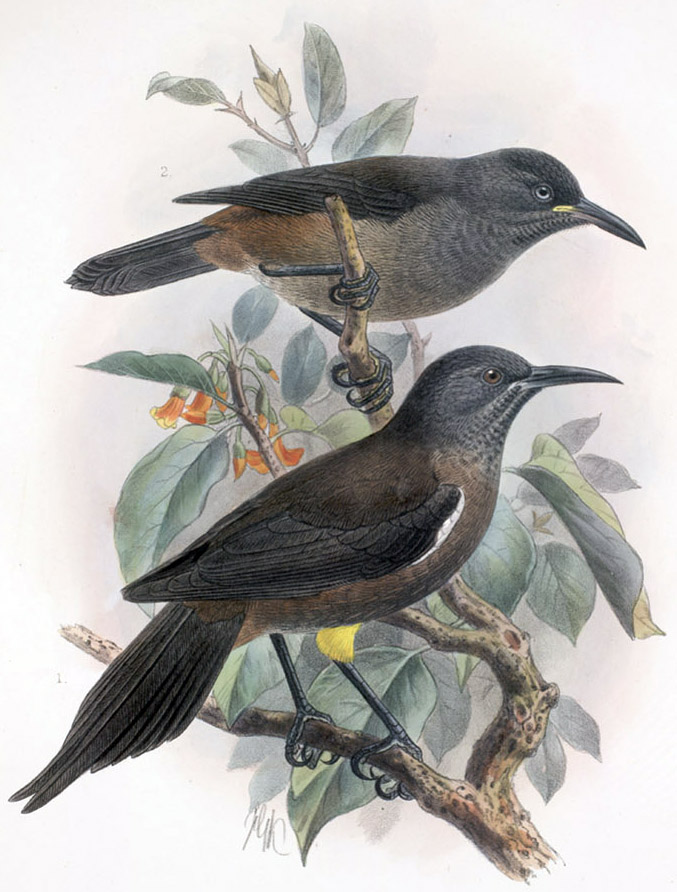
Adult and juvenile Moho braccatus

This bird was among the smallest of the Hawaiian ʻōʻōs, if not the smallest species, at just over 20 centimetres (8 in) in length. The head, wings, and tail were black. The rest of the upperparts were slaty brown, becoming rufous on the rump and flanks. The throat and breast were black with white barring, which was particularly prominent in females. The central tail feathers were long, and there was a small tuft of gray feathers under the base of the wing. While the beak and legs were black, the leg feathers were a rich golden yellow. It was the only ʻōʻō known to have eyes with yellow irises. Like other honeyeaters it had a sharp, slightly curved bill for sampling nectar. Its favored nectar sources were Lobelia species and the ʻohiʻa lehua tree. This species was additionally observed foraging in lapalapa trees. It also ate small invertebrates and fruit. The Kauaʻi ʻōʻō was very vocal, making hollow, erratic, flute-like calls. Both the males and females were known to sing.

== Extinction ==
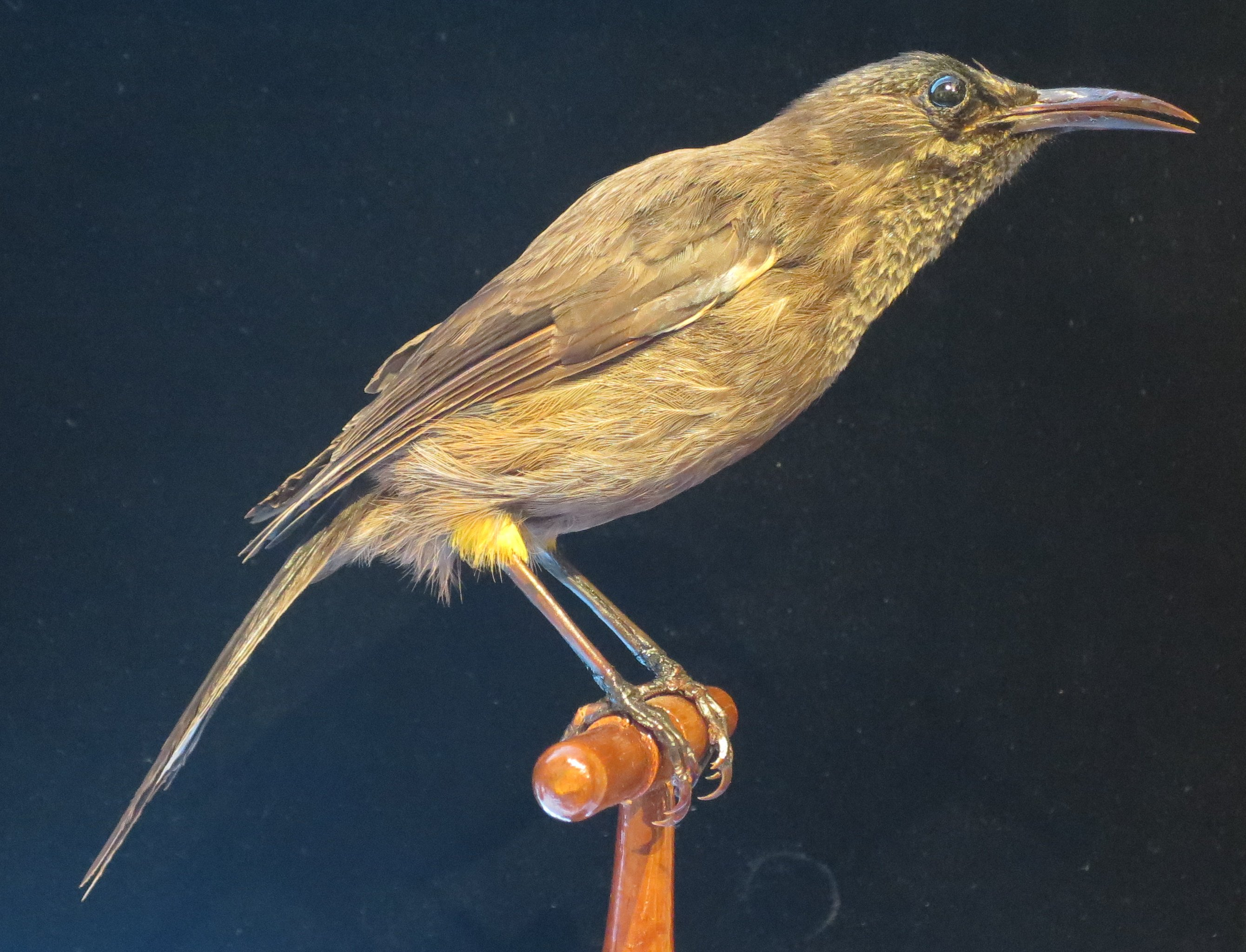
Specimen, Bishop Museum, Honolulu

The bird was a cavity nester that inhabited the densely forested canyons of Kauaʻi. All of its relatives, including the Hawaiʻi ʻōʻō, Bishop's ʻōʻō, and Oʻahu ʻōʻō are also extinct. Relatively little is known about these species. The bird's decline was attributed to several factors, including mosquito-transmitted diseases, which restricted its range to higher elevations and eventually confined it to montane forests in the Alakaʻi Wilderness Preserve, as well as the introduction of mammalian predators and widespread deforestation.

By the early 1960s, the bird's population was estimated at approximately 34 individuals, making it critically endangered. During the 1970s, John L. Sincock filmed the only known footage of the species on Super 8 film. Several recordings of its vocalizations were made during this period, with Harold Douglas Pratt Jr. among those involved in documenting its songs.

Two hurricanes, Iwa and Iniki, struck Kaua'i within a decade of each other and contributed significantly to the species' decline. The storms destroyed many of the mature trees containing the cavities used for nesting, while the damage caused by Hurricane Iniki further hindered the regeneration of suitable trees. These environmental changes precipitated the species' disappearance. The last known female was likely killed during Hurricane Iwa, while the last confirmed sighting of a male occurred in 1985. The bird's final known vocal recording was made by David Boynton in 1987.

Following unsuccessful expeditions in 1989 and the destruction caused by Hurricane Iniki in 1992, the species was declared extinct by the IUCN in 2000. Despite this, some believe that it could survive in remote areas of Kaua'i, particularly because it had previously been declared extinct on two occasions: in the 1940s, before being rediscovered in 1960 and again from the late 1960s to the early 1970s, when it was rediscovered by wildlife biologist John L. Sincock. However, its loud and distinctive vocalizations would likely make surviving individuals detectable, and intensive surveys conducted between 1989 and 2000 failed to locate any.

In 2021, the United States Fish and Wildlife Service proposed removing the species from the Endangered Species Act. In October 2023, the species was officially declared extinct.
