= David Boynton =

Hawaiian natural historian (1945–2007)

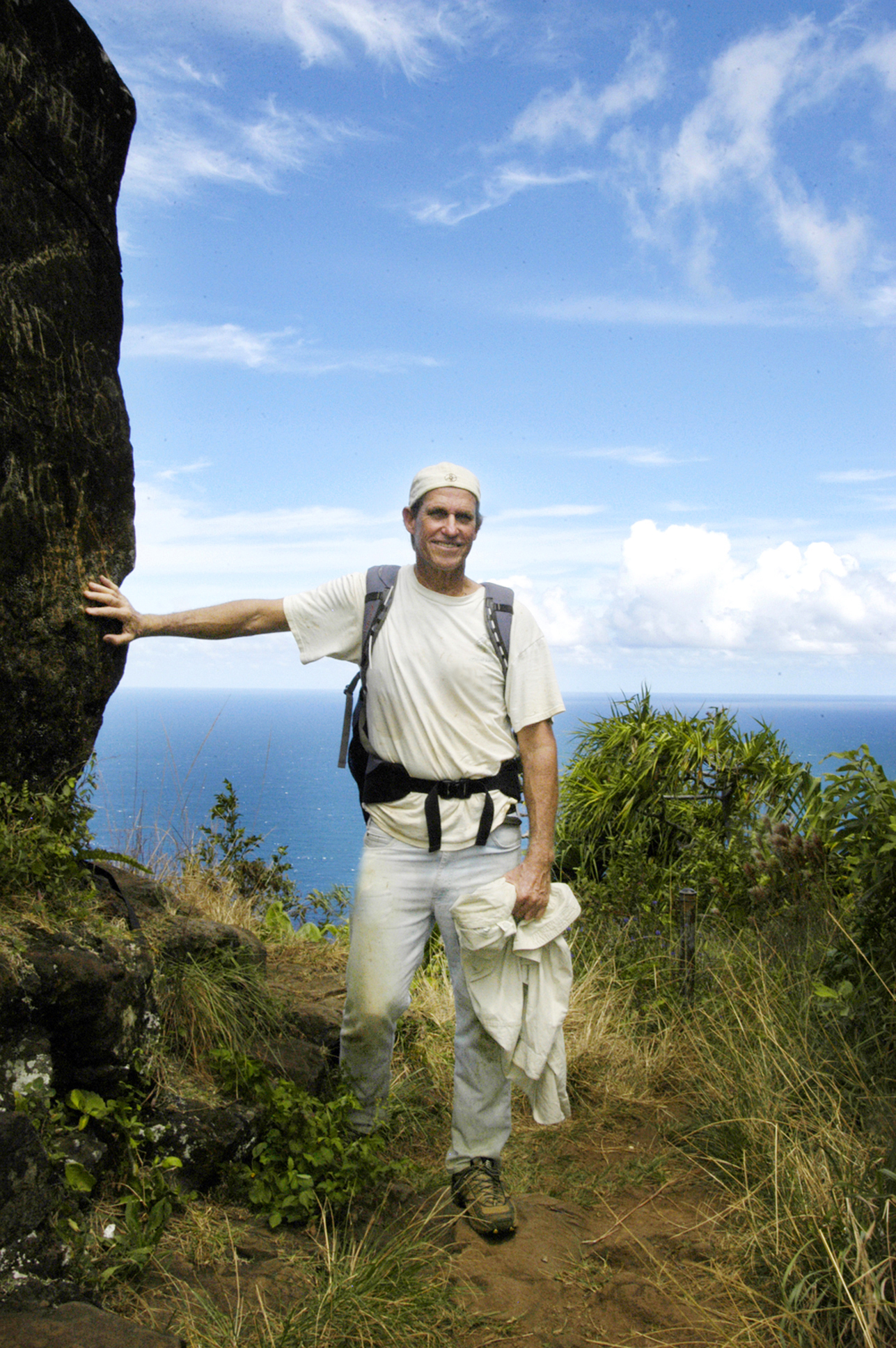
- Boynton in 2005
- Born: August 30, 1945; Honolulu, Hawaii, U.S.
- Died: February 10, 2007 (aged 61); Miloliʻi, Hawaii
- Burial place: Oahu Cemetery, Hawaii
- Education: University of California-Santa Barbara
- Occupations: Historian; teacher; photographer
- Known for: Recording the last known living specimen of the Kauaʻi ʻōʻō

David Boynton (August 30, 1945 – February 10, 2007) was an American naturalist. He was a leading expert on the natural history of the Hawaiian island of Kauaʻi, especially on the Kokeʻe Forest and the Alakaʻi Swamp and its wildlife. He was called "a voice for the Hawaiian wilderness," a "Guardian of the Kokeʻe Forest," and as an educator, "the window through which thousands of Hawai'i students learned about Hawaiian birds, plants, marine creatures, climate and much more." Boynton photographed a bird now believed extinct, the Kauaʻi ʻōʻō (Moho braccatus). He recorded the mating call of the single male, whose mate presumably did not survive Hurricane Iwa, in late 1987. The bird, probably the last of its species, was tending an empty nest. Boynton used this poignant recording and story to inspire Hawaiian school children in the traditional Hawaiian values of kuleana, malama, kokua, laulima, hoʻihi, lokahi, and pono, which translate roughly as rights and responsibilities to the land, the appropriateness of serving nature, helping others, cooperation, respect, peace and unity, and duty to do what is right.

== Naturalist and teacher ==
=== Early life and education ===
David Spalding Boynton, born and raised in Oahu, graduated from the Punahou School in Honolulu in 1963, where his alumni profile says he "would rather have been in the ocean than in the classroom." Boynton graduated from the University of California, Santa Barbara in 1967 and returned to live in Hawaii.

=== Career ===
He was appointed the environmental resource teacher for Kauaʻi School District after 18 years as a teacher at Waimea High School. In 1992, David was honored by the Kōkeʻe Natural History Museum with the "One Person Can Make a Difference" award. Boynton was instrumental in the creation, by the state Department of Education, of the Kōkeʻe Discovery Center in 1994, a "groundbreaking" overnight outdoor education facility and student-teacher resource center for fourth and fifth graders in Kōkeʻe State Park, where he served as director. Boynton claimed that Kōkeʻe and surrounding wilderness areas contained many endangered species, over 400 different native plants, and the greatest concentration of 'single-island endemics' anywhere, making it the ideal place to teach about biodiversity, sustainability and environmental stewardship. The David S. Boynton Educational Grant was established in his memory. Grants, for projects supporting the values Boynton taught, up to a maximum of $1,500 each are awarded to educators or students. The first grant was awarded in 2009.

== Photography ==
Boynton was a much-published author or co-author of photographic essays of Hawaii. Among his books are:

- Na Pali: Images of Kauai's Northwest Shore (2007)
- Kauai (2006)
- Flowers-Images from Hawaii's Gardens (with his wife, Sue Boynton) (2006)
- Kilauea Point and Kauai's National Wildlife Refuges (2004)
- Kauai, the Garden Island: A Pictorial History of the Commerce and Work of the People (with Chris Cook) (1999)
- The Kaua'i Movie Book (with Chris Cook) (1996)
- Kaua'i Days (2005)
- Discover Hawaii's Forests (2000)
- Capturing Hawaii: Kauai (1998)
- Hawaii Humpback Vol. 1 (1980)
- Kaua`i: Ancient Place Names and Their Stories (1998) (with Frederick Wichman)
- By Wind, By Waves (with David L. Eyre) (2000)

In addition, his photographs have been reproduced in countless magazines, newspapers, and posters. Boynton assisted in the production of the Emmy award-winning 1991 National Geographic Special documentary film, Hawaii: Strangers in Paradise.

== Death ==
Boynton's body was found in February 2007 at the foot of a 300-foot cliff on the north face of the remote Miloliʻi Valley of the Nā Pali coast, by all evidence the victim of an accident on the difficult trail. It is believed while traveling on the trail, he had accidentally slipped and fallen. It was reported that Boynton had been alone en route to photograph sea turtles on Miloliʻi Beach. He was familiar with this rugged trail and terrain. He told a journalist in 2006, "There is a fern that grows in thick mats along these ridges, and I know from personal experience that you can try to push your way through this green layer and wind up stepping off into air."
