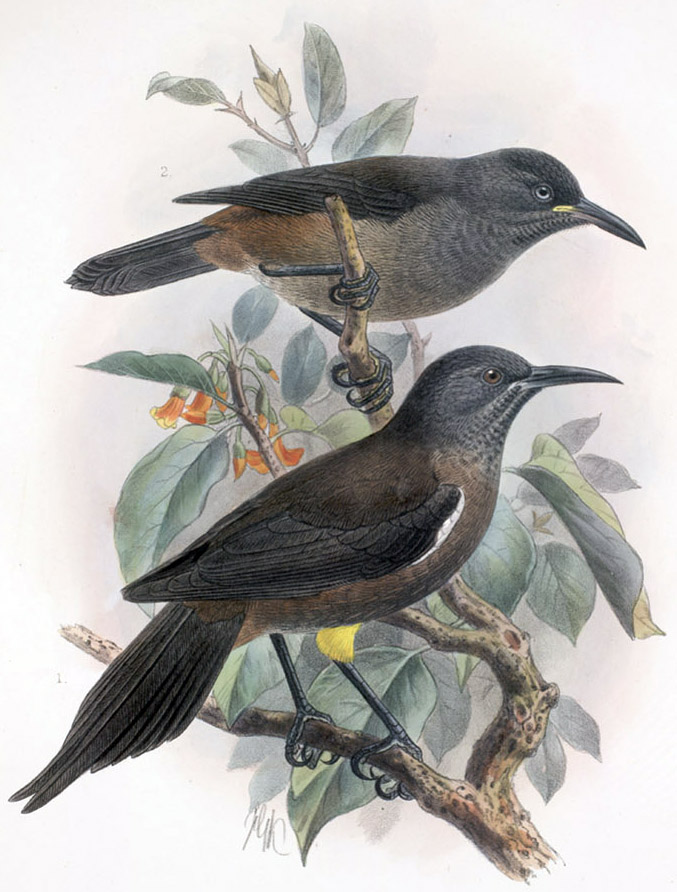
- Kauaʻi ʻōʻō (Moho braccatus), the last surviving member of the Mohoidae (extinct c. 1987)

Scientific classification
- Kingdom: Animalia
- Phylum: Chordata
- Class: Aves
- Order: Passeriformes
- Family: †Mohoidae
- Genus: †Moho; Lesson, 1830

Type species
- †Moho fasciculatus Latham, 1790

Species
- See text

Synonyms
- Acrulocerus Cabanis, 1847; Mohohina Mathews, 1925; Pseudomoho Mathews, 1925; Mohornis Mathews, 1930

= Moho (genus) =

ʻŌʻō

Extinct genus of birds

Moho is a genus of extinct birds in the Hawaiian bird family, Mohoidae, that were endemic to the Hawaiian Islands. Members of the genus are known as ʻōʻō in the Hawaiian language. Their plumage was generally striking glossy black; some species had yellowish axillary tufts and other black outer feathers. Most of these species became extinct by habitat loss, the introduction of mammalian predators (like rats, pigs, and mongooses), and by extensive hunting; their plumage was used for the creation of numerous precious articles of clothing for the aliʻi (Hawaiian nobility), including ʻaʻahu aliʻi (robes), ʻahu ʻula (capes), kāhili (feathered staffs), and mahiole (feathered helmets). The Kauaʻi ʻōʻō was the last species of this genus to become extinct, likely a victim of avian malaria.

Until recently, the birds in this genus were thought to belong to the family Meliphagidae (honeyeaters) because they looked and acted so similar to members of that family, including many morphological details. A 2008 study argued, on the basis of a phylogenetic analysis of DNA from museum specimens, that the genera Moho and Chaetoptila do not belong to the Meliphagidae but instead belong to a group that includes the waxwings and the palmchat; they appear especially close to the silky-flycatchers. The authors proposed a family, Mohoidae, for these two extinct genera.

The album O'o by jazz composer John Zorn, released in 2009, is named after these birds.

== Taxonomy ==
The following species belong to this genus (in addition, subfossil remains of a species are known from Maui and known in literature as the Maui ʻōʻō, Moho sp.):

Image	Common name	Scientific name	Extinct since	Localization
	Oʻahu ʻōʻō	Moho apicalis	c. 1837	Oahu, Hawaii
	Bishop's ʻōʻō or Molokaʻi ʻōʻō	Moho bishopi	c. 1981	Molokai, Maui, and Lanai, Hawaii
	Kauaʻi ʻōʻō	Moho braccatus	c. 1987	Kauai, Hawaii
	Hawaiʻi ʻōʻō	Moho nobilis	c. 1934	Hawaii, Hawaii

== Bibliography ==
- Day, David (1981): The Doomsday Book of Animals
- Greenway, James C. (1967): Extinct and Vanishing Birds of the World
