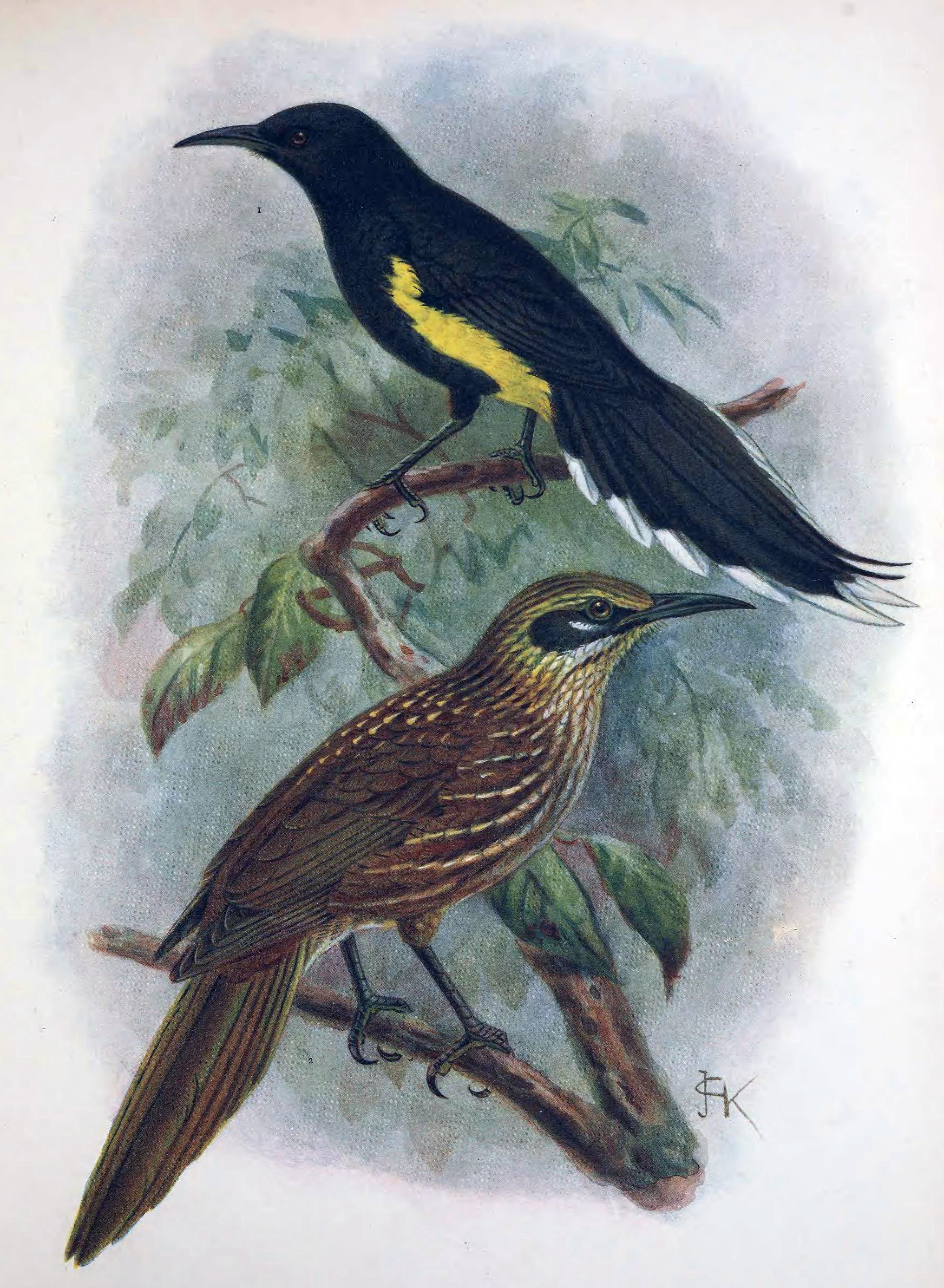
- Top to bottom: an Oʻahu ʻōʻō and a kioea

Scientific classification
- Kingdom: Animalia
- Phylum: Chordata
- Class: Aves
- Order: Passeriformes
- Superfamily: Bombycilloidea
- Family: †Mohoidae; Fleischer, James and Olson, 2008

Genera
- †Moho †Chaetoptila

Diversity
- Moho: 4 Chaetoptila: 3

= Mohoidae =

Hawaiian honeyeaters Temporal range: Miocene to Holocene

Extinct family of birds

Mohoidae, also known as the Hawaiian honeyeaters, is a family of Hawaiian species of now recently extinct, nectarivorous songbirds in the genera Moho (ʻōʻō) and Chaetoptila (kioea). These now extinct birds form their own family, representing the only complete extinction of an entire avian family in modern times, when the disputed family Turnagridae is regarded as invalid. The last surviving species in the family, the Kauaʻi ʻōʻō (Moho braccatus), became extinct after 1987.

== Taxonomy ==
Until recently, these birds were thought to belong to the family Meliphagidae (honeyeaters) due to their very similar appearance and behavior, including many morphological details. However, a 2008 study argued, on the basis of a phylogenetic analysis of DNA from museum specimens, that the genera Moho and Chaetoptila are not even closely related to the Meliphagidae but instead belong to a group within the Passerida that includes the waxwings and the palmchat; they appear especially close to the silky-flycatchers. Hawaiian honeyeaters did not evolve from the similar looking Australasian honeyeaters, but instead represent a striking case of convergent evolution. The authors proposed a family, Mohoidae, for these two extinct genera.

Phylogenetic evidence from a 2019 taxonomic study supports the Mohoidae having an early Miocene origin, having originated 15-20 million years ago, and being the sister group to the family Hypocoliidae, which contains only the grey hypocolius (Hypocolius ampelinus), with the clade containing Mohoidae and Hypocoliidae being sister to the hylocitrea of Hylocitreidae, which diverged from them slightly earlier in the Miocene. This makes them much older than the other major radiation of endemic Hawaiian birds, the Hawaiian honeycreepers (a clade within Fringillidae), which originated much later in the Miocene, around 7 million years ago.

== Species ==
Family: Mohoidae

- †Chaetoptila P.L. Sclater, 1871
  - †Chaetoptila angustipluma Peale, 1848 (Kioea)
  - †Chaetoptila cf.angustipluma (Oahu kioea - extinct before European contact)
  - ?Chaetoptila sp. (Narrow-billed kioea - extinct before European contact)
- †Moho Lesson, 1830 - ʻōʻō
  - †Moho apicalis Gould, 1860 – Oʻahu ʻōʻō
  - †Moho bishopi Rothschild, 1893 – Bishop's ʻōʻō
  - †Moho braccatus Cassin, 1855 – Kauaʻi ʻōʻō
  - †Moho nobilis Merrem, 1786 – Hawaiʻi ʻōʻō
  - Maui ʻōʻō — Moho sp. (Extinct in prehistory )

== Gallery ==
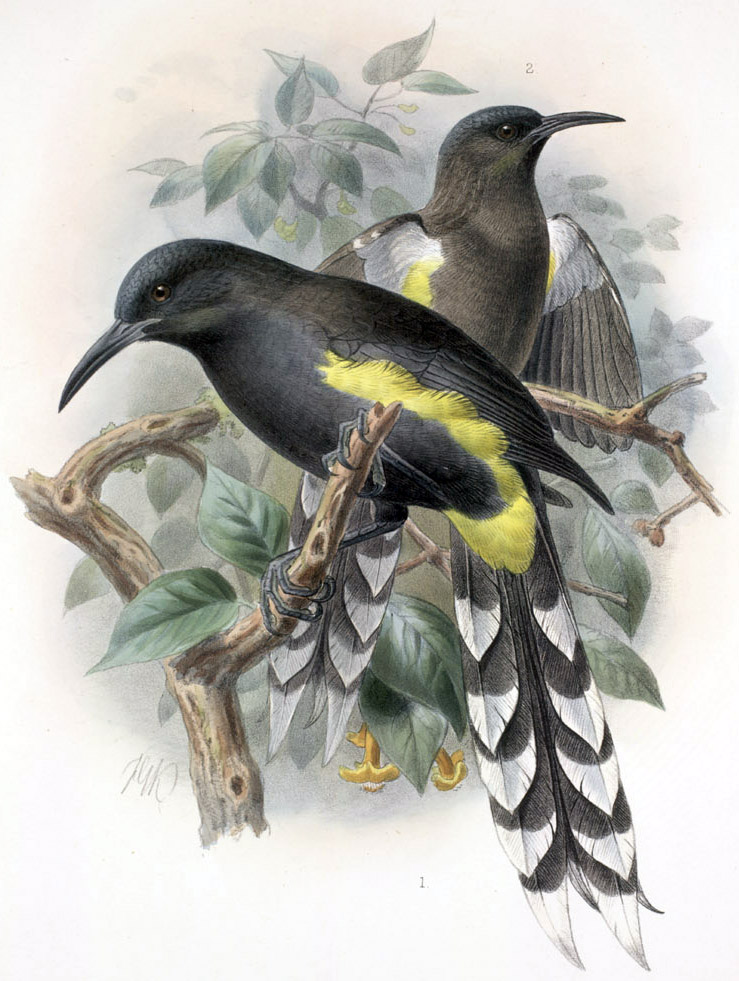
Oʻahu ʻōʻō

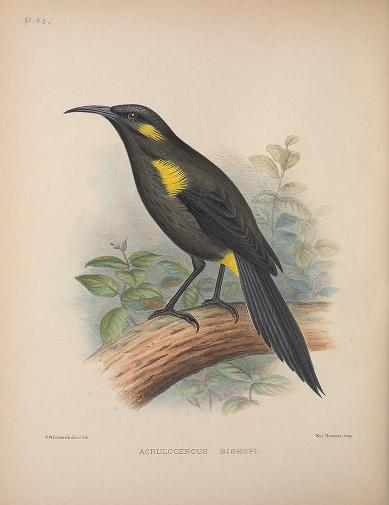
Bishop's ʻōʻō

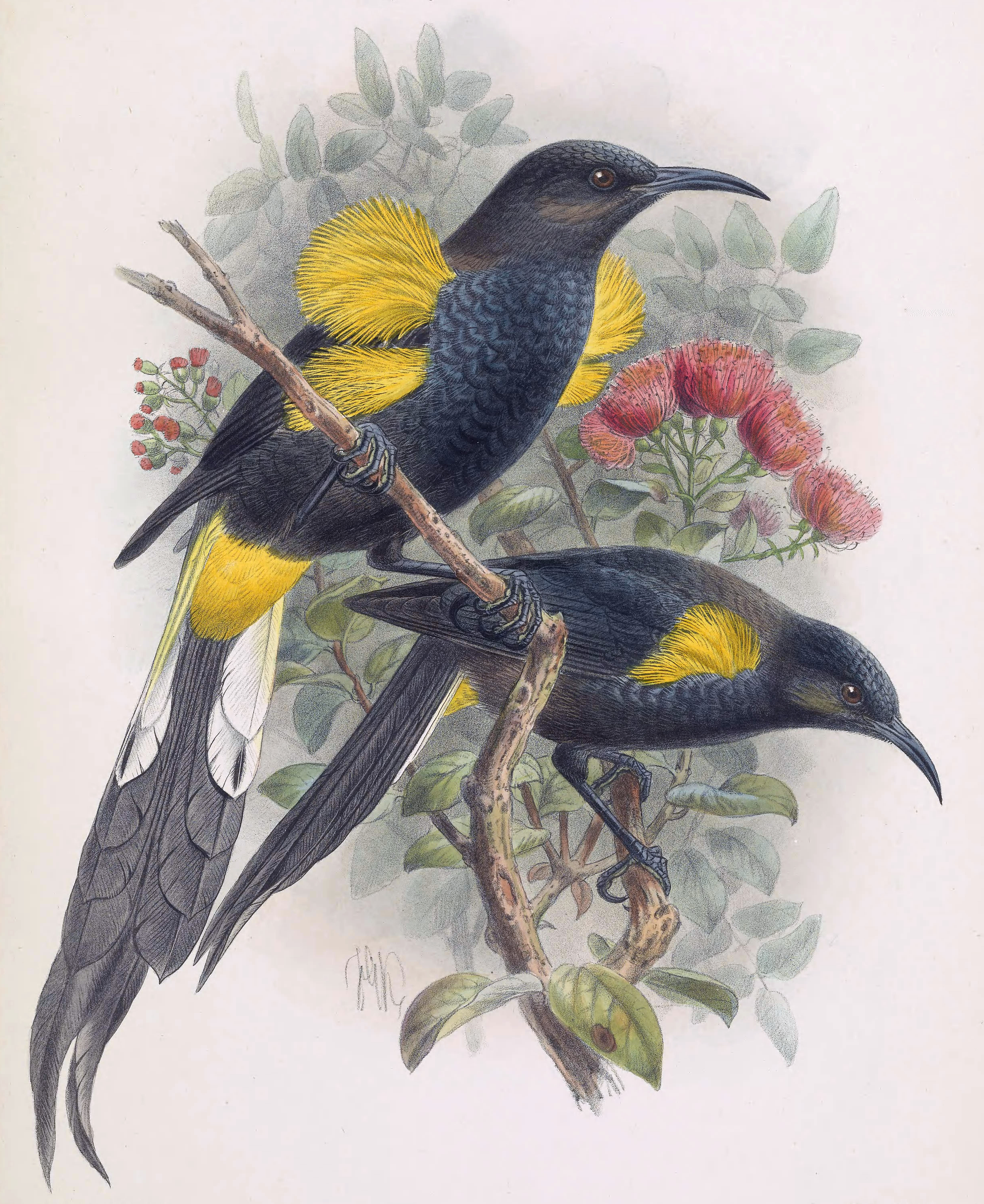
Hawaiʻi ʻōʻō

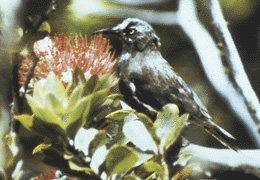
Kauaʻi ʻōʻō

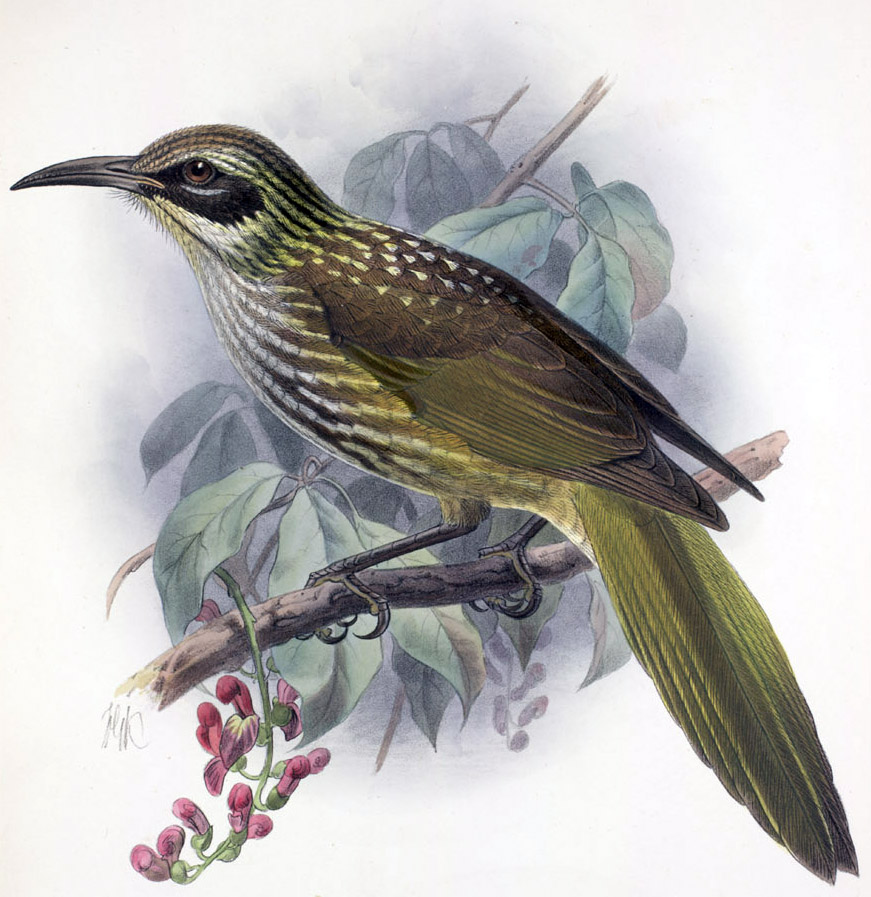
Kioea
