= Big Bog, Maui =

Largest high-altitude bog in the Hawaiian Islands in the United States

Big Bog
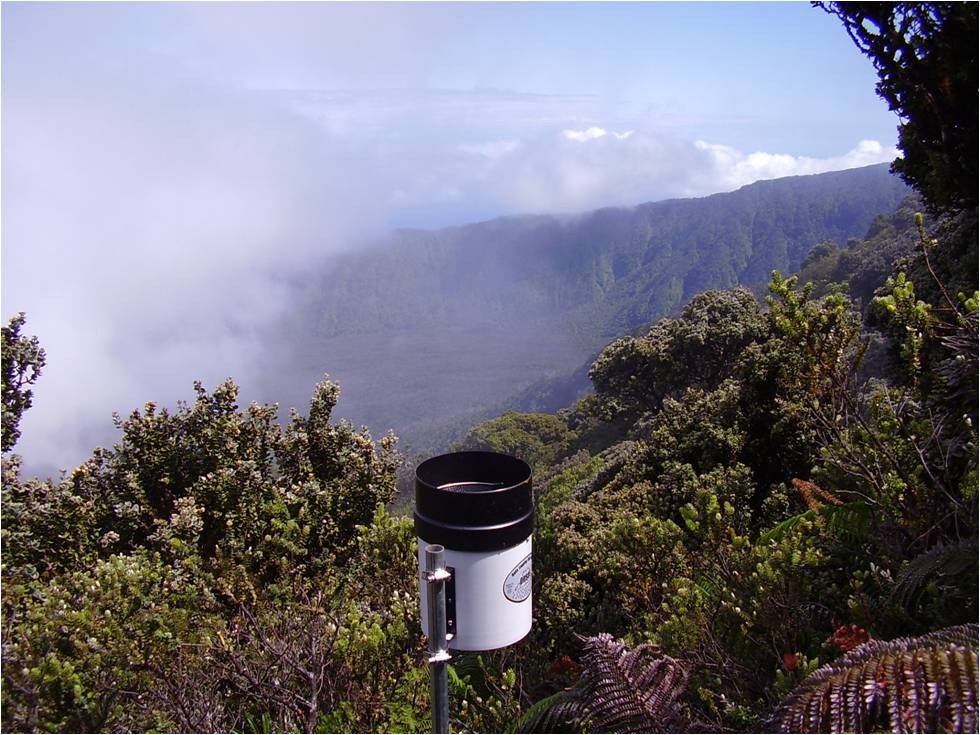
- Rain gauge on a ridge overlooking the Big Bog

Highest point
- Elevation: 5,400 ft (1,600 m)
- Coordinates: 20°43′44″N 156°05′31″W

Geography
- Location within Hawaii
- Location: Maui, Hawaii, United States

The Big Bog is a high-altitude bog on the island of Maui, the largest in the Hawaiian Islands. It is located on Haleakala's east rift zone, at the border between Hāna Forest Reserve and Haleakalā National Park. It is alleged to be one of the wettest places on Earth, with a reported annual rainfall of 404 inches (10,300 mm) for the period 1992-2018 according to the University of Hawaiʻi at Mānoa.

While the summit of Mount Waiʻaleʻale on Kauai has long been considered the wettest place in the Hawaiian Islands, and was claimed to be the second wettest place on Earth, its NOAA-reported annual rainfall of 373.85 inches (9,495.8 mm) is exceeded by Big Bog's 30-year average.

== Climate ==
The Big Bog has a tropical rainforest climate (Köppen Af), with no observable dry season and nearly constant torrential rainfall. Prior to the establishment of the station there in 1992, rainfall for Big Bog was estimated at around 4,600 millimetres (180 in) per year. However, the first full year of recorded data showed 13,995 millimetres (551.0 in) of rainfall, which is one of the highest annual rainfall totals measured in the Hawaiian Islands. Since then, the annual average has been recorded as 404 inches (10,300 mm). Clear days are essentially nonexistent, and even when it is not raining, it is almost certainly cloudy or foggy. The lack of adequate drainage has caused moisture to accumulate, forming the bog.

Climate data for Big Bog (HN-164) 1993-2011
Month	Jan	Feb	Mar	Apr	May	Jun	Jul	Aug	Sep	Oct	Nov	Dec	Year
Average rainfall inches (mm)	32.17 (817.0)	24.94 (633.6)	52.07 (1,322.7)	38.51 (978.1)	25.52 (648.2)	28.51 (724.2)	32.80 (833.0)	31.04 (788.5)	26.07 (662.2)	38.31 (973.1)	38.02 (965.8)	36.42 (925.0)	404.38 (10,271.4)

=== Causes ===
The Big Bog lies at 5,400 feet (1,600 m), very close to the trade wind inversion layer, leading to persistent transport of moisture rich air by the northeast trade winds up the steep mountain slopes. These trade winds condense to form clouds and precipitation. Its reputation as the cloudiest place in the Hawaiian Islands is supported by its average solar radiation and potential evapotranspiration being the lowest amongst recorded locations in the state, and relative humidity and cloud attenuation the highest.

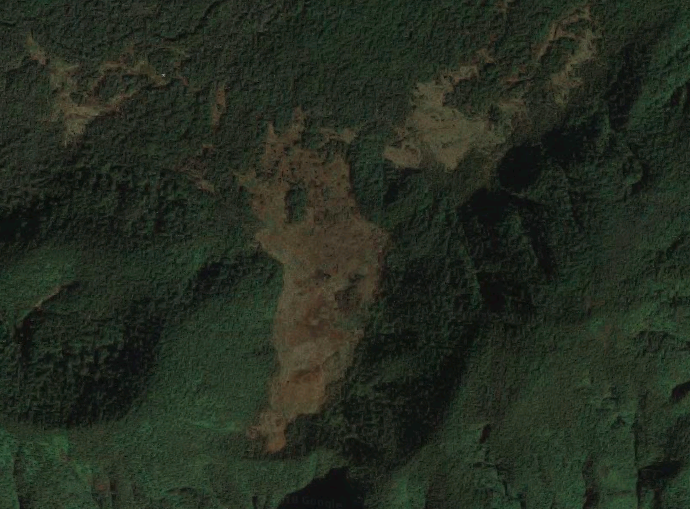
Satellite image of the Big Bog on Maui, the wettest place in Oceania

== See also ==
- Mount Waiʻaleʻale
- Wettest places on Earth
- Hawaiʻi
- Maui
