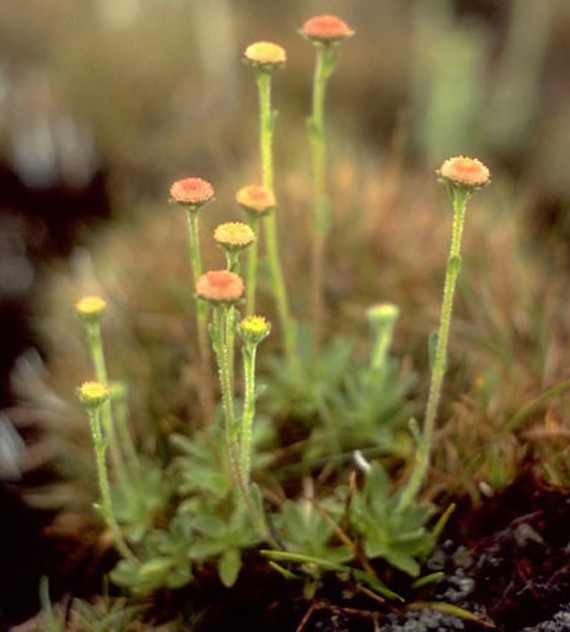
- Helodeaster helenae

Scientific classification
- Kingdom: Plantae
- Clade: Tracheophytes
- Clade: Angiosperms
- Clade: Eudicots
- Clade: Asterids
- Order: Asterales
- Family: Asteraceae
- Genus: Helodeaster; G.L.Nesom (2020)

species
- Helodeaster erici (C.N.Forbes) G.L.Nesom; Helodeaster helenae (C.N.Forbes & Lydgate) G.L.Nesom; Helodeaster maviensis (H.Mann) G.L.Nesom

= Helodeaster =

Genus of flowering plants

Helodeaster is a genus of flowering plants in the sunflower family, Asteraceae. It includes three species endemic to the Hawaiian Islands.

- Helodeaster erici (C.N.Forbes) G.L.Nesom – Kauai
- Helodeaster helenae (C.N.Forbes & Lydgate) G.L.Nesom – Kauai
- Helodeaster maviensis (H.Mann) G.L.Nesom – Maui and southern Molokai
