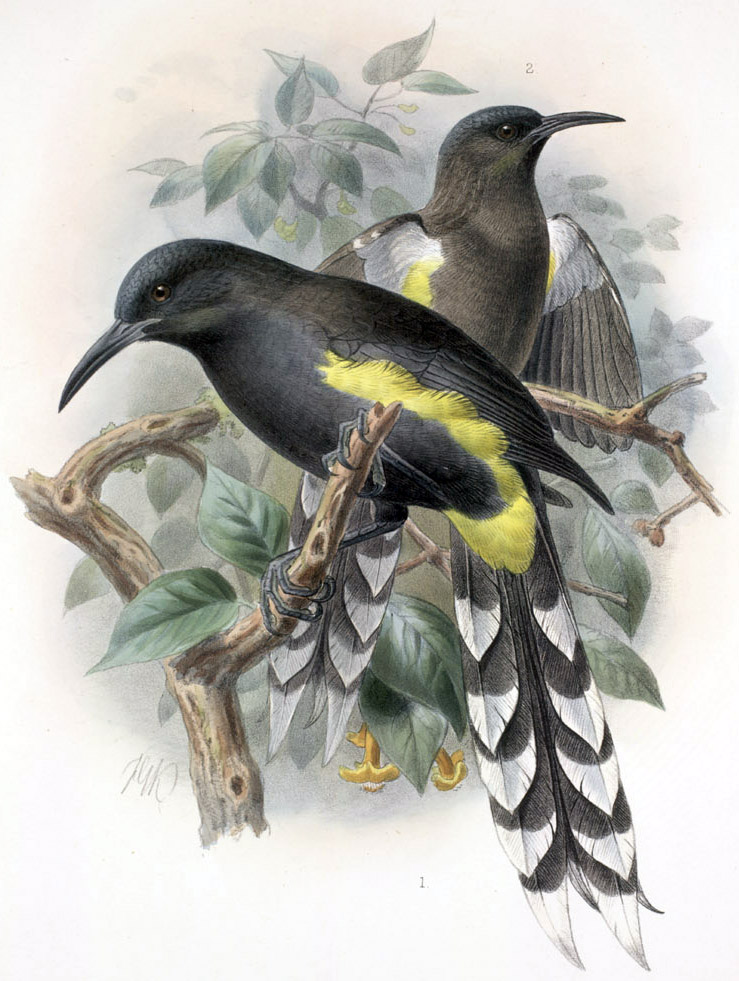

Conservation status
- Extinct (1839) (IUCN 3.1)

Scientific classification
- Kingdom: Animalia
- Phylum: Chordata
- Class: Aves
- Order: Passeriformes
- Family: †Mohoidae
- Genus: †Moho
- Species: †M. apicalis

Binomial name
- †Moho apicalis Gould, 1861
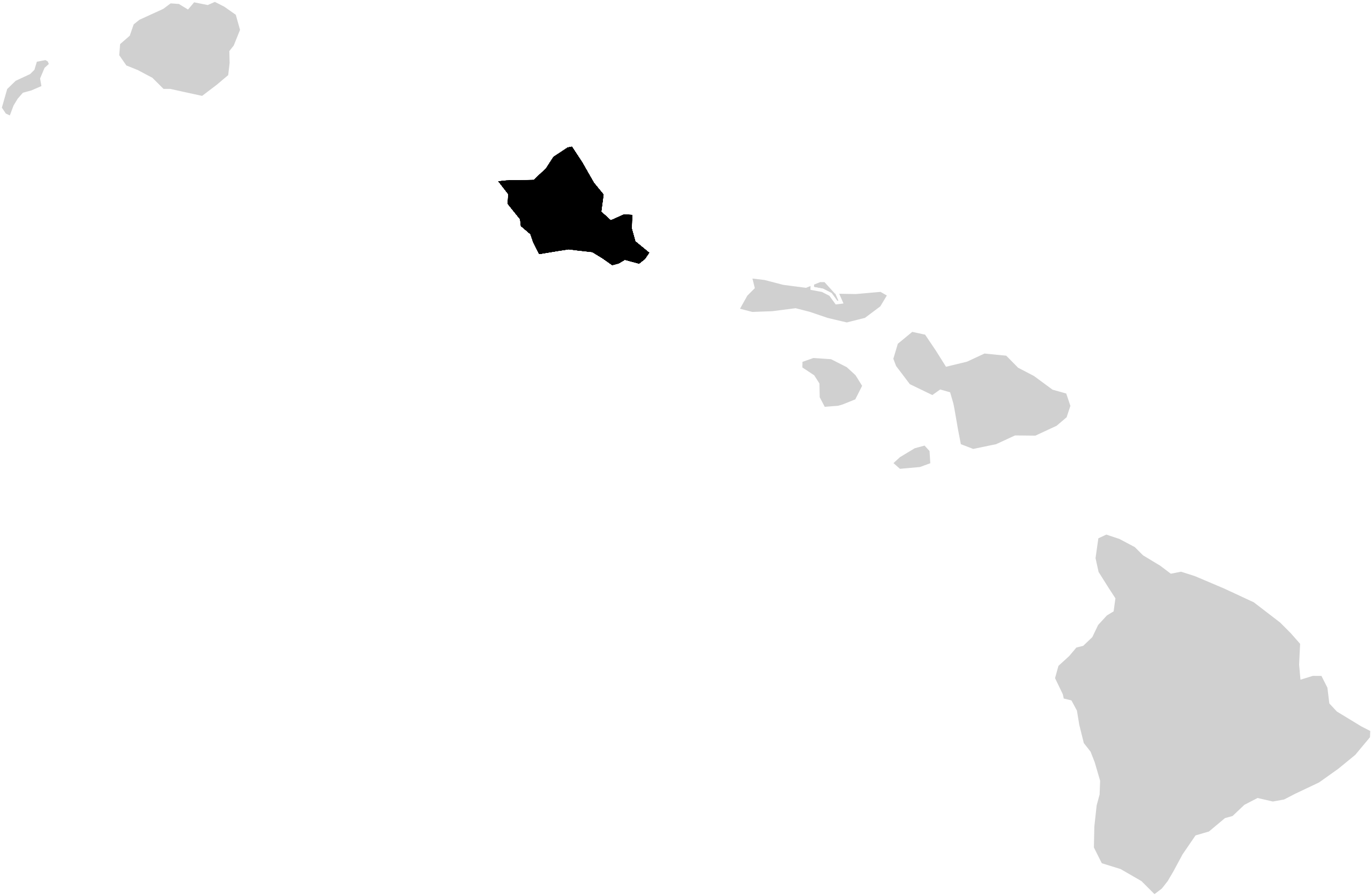

= Oʻahu ʻōʻō =

Extinct species of bird

The Oʻahu ʻōʻō (Moho apicalis) is an extinct species of Hawaiian honeyeater in the genus Moho. It was previously regarded as member of the Australo-Pacific honeyeaters (Meliphagidae), and was endemic to Oʻahu.

== Description ==
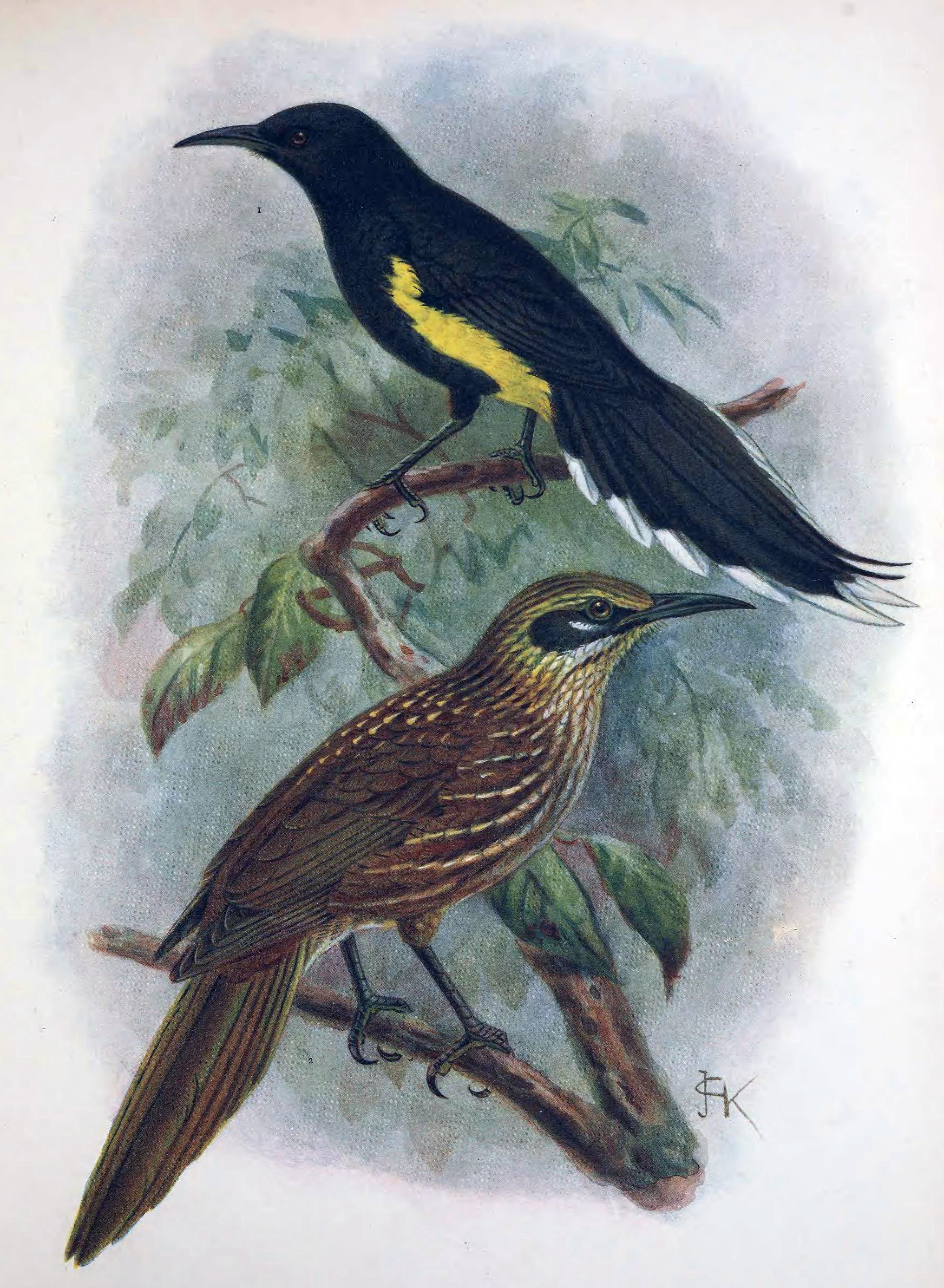
Moho apicalis (above) and Chaetoptila angustipluma (below)

The males reached a length of 30.5 centimeters. The wing length was 10.5 to 11.4 centimeters, the culmen was between 3.5 and 3.8 centimeters and the tarsus was between 3.4 and 3.8 centimeters. The females were smaller. The plumage was predominantly sooty black. The tail feathers were brown and had, with the exception of the two central tail feathers, white tips. Further characteristics were the white feather tufts under the axillaries and the two narrow central tail feathers which changed into fine hair-like or fibrous tips. The flanks and the undertail coverts were colored deeply yellow. The bill and the tarsus were black. It possessed a specialized tongue that was used for extracting various floral nectars from different flower species and had a thin, black bill that gently bent downward. Its biology was not well-studied.

== Behavior ==
Due to being the first Moho species to go extinct so early, historical documents towards the bird are limited. However, it is believed that its traits are similar to the other three species in the Moho genus. Its behavior was believed to also have been similar to another extinct relative, the kioea.

== Distribution and habitat ==
Its habitat was the wet mountain forests on Oʻahu. When specimens of Oʻahu ʻōʻō were found, they were collected scattered throughout the Koʻolau Range, until two zoologists, Olson and James, found subfossils of the birds at Barber's Point, which could point to the fact that these species' historical range may have extended across Oʻahu entirely.

== Extinction ==
The Oʻahu ʻōʻō was first mentioned by Andrew Bloxam. While in the Hawaiian Islands in 1825 (as the naturalist on board HMS Blonde), he saw live specimens of the bird which were brought to him by locals. He preserved one specimen. He wrote in his diary (not published until much later): "They are now very scarce in all the islands. I did not see even one in the different excursions I made, & the natives asked a high price for the very few they brought to me." Bloxam misidentified the birds as the related species Moho nobilis.

John Gould scientifically named and described the Oʻahu ʻōʻō in 1860, when it was already regarded as extinct for 23 years. The last reliable evidence of the species was a collection of three specimens that were taken from Nu'uanu Valley by German naturalist Ferdinand Deppe between 11-15 January 1837, in the hills behind the capital, Honolulu.

After surveys led by ornithologist Robert C. L. Perkins and others failed to find the bird between 1880 and 1890, it was described as extinct. Today, there are seven specimens in museum collections in Berlin, London, New York City, and Cambridge, Massachusetts.

The reasons for its extinction were probably avian diseases caused by introduced mosquitos, habitat destruction by overgrazing from livestock and deforestation. It is also highly probable that it was caused through overhunting, and from predator species that hunted for its kind.

== Cultural significance ==
During the pre-contact days, early Hawaiians used feathers from birds such as the Oʻahu ʻōʻō for clothing, especially for royal capes and headdresses. The common people also gathered feathers loosely into small tied bunches for tax payments to the ruling class.
