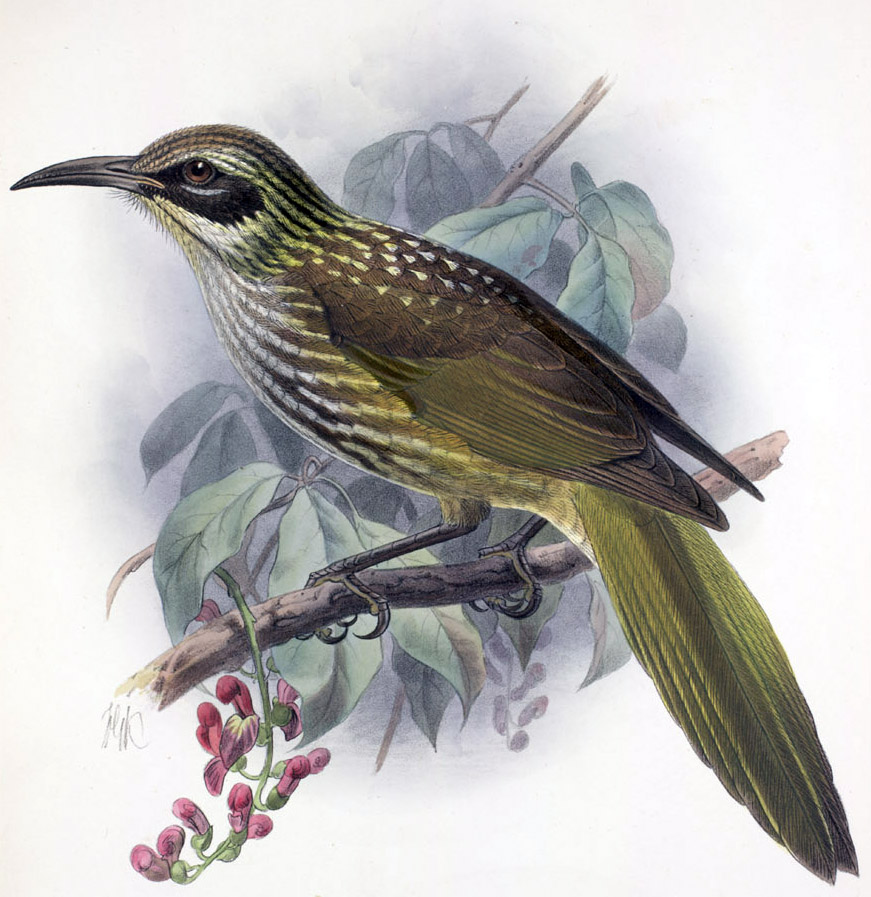
- Illustration by Keulemans

Conservation status
- Extinct (1859) (IUCN 3.1)

- Presumed Extinct (1859) (NatureServe)

Scientific classification
- Kingdom: Animalia
- Phylum: Chordata
- Class: Aves
- Order: Passeriformes
- Family: †Mohoidae
- Genus: †Chaetoptila; G.R. Gray, 1869
- Species: †C. angustipluma

Binomial name
- †Chaetoptila angustipluma (Peale, 1849)
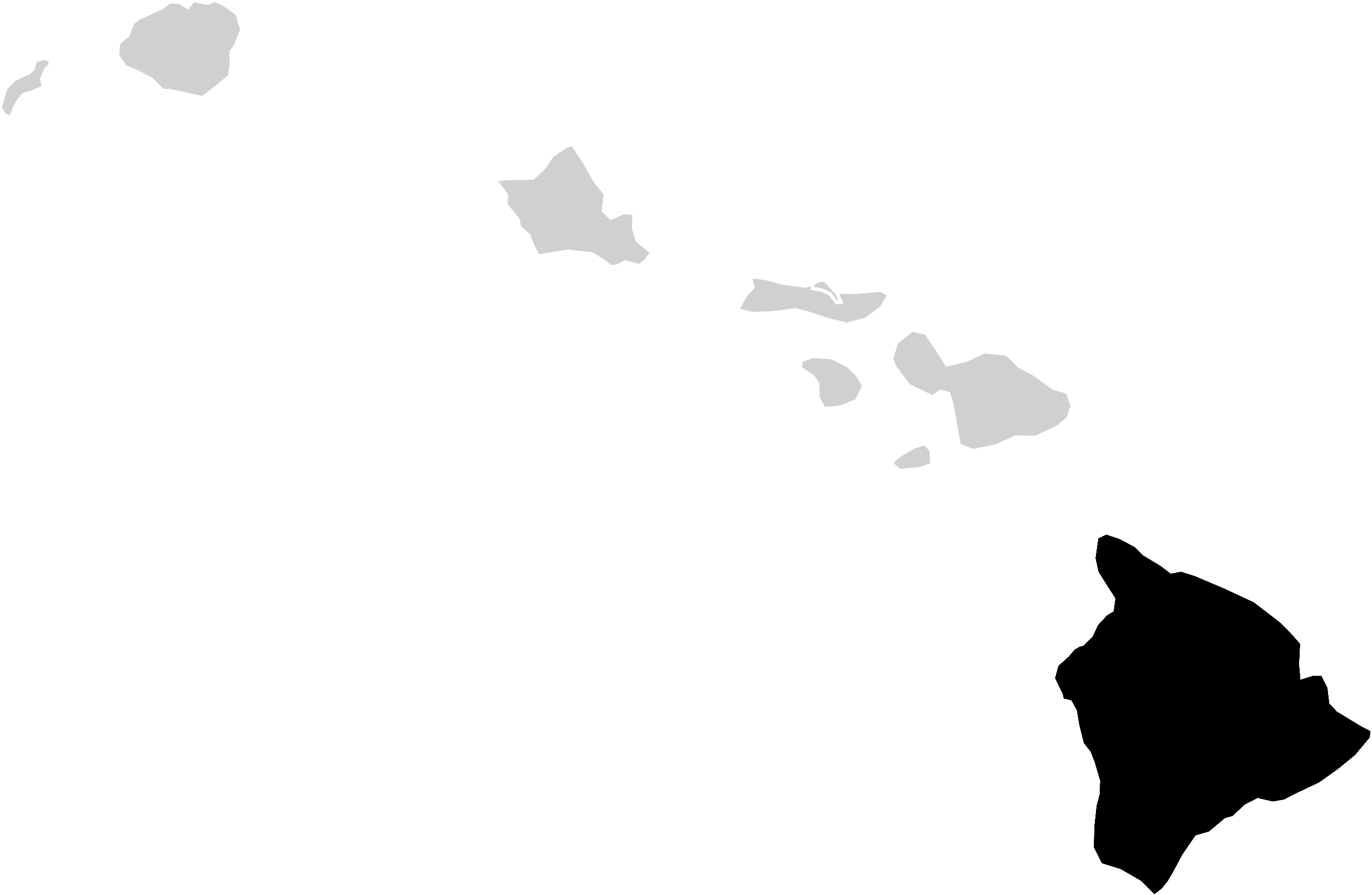

= Kioea =

Extinct species of bird

The kioea or kiowea (Chaetoptila angustipluma) is an extinct species of Hawaiian honeyeater that was endemic to the islands of Hawaii before going extinct around the mid-19th century.

== Description ==
The kioea was a large bird, about 33 cm (13 in) long, with a long, slightly curved bill. What distinguished the kioea from other honeyeaters was the broad black stripe on its face, and bristle-like feathers on the head and breast. The Hawaiian word "kioea" literally means "stand tall", though its relation to the bird's behavior is unknown.

== Taxonomy ==
Although all four known specimens are from the island of Hawaiʻi, fossil records show that related birds existed on other Hawaiian islands as well. The Oahu kioea (Chaetoptila cf. angustipluma) was found on Oahu, Maui and possibly other islands north of Oahu and has an unresolved taxonomic status within the genus Chaetoptila, while the narrow-billed kioea (?Chaetoptila sp.) was found on Maui and possibly others and is more distinct, possibly not warranting a placement in Chaetoptila at all.

Until recently, this species and the birds in the genus Moho were thought to belong to the family Meliphagidae (honeyeaters) because they looked and acted so similar to members of that family, including many morphological details. A 2008 study argued, on the basis of a phylogenetic analysis of DNA from museum specimens, that the genera Moho and Chaetoptila do not belong to the Meliphagidae (and only resemble them due to convergent evolution), but instead belong to a group that includes the waxwings and the palmchat; they appear especially close to the silky-flycatchers. The authors proposed a family, Mohoidae, for these two extinct genera. More recent studies support the family Mohoidae as being the sister group to the hypocolius of the family Hypocoliidae.

== Extinction ==
The kioea was seemingly in decline even before the first arrival on Hawaiʻi by Europeans, since even native Hawaiians were (and are) seemingly unfamiliar with the bird. The feathers of the kioea were not used in Hawaiian featherwork, nor is it mentioned in any chants or legends. Only four specimens exist in museums. The cause of its extinction is mostly attributed to logging of its habitat (the Hawaiian tropical rainforests), hunting, and the introduction of predators like feral cats, dogs, and pigs.

== Gallery ==
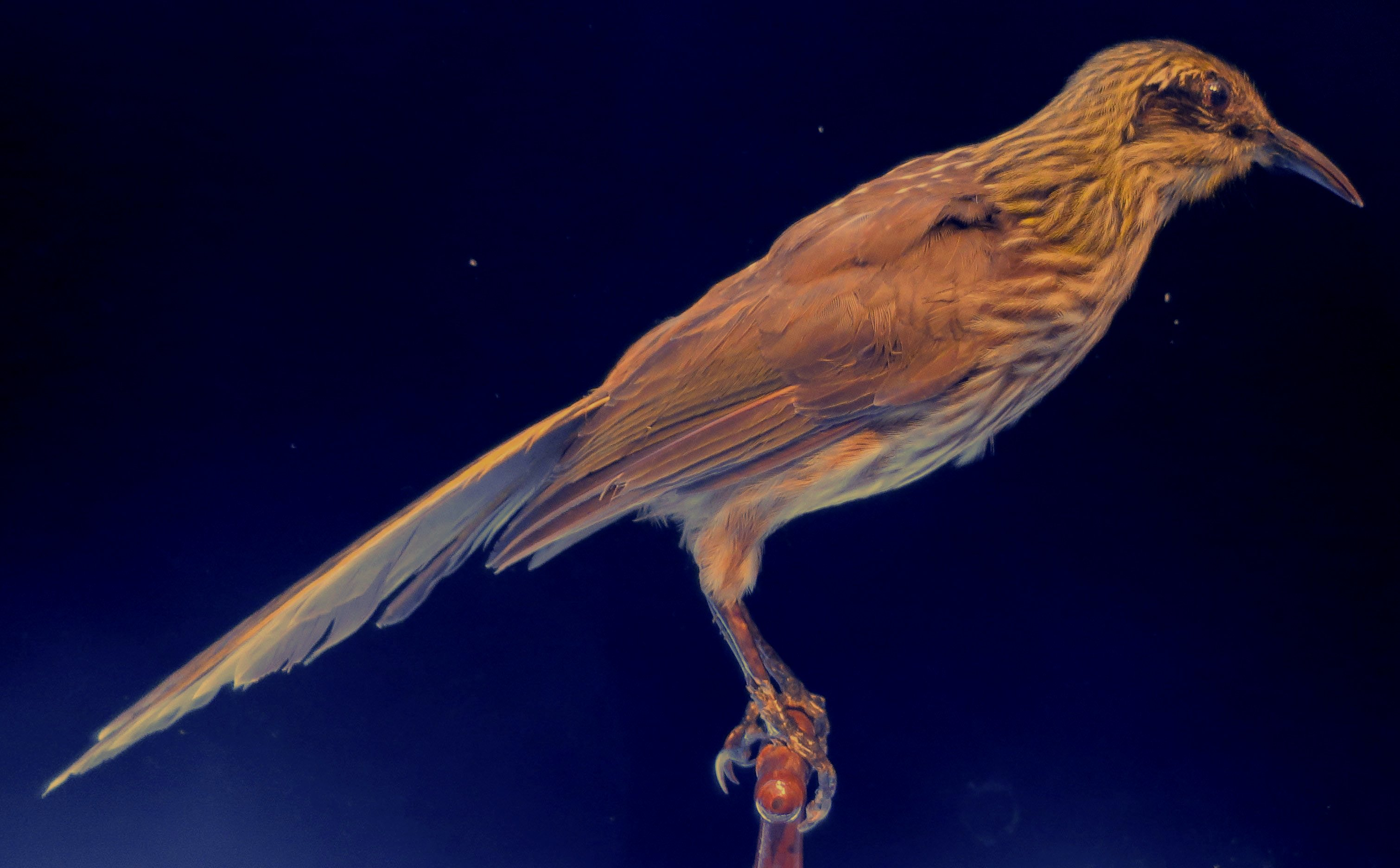
Stuffed specimen

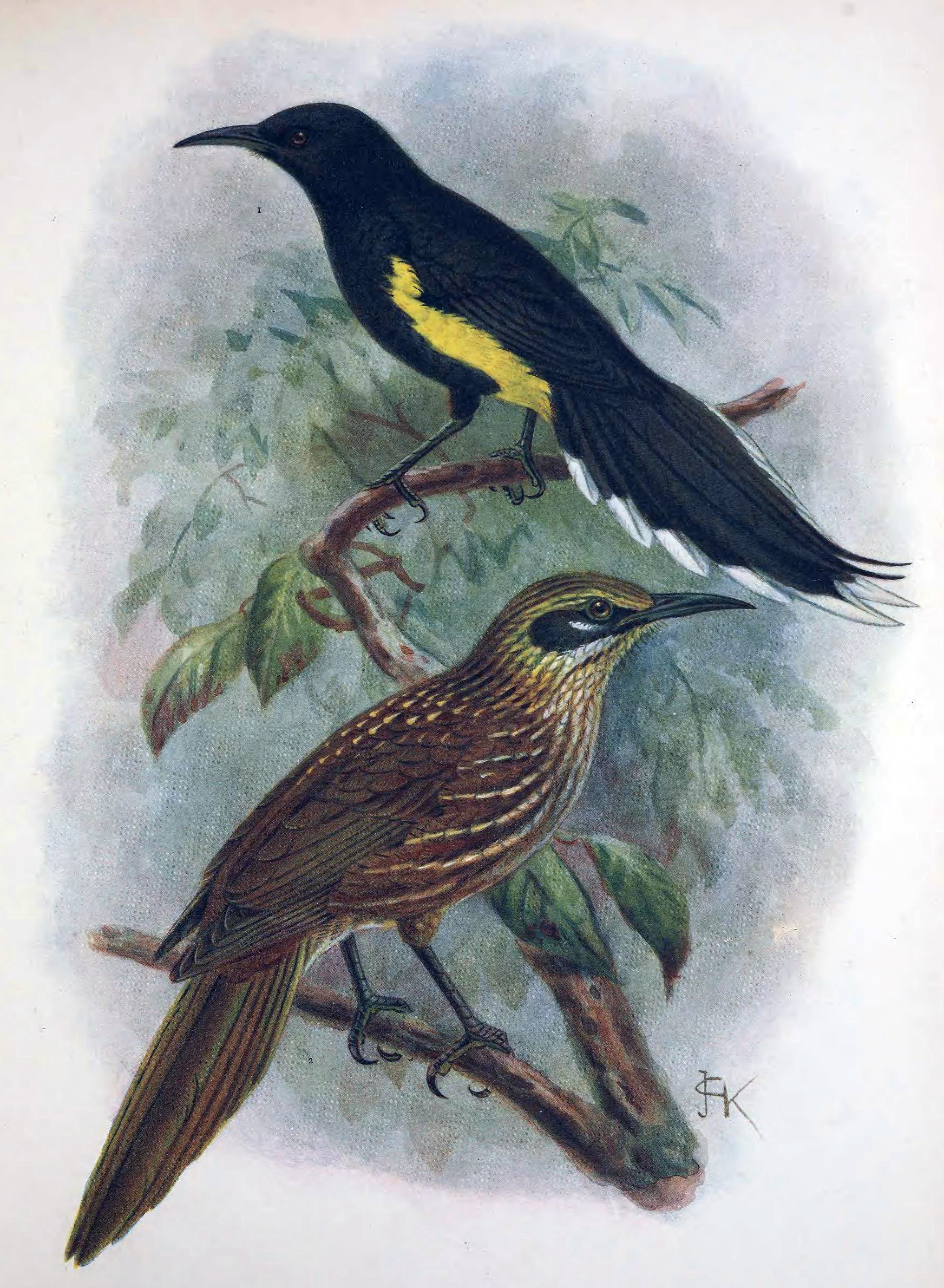
Moho apicalis (above) and Chaetoptila angustipluma
