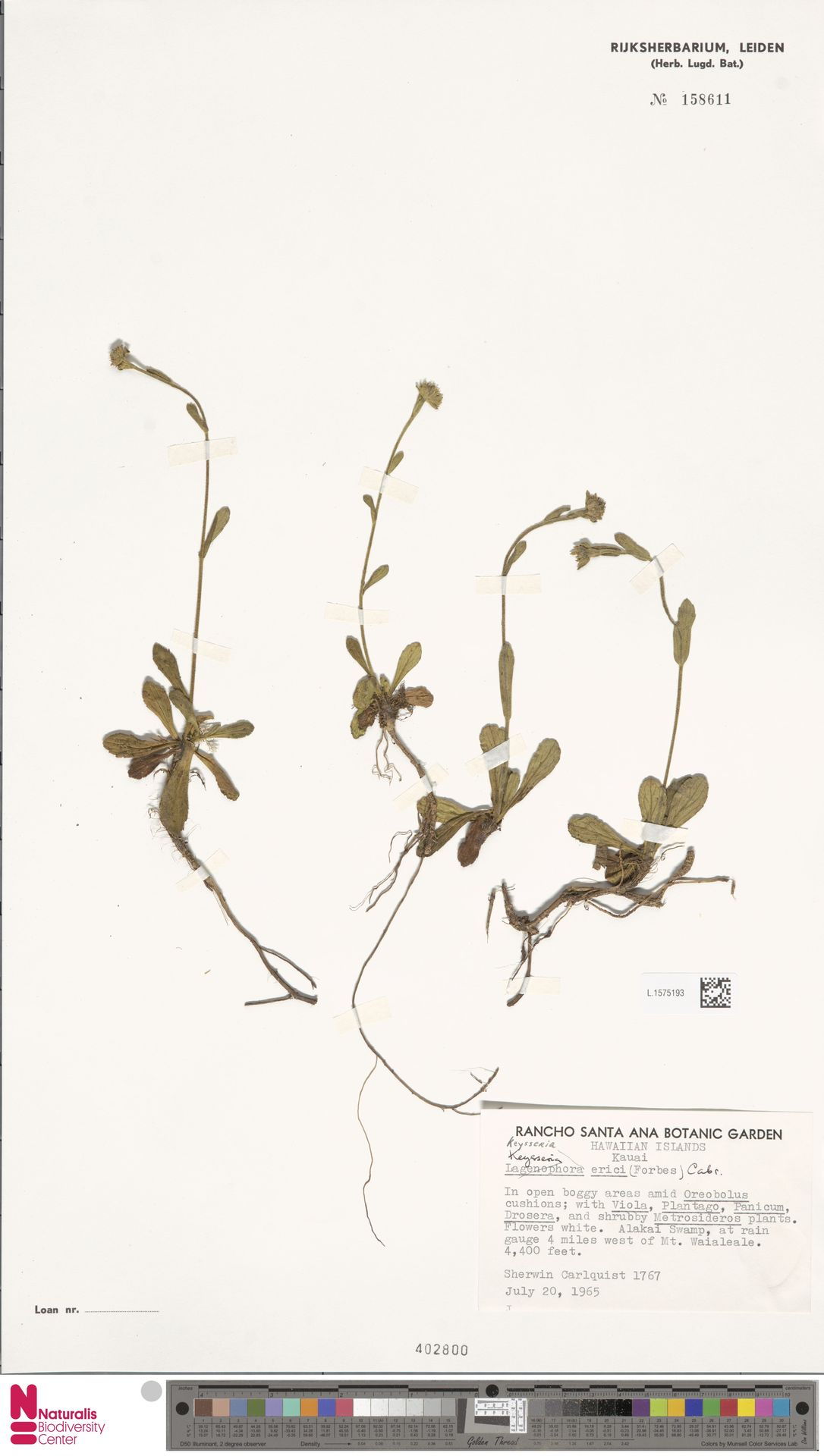

Scientific classification
- Kingdom: Plantae
- Clade: Tracheophytes
- Clade: Angiosperms
- Clade: Eudicots
- Clade: Asterids
- Order: Asterales
- Family: Asteraceae
- Genus: Helodeaster
- Species: H. erici

Binomial name
- Helodeaster erici (C.N.Forbes) G.L.Nesom (2020)

Synonyms
- Keysseria erici (C.N.Forbes) Cabrera (1967); Lagenophora erici C.N.Forbes (1918)

= Helodeaster erici =

Species of plant

Helodeaster erici is a species of flowering plant from the genus Helodeaster. It is endemic to the island of Kauai in the Hawaiian Islands.

The species was originally described by Charles Noyes Forbes as Lagenophora erici in 1918. In 2020 Guy L. Nesom placed it in the new Hawaiian endemic genus Helodeaster.
