= Mount Waiʻaleʻale =

Volcano in the Hawaiian Islands

Waiʻaleʻale
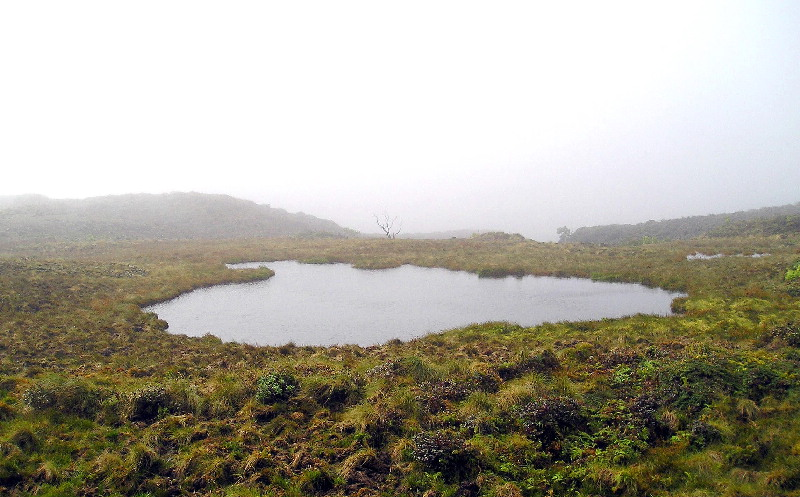
- Waiʻaleʻale (or 'Rippling Waters') Lake, the namesake of Mount Waiʻaleʻale.

Highest point
- Elevation: 1,569 m (5,148 ft)
- Prominence: 1,569 m (5,148 ft)
- Coordinates: 22°04′26″N 159°29′55″W

Geography
- Location within Hawaii
- Location: Kauai, Hawaii, United States

Mount Waiʻaleʻale (/ˌwaɪˌɑːleɪˈɑːleɪ/) is a shield volcano and the second highest point on the island of Kauaʻi in the Hawaiian Islands. Its name literally means "rippling water" or "overflowing water".

Mount Waiʻaleʻale, at an elevation of 5,148 feet (1,569 m), averages more than 373 inches (9,500 mm) of rain a year since 1912, with a record 683 inches (17,300 mm) in 1982; its summit is one of the rainiest spots on earth. However, recent reports mention that over the period 1978–2007 the wettest spot in Hawaii is Big Bog on Maui (404 inches or 10,300 mm per year).

== Climate ==
=== Climate and rainfall statistics ===
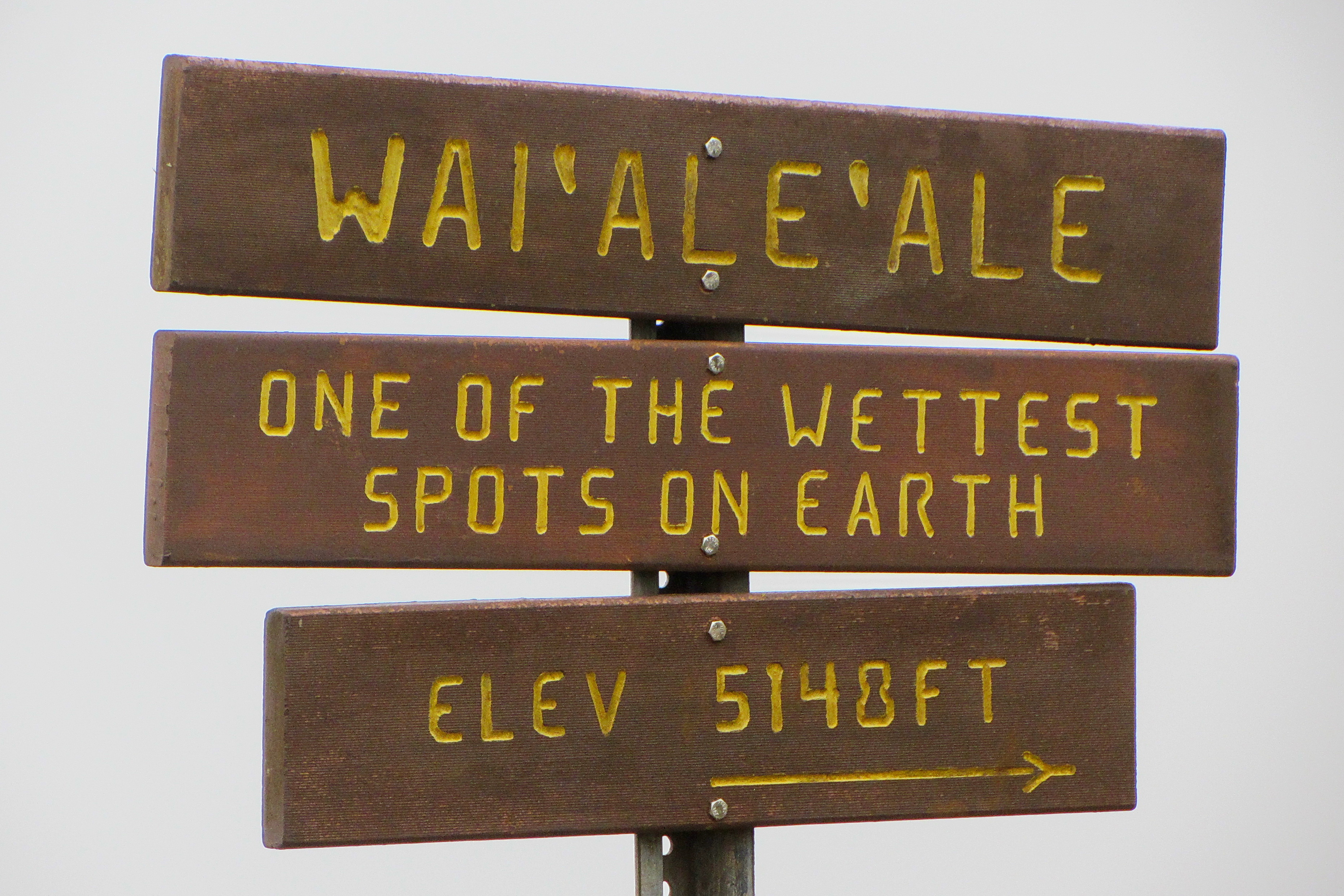
Sign at the park saying it is "one of the wettest spots on Earth"

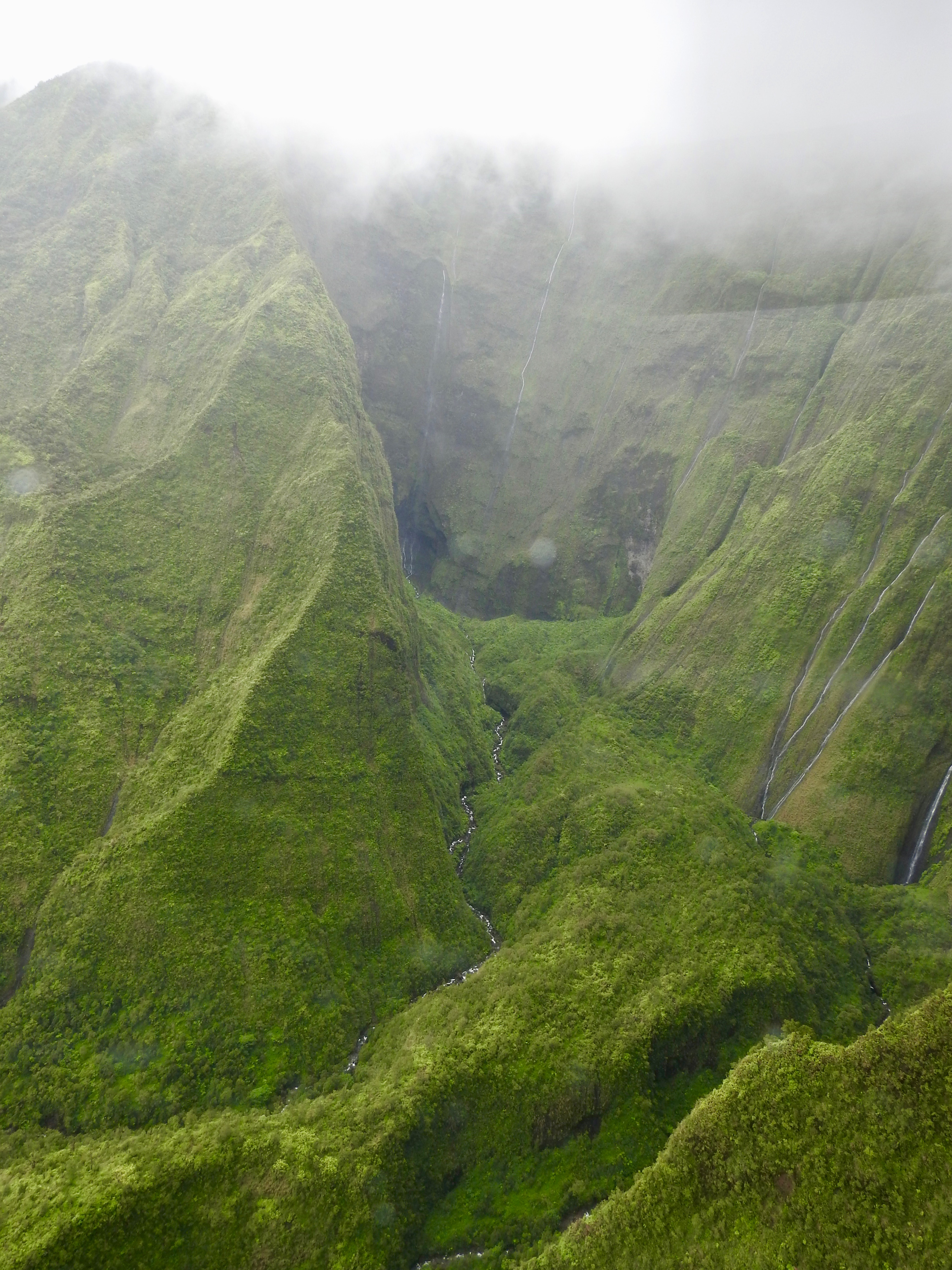
Waterfalls around the caldera

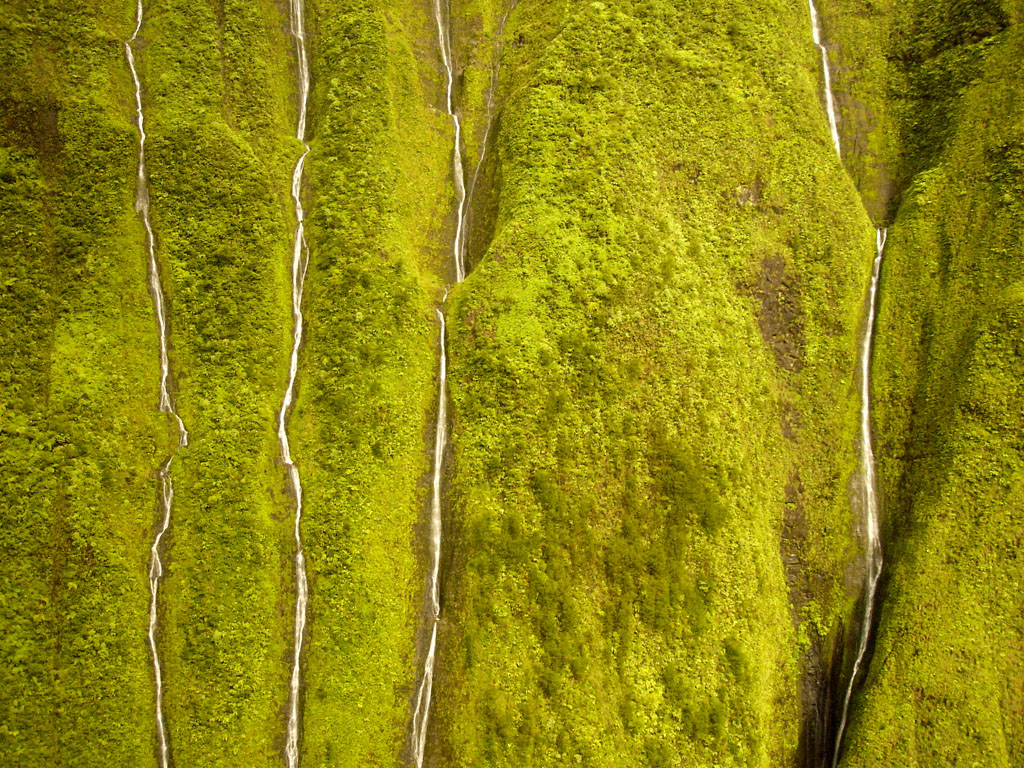
The "Wall of Tears" in the crater of Mount Waialeale

The summit of Waiʻaleʻale features a tropical rainforest climate (Köppen Af), with substantial rainfall throughout the course of the year. (Bodin 1978: 272) quotes 460.0 inches (11,684 mm) per year figure as being the 1912–1945 average, an average that quite possibly will have changed since then, while The National Climatic Data Center quotes this figure as a 30-year average. The Weather Network and The Guinness Book of Weather Records quotes 451.0 inches (11,455 mm) rain per year, while Meteorology Today quotes 460 inches (11,680 mm) as the average annual rainfall at Mount Waialeale and De Wereld van het Weer claims 510 inches (13,000 mm) falls here. Similarly, The Weather Network and the Guinness Book of Weather Records quote 335 days with rain here, while Weird Weather suggests that rain falls on 360 days per year.

The local tourist industry of Kauai has promoted it as one of the wettest places on earth, which it is. The rainfall at Waiʻaleʻale is evenly distributed through the year.

Climate data for Mount Waialeale
Month	Jan	Feb	Mar	Apr	May	Jun	Jul	Aug	Sep	Oct	Nov	Dec	Year
Average rainfall inches (mm)	24.78 (629)	24.63 (626)	27.24 (692)	47.24 (1,200)	28.34 (720)	30.65 (779)	35.87 (911)	32.75 (832)	24.14 (613)	31.76 (807)	36.33 (923)	30.10 (765)	373.83 (9,495)
Average rainy days (≥ 0.01 in)	20	17	20	26	27	27	29	29	27	27	21	21	289
Source: NOAA

=== Causes ===
Several factors give the summit of Waiʻaleʻale more potential to create precipitation than the rest of the island chain:

1. Its northern position relative to the main Hawaiian Islands provides more exposure to frontal systems that bring rain during the winter.
2. Its peak lies just below the so-called trade wind inversion layer of 6,000 feet (1,800 m), above which trade-wind-produced clouds cannot rise.
3. The summit plateau is flanked by steep walled valleys over 3,000 feet (910 m) deep on the three sides most consistently exposed to moisture bearing weather systems. These serve to funnel and concentrate any available precipitable water directly towards the mountain.
4. The steep cliffs of the mountain's flanks generate intense orographic lift, causing the moisture-laden air to rise rapidly – over 4,000 feet (1,200 m) in less than 0.5 miles (0.80 km) – This combined with the 'barrier' of the trade-wind inversion, serves to very efficiently squeeze almost all of the moisture out of the incoming clouds directly over and immediately downwind of the peak.

== Ecology ==
The great rainfall in the area produces the Alakaʻi Wilderness Preserve, a large boggy area that is home to many rare plants. The ground is so wet that although trails exist, access by foot to the Waiʻaleʻale area is extremely difficult.

A number of rare local plant species are named for this mountain, including Astelia waialealae, Melicope waialealae, and the endemic Dubautia waialealae.

== See also ==
- Big Bog, Maui

== Sources ==
- Ahrens, C.D. (2000), Meteorology Today, Brooks/Cole, ISBN 0-534-39776-X
- Bodin, S. (1978), Weather and Climate, Blandford, ISBN 0-7137-0858-1
- Holford, I. (1977), The Guinness Book of Weather Records, Book Club Associates
- Kroll, E. (1995), De Wereld van het Weer, Teleac
- Pukui, Mary Kawena; Elbert, Samuel H.; Mookini, Esther T. (1974). Place names of Hawaii (2nd ed.). University of Hawaii Press. ISBN 978-0-8248-0524-1. "Place Names of Hawaii."
- Simons, P. (1996), Weird Weather, Little Brown and Company
