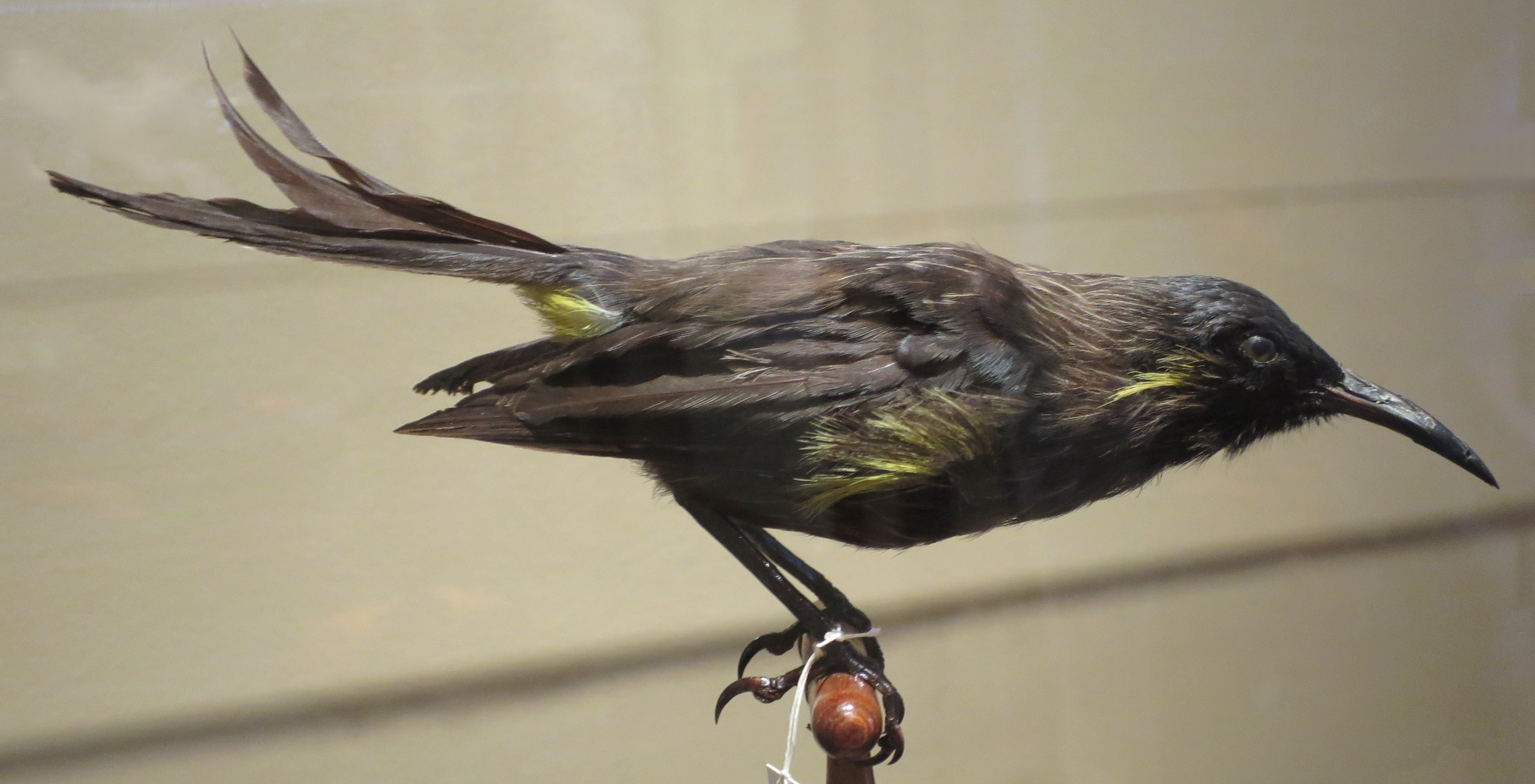
- Specimen in Bishop Museum, Honolulu

Conservation status
- Extinct (1981) (IUCN 3.1)

Scientific classification
- Kingdom: Animalia
- Phylum: Chordata
- Class: Aves
- Order: Passeriformes
- Family: †Mohoidae
- Genus: †Moho
- Species: †M. bishopi

Binomial name
- †Moho bishopi (Rothschild, 1893)
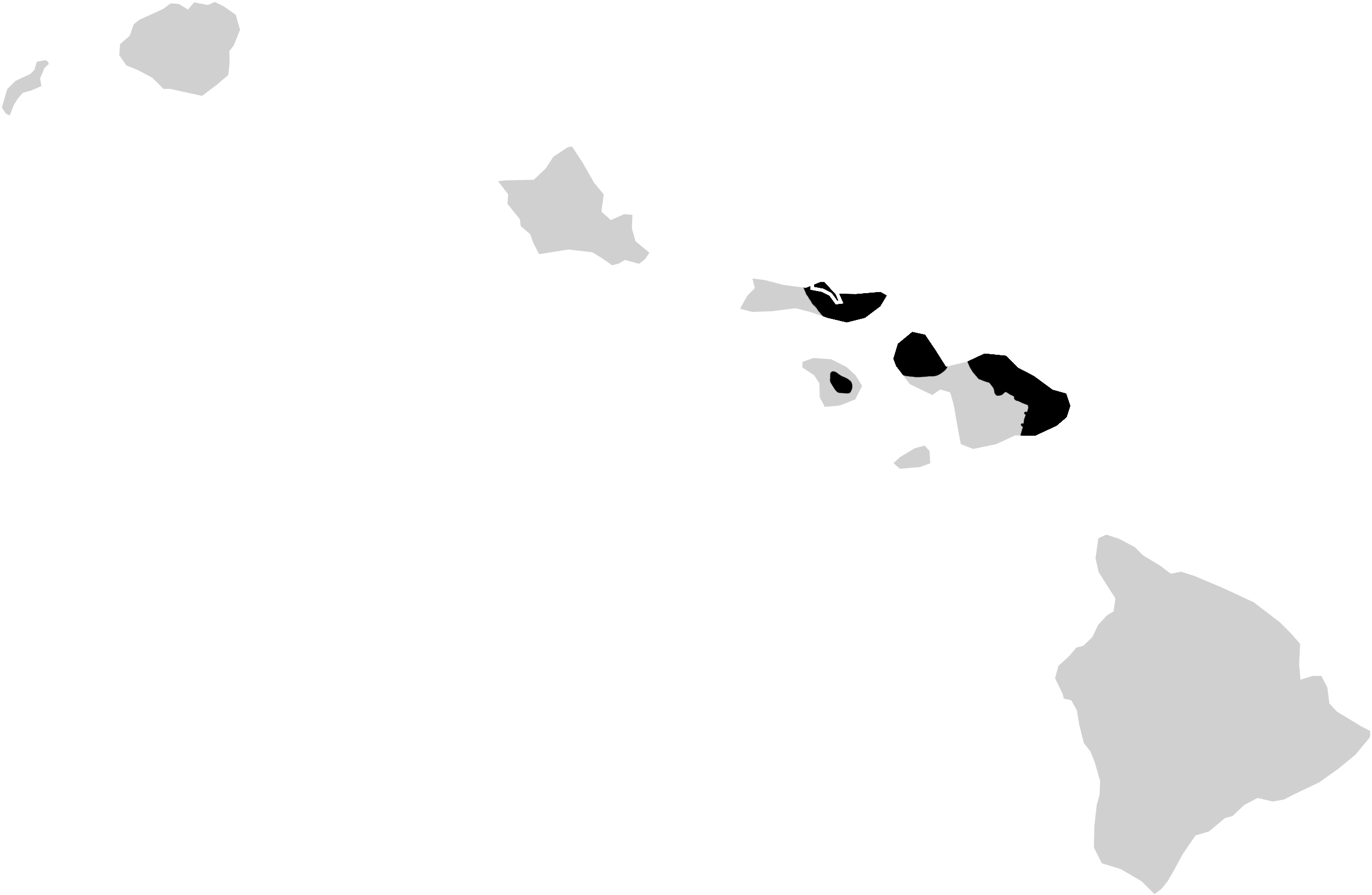

Synonyms
- Acrulocercus bishopi

= Bishop's ʻōʻō =

Extinct species of bird

Bishop's ʻōʻō or the Molokai ʻōʻō (Moho bishopi) is an extinct species of Hawaiian honeyeater. The penultimate member of the family, it went extinct six years before the Kauaʻi ʻōʻō. It was previously regarded as member of the Australo-Pacific honeyeaters (Meliphagidae). Lionel Walter Rothschild named it after Charles Reed Bishop, the founder of the Bishop Museum.

== Description ==
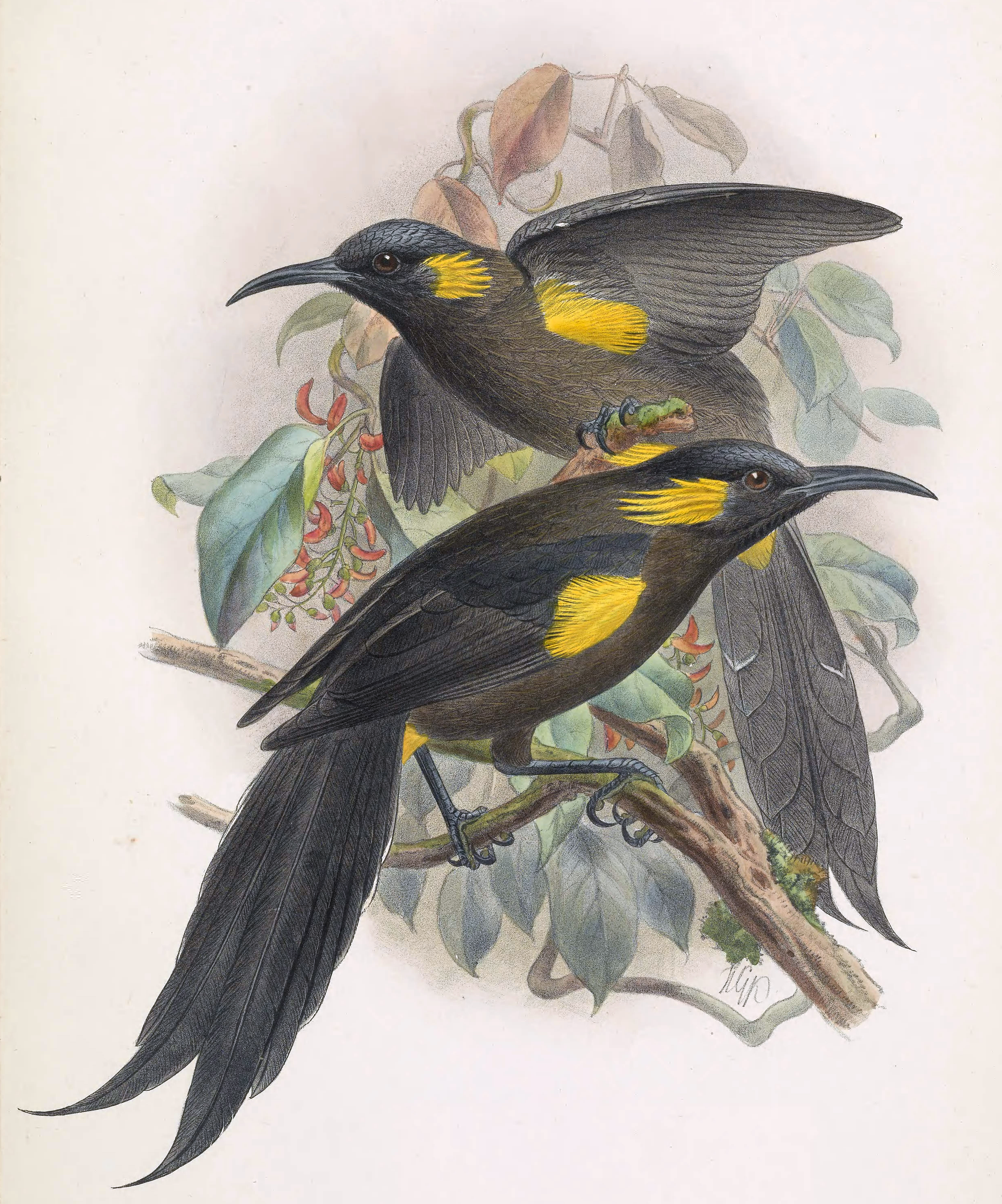
Male and female Moho bishopi

It was discovered in 1892 by Henry C. Palmer, a bird collector for Lord Rothschild. Its length was about 29 centimeters. The tail had reached a length of 10 centimeters. The plumage was general glossy black with yellow feather tufts on the maxillaries, beneath the wings and the undertail coverts. Their songs were simple two notes, took-took, which could be heard for miles.

== Distribution ==
It was endemic to the montane forests of the Hawaiian islands of Molokai, Maui, and Lanai. Subfossil bone finds from Maui (on Mount Olinda at about 4,500 ft above sea level) are sometimes referred to in literature as the Maui ʻōʻō.

== Ecology ==
Little is known about its ecology. It fed on nectar from the flowers of Hawaiian lobelioids, much like other members of its family.

== Extinction ==
Causes of the bird's extinction include deforestation, predation by introduced predators (such as the black rat), clearing of land for agriculture and livestock grazing, and diseases which were introduced by mosquitoes. It was seen in 1904 by ornithologist George Campbell Munro. In 1915, Munro tried to verify reports of eventual sightings but he never found live individuals again. The last sighting was by Dr. Stephen Sabo in 1981.

== Purported Maui Sightings ==
Reports of an ʻōʻō on Maui have been catalogued since 1828. In 1902, Henshaw reported seeing a bird matching the appearance of Bishop's ʻōʻō in the Olinda region. A spat of sightings of a bird with field marks and calls matching Bishop's ʻōʻō was reported in the 1980's from the Koʻolau Nature Reserve, most notably by Stephen R. Sabo in 1981. Subfossil remains of an ʻōʻō are known from Maui, so it is not implausible Bishop's ʻōʻō may have occurred here and evaded detection due to Maui being overlooked by 19th and 20th century collectors.

== See also ==
- Mo-Ho-Bish-O-Pi - a Welsh indie rock group named in honor of the bird.
