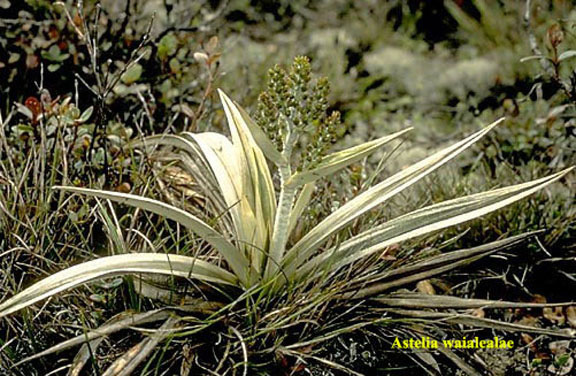

Conservation status
- Critically Endangered (IUCN 3.1)

- Critically Imperiled (NatureServe)

Scientific classification
- Kingdom: Plantae
- Clade: Tracheophytes
- Clade: Angiosperms
- Clade: Monocots
- Order: Asparagales
- Family: Asteliaceae
- Genus: Astelia
- Species: A. waialealae

Binomial name
- Astelia waialealae Wawra

Synonyms
- Funckia waialealae (Wawra) Kuntze

= Astelia waialealae =

Species of flowering plant

Astelia waialealae is a rare species of plant in the Asteliaceae family that is endemic to the island of Kauaʻi in Hawaii, United States. It inhabits montane bogs within the vicinity of the Alakaʻi Swamp on the island's central plateau. A. waialealae is threatened by habitat loss and habit disturbance by feral pigs; there are only about 26 plants remaining. It is a federally listed endangered species.
