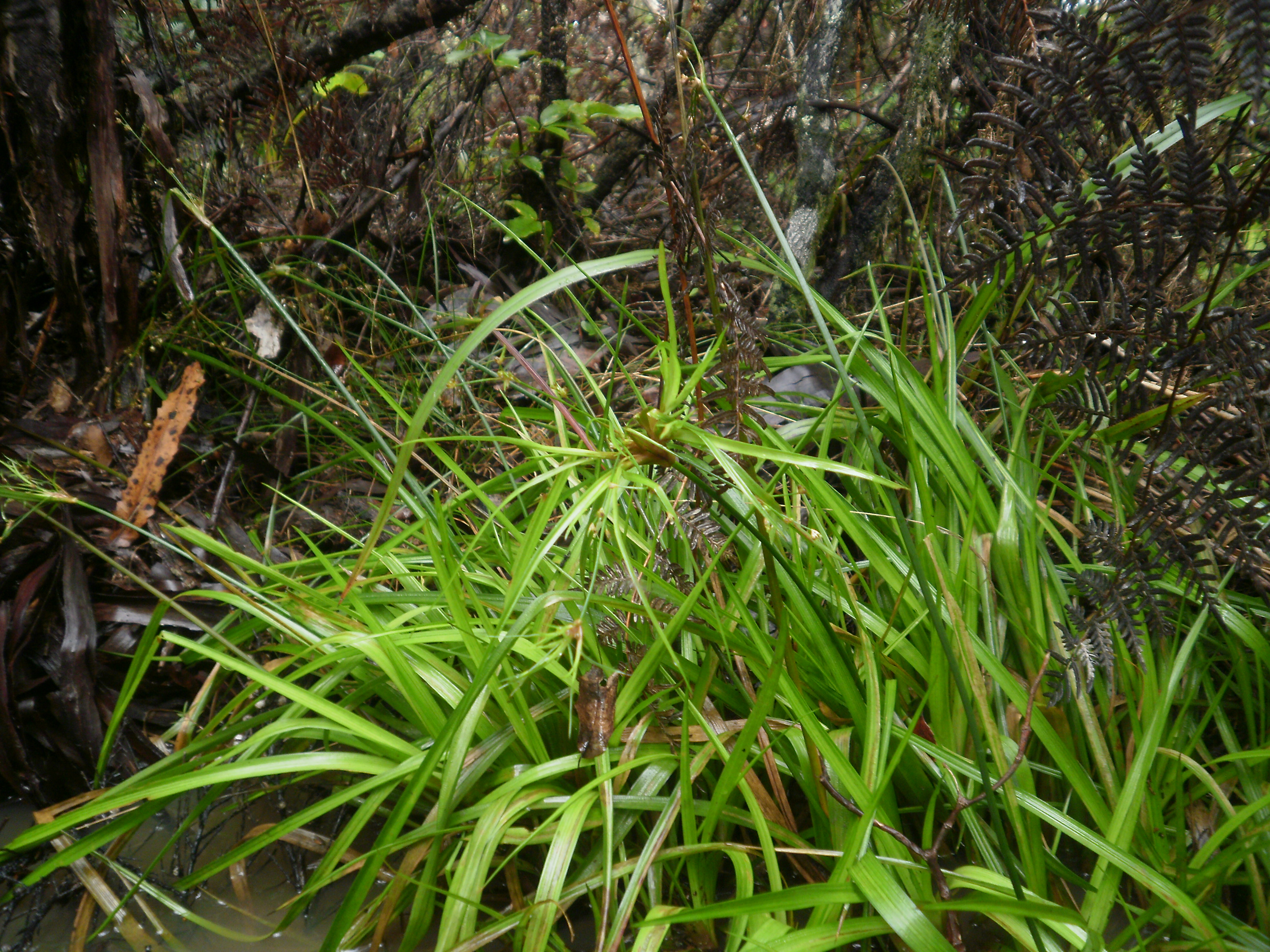

Scientific classification
- Kingdom: Plantae
- Clade: Tracheophytes
- Clade: Angiosperms
- Clade: Monocots
- Clade: Commelinids
- Order: Poales
- Family: Juncaceae
- Genus: Juncus
- Species: J. planifolius

Binomial name
- Juncus planifolius R.Br.

= Juncus planifolius =

Species of plant

Juncus planifolius is a species of rush, commonly known as broadleaf rush, broad-leaved rush, or grass-leaved rush. It naturally occurs in Australia, New Zealand, Hawaii and South America.

In New Zealand J. planifolius is found in open, wet ground, and can be typically found on exposed clay, beside tracks or drains.

Recently, J. planifolius has been introduced to the northern hemisphere. It was found in Hawai'i in 1930 and has spread to most of the islands. The species arrived in Ireland by 1973. It is now well established on Pacific coast of North America, where the plant was first collected in Oregon in 1980. The first California record was in 2008, but populations were probably well established before then. Juncus planifolius may have arrived as a contaminant in vines planted in commercial cranberry bogs, but is now spreading in native coastal bogs, where it may displace native plants.

In North America, it is recognized by its unbranched stems, basal leaves with no sharp demarcation of sheath and blade, and blackish tepals.
