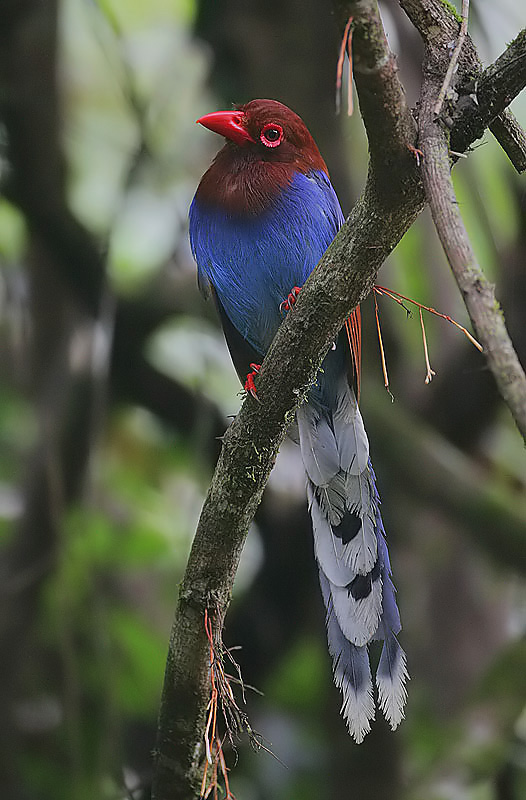
- A Sri Lanka blue magpie (Urocissa ornata), representing suborder Passeri, the Songbirds or Oscines.
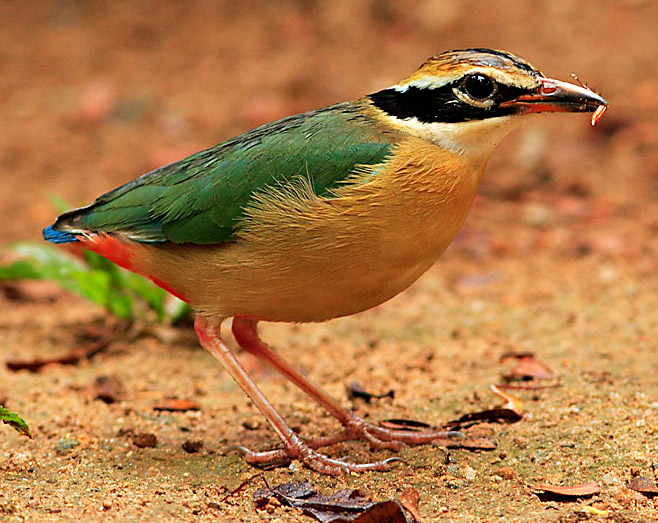
- An Indian pitta (Pitta brachyura), representing suborder Tyranni, the Suboscines.

Scientific classification
- Kingdom: Animalia
- Phylum: Chordata
- Class: Aves
- Order: Passeriformes
- Clade: Eupasseres; Ericson, et al. (2002)

Suborders
- Passeri; Tyranni; Sister: Acanthisitti

= Eupasserine =

Clade of birds

Eupasserines are passerines in the clade Eupasseres. The clade contains all passerines except the New Zealand wrens (Acanthisitti), to which they are sister.

The origin of the word is the prefix 'eu-', meaning 'true' or 'genuine', and 'passeres', referring to passerines. So Eupasseres means 'true passerines', as an exception to the ancient lineage of Acanthisitti.

== Systematics ==
They contain all the families of passerine but one, Acanthisittidae, and all the species except the 6 recognised New Zealand wrens.

- Passeriformes
  - - Acanthisitti
      - Acanthisittidae
  - Eupasseres
    - Tyranni
      - Eurylaimides
      - Tyrannides
    - Passeri
      - 10 uncategorized families
      - - Corvides
        - Passerides

Source for cladogram:

=== Suboscines (Tyranni) ===
They are the suboscines, which have different syrinx structures than songbirds. They include the Old world suboscines and the American Sapayoa in infraorder Eurylamides, while all other suboscines, all exclusively in the New world, are found in the infraorder Tyrannides. They consist of around 1000 species and 16 families, and consist of the largest bird family, Tyrant flycatchers (Tyrannidae), with around 400 species.

Phylogenetic relationships of the Eurylaimides based on Oliveros et al. (2019):

- Eurylaimides
  - - Philepittidae (asites)
    - Eurylaimidae (eurylaimid broadbills)
  - - Calyptomenidae (African and green broadbills)
    - - Sapayoidae (sapayoa)
      - Pittidae (pittas)

Phylogenetic relationships of the Tyrannides based on Oliveros et al. (2019):

- Tyrannides
  - Tyrannida
    - Pipridae (manakins)
    - - Cotingidae (cotingas)
      - - Tityridae (titras, becards)
        - Tyrannidae (tyrant flycatchers)
  - Furnariida
    - - Melanopareiidae (crescent chests)
      - - Conopophagidae (gnateaters)
        - Thamnophilidae (antbirds)
    - - Grallariidae (antpittas)
      - - Rhinocryptidae (tapaculos)
        - - Formicariidae (antthrushes)
          - Furnariidae (ovenbirds)

=== Songbirds/Oscines (Passeri) ===
They are the songbirds, some of which can produce elaborate birdsong. Some are true songbirds, which have a double larynx. Others can either only produce calls, or might sing without a double larynx. They consist of 10 uncategorized families, all endemic to Australia, New Guinea, or both, The infraorder Corvides with 4 uncategorized families, 3 superfamilies and 29 families in total, and the Passerides, with 78 families in total, 8 uncategorized families, 3 parvorders, 6 superfamilies, and 25 families in the parvorder Passerida which haven't been classified into superfamilies (in alternative taxonomy, The 2 infraorders become their own parvorders, and normal parvorders become superfamilies).

- - Passeri
    - Menurides
      - Atrichornithidae
      - Menuridae
    - Euoscines
      - Climacterides
        - Ptilonorhynchidae
        - Climacteridae
      - - Meliphagides
          - Maluridae
          - - Dasyornithidae
            - - Pardalotidae
              - Meliphagidae
        - - Orthonychides
            - Orthonychidae
            - Pomatostomidae
          - - Corvides
              - Cinclosomatidae
              - - Campephagidae
                - - - Neosittidae
                    - Mohouidae
                  - - Orioloidea
                      - Eulacestomidae
                      - - - Psophodidae
                          - - Falcunculidae
                            - Oreoicidae
                        - - - Paramythiidae
                            - - Vireonidae
                          - - Pachycephalidae
                            - Oriolidae
                    - - Malaconotoidea
                        - Machaerirhynchidae
                        - - Artamidae
                          - - Rhagologidae
                            - - - Platysteiridae
                                - Vangidae
                              - - Aegithinidae
                                - - Pityriaseidae
                                  - Malaconotidae
                      - Corvoidea
                        - ?Dicruridae
                        - - Rhipiduridae
                        - - - Monarchidae
                            - - Laniidae
                              - Corvidae
                          - - Ifritidae
                            - - Melampittidae
                              - - Corcoracidae
                                - Paradisaeidae
            - Passerides
              - Melanocharitida
                Melanocharitidae
              - - Cnemophilida
                  Cnemophilidae
                - - Petroicida
                    - Petroicidae
                    - - Notiomystidae
                      - Callaeidae
                  - - Eupetida
                      - Picathartidae
                      - - Chaetopidae
                        - Eupetidae
                    - Core Passerides

- Core Passerides
  - Sylviida
    - Paroidea
      - Stenostiridae
      - - Hyliotidae
        - - Remizidae
          - Paridae
    - Sylvioidea
      - - Nicatoridae
        - - Panuridae
          - Alaudidae
      - - Macrosphenidae
        - - - Cisticolidae
            - - - Pnoepygidae
                - Acrocephalidae
              - - Locustellidae
                - - Donacobiidae
                  - Bernieridae
          - - Hirundinidae
            - Pycnonotidae
            - - - Phylloscopidae
                - - Cettiidae
                  - - Hyliidae
                    - Aegithalidae
              - - - Sylviidae
                  - Paradoxornithidae
                - - Zosteropidae
                  - - Timaliidae
                    - - Pellorneidae
                      - Leiothrichidae
  - - Muscicapida
      - Reguloidea
        Regulidae
      - Bombycilloidea
        - Elachuridae
        - Mohoidae
        - - Ptiliogonatidae
          - - Bombycillidae
            - - Dulidae
              - Hypocoliidae
      - Certhioidea
        - - Tichodromadidae
          - Sittidae
        - - Certhiidae
          - - Troglodytidae
            - Polioptilidae
      - Muscicapoidea
        - - Cinclidae
          - - Turdidae
            - Muscicapidae
        - - Buphagidae
          - - Mimidae
            - Sturnidae
    - Passerida
      - Promeropidae
      - - Arcanatoridae
        - - - Dicaeidae
            - Nectariniidae
          - - Urocynchramidae
            - - - Irenidae
                - Chloropseidae
              - - - Peucedramidae
                  - Prunellidae
                - - Estrildid clade
                    - Ploceidae
                    - - Viduidae
                      - Estrildidae
                  - Passerid clade
                    - Passeridae
                    - - Motacillidae
                      - - Fringillidae
                        - - Calcariidae
                          - - Rhodinocichlidae
                            - - - Emberizidae
                                - Passerellidae
                                - - ?Zeledonia
                                  - ?Teretistris
                                  - Phaenicophilidae
                                  - - Icteridae
                                    - Parulidae
                              - - Mitrospingidae
                                - Cardinalidae
                                - Thraupidae

Source for cladogram:
