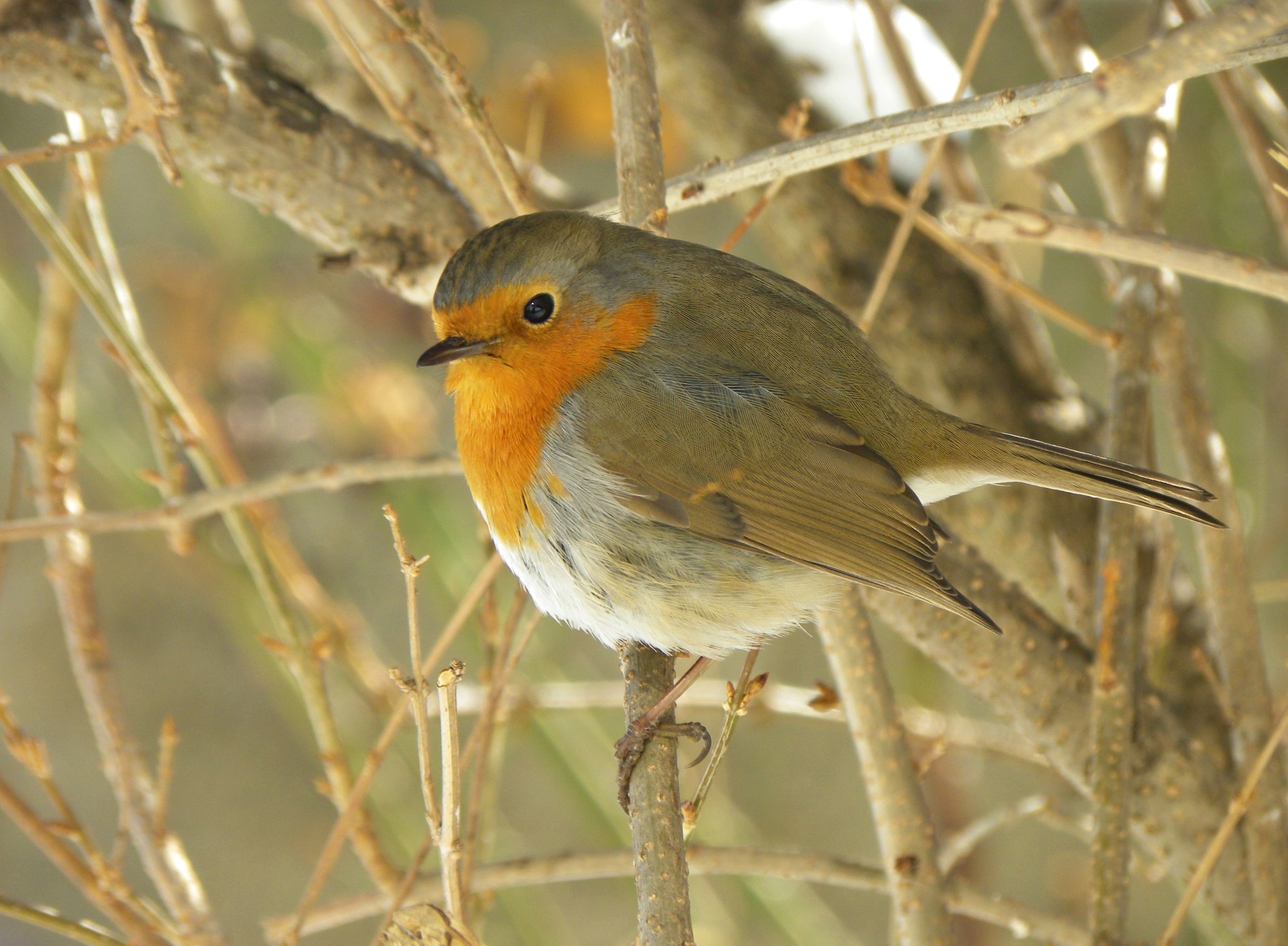
- European robin (Erithacus rubecula)

Scientific classification
- Kingdom: Animalia
- Phylum: Chordata
- Class: Aves
- Order: Passeriformes
- Suborder: Passeri
- Infraorder: Passerides
- Parvorder: Muscicapida

= Muscicapida =

Clade of birds

Muscicapida is a clade of birds in the order Passeriformes. Oliveros, C.H. et al. (2019) suggested a gondwanan migration of this lineage from Australia to Eurasia.

== Systematics ==
The parvorder contains the following 19 families:

- Bombycilloidea
  - Dulidae: palmchat
  - Bombycillidae: waxwings
  - Ptiliogonatidae: silky flycatchers
  - Hylocitreidae: hylocitrea
  - Hypocoliidae: hypocolius
  - † Mohoidae: oos
- Muscicapoidea
  - Elachuridae: spotted elachura
  - Cinclidae: dippers
  - Muscicapidae: Old World flycatchers and chats
  - Turdidae: thrushes and allies
  - Buphagidae: oxpeckers
  - Sturnidae: starlings and rhabdornis
  - Mimidae: mockingbirds and thrashers
- Regulidae: goldcrests and kinglets
- Certhioidea
  - Tichodromidae: wallcreeper
  - Sittidae: nuthatches
  - Certhiidae: treecreepers
  - Polioptilidae: gnatcatchers
  - Troglodytidae: wrens

The cladogram of Muscicapida shown below is based on the analysis of Carl Oliveros and colleagues published in 2019:

- Muscicapida
  - Bombycilloidea
  - - Muscicapoidea
    - - Regulidae
      - Certhioidea
