= Handbook of the Birds of the World =

Multi-volume series covering all bird species

- Author: Josep del Hoyo (ed.); Andrew Elliott (ed.); Jordi Sargatal (ed.; vol. 1–7); David A Christie (ed.; vol. 8–16)
- Country: Spain
- Language: English
- Genre: Nature
- Publisher: Lynx Edicions
- Published: 1992–2013
- Media type: Print

The Handbook of the Birds of the World (HBW) is a multi-volume series produced by the Spanish publishing house Lynx Edicions in partnership with BirdLife International. It is the first handbook to cover every known living species of bird. The series was edited by Josep del Hoyo, Andrew Elliott, Jordi Sargatal and David A. Christie.

All 16 volumes have been published. For the first time an animal class will have all the species illustrated and treated in detail in a single work. This has not been done before for any other group in the animal kingdom.

Material in each volume is grouped first by family, with an introductory article on each family; this is followed by individual species accounts (taxonomy, subspecies and distribution, descriptive notes, habitat, food and feeding, breeding, movements, status and conservation, bibliography). In addition, all volumes except the first and second contain an essay on a particular ornithological theme. More than 200 renowned specialists and 35 illustrators (including Toni Llobet, Hilary Burn, Chris Rose and H. Douglas Pratt) from more than 40 countries have contributed to the project up to now, as well as 834 photographers from all over the world.

Since the first volume appeared in 1992, the series has received various international awards. The first volume was selected as Bird Book of the Year by the magazines Birdwatch and British Birds, and the fifth volume was recognised as Outstanding Academic Title by Choice Magazine, the American Library Association magazine. The seventh volume, as well as being named Bird Book of the Year by Birdwatch and British Birds, also received the distinction of Best Bird Reference Book in the 2002 WorldTwitch Book Awards This same distinction was also awarded to Volume 8 a year later in 2003.

Individual volumes are large, measuring 32 by 25 centimetres (12.6 by 9.8 in), and weighing between 4 and 4.6 kilograms (8.8 and 10.1 lb); it has been commented in a review that "fork-lift truck book" would be a more appropriate title.

As a complement to the Handbook of the Birds of the World and with the ultimate goal of disseminating knowledge about the world's avifauna, in 2002 Lynx Edicions started the Internet Bird Collection (IBC). It is a free-access, but not free-licensed, on-line audiovisual library of the world's birds with the aim of posting videos, photos and sound recordings showing a variety of biological aspects (e.g. subspecies, plumages, feeding, breeding, etc.) for every species. It is a non-profit endeavour fuelled by material from more than one hundred contributors from around the world.

In early 2013, Lynx Edicions launched the online database HBW Alive, which includes the volume and family introductions and updated species accounts from all 17 published HBW volumes. Since its launch, the taxonomy has been thoroughly revised and updated twice (once for non-passerines and once for passerines), following the publication of the two volumes of the HBW and BirdLife International Illustrated Checklist of the Birds of the World.

The Handbook of the Birds of the World Alive site also provides a free access "Key to Scientific Names in Ornithology".

An updated two-volume set with taxonomic revisions was released in 2014 as the Illustrated Checklist of the Birds of the World, and a condensed, single-volume version of the series was published in 2019 as All the Birds of the World.

== Published volumes ==
A list of volumes of the Handbook of the Birds of the World produced to date is as follows:

=== Volume 1: Ostrich to Ducks ===
This volume was published in 1992. Unlike subsequent volumes, it does not have an introductory essay; instead, it has a 38-page overview by Eduardo de Juana of the biology of birds and a foreword welcoming the HBW project, by Christoph Imboden. Groups covered in this volume are as follows:

- Struthionidae (ostrich)
- Rheidae (rheas)
- Casuariidae (cassowaries)
- Dromaiidae (emu)
- Apterygidae (kiwis)
- Tinamidae (tinamous)
- Spheniscidae (penguins)
- Gaviidae (loons)
- Podicipedidae (grebes)
- Diomedeidae (albatrosses)
- Procellariidae (petrels and shearwaters)
- Hydrobatidae (storm-petrels)
- Pelecanoididae (diving-petrels)
- Phaethontidae (tropicbirds)
- Pelecanidae (pelicans)
- Sulidae (gannets and boobies)
- Phalacrocoracidae (cormorants)
- Anhingidae (darters)
- Fregatidae (frigatebirds)
- Ardeidae (herons)
- Scopidae (hamerkop)
- Ciconiidae (storks)
- Balaenicipitidae (shoebill)
- Threskiornithidae (ibises and spoonbills)
- Phoenicopteridae (flamingos)
- Anhimidae (screamers)
- Anatidae (ducks, geese and swans)

=== Volume 2: New World Vultures to Guineafowl ===
This volume was published in 1994. It has a foreword by Walter J. Bock on the organization of information in HBW. Groups covered in this volume are as follows:

- Cathartidae (New World vultures)
- Pandionidae (osprey)
- Accipitridae (hawks and eagles)
- Sagittariidae (secretarybird)
- Falconidae (falcons and caracaras)
- Megapodiidae (megapodes)
- Cracidae (chachalacas, guans and curassows)
- Meleagrididae (turkeys)
- Tetraonidae (grouse)
- Odontophoridae (New World quails)
- Phasianidae (pheasants and partridges)
- Numididae (guineafowl)

=== Volume 3: Hoatzin to Auks ===
This volume was published in 1996. It has a foreword by Robert Bateman on "art and nature". Groups covered in this volume are as follows:

- Opisthocomidae (hoatzin)
- Mesitornithidae (mesites)
- Turnicidae (buttonquails)
- Gruidae (cranes)
- Aramidae (limpkin)
- Psophiidae (trumpeters)
- Rallidae (rails, gallinules and coots)
- Heliornithidae (finfoots)
- Rhynochetidae (kagu)
- Eurypygidae (sunbittern)
- Cariamidae (seriemas)
- Otididae (bustards)
- Jacanidae (jacanas)
- Rostratulidae (painted snipes)
- Dromadidae (crab plover)
- Haematopodidae (oystercatchers)
- Ibidorhynchidae (ibisbill)
- Recurvirostridae (avocets, stilts)
- Burhinidae (thick-knees)
- Glareolidae (pratincoles, coursers)
- Charadriidae (plovers)
- Scolopacidae (sandpipers and allies)
- Pedionomidae (plains-wanderer)
- Thinocoridae (seedsnipes)
- Chionididae (sheathbills)
- Stercorariidae (skuas)
- Laridae (gulls)
- Sternidae (terns)
- Rynchopidae (skimmers)
- Alcidae (auks)

=== Volume 4: Sandgrouse to Cuckoos ===
This volume was published in 1997. It has an introductory essay "Species Concepts and Species Limits in Ornithology" by Jürgen Haffer. Groups covered in this volume are as follows:

- Pteroclidae (sandgrouse)
- Columbidae (pigeons and doves)
- Cacatuidae (cockatoos)
- Psittacidae (parrots)
- Musophagidae (turacos)
- Cuculidae (cuckoos)

=== Volume 5: Barn-Owls to Hummingbirds ===
This volume was published in 1999. It has an introductory essay "Risk Indicators and Status Assessment in Birds" by Nigel J. Collar. Groups covered in this volume are as follows:

- Tytonidae (barn-owls)
- Strigidae (typical owls)
- Steatornithidae (oilbird)
- Aegothelidae (owlet-nightjars)
- Podargidae (frogmouths)
- Nyctibiidae (potoos)
- Caprimulgidae (nightjars)
- Apodidae (swifts)
- Hemiprocnidae (tree-swifts)
- Trochilidae (hummingbirds)

=== Volume 6: Mousebirds to Hornbills ===
This volume was published in 2001. It has an introductory essay "Avian Bioacoustics" by Luis Baptista and Don Kroodsma. Groups covered in this volume are as follows:

- Coliidae (mousebirds)
- Trogonidae (trogons)
- Alcedinidae (kingfishers)
- Todidae (todies)
- Momotidae (motmots)
- Meropidae (bee-eaters)
- Coraciidae (rollers)
- Brachypteraciidae (ground-rollers)
- Leptosomidae (cuckoo-rollers)
- Upupidae (hoopoes)
- Phoeniculidae (wood-hoopoes)
- Bucerotidae (hornbills)

=== Volume 7: Jacamars to Woodpeckers ===
This volume was published in 2002. It has an introductory essay "Extinct Birds" by Errol Fuller. Groups covered in this volume are as follows:

- Galbulidae (jacamars)
- Bucconidae (puffbirds)
- Capitonidae (barbets)
- Ramphastidae (toucans)
- Indicatoridae (honeyguides)
- Picidae (woodpeckers)

=== Volume 8: Broadbills to Tapaculos ===
This volume was published in 2003. It has an introductory essay "A Brief History of Classifying Birds" by Murray Bruce. Groups covered in this volume are as follows:

- Eurylaimidae (broadbills)
- Philepittidae (asities)
- Pittidae (pittas)
- Furnariidae (ovenbirds)
- Dendrocolaptidae (woodcreepers)
- Thamnophilidae (typical antbirds)
- Formicariidae (ground-antbirds)
- Conopophagidae (gnateaters)
- Rhinocryptidae (tapaculos)

=== Volume 9: Cotingas to Pipits and Wagtails ===
This volume was published in 2004. It has an introductory essay "Ornithological Nomenclature" by Richard Banks. Groups covered in this volume are as follows:

- Cotingidae (cotingas)
- Pipridae (manakins)
- Tyrannidae (tyrant-flycatchers)
- Acanthisittidae (New Zealand wrens)
- Atrichornithidae (scrub-birds)
- Menuridae (lyrebirds)
- Alaudidae (larks)
- Hirundinidae (swallows and martins)
- Motacillidae (pipits and wagtails)

=== Volume 10: Cuckoo-shrikes to Thrushes ===
This volume was published in 2005. It has an introductory essay "The Ecology and Impact of Non-Indigenous Birds" by Daniel Sol, Tim Blackburn, Phillip Cassey, Richard Duncan and Jordi Clavell. Groups covered in this volume are as follows:

- Campephagidae (cuckoo-shrikes)
- Pycnonotidae (bulbuls)
- Chloropseidae (leafbirds)
- Irenidae (fairy-bluebirds)
- Aegithinidae (ioras)
- Ptilogonatidae (silky-flycatchers)
- Bombycillidae (waxwings)
- Hypocoliidae (hypocolius)
- Dulidae (palmchat)
- Cinclidae (dippers)
- Troglodytidae (wrens)
- Mimidae (mockingbirds and thrashers)
- Prunellidae (accentors)
- Turdidae (thrushes) (including chats, which are now part of the family Muscicapidae (HBW 11))

=== Volume 11: Old World Flycatchers to Old World Warblers ===
This volume was published in September 2006. It has an introductory essay "Ecological Significance of Bird Populations" by Cagan Sekercioglu with a preface by Paul R. Ehrlich. Groups covered in this volume are as follows:

- Muscicapidae (Old World flycatchers)
- Platysteiridae (batises and wattle-eyes)
- Rhipiduridae (fantails)
- Monarchidae (monarch-flycatchers)
- Regulidae (kinglets and firecrests)
- Polioptilidae (gnatcatchers)
- Cisticolidae (cisticolas and allies)
- Sylviidae (Old World warblers)

=== Volume 12: Picathartes to Tits and Chickadees ===
This volume was published in October 2007. It includes an introduction to the fossil birds by Kevin J. Kayleigh. This volume covers the following groups:

- Picathartidae (picathartes)
- Timaliidae (babblers)
- Paradoxornithidae (parrotbills)
- Pomatostomidae (Australasian babblers)
- Orthonychidae (logrunners)
- Eupetidae (jewel-babblers and allies)
- Pachycephalidae (whistlers)
- Petroicidae (Australasian robins)
- Maluridae (fairy-wrens)
- Dasyornithidae (bristlebirds)
- Acanthizidae (Australasian warblers and thornbills)
- Epthianuridae (Australian chats)
- Neosittidae (sittellas)
- Climacteridae (Australasian treecreepers)
- Paridae (chickadees)

=== Volume 13: Penduline-tits to Shrikes ===
This volume was published in October 2008. It includes an introductory essay on bird migration by Ian Newton. Groups covered in this volume are as follows:

- Remizidae (penduline-tits)
- Aegithalidae (long-tailed tits)
- Sittidae (nuthatches)
- Tichodromadidae (wallcreeper)
- Certhiidae (treecreepers)
- Rhabdornithidae (Rabdornis)
- Nectariniidae (sunbirds)
- Melanocharitidae (berrypeckers and longbills)
- Paramythiidae (painted berrypeckers)
- Dicaeidae (flowerpeckers)
- Pardalotidae (pardalotes)
- Zosteropidae (white-eyes)
- Promeropidae (sugarbirds)
- Meliphagidae (honeyeaters)
- Oriolidae (orioles)
- Laniidae (shrikes)

=== Volume 14: Bush-shrikes to Old World Sparrows ===
This volume was published in October 2009. It includes the foreword "Birding Past, Present and Future – a Global View" by Stephen Moss. Groups covered in this volume are as follows:

- Malaconotidae (bush-shrikes)
- Prionopidae (helmet-shrikes)
- Vangidae (vangas)
- Dicruridae (drongos)
- Callaeidae (New Zealand wattlebirds)
- Notiomystidae (stitchbird)
- Grallinidae (magpie-larks)
- Corcoracidae (white-winged chough and apostlebird)
- Artamidae (woodswallows)
- Pityriaseidae (Bornean bristlehead)
- Cracticidae (butcherbirds)
- Paradisaeidae (birds-of-paradise)
- Ptilonorhynchidae (bowerbirds)
- Corvidae (crows)
- Buphagidae (oxpeckers)
- Sturnidae (starlings)
- Passeridae (Old World sparrows)

=== Volume 15: Weavers to New World Warblers ===
This volume was published in October 2010. It includes a foreword on bird conservation by Stuart Butchart, Nigel Collar, Alison Stattersfield, and Leon Bennun. Groups covered in this volume are as follows:

- Ploceidae (weavers)
- Estrildidae (waxbills)
- Viduidae (indigobirds)
- Vireonidae (vireos)
- Fringillidae (finches)
- Drepanididae (i.e. subfamily Drepanidinae in recent taxonomies) (Hawaiian honeycreepers)
- Peucedramidae (Olive warbler)
- Parulidae (New World warblers)

=== Volume 16: Cardinals to New World Blackbirds ===
This volume was published in December 2011. It includes a foreword on climate change and birds by Anders Pape Møller. Groups covered in this volume are as follows:

- Thraupidae (tanagers)
- Cardinalidae (cardinals)
- Emberizidae (buntings and New World sparrows)
- Icteridae (New World blackbirds)

=== Special Volume: New Species and Global Index ===
This volume was published in July 2013. It includes a comprehensive introduction by Jon Fjeldså on changes in bird macrosystematics and a foreword on the history of BirdLife International. It covers 84 new species published more recently than their corresponding HBW volumes, including 15 scientific descriptions of newly discovered Amazonian birds.

=== HBW and BirdLife International Illustrated Checklist of the Birds of the World, Volume 1: Non-passerines ===
This volume was published in July 2014. It depicts all non-passerines with drawings and maps, including all extinct species since the year 1500.

=== HBW and BirdLife International Illustrated Checklist of the Birds of the World, Volume 2: Passerines ===
This volume was published in December 2016. It depicts all passerines with drawings and maps, including all extinct species since the year 1500.

== See also ==
- Handbook of the Mammals of the World, a similar project covering mammals
