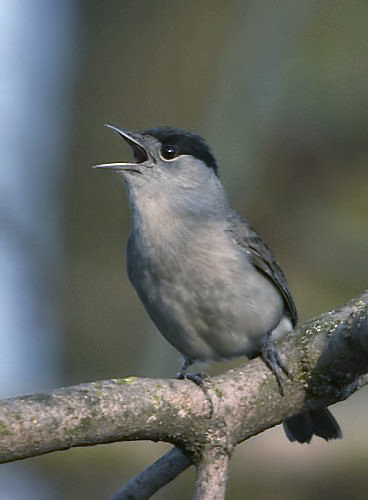
- Blackcap (Sylvia atricapilla)

Scientific classification
- Kingdom: Animalia
- Phylum: Chordata
- Class: Aves
- Order: Passeriformes
- Suborder: Passeri
- Infraorder: Passerides
- Parvorder: Sylviida

Families
- See text

Synonyms
- Zosteropoidea

= Sylviida =

Parvorder of birds

Sylviida is a parvorder of passerine birds, one of at least three major clades within the Passerides along with the Muscicapida and Passerida. It contains about 1300 species including the Old World warblers, Old World babblers, swallows, larks and bulbuls. Members of the clade are found worldwide, but fewer species are present in the Americas.

== Systematics ==
The superfamily Sylvioidea was first proposed in 1990 in the Sibley–Ahlquist taxonomy of birds based on DNA–DNA hybridization experiments. More recent studies based on comparison of DNA sequences have failed to support the inclusion of some families such as Certhiidae (treecreepers), Sittidae (nuthatches), Paridae (tits and chickadees) and Regulidae (goldcrests and kinglets) but instead support the addition of Alaudidae (larks).

Some of the families within the Sylvioidea have been greatly redefined. In particular, the Old World warbler family Sylviidae and Old World babbler family Timaliidae were used as wastebin taxa and included many species which have turned out not to be closely related. Several new families have been created and some species have been moved from one family to another.

=== List of families ===
This list of 27 families is based on the molecular phylogenetic study published by Silke Fregin and colleagues in 2012 and the revisions of the babbler group by Cai et al. (2019) and Oliveros et al.. The family sequence and number of species is from AviList v2025

- Stenostiridae: fairy flycatchers (9 species)
- Hyliotidae: hyliotas (4 species)
- Remizidae: penduline tits (11 species)
- Paridae: tits, chickadees, and titmice (62 species)
- Panuridae: reedling (1 species)
- Alaudidae: larks (98 species)
- Nicatoridae: nicators (3 species)
- Macrosphenidae: longbills, crombecs, and allies (18 species)
- Cisticolidae: cisticolas and allies (164 species)
- superfamily Locustelloidea
  - Acrocephalidae: reed warblers and allies (60 species)
  - Donacobiidae: donacobius (1 species)
  - Bernieridae: Madagascan warblers and tetrakas (11 species)
  - Locustellidae: grasshopper warblers, grassbirds, and allies (67 species)
- Pnoepygidae: cupwings (4 species)
- Hirundinidae: swallows (92 species)
- superfamily Aegithaloidea
  - Hyliidae: hylias (2 species)
  - Aegithalidae: tit-warblers, bushtits, and long-tailed tit (11 species)
  - Erythrocercidae: yellow flycatchers (3 species)
  - Cettiidae: bush warblers and allies (31 species)
  - Phylloscopidae: leaf warblers (80 species)
- superfamily Sylvioidea
  - Pycnonotidae: bulbuls (161 species)
  - Sylviidae: sylviid warblers and allies (32 species)
  - Paradoxornithidae: parrotbills and allies (38 species)
  - Zosteropidae: white-eyes, yuhias, and allies (147 species)
  - Timaliidae: tree babblers, scimitar babblers, and allies (57 species)
  - Pellorneidae: ground babblers and allies (65 species)
  - Leiothrichidae: laughingthrushes and allies (143 species)
