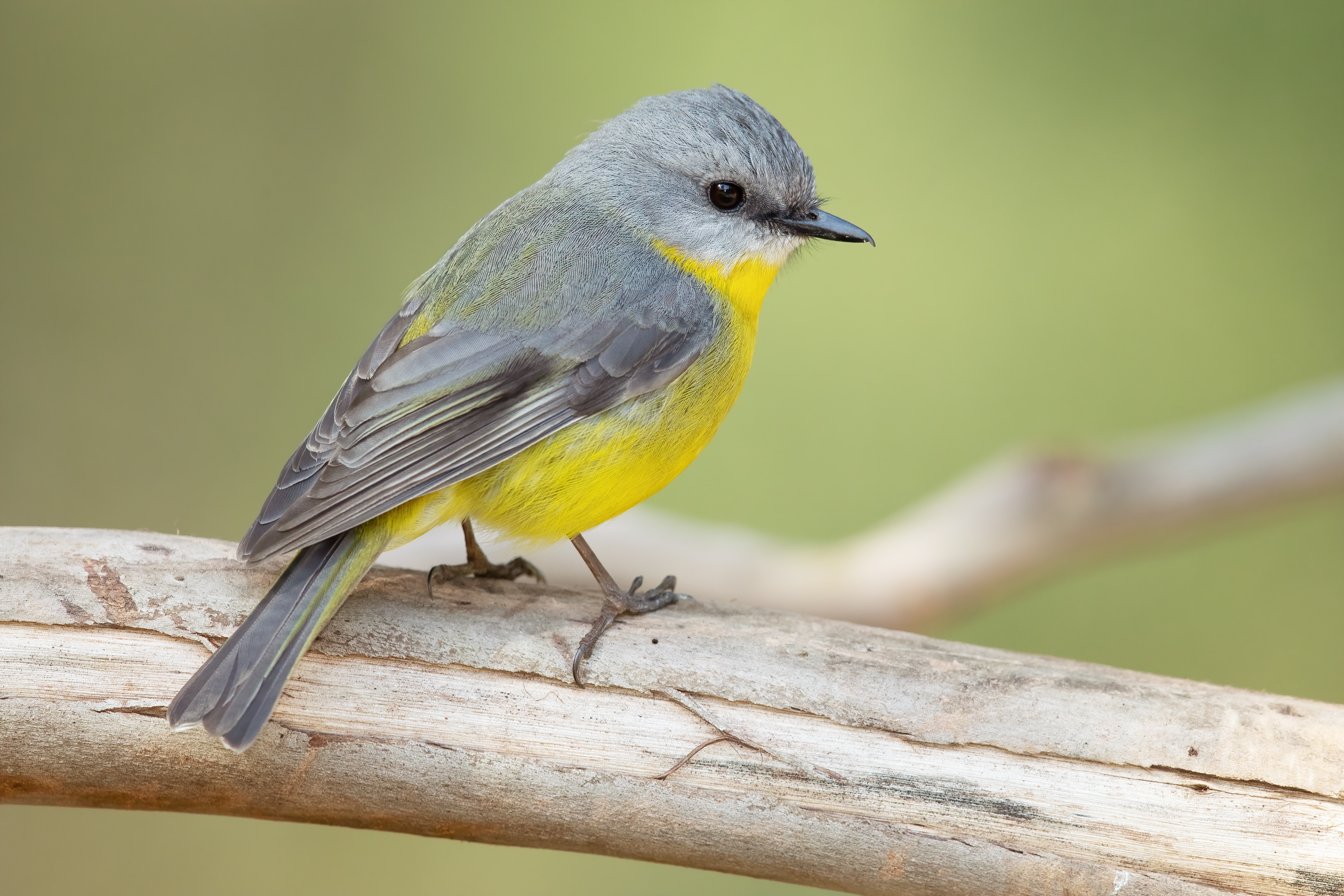
- Eastern yellow robin (Eopsaltria australis)

Scientific classification
- Kingdom: Animalia
- Phylum: Chordata
- Class: Aves
- Order: Passeriformes
- Clade: Eupasseres
- Suborder: Passeri; Linnaeus, 1758

Infraorders
- Menurides; Climacterides; Meliphagides; Orthonychides; Corvides; Passerides

Synonyms
- See text

Audio
- Song of a chipping sparrow (Spizella passerina)

= Songbird =

Songbird Temporal range: Early Eocene to present 48–0 Ma

Suborder of birds

A songbird is a bird belonging to the suborder Passeri of the perching birds. Another name that is sometimes seen as the scientific or vernacular name is Oscines, from Latin oscen, 'songbird'.

Songbirds form one of the two major lineages of extant perching birds (~4,000 species), the other being the Tyranni (~1,000 species), which are most diverse in the Neotropics and absent from many parts of the world. The Tyranni have a simpler syrinx musculature, and while their vocalizations are often just as complex and striking as those of songbirds, they are altogether more mechanical sounding. There is a third perching bird lineage, the Acanthisitti of New Zealand, of which only two species remain alive today. Recent estimates indicate that songbirds originated 50 million years ago. The distribution of their basal lineages suggests that their origin and initial diversification occurred exclusively in the Australian continent; and only about 40 million years ago, oscines started to colonize Eurasia, Africa, and eventually the Americas.

== Description ==
Many songbirds provide caterpillars to their young. Here a spotted towhee finds a anise swallowtail caterpillar.

The song in this clade is essentially territorial, because it communicates the identity and whereabouts of an individual to other birds, and also signals sexual intentions. Sexual selection among songbirds is highly based on mimetic vocalization. Female preference has shown in some populations to be based on the extent of a male's song repertoire. The larger a male's repertoire, the more females a male individual attracts. It is not to be confused with bird calls that are used for alarms and contact and are especially important in birds that feed or migrate in flocks. While almost all living birds give calls of some sort, well-developed songs are only given by a few lineages outside the songbirds. And still, not all songbirds proffer a call that is distinctly melodious. Songbirds do, however, possess a highly developed vocal organ, the syrinx, that enables their sonorous activity. This organ, also known as a song box, can be found where the windpipe meets diverging bronchial tubes which lead to the lungs. The organ is a solid, bony structure lined with a film of membranes which air passes through as the songbird calls. While the song boxes of songbirds vary in size and intricacy, this does not necessarily determine the songbird's ability to voice their song. Researchers believe this has more to do with the length of the windpipe.

The American robin, like most thrushes, has a complex near continuous song, consisting of discrete units often repeated and spliced by a string of pauses.

Other birds (especially non-passeriforms) sometimes have songs to attract mates or hold territory, but these are usually simple and repetitive, lacking the variety of many oscine songs. The monotonous repetition of the common cuckoo or little crake can be contrasted with the variety of a nightingale or marsh warbler. However, although many songbirds have songs that are pleasant to the human ear, this is not invariably the case. Many members of the crow family (Corvidae) communicate with croaks or screeches, which sound harsh to humans. Even these, however, have a song of sorts, a softer twitter that is given between courting partners. And even though some parrots (which are not songbirds) can be taught to repeat human speech, vocal mimicry among birds is almost completely restricted to songbirds, some of which (such as the lyrebirds or the aptly named mockingbirds) excel in imitating the sounds of other birds or even environmental noises.

The birds from higher altitudes have evolved thicker downs (also known as jackets) to protect themselves from colder temperatures. Their feathers have outer and inner portions, with the lower down being fluffier and warmer to provide increased warmth.

== Song repertoire and courtship ==
Sexual selection can be broken down into several different studies regarding different aspects of a bird's song. As a result, songs can vary even within a single species. Many believe that song repertoire and cognition are directly related. However, a study published in 2013 has shown that cognitive abilities may not all be directly related to the song repertoire of a songbird. Specifically, spatial learning is said to have an inverse relationship with song repertoire. So for example, this would be an individual who does not migrate as far as others in the species but has a better song repertoire. This suggests an evolutionary trade-off between possible alleles. With natural selection choosing traits best fit for reproductive success, there could be a trade-off in either direction depending on which trait would produce a higher fitness at that time period.

Nightingale song: Because nightingales sing both day and night, it is believed night songs are courtship related and dawn songs are territorial in nature.

Song repertoire can be attributed to male songbirds as it is one of the main mechanisms of courtship. Song repertoires differ from male individual to male individual and species to species. Some species may typically have large repertoires while others may have significantly smaller ones. Mate choice in female songbirds is a significant realm of study as song abilities are continuously evolving. Males often sing to assert their dominance over other males in competition for a female, sometimes in lieu of a combative episode, and to arouse the female by announcing a readiness to mate. Though less frequent, females have also been known to sing occasionally a duet with a mate as an affirmation of their partnership. While some will sing their song from a familiar perch, other species common to grasslands will sing a familiar song each time they fly. Currently, there have been numerous studies involving songbird repertoires, unfortunately, there has not yet been a concrete evidence to confirm that every songbird species prefers larger repertoires. A conclusion can be made that it can vary between species on whether a larger repertoire is connected to better fitness. With this conclusion, it can be inferred that evolution via natural selection, or sexual selection, favors the ability to retain larger repertoires for these certain species as it leads to higher reproductive success. During times of courtship, it is said that male songbirds increase their repertoire by mimicking other species songs. The better the mimicking ability, retaining ability, and the quantity of other species mimicked has been proven to have a positive relationship with mating success. Female preferences cause the constant improvement of accuracy and presentation of the copied songs. Another theory known as the "song-sharing hypothesis" suggests that females prefer simpler, more homogenous songs that signal a male of familiar territory. As birdsong can be broken into regional dialects through this process of mimicry, the foreign song of a newcomer suggests the lack of territorial possession. This can be costly in the wake of territorial conflicts between disparate songbird populations and may compel a female to prefer a male spouting a familiar song of the area.

== Taxonomy and systematics ==
Sibley and Alquist divided songbirds into two "parvorders", Corvida and Passerida (standard taxonomic practice would rank these as infraorders), distributed in Australo-Papua and Eurasia respectively. Subsequent molecular studies, however, show this treatment to be somewhat erroneous. Passerida is a highly diverse lineage, uniting over one-third of all bird species to include (in 2015) 3,885 species). These are divided into three major superfamilies (though not exactly corresponding to the Sibley-Ahlquist arrangement), in addition to some minor lineages.

In contrast, Sibley & Alquist's "Corvida" is a phylogenetic grade and an artefact of the phenetic methodology. The bulk of the "Corvida" make up the large clade Corvides (812 species as of 2015), which is a sister group to the Passerida. The remaining 15 oscine families (343 species in 2015) form a series of basally branching sister groups to the Corvoid - Passerid clade. All of these groups, which form at least six successively branching basal clades, are found exclusively or predominantly in Australasia. Australian endemics are also prominent among basal lineages in both Corvoids and Passerids, suggesting that songbirds originated and diverged in Australia.

Scrubbirds and lyrebirds, of which there are just two species of each, represent the oldest lineage of songbirds on Earth. The rufous scrubbird, Atrichornis rufescens, is essentially confined to the Gondwana Rainforests of Australia World Heritage Area, occurring in both Queensland and New South Wales sections. It is now only found at elevations above 600 m (2,000 ft).

One of the earliest known fossil songbirds is Resoviaornis from the Early Oligocene of Poland.

=== Families ===
- Menuroidea
  - Menuridae: lyrebirds
  - Atrichornithidae: scrub birds
- Bowerbirds and Australian treecreepers
  - Climacteridae: Australian treecreepers
  - Ptilonorhynchidae: bowerbirds
- Meliphagoidea: honeyeaters and allies
  - Maluridae: fairy-wrens, emu-wrens and grasswrens
  - Meliphagidae: true honeyeaters and chats
  - Dasyornithidae: bristlebirds
  - Pardalotidae: pardalotes
  - Acanthizidae: scrubwrens, thornbills, and gerygones
- Australopapuan babblers
  - Pomatostomidae: Australasian babblers
- Logrunners
  - Orthonychidae: logrunners
- Corvides
  - Paramythiidae: tit berrypeckers and crested berrypeckers
  - Psophodidae: whipbirds, jewel-babblers and quail-thrushes
  - Platysteiridae: wattle-eyes and batis
  - Malaconotidae: bush-shrikes
  - Machaerirynchidae: boatbills
  - Vangidae: vangas, woodshrikes, and helmetshrikes
  - Pityriasidae: Bornean bristlehead
  - Artamidae: butcherbirds, currawongs and Australian magpie (formerly in Cracticidae)
  - Rhagologidae: mottled whistlers
  - Aegithinidae: ioras
  - Campephagidae: cuckooshrikes and trillers
  - Mohouidae: whiteheads
  - Neosittidae: sittellas
  - Eulacestomidae: ploughbills
  - Oreoicidae: Australo-Papuan bellbirds
  - Pachycephalidae: whistlers, shrike-thrushes, pitohuis and allies
  - Laniidae: shrikes
  - Vireonidae: vireos
  - Oriolidae: orioles, figbirds and †piopio (formerly Turnagridae)
  - Dicruridae: drongos
  - Rhipiduridae: fantails
  - Monarchidae: monarchs and allies
  - Platylophidae: jayshrikes
  - Corvidae: crows, magpies, and jays
  - Corcoracidae: white-winged chough and apostlebird
  - Melampittidae: melampittas
  - Ifritidae: ifritabirds
  - Paradisaeidae: birds of paradise
- Passerides
  - Cnemophilidae: satinbirds Cnemophilus and Loboparadisea
  - Melanocharitidae: berrypeckers and longbills
  - Callaeidae: New Zealand wattlebirds kōkako, saddleback and †huia
  - Notiomystidae: stitchbird
  - Petroicidae: Australasian robins
  - Picathartidae: rockfowl
  - Chaetopidae: rockjumpers
  - Eupetidae: rail-babbler
  - Bombycillidae: waxwings and allies
  - Ptiliogonatidae: silky-flycatchers
  - Hypocoliidae: hypocolius
  - Dulidae: palmchat
  - † Mohoidae: some Hawaiian honeyeaters, Moho and Chaetoptila genera, not closely related to Meliphagidae
  - Hylocitreidae: hylocitrea
  - Stenostiridae: fairy-flycatcher and allies
  - Paridae: tits, chickadees, and titmouse
  - Remizidae: penduline-tits
  - Nicatoridae: nicators
  - Panuridae: bearded reedling
  - Alaudidae: larks
  - Pycnonotidae: bulbuls
  - Hirundinidae: swallows and martins
  - Pnoepygidae: wren-babblers
  - Macrosphenidae: crombecs and African warblers
  - Cettiidae: bush-warblers and allies
  - Scotocercidae: streaked scrub-warbler
  - Erythrocercidae: yellow flycatchers
  - Aegithalidae: long-tailed tits
  - Phylloscopidae: leaf-warblers and allies. Recently split from Sylviidae.
  - Acrocephalidae: reed warblers and allies
  - Locustellidae: grassbirds and allies
  - Donacobiidae: black-capped donacobius
  - Bernieridae: Malagasy warblers
  - Cisticolidae: cisticolas and allies
  - Timaliidae: babblers
  - Pellorneidae: ground babblers
  - Leiothrichidae: laughingthrushes and allies
  - Sylviidae: Old World warblers
  - Zosteropidae: white-eyes
  - Arcanatoridae: dapple-throat and allies
  - Promeropidae: sugarbirds
  - Irenidae: fairy-bluebirds
  - Regulidae: kinglets
  - Elachuridae: elachuras
  - Hyliotidae: hyliotas
  - Troglodytidae: wrens
  - Polioptilidae: gnatcatchers
  - Sittidae: nuthatches
  - Tichodromidae: wallcreeper
  - Certhiidae: treecreepers
  - Mimidae: mockingbirds and thrashers
  - Sturnidae: starlings
  - Buphagidae: oxpeckers
  - Turdidae: thrushes and allies
  - Muscicapidae: Old World flycatchers and chats
  - Cinclidae: dippers
  - Chloropseidae: leafbirds
  - Dicaeidae: flowerpeckers
  - Nectariniidae: sunbirds
  - Passeridae: true sparrows
  - Ploceidae: weavers and widowbirds
  - Estrildidae: estrildid finches (waxbills, munias, etc.)
  - Viduidae: indigo birds and whydahs
  - Peucedramidae: olive warbler
  - Prunellidae: accentor
  - Motacillidae: wagtails and pipits
  - Urocynchramidae: Przevalski's finch
  - Fringillidae: true finches and Hawaiian honeycreepers (formerly Drepanididae)
  - Parulidae: New World warblers, for example the black-throated blue warblers and allies
  - Icteridae: American blackbirds, New World orioles, grackles and cowbirds.
  - Coerebidae: bananaquit
  - Emberizidae: buntings
  - Passerellidae: New World sparrows
  - Thraupidae: tanagers, true honeycreepers and allies
  - Calcariidae: snow buntings and longspurs
  - Cardinalidae: cardinals and allies

== See also ==
- Song system
