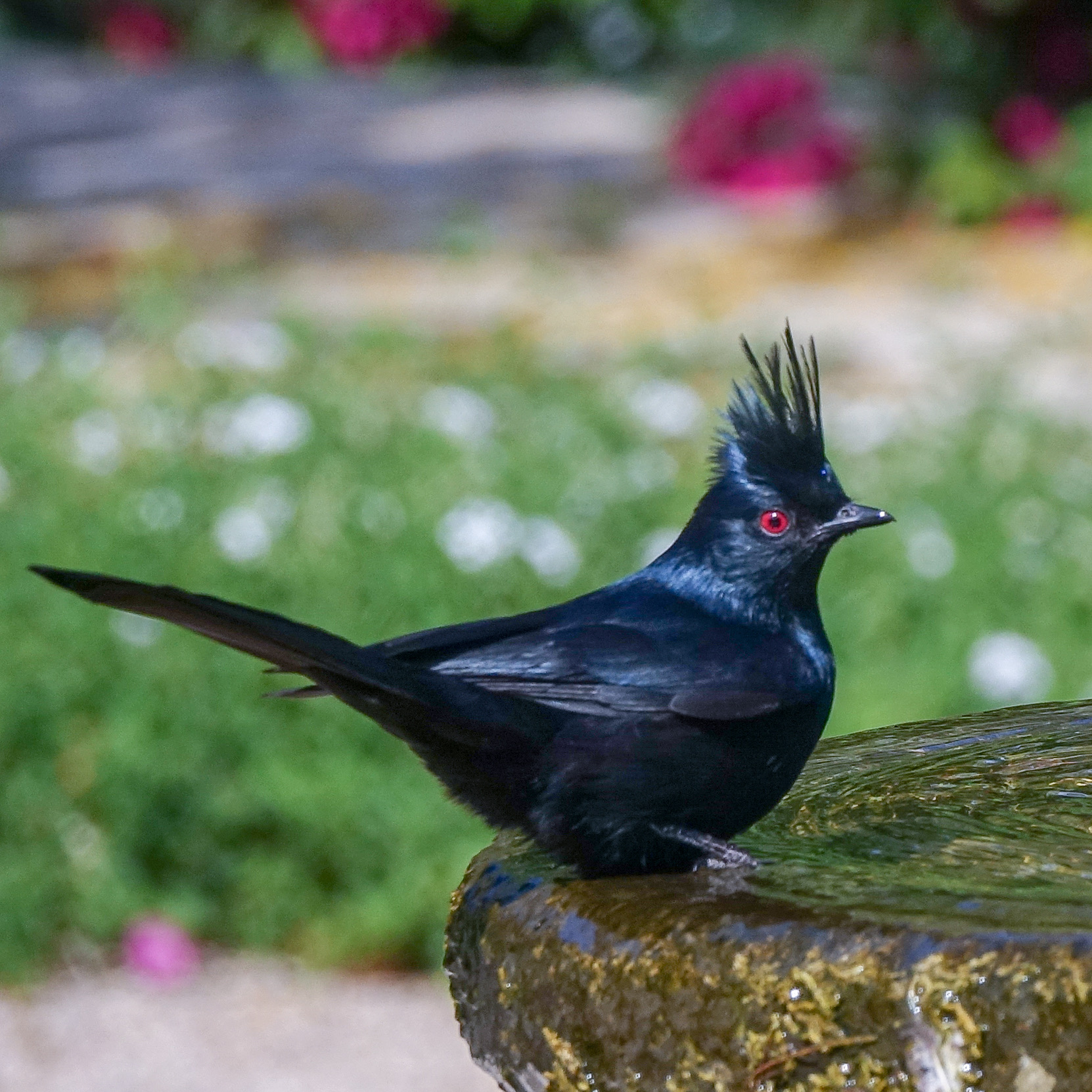
- Phainopepla (Phainopepla nitens)

Scientific classification
- Kingdom: Animalia
- Phylum: Chordata
- Class: Aves
- Order: Passeriformes
- Parvorder: Muscicapida
- Superfamily: Bombycilloidea; Alström et al., 2014

Families
- Dulidae; Bombycillidae; Ptiliogonatidae; Hylocitreidae; Hypocoliidae; †Mohoidae

= Bombycilloidea =

Superfamily of birds

Bombycilloidea is a superfamily of passerine birds that contains ten living species. They are found in North, Central America, most of the Palearctic, the Arabian Peninsula, the islands of Hispaniola and Sulawesi, and formerly the Hawaiian Islands.

== Taxonomy ==
The superfamily includes only ten extant species. It is sister to a clade containing Muscicapoidea, Certhoidea and Regulidae (both clades are contained within the parvorder Muscicapida), from which it diverged during the mid-late Oligocene, about 25 million years ago. The common ancestor for both clades lived in Eurasia; at some point, the ancestral Bombycilloidea arrived in North America where they rapidly radiated into multiple families. One of these lineages moved back into Eurasia, where it gave rise to several lineages that stayed in Eurasia or colonized Wallacea or Hawaii.

Two families, the waxwings (Bombycillidae) and silky-flycatchers (Ptiliogonatidae) contain several species and are widespread throughout the Holarctic and North America respectively, but the others are monotypic (the hypocolius in Hypocoliidae), are restricted to a few islands (the extinct Hawaiian honeyeaters in Mohoidae), or both (the palmchat in Dulidae and the hylocitrea in Hylocitreidae).

The most basal extant family in Bombycilloidea is Dulidae, and the most derived are the Hypocoliidae and Mohoidae. Mohoidae is also notable for being the only known avian family to have gone extinct in recent times, with the last species, the Kauaʻi ʻōʻō (Moho braccatus) going extinct in 1987.

The cladogram of the bombycilloids shown below is based on the analysis of Carl Oliveros and colleagues published in 2019.

- Bombycilloidea
  - Dulidae – palmchat
  - - Bombycillidae – waxwings
    - - Ptiliogonatidae – silky-flycatchers
      - - Hylocitreidae – hylocitrea
        - - Hypocoliidae – hypocolius
          - †Mohoidae – Hawaiian honeyeaters
