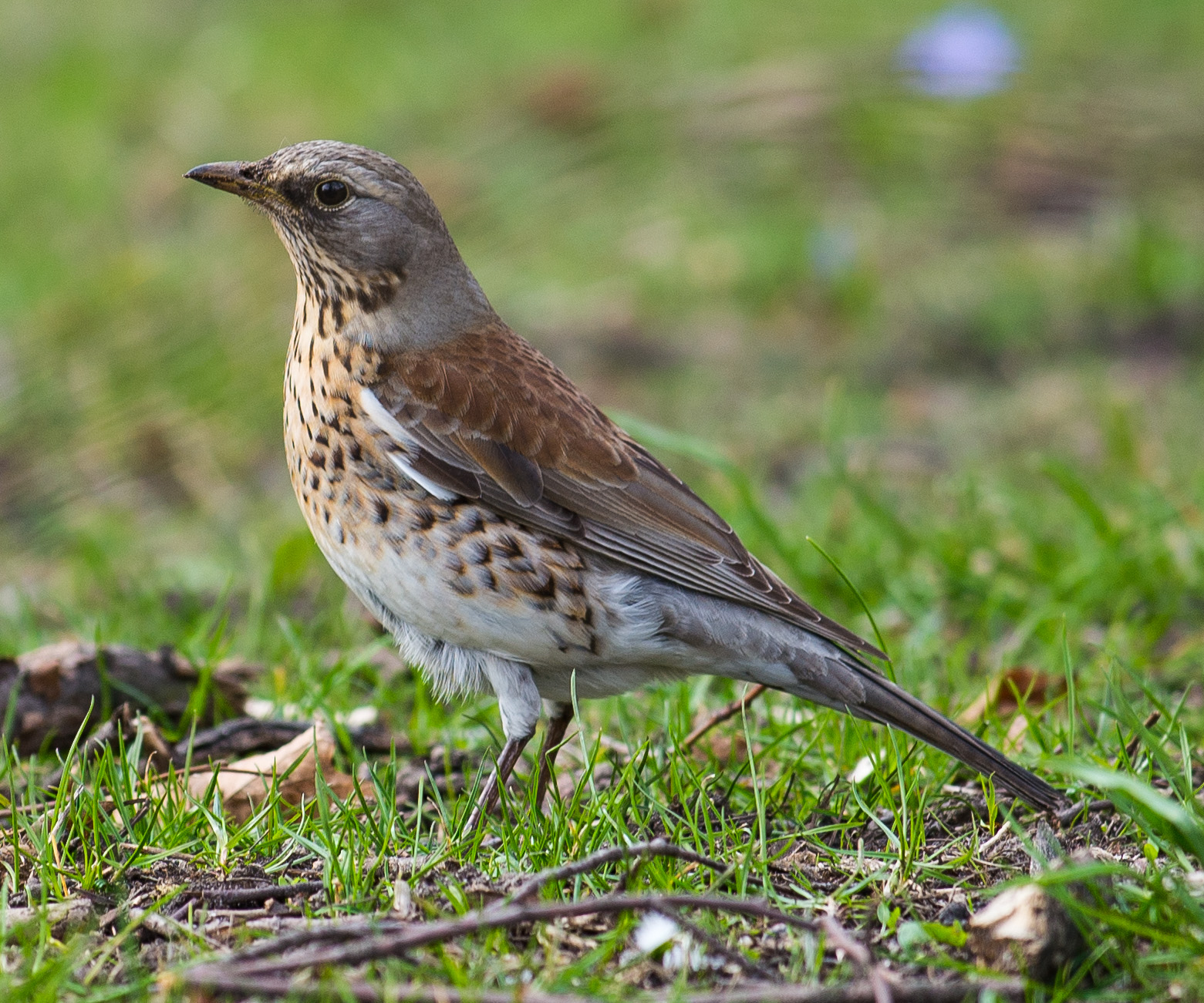
- Fieldfare (Turdus pilaris)

Scientific classification
- Domain: Eukaryota
- Kingdom: Animalia
- Phylum: Chordata
- Class: Aves
- Order: Passeriformes
- Infraorder: Passerida
- Superfamily: Muscicapoidea

Families
- Elachuridae; Cinclidae; Muscicapidae; Turdidae; Buphagidae; Sturnidae; Mimidae

= Muscicapoidea =

Superfamily of birds

Muscicapoidea is a superfamily belonging to the infraorder Passerides containing the Old World flycatchers, thrushes, starlings and their allies. The superfamily contains around 670 species.

Within the parvorder Muscicapida, Muscicapoidea is sister to a clade containing the superfamily Certhioidea and the family Regulidae.

== Classification ==
In 2019 Carl Oliveros and colleagues published a large molecular phylogenetic study of the passerines that included species from each of the seven families that make up the superfamily Muscicapoidea.

- Muscicapoidea
  - - Elachuridae – spotted elachura
    - - Cinclidae – dippers (5 species)
      - - - Muscicapidae – chats, Old World flycatchers (332 species)
          - Turdidae – thrushes (172 species)
        - - Buphagidae – oxpeckers (2 species)
          - - Sturnidae – starlings, rhabdornis (123 species)
            - Mimidae – mockingbirds, thrashers (34 species)
