= Sylvioidea =

Scientific classification
- Kingdom: Animalia
- Phylum: Chordata
- Class: Aves
- Order: Passeriformes
- Suborder: Passeri
- Infraorder: Passerides
- Parvorder: Sylviida
- Superfamily: Sylvioidea

Families
- See text

Superfamily of birds

Sylvioidea is a superfamily of birds in the order Passeriformes.

== Systematics ==
Sylvioidea contains the following families:

- Pycnonotidae
- Sylviidae
- Paradoxornithidae
- Zosteropidae
- Timaliidae
- Pellorneidae
- Leiothrichidae
