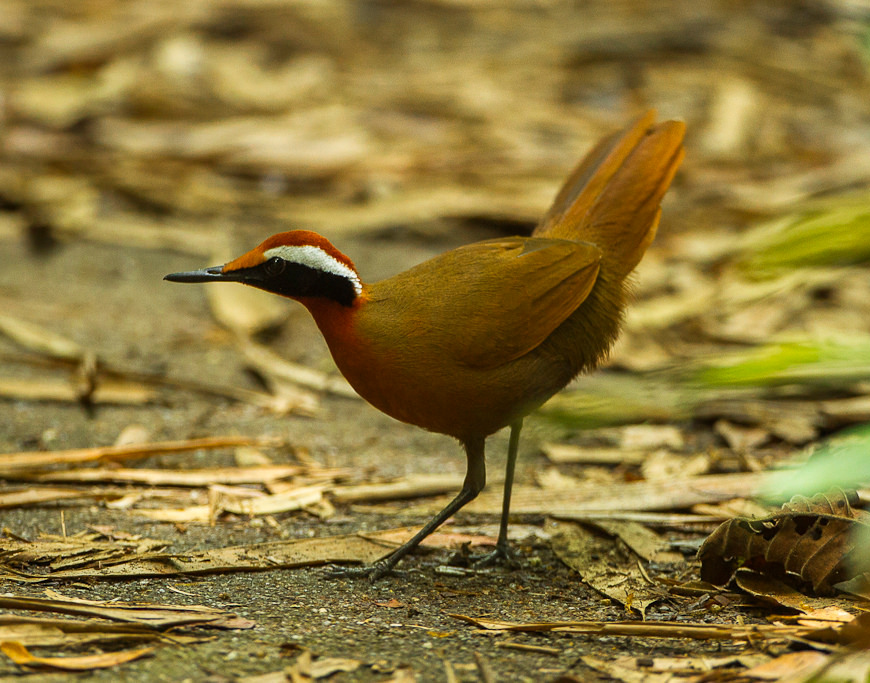

Conservation status
- Near Threatened (IUCN 3.1)

Scientific classification
- Kingdom: Animalia
- Phylum: Chordata
- Class: Aves
- Order: Passeriformes
- Infraorder: Passerides
- Family: Eupetidae; Bonaparte, 1850
- Genus: Eupetes; Temminck, 1831
- Species: E. macrocerus

Binomial name
- Eupetes macrocerus Temminck, 1831

Synonyms
- Eupetes macrocercus

= Rail-babbler =

Genus of birds

The rail-babbler or Malaysian rail-babbler (Eupetes macrocerus) is a brown and pied rail-like ground-living bird. It is the only species in the genus Eupetes and family Eupetidae. It lives on the floor of primary forests in the Malay Peninsula and Sumatra (the nominate subspecies macrocerus), as well as Borneo (ssp. borneensis). It is distantly related to African rockfowl. Its population has greatly decreased because much of the lowland primary forest has been cut, and secondary forests usually have too dense a bottom vegetation or do not offer enough shade to be favourable for the species. However, it is locally still common in logged forest or on hill-forest on slopes, and probably not in immediate danger of extinction. The species is poorly known and rarely seen, in no small part due to its shyness.

== Taxonomy ==
Opinions on the correct taxonomic placement for the rail-babbler have differed. At one time, it was placed in the Old World babbler family, Timaliidae. Until recently, it had been regarded as being related to a group which included the quail-thrushes and whipbirds, and placed in the family Cinclosomatidae (previously in Orthonychidae when the members of the Cinclosomatidae were regarded as belonging with the logrunners). That relationship meant that the blue jewel-babbler of New Guinea was placed in the genus Eupetes until 1940, before being moved to Ptilorrhoa.

However, Serle (1952) had pointed out a number of similarities between this species and the two species of rockfowl (Picathartes): similar proportions, the position of the nostrils, the shape of the forehead, and that of the tail. In 1973 Charles Sibley dismissed the resemblance to Picathartes as "almost certainly the result of convergence", but did suggest it merited further examination. Based on molecular studies, Jønsson et al. (2007) argues that this is closer to the correct position for this species; the rail-babbler is most closely related to the rockjumpers, another early branch of the oscine passerines. As such, it is more correctly placed in a monotypic family, Eupetidae.

== Description ==
It is a medium-sized, fairly slender songbird, about 28 to 30 cm (11–12 in) in length, and weighing 66 to 72 g (2.3–2.5 oz). It has a long thin neck, long black bill, long legs and a long tail. The plumage is mainly brown with a more reddish forehead and crown, and the foreneck, chin and throat are a rich chestnut. It has a long, black eyestripe extending from the bill to the side of the neck and a broad, white supercilium above it. There is a strip of bare, blue skin on the side of the neck which can be seen when the bird calls and displays, and probably has signalling significance in a dark species living in low light on the forest floor. The two sexes are the same. Juvenile birds are similar to the adult but are overall duller in colour, have a whitish throat and dark grey-brown belly. The subspecies borneensis is similar to the nominate race except that the head is a richer brown colour, the upperparts, including the tail, are much more red and the underparts more rufous.

It has a long, monotonous whistling call. When agitated, it gives a series of frog-like notes.

== Distribution and habitat ==
It is found on the Malay Peninsula in southern Thailand and Peninsular Malaysia and in the Greater Sundas on Sumatra, Borneo and the Natuna Islands. It mainly occurs in tall, lowland forests and also in swamps and heath forest. It sometimes occurs in lower montane forests up to about 1,060 m (3,480 ft) in Peninsular Malaysia and 900 m (3,000 ft) in Sumatra and Borneo. It is believed to be declining due to loss and degradation of the forest and is classed as near threatened.

== Behaviour ==
It is a shy and secretive bird, which lives on the forest floor. It walks like a rail, jerking its head in the manner of a chicken, and it prefers to run rather than fly when disturbed. It feeds mainly on insects, including cicadas, and beetles; spiders and worms. When feeding it will dash after prey items.

Little is known about its breeding habits. The eggs are laid around January and February and fledglings have been seen in June. The nest has been described as being placed near the ground on a pile of dead leaves among the stalks of a plant around 30 cm (12 in) from the ground. It is made of plant fibres and is a cup shape. The clutch is two white unmarked eggs; nothing else is known.

== Bibliography ==
- del Hoyo, J.; Elliot, A. & Christie D. (editors). (2007). Handbook of the Birds of the World. Volume 12: Picathartes to Tits and Chickadees. Lynx Edicions. ISBN 978-84-96553-42-2
