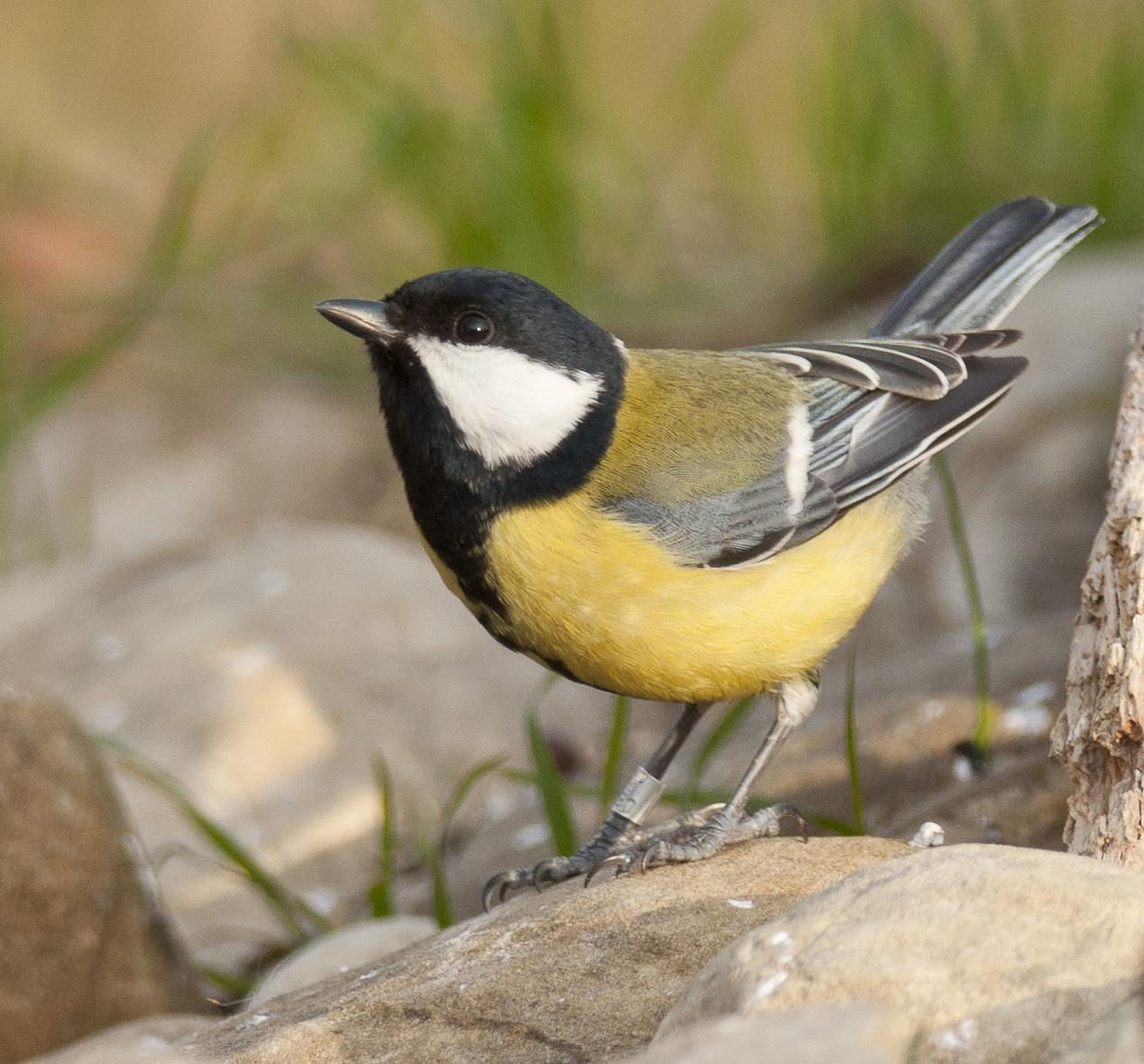
- Great tit

Scientific classification
- Kingdom: Animalia
- Phylum: Chordata
- Class: Aves
- Order: Passeriformes
- Superfamily: Paroidea; Boyd, 2012

= Paroidea =

Paroidea Temporal range: Eocene-Recent, 52.5–0 Ma

Superfamily of birds

The Paroidea are a superfamily of passerine birds.

== Distribution and habitat ==
The superfamily Paroidea is widespread throughout the Northern Hemisphere and in tropical Africa; the greatest concentration of biodiversity occurs in China and in Africa.

== Taxonomy ==
The superfamily Paroidea includes the following families, previously placed in the superfamily Sylvioidea:

- Remizidae Olphe-Galliard, 1891 (11 species)
- Paridae Vigors, 1825 (61 species)
- Stenostiridae Beresford et al., 2005 (9 species)
