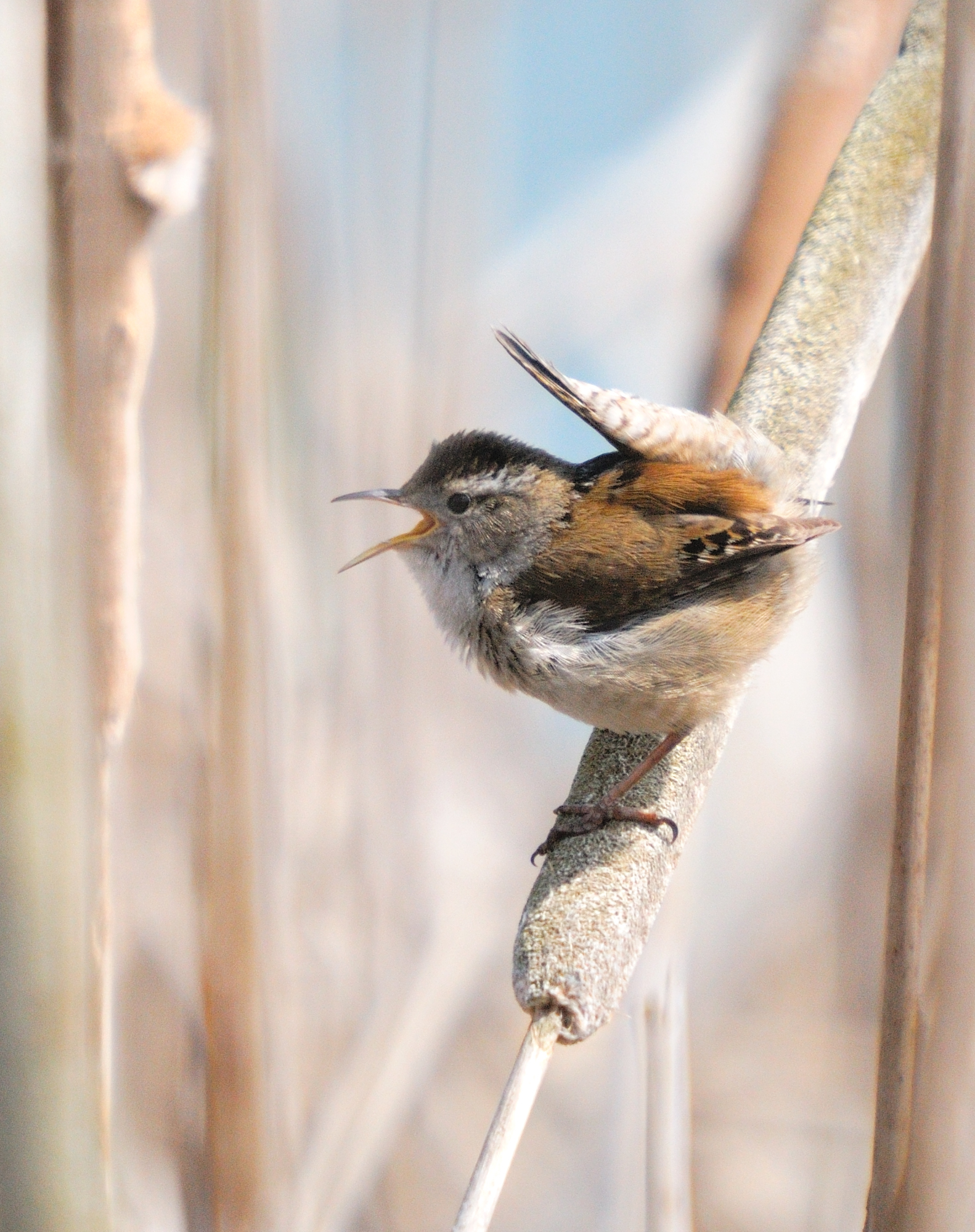
- Marsh wren (Cisthorus palustris)

Scientific classification
- Domain: Eukaryota
- Kingdom: Animalia
- Phylum: Chordata
- Class: Aves
- Order: Passeriformes
- Parvorder: Muscicapida
- Superfamily: Certhioidea

Families
- Tichodromidae; Sittidae; Salpornithidae; Certhiidae; Troglodytidae; Polioptilidae

= Certhioidea =

Certhoidea Temporal range: Miocene–Holocene

Superfamily of birds

Certhioidea is a superfamily belonging to the infraorder Passerida containing wrens and their allies. It was proposed in 2004 by Cracraft and colleagues to house a clade of four families that were removed from the superfamily Sylvioidea.

== Classification ==
In 2019 Carl Oliveros and colleagues published a large molecular phylogenetic study of the passerines that included species from each of the six families that make up the superfamily Certhioidea. The spotted creepers (genus Salpornis) have sometimes been placed in the family Certhiidae. Edward Dickinson and Leslie Christidis in the fourth edition of the Howard and Moore Complete Checklist of the Birds of the World placed them in their own family Salpornithidae.

- Certhioidea
  - Tichodromidae: wallcreeper – 1 species
  - - Sittidae: nuthatches – 29 species
    - - - Salpornithidae: spotted creepers – 2 species
        - Certhiidae: treecreepers – 9 species
      - - Polioptilidae: gnatcatchers – 22 species
        - Troglodytidae: wrens – 96 species

Relationships among families in the superfamily Certhioidea.
