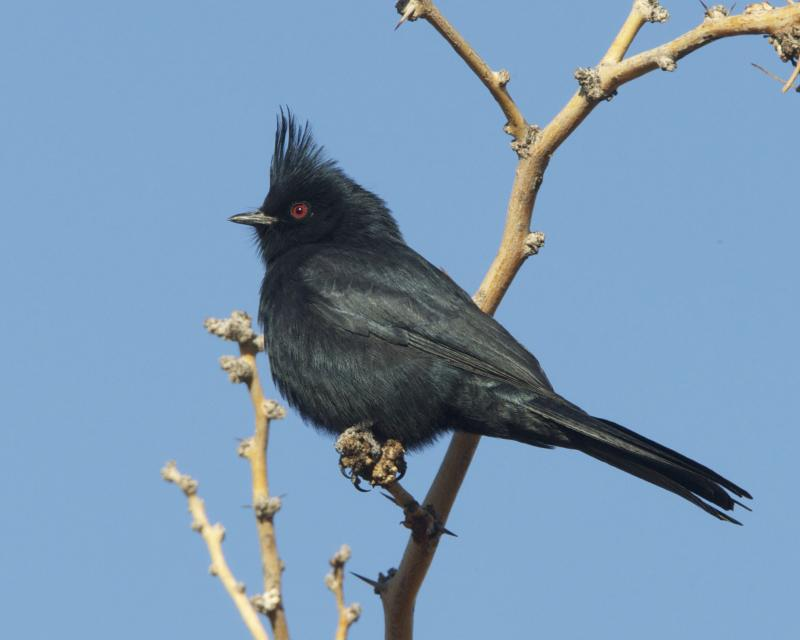
- Male
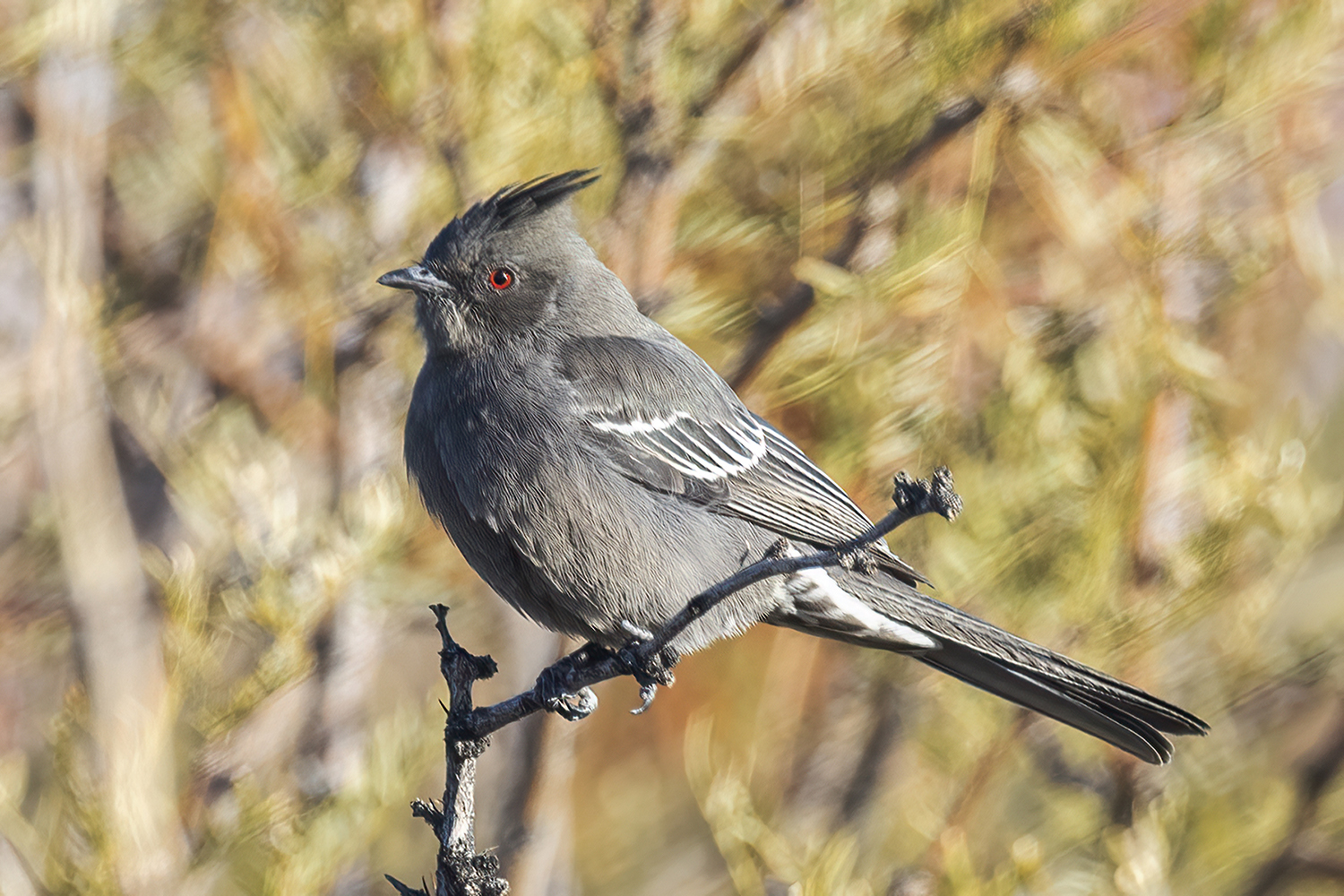
- Female

Conservation status
- Least Concern (IUCN 3.1)

Scientific classification
- Kingdom: Animalia
- Phylum: Chordata
- Class: Aves
- Order: Passeriformes
- Family: Ptiliogonatidae
- Genus: Phainopepla; S.F. Baird, 1858
- Species: P. nitens

Binomial name
- Phainopepla nitens (Swainson, 1838)

= Phainopepla =

Genus of birds

The phainopepla or northern phainopepla (Phainopepla nitens) is the most northerly representative of the mainly tropical Central American family Ptiliogonatidae, the silky flycatchers. Its name is from the Greek phain pepla meaning "shining robe" in reference to the male's plumage.

== Description ==
The phainopepla is a striking bird, 16–20 cm (6.3–7.9 in) long with a noticeable crest and a long tail; it is slender, and has an upright posture when it perches. Its bill is short and slender. The male is glossy black and has a white wing patch that is visible when it flies; the female is plain gray and has a lighter gray wing patch. Both sexes have red eyes, but these are more noticeable in the female than the male.

== Range and habitat ==
The phainopepla ranges as far north as central California with the San Joaquin Valley and southern Utah, and south to central Mexico, the interior Mexican Plateau region; the southern edge of the plateau, the transverse mountains is its non-breeding home. It is found in hot areas, including desert oases, and is readily seen in the deserts of Arizona, southern Nevada, and southern California; also the Baja Peninsula, both Baja California-(north), and Baja California Sur where they are the only breeding resident birds. Extreme individuals have travelled as far as Canada, with one bird in 2009 reaching as far north as Brampton, Ontario, Canada.

== Diet ==
Their diet consists of berries, any small insects, fruits, vegetables. Phainopeplas have a specialized mechanism in their gizzard that shucks berry skins off the fruit and packs the skins separately from the rest of the fruit into the intestines for more efficient digestion.

=== Symbiosis with desert mistletoe ===
Phainopepla are closely associated with desert mistletoe, and are the most effective dispersers of its seeds. As a mistletoe specialist, phainopepla have a specialized digestive system, and process berries very quickly without the gizzard crushing the seeds; berries are defecated 12–45 minutes after being eaten. As a result, each bird can process hundreds of berries in a day. Phainopepla derive fewer calories from each berry than non-specialist birds, but this ability to eat and quickly process large numbers of berries allows them to meet their daily caloric requirements, while non-specialist birds may not be able to do so on just mistletoe berries. Phainopepla deposit their feces on tree branches. In doing so, the mistletoe seeds within have a host tree to infect after they sprout.

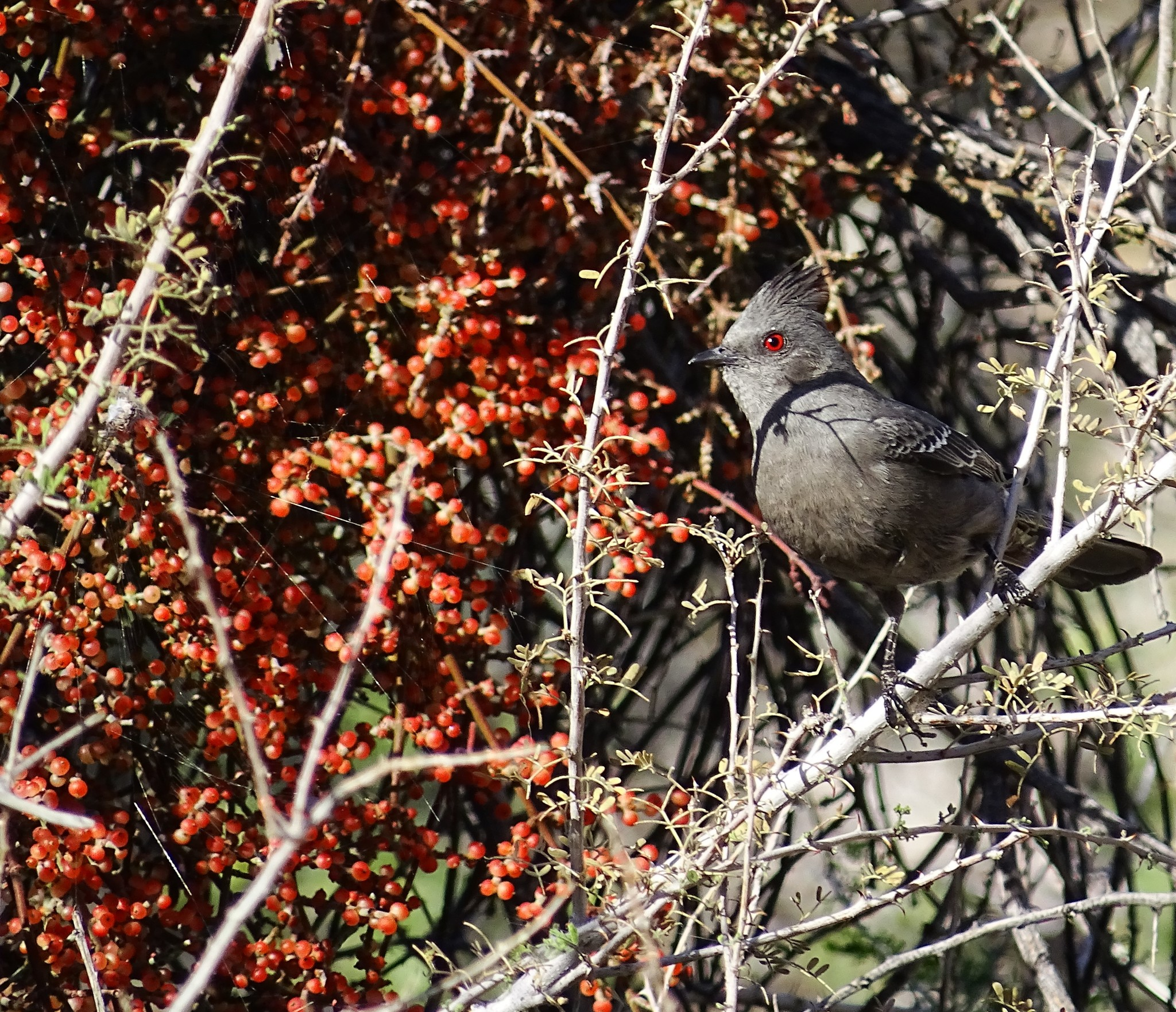
On a desert mistletoe

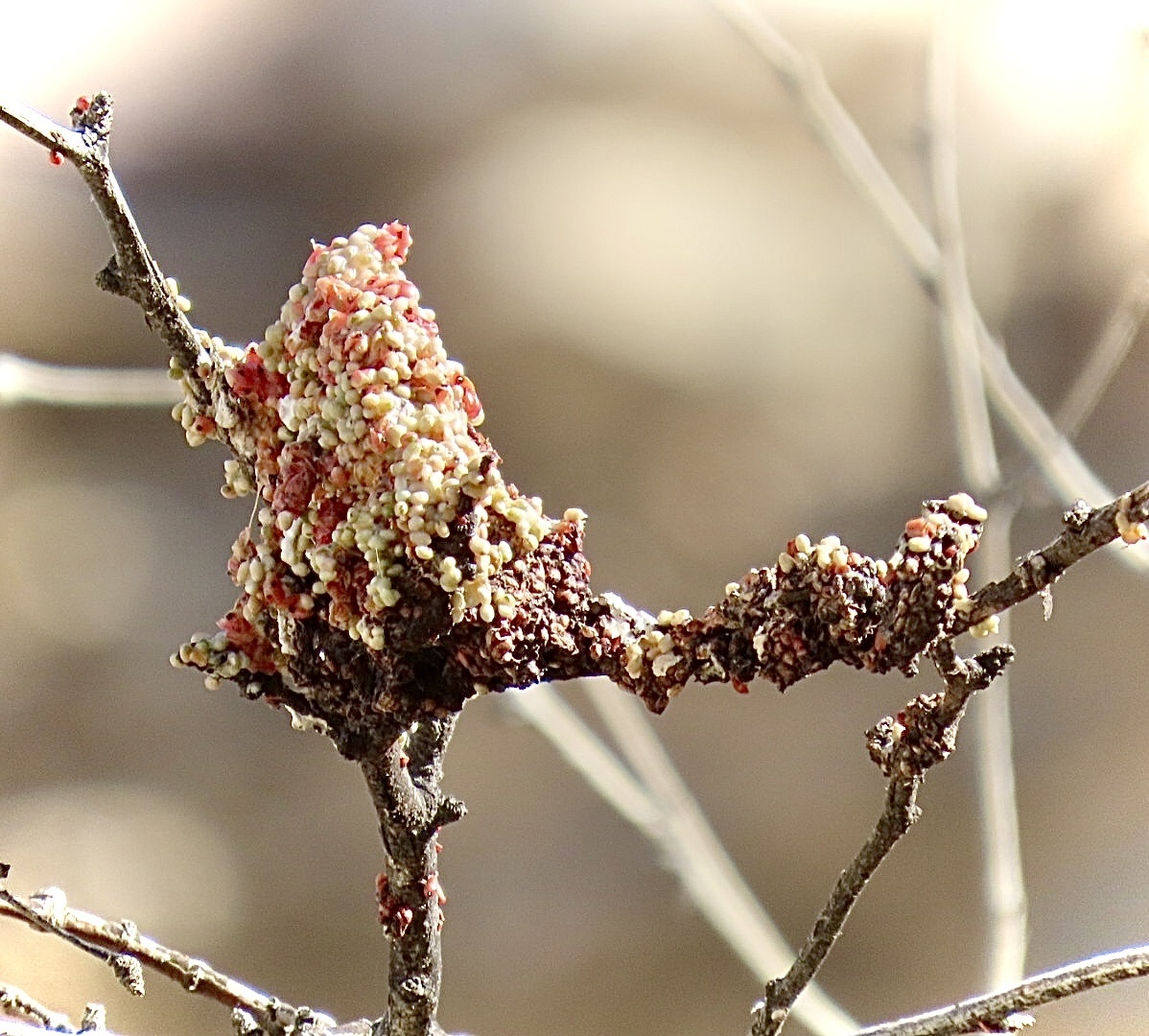
Feces on a tree branch

== Reproduction ==
It nests in the spring. They make loosely constructed nests of twigs, mosses, plant fibers, placed on branches of trees, usually below 20 feet from the ground, in thickets or open woods near water. The eggs are gray or pink and speckled, and the incubation, done by both the male and female, takes fifteen days. The young will be reared by the parents for up to nineteen more days.

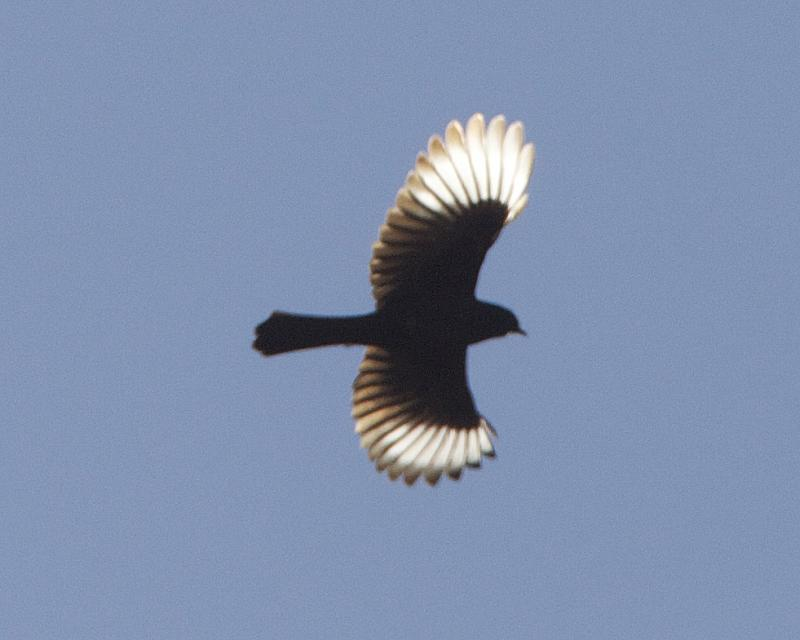
Male in flight showing white wing patches

== Song ==
Phainopeplas have been found to imitate the calls of twelve other species, such as the red-tailed hawk (Buteo jamaicensis) and the northern flicker (Colaptes auratus).
