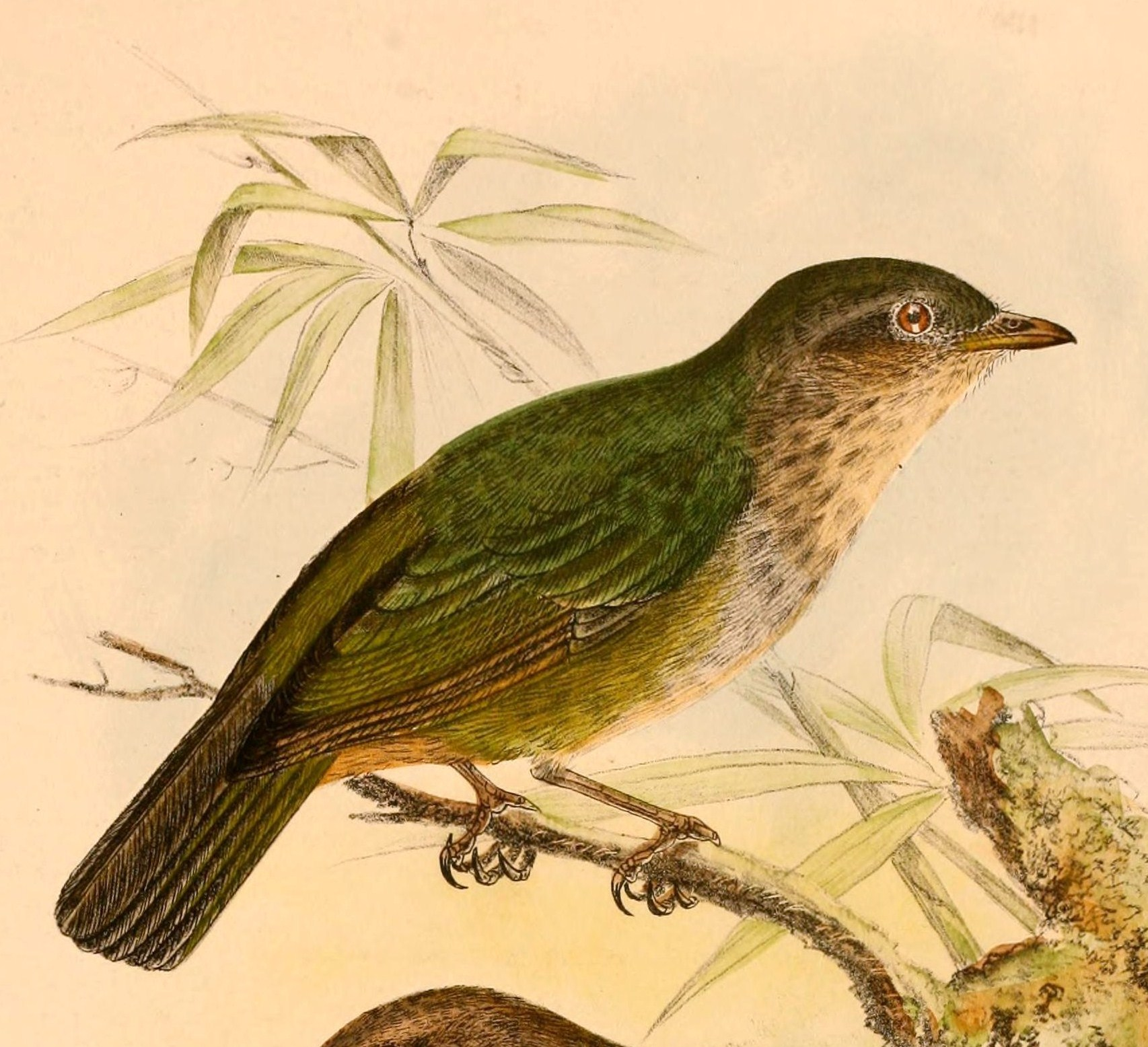

Conservation status
- Least Concern (IUCN 3.1)

Scientific classification
- Kingdom: Animalia
- Phylum: Chordata
- Class: Aves
- Order: Passeriformes
- Superfamily: Bombycilloidea
- Family: Hylocitreidae; Fjeldsa, Ericson, Johannson, & Zuccon 2015
- Genus: Hylocitrea; Mathews, 1925
- Species: H. bonensis

Binomial name
- Hylocitrea bonensis (Meyer & Wiglesworth, 1894)

= Hylocitrea =

Genus of birds

The hylocitrea (Hylocitrea bonensis), also known as the yellow-flanked whistler or olive-flanked whistler, is a species of bird endemic to montane forests on the Indonesian island of Sulawesi. It is monotypic within the genus Hylocitrea. It was traditionally considered a member of the family Pachycephalidae, but recent genetic evidence suggests it should be placed in a monotypic family of its own, Hylocitreidae, related to the waxwings in the family Bombycillidae, the hypocolius in the family Hypocoliidae, the palmchat in the family Dulidae, the silky-flycatchers in the family Ptiliogonatidae, and the now-extinct Hawaiian family Mohoidae (Hawaiian honeyeaters). Some earlier authors took a broader view of this group, treating them as subfamilies in a wider family Bombycillidae, but they are now considered sufficiently diverse and ancient to be classified as a superfamily Bombycilloidea comprising these several families. Within the group, Hylocitrea was found to be a sister group to a clade containing the hypocolius (Hypocoliidae) and the extinct Mohoidae, with the clade containing all three being a sister group to the silky-flycatchers (Ptiliogonatidae). The divergences forming these families occurred in the early Miocene, about 20-23 million years ago.
