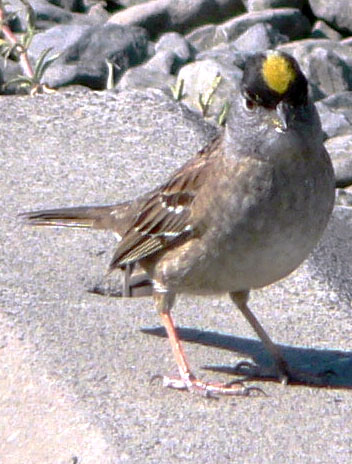
- Golden-crowned sparrow (Zonotrichia atricapilla)

Scientific classification
- Kingdom: Animalia
- Phylum: Chordata
- Class: Aves
- Order: Passeriformes
- Suborder: Passeri
- Infraorder: Passerides

Clades
- Cnemophilidae; Melanocharitidae; Notiomystidae; Callaeidae; Eupetidae; Chaetopidae; Picathartidae; Petroicidae; Sylviida; Muscicapida; Passerida

= Passerides =

Bird clade in the order of Passeriformes

Passerides is a clade of birds in the order Passeriformes.

== Systematics ==
Passerides contains the following families:

- Cnemophilidae
- Melanocharitidae
- Notiomystidae
- Callaeidae
- Eupetidae
- Chaetopidae
- Picathartidae
- Petroicidae
- Parvorder Sylviida
- Parvorder Muscicapida
- Parvorder Passerida
