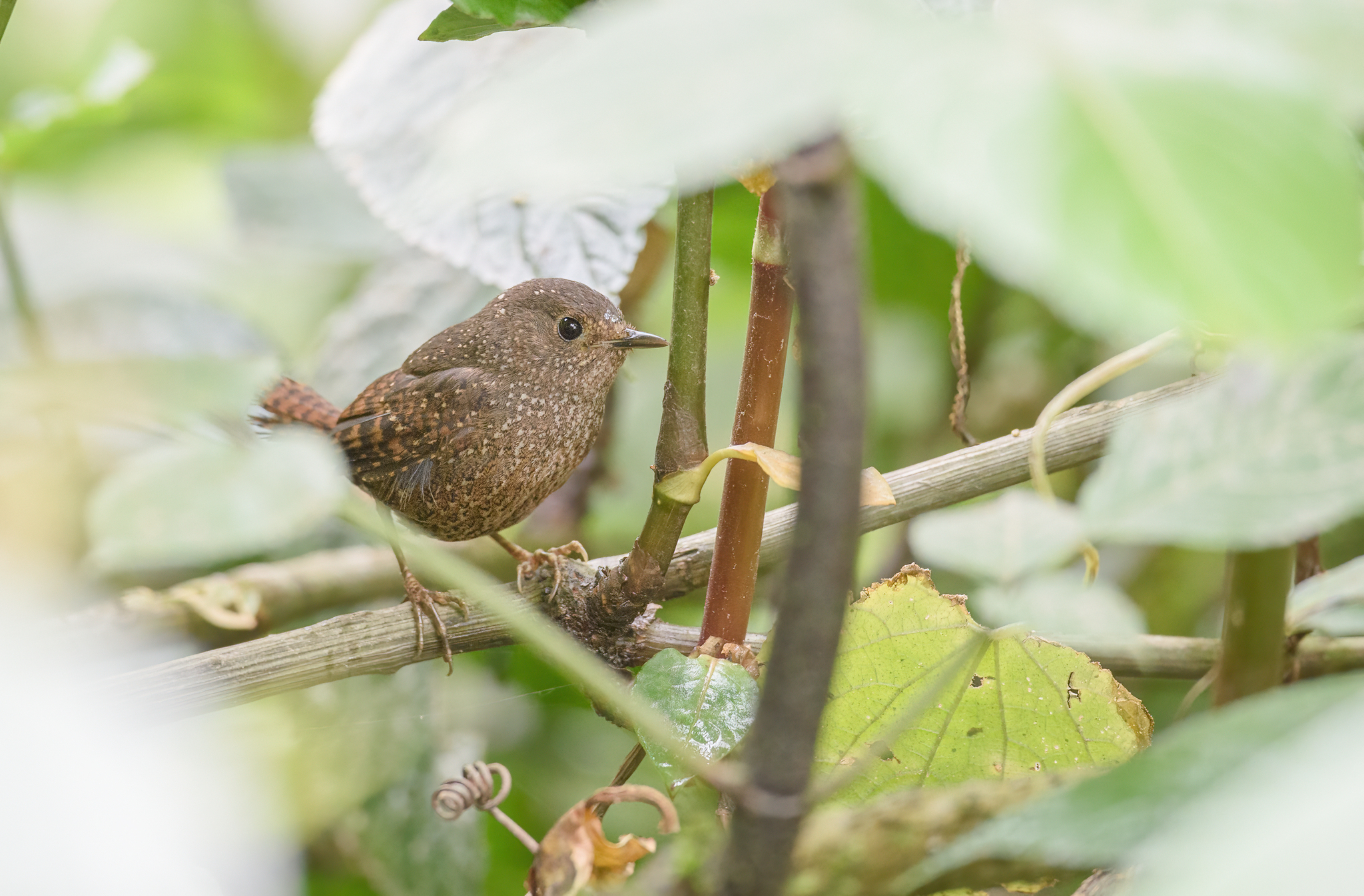
- Songs (recorded in Wuyuan County, Jiangxi)

Conservation status
- Least Concern (IUCN 3.1)

Scientific classification
- Kingdom: Animalia
- Phylum: Chordata
- Class: Aves
- Order: Passeriformes
- Superfamily: Muscicapoidea
- Family: Elachuridae; Alström et al., 2014
- Genus: Elachura; Oates, 1889
- Species: E. formosa

Binomial name
- Elachura formosa (Walden, 1874)

Synonyms
- Spelaeornis formosus

= Spotted elachura =

Species of bird

The spotted elachura or spotted wren-babbler (Elachura formosa) is a species of passerine bird found in the forests of the eastern Himalayas and Southeast Asia. In the past it was included in the babbler genus Spelaeornis as S. formosus, but molecular phylogenetic studies in 2014 provided evidence that it was distinct from the babblers, having no other close living relatives within the passerine bird clade Passerida. This led to the creation of a new family, Elachuridae, to accommodate just one species (a monotypic taxon).

== Description ==
The spotted elachura measures 10 cm including its short tail. It is dark brown all over, with rufous wings and tail. It also has white speckles all over its body, shifting to black barring on its wings and tail.

== Habitat and distribution ==
It is found in Bangladesh, Bhutan, China, India, Laos, Myanmar, Nepal, and Vietnam. Its natural habitat is subtropical or tropical moist montane forests. This species is found in undergrowth and dense thickets of this type of forest, with a preference for thick fern ground cover, mossy rocks and decaying trunks of fallen trees and brushwood (often near a stream or creek), long grass, and scrub.
