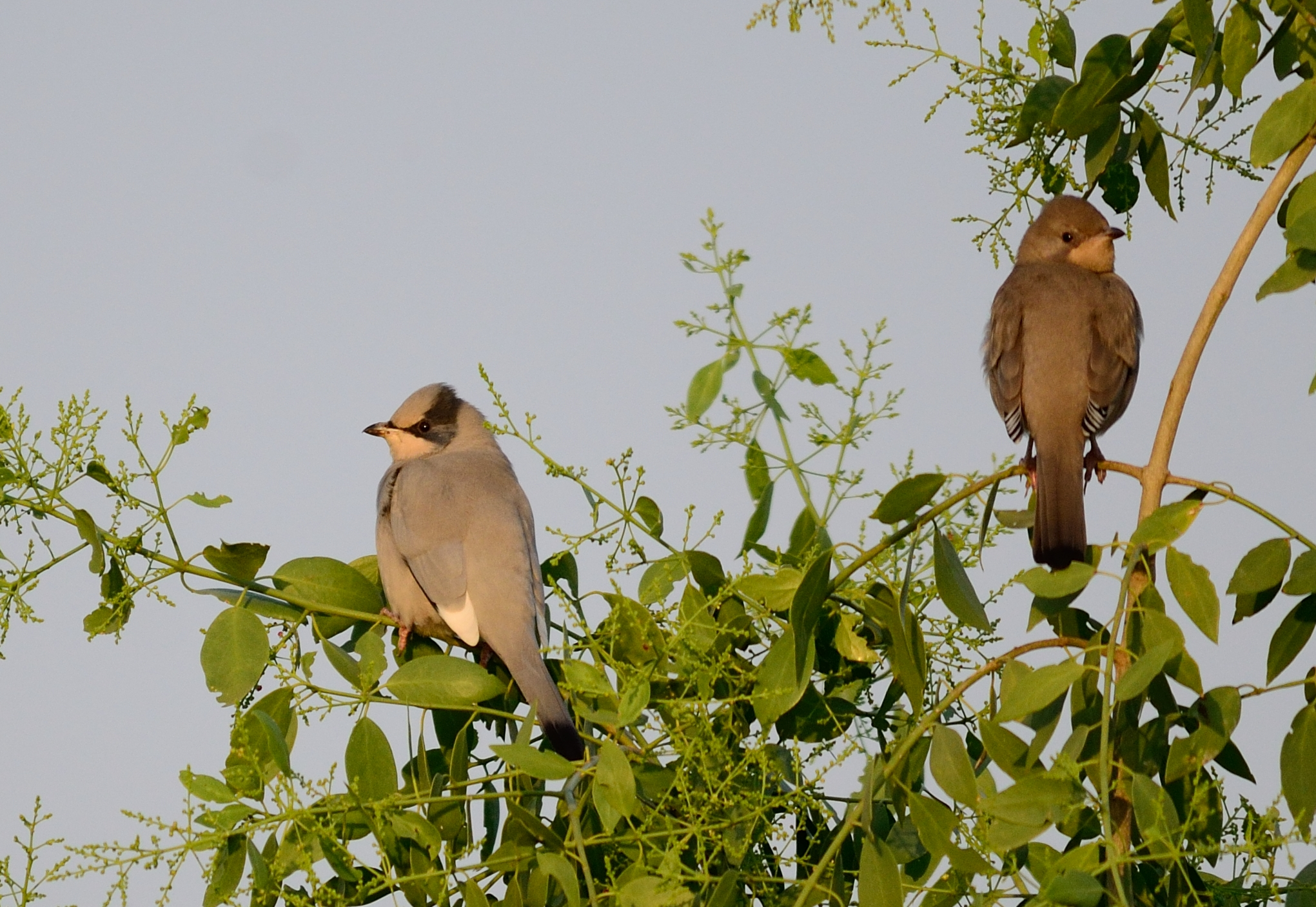
- Male (left) and female (Great Rann of Kutch)

Conservation status
- Least Concern (IUCN 3.1)

Scientific classification
- Kingdom: Animalia
- Phylum: Chordata
- Class: Aves
- Order: Passeriformes
- Superfamily: Bombycilloidea
- Family: Hypocoliidae; Delacour & Amadon, 1949
- Genus: Hypocolius; Bonaparte, 1850
- Species: H. ampelinus

Binomial name
- Hypocolius ampelinus Bonaparte, 1850

= Grey hypocolius =

Species of bird

The grey hypocolius or simply hypocolius (Hypocolius ampelinus) is a small passerine bird species. It is the sole member of the genus Hypocolius and it is placed in a family of its own, the Hypocoliidae. This slender and long tailed bird is found in the dry semi-desert region of northern Africa, Arabia, Afghanistan, Pakistan, and western India. They fly in flocks and forage mainly on fruit but also some insects, migrating south in winter. During migration they are often found feeding on the fruit of Salvadora persica.

== Description ==
The grey hypocolius is a slim bird with a long tail, slight crest and thick, short hook-tipped bill. Its shape and soft, satiny plumage resembles that of the waxwing. Birds are mainly a uniform grey or brownish-grey colour, with males having a black triangular mask around the eyes. They have white-tipped black primary wing feathers and a black terminal band on the tail. Adults are about 19–21 cm (7.5–8.3 in) in length.

The head feathers are raised when the bird is excited. They fly in a straight non-undulating style and when hopping in shrubbery, can appear like a babbler. The tarsus is short and sturdy with coarse scales. There are rictal bristles visible at the base of the bill and the nostrils are exposed, small and oval.

== Taxonomy ==
The relationships of the species were formerly unclear. Earlier authors had suggested that they were related to the bulbuls or shrikes. They appear to be related to the waxwings, and at least one study based on molecular sequences suggests that it belongs to the same group. A 2019 study found them to be in a clade containing the palmchat (Dulidae), waxwings (Bombycillidae), silky-flycatchers (Ptiliogonatidae), hylocitrea (Hylocitreidae), and the extinct Hawaiian honeyeaters (Mohoidae), with Hypocoliidae being a sister group to the Mohoidae (with both diverging about 15-20 mya during the early-mid Miocene), and the clade containing Mohoidae and Hypocoliidae being sister to Hylocitreidae, which diverged slightly earlier in the Miocene.

== Distribution and habitat ==
The grey hypocolius ranges through the Middle East, breeding in the Iraq, Iran, Afghanistan, Pakistan, Turkmenistan area, and wintering mostly near the Red Sea and Persian Gulf coasts of Arabia, including Bahrain. It is a vagrant to Turkey, Israel, Egypt and Oman. They are regular winter visitors to the Kutch and Jamnagar region of western India and vagrants have been noted as far south as Kihim near Bombay. It is found in woodland and scrub in arid and semiarid regions, especially river valleys near deserts, as well as in irrigated and cultivated areas with trees, sea costal area, palm groves and gardens.

== Behaviour ==
The grey hypocolius is a shy and unobtrusive, even cryptic, bird which will fly to thick cover when disturbed, where it will remain motionless until the perceived danger has passed. Its flight is strong and direct, without undulation. It will form flocks, especially in winter, and roost communally.

=== Breeding ===
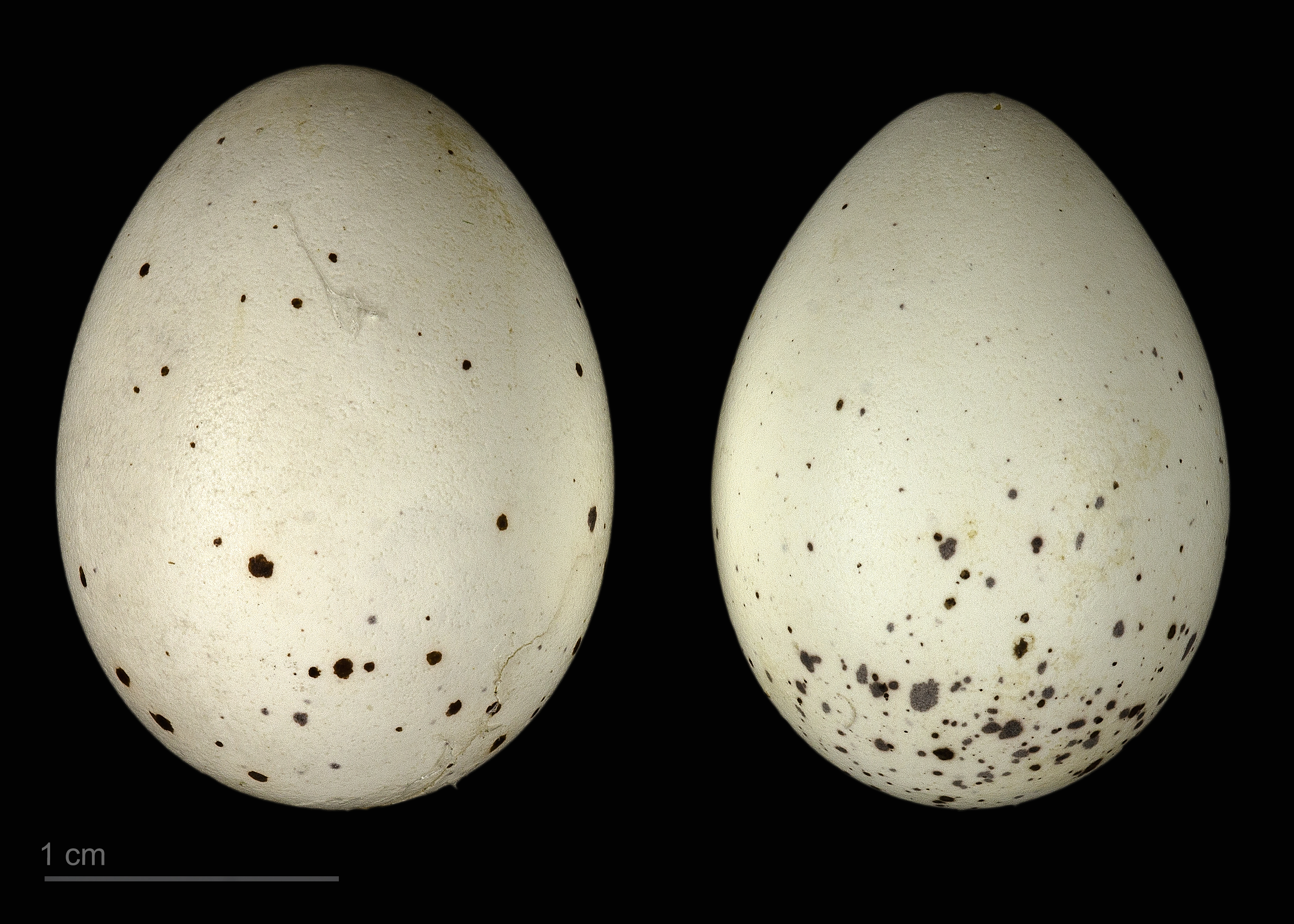
Hypocolius ampelinus - (MHNT)

The breeding season is mid May to mid July in Arabia, typically with two broods. The nest is cup shaped and deep lined with hair and fluff. The nest is typically placed in thorny shrubs or on the leaves of a date palm, at a height of 1–4 metres above the ground. Both the male and female take part in nest building. The clutch is three to five eggs. The eggs are leaden white with blotches. Both parents incubate and feed the chicks; hatching is after 14–15 days, and fledging 13–14 days after hatching. They are moderately gregarious during the breeding season, nesting in loose colonies of up to 40 pairs, each pair defending only a small area immediately around the nest.

=== Feeding ===
Grey hypocolius forages quietly and methodically in foliage, through clusters of trees, palm groves and orchards. It mostly takes fruit in the canopy, but also readily comes to the ground to eat fallen fruit, particularly dates. They eat some insects, but their main diet consists of fruit and berries, including Salvadora persica (arak), dates, mulberries, jujube, and figs. Insects may be taken both on the ground and in flight. In captivity they have been known to take bread readily.

=== Calls ===
The most common call is a series of squealing descending notes or kleeeu whistles. Other calls include scolding chirps.

== Conservation ==
Because the species has a large range, and because it does not meet the population size and decline criteria of the IUCN Red List, the conservation status is evaluated as being of "least concern". Because of its monotypic family status it is much sought after by birdwatchers.

== Gallery ==
The male has a conspicuous black face mask

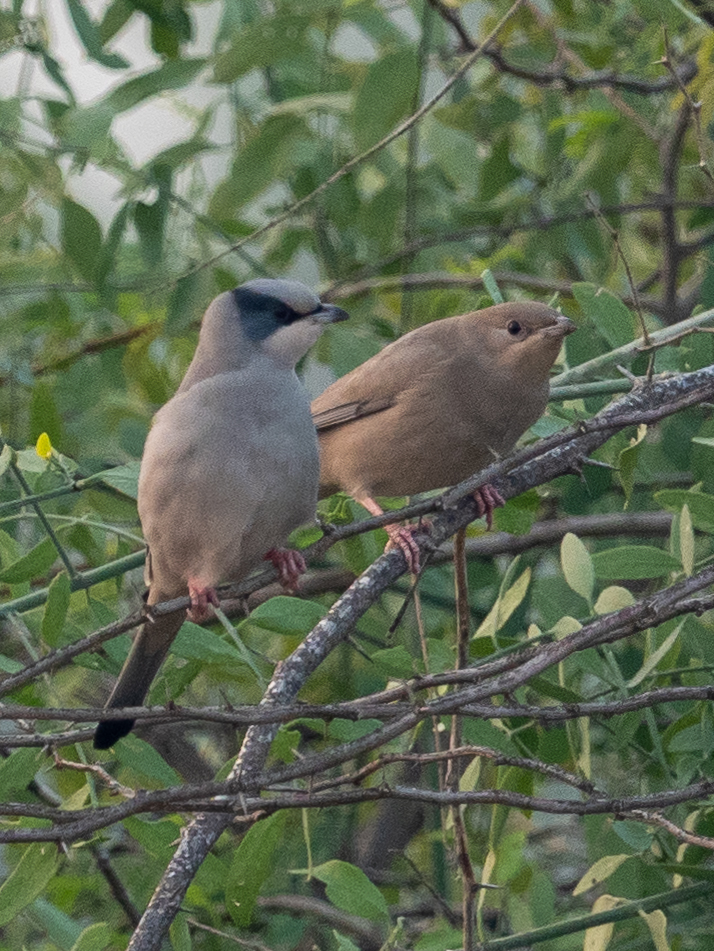
Male and female

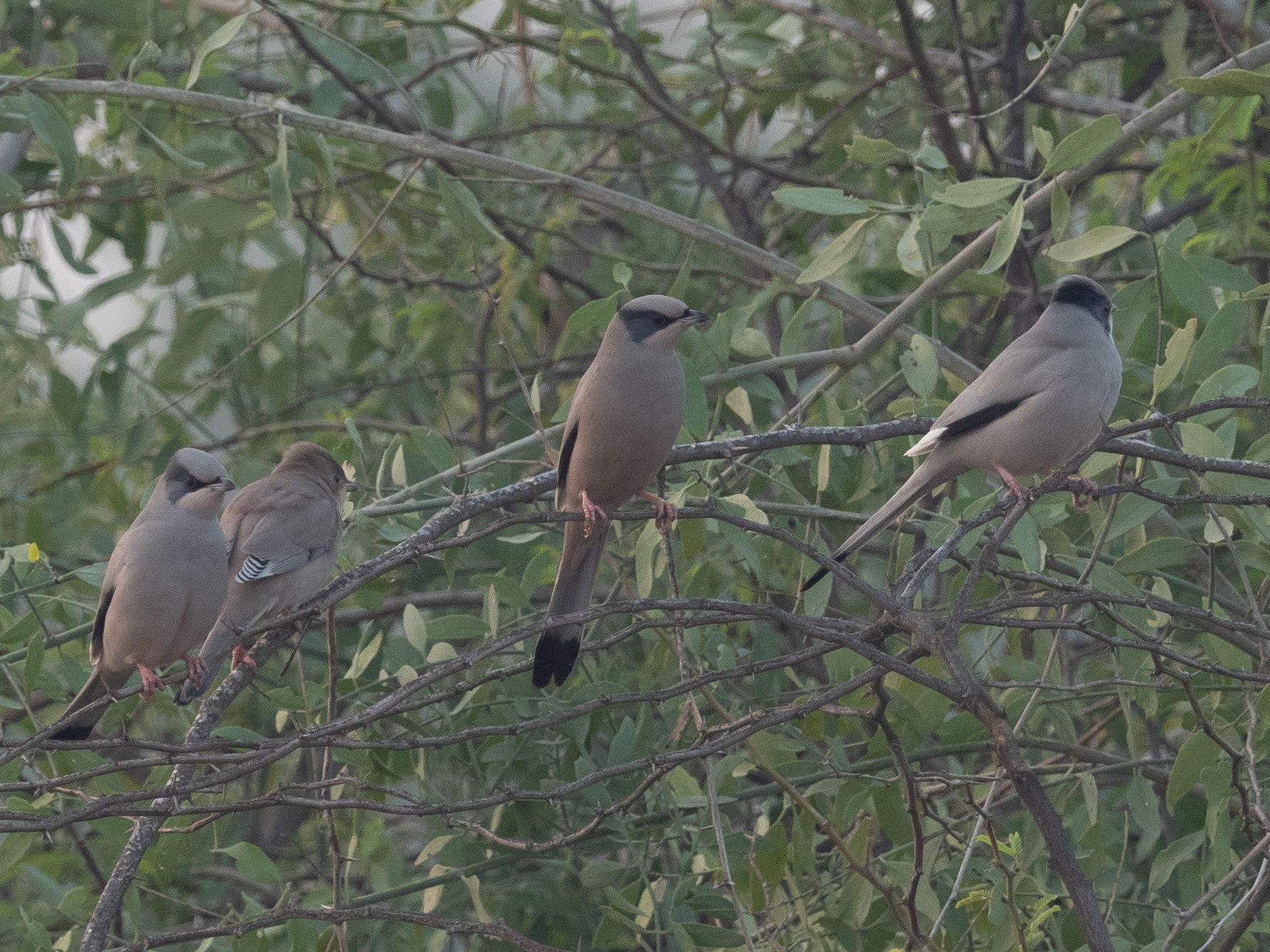
A flock

Female, in Riyadh, Saudi Arabia
