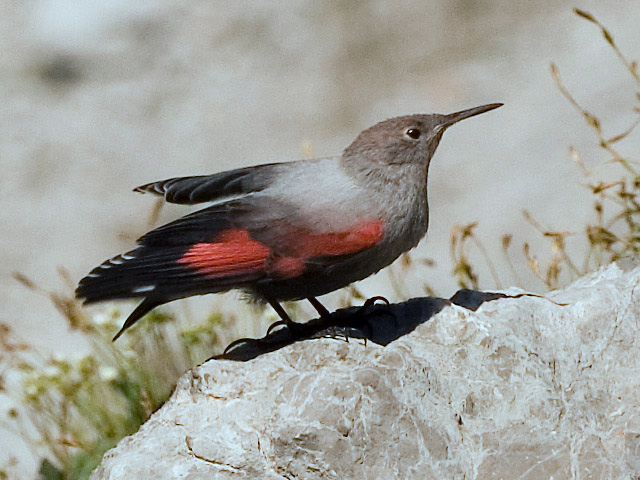

Scientific classification
- Kingdom: Animalia
- Phylum: Chordata
- Class: Aves
- Order: Passeriformes
- Superfamily: Certhioidea
- Family: Tichodromidae; Swainson, 1827
- Genus: Tichodroma; Illiger, 1811

Species
- Tichodroma muraria (wallcreeper); †Tichodroma capeki

= Tichodroma =

Tichodroma Temporal range: Late Miocene - Recent

Genus of bird

Tichodroma is the only known genus in the family Tichodromidae. The wallcreeper (Tichodroma muraria) is the only extant species, but the extinct Tichodroma capeki is known from the Late Miocene of Polgárdi, Hungary. Initially, Linnaeus placed the wallcreeper in the family Certhiidae, along with the treecreepers, while other authorities have placed it the nuthatch family Sittidae, as its own subfamily. A 2016 phylogenetic study of members in the superfamily Certhioidea suggests it is a sister of the Sittidae.

- Certhioidea
  - Tichodromidae: wallcreeper – 1 species
  - - Sittidae: nuthatches – 29 species
    - - - Salpornithidae: spotted creepers – 2 species
        - Certhiidae: treecreepers – 9 species
      - - Polioptilidae: gnatcatchers – 20 species
        - Troglodytidae: wrens – 96 species

Relationships among families in the superfamily Certhioidea.
