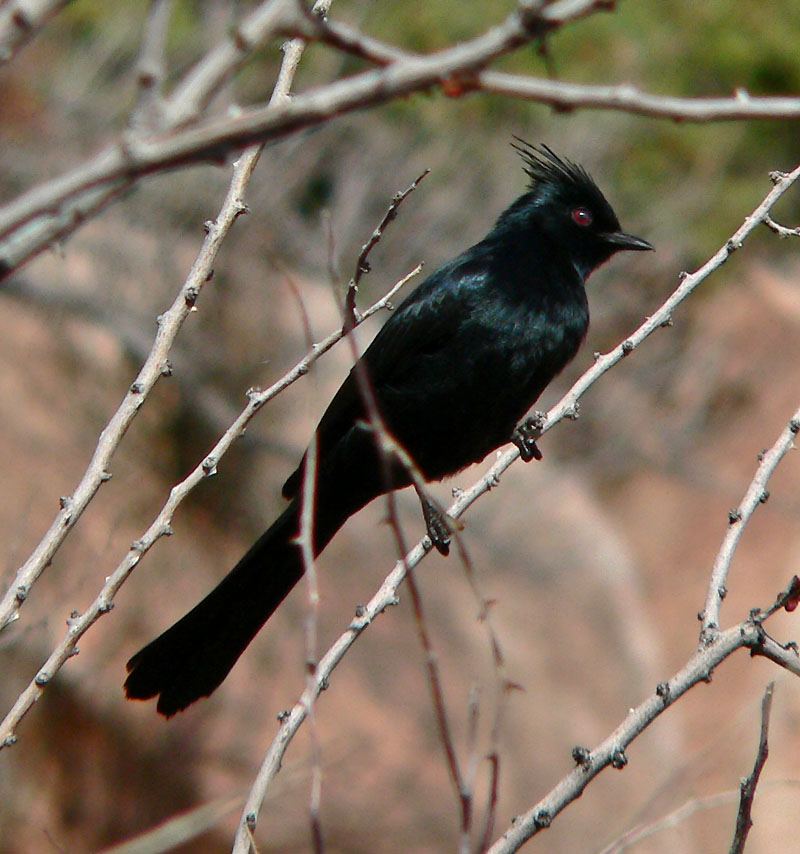
- Phainopepla (Phainopepla nitens)

Scientific classification
- Kingdom: Animalia
- Phylum: Chordata
- Class: Aves
- Order: Passeriformes
- Superfamily: Bombycilloidea
- Family: Ptiliogonatidae; Baird, 1858

Genera
- Phainoptila; Ptiliogonys; Phainopepla

Synonyms
- Ptilogonatidae

= Silky-flycatcher =

Silky-flycatchers

Family of birds

The silky-flycatchers are a small family, Ptiliogonatidae, of passerine birds. The family contains only four species in three genera. They were formerly included in the family Bombycillidae with waxwings, and are also related to the hypocolius in the family Hypocoliidae, the palmchat in the family Dulidae, the hylocitrea in the family Hylocitreidae, and the now-extinct Hawaiian family Mohoidae. The family is named from their silky plumage and their aerial flycatching techniques, although they are only distantly related to the Old World flycatchers (Muscicapidae) and the tyrant flycatchers (Tyrannidae).

They occur mainly in Central America from Panama to Mexico, with one species, the phainopepla, extending northwards into the southwestern US. Most do not engage in long-distance migration (instead wandering widely in search of fruit), but the phainopepla is migratory over the northern part of its range.

Like the waxwings, they have soft silky plumage, but usually black or gray and pale yellow, rather than the pinkish-brown of waxwings. All species, with the exception of the black-and-yellow phainoptila, have small crests. They range in size from 18–25 cm in length and are mostly slender birds (with the exception again of the black-and-yellow phainoptila). All the species in this family are sexually dimorphic in both plumage color and tail length. Juveniles of both sexes are colored like the female.

These birds eat fruit or insects. The phainopepla is particularly dependent on desert mistletoe (Phoradendron californicum) fruit.

They are found in various types of woodland (semi-desert with trees for the phainopepla), and they nest in trees.

== Genera and species ==
Image	Genus	Species
	Phainoptila Salvin, 1877	Black-and-yellow phainoptila (P. melanoxantha)
	Ptiliogonys Swainson, 1827	Grey silky-flycatcher (P. cinereus); Long-tailed silky-flycatcher (P. caudatus)
	Phainopepla S. F. Baird, 1858	Phainopepla (P. nitens)
