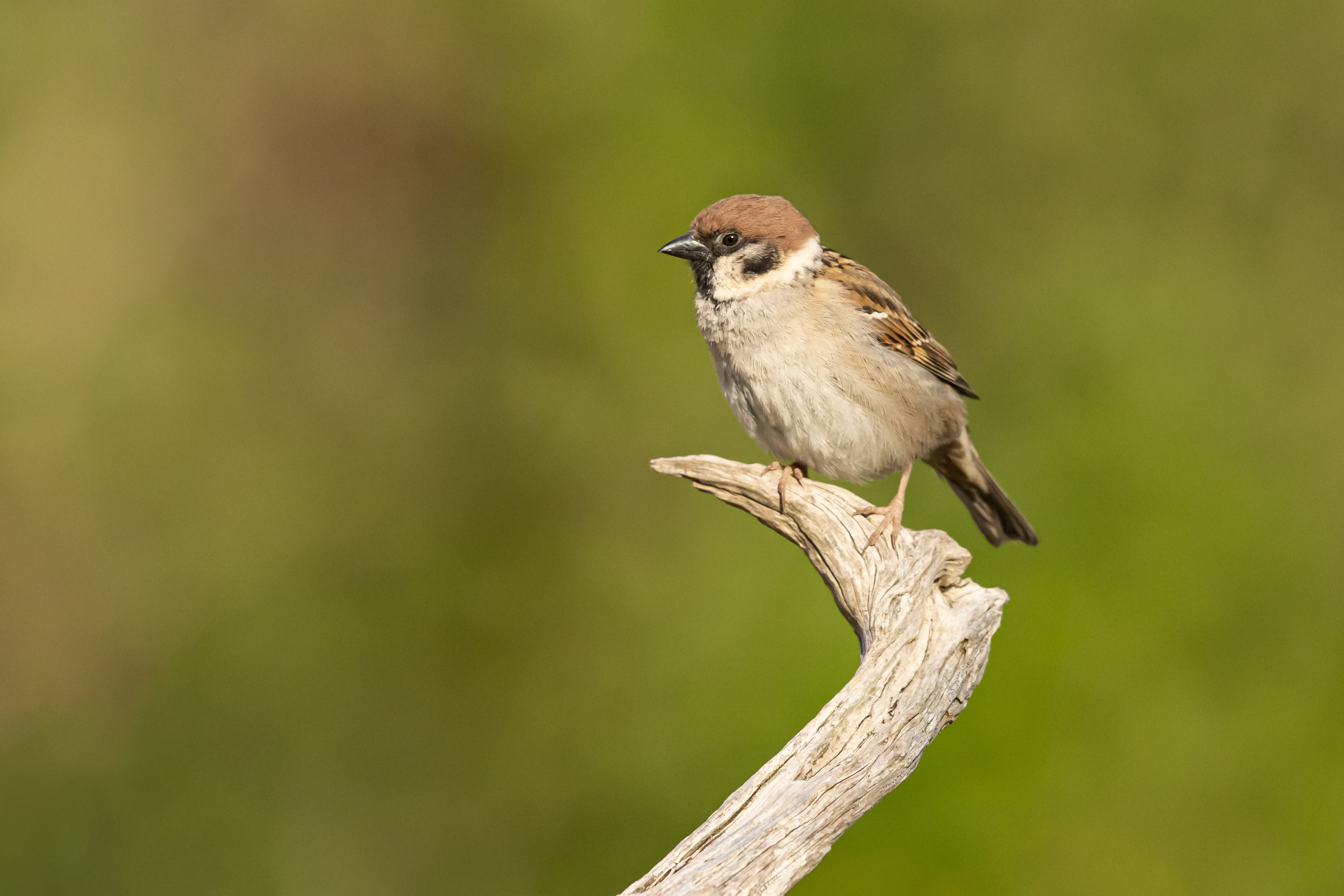
- Eurasian tree sparrow (Passer montanus)

Scientific classification
- Kingdom: Animalia
- Phylum: Chordata
- Class: Aves
- Order: Passeriformes
- Suborder: Passeri
- Infraorder: Passerides
- Parvorder: Passerida

Subdivisions
- See text

= Passerida =

Clade of birds

Passerida are one of four parvorders contained within the infraorder Passerides.

== Characteristics ==
Passerida are omnivorous birds found in East Africa and the Palearctic realm. They live in open areas with minimal trees such as Saharas and forest clearings. They are stocky birds between 12 cm (4.7 inches) and 18 cm (7.1 inches). The head and neck are a blackish-gray, and they have a very short beak.

== Systematics and phylogeny ==
Mostly smallish herbivores, near-global distribution centered on Palearctic and Americas. Often pronounced sexual dimorphism with males among the most colorful birds alive. Songs tend to be fairly simple warbling and chirping, with many species relying as much or more on visual mating displays. Includes the nine-primaried oscines (probably a subclade). The basal radiation is mostly found in the Old World, with only Motacillidae naturally occurring in the Americas and Estrildidae in Australia.

Passerida contains the following families:

- Modulatricidae: robin-babblers
- Promeropidae: sugarbirds
- Nectariniidae: sunbirds
- Dicaeidae: flowerpeckers
- Chloropseidae: leafbirds
- Irenidae: fairy bluebirds
- Passeridae: true sparrows
- Prunellidae: accentors
- Urocynchramidae: Przewalski's finch. Recently split from Fringillidae; tentatively placed here.
- Ploceoidea
  - Estrildidae: estrildid finches (waxbills, munias, etc.)
  - Ploceidae: weavers. Certain members of Ploceidae, such as the long-tailed widowbird are well known for their elaborate sexual ornaments.
  - Viduidae: indigobirds and whydahs
- Motacillidae: wagtails and pipits
- Peucedramidae: olive warbler
- Fringillidae: true finches. Includes the Hawaiian honeycreepers
- Emberizoidea: New World nine-primaried oscine radiation
  - Icteridae: grackles, New World blackbirds, and New World orioles
  - Parulidae: New World warblers
  - Icteriidae: yellow-breasted chat
  - Phaenicophilidae: Hispaniolan tanagers
  - Zeledoniidae: wrenthrush
  - Teretistridae: Cuban warblers
  - Thraupidae: tanagers and allies
  - Mitrospingidae: mitrospingid tanagers and allies
  - Rhodinocichlidae: rosy thrush tanager
  - Calyptophilidae: chat-tanagers
  - Nesospingidae: Puerto Rican tanager
  - Spindalidae: spindalises
  - Cardinalidae: cardinal-grosbeaks
  - Emberizidae: buntings
  - Passerellidae: American sparrows
  - Calcariidae: snow buntings and longspurs

== See also ==
- List of birds
