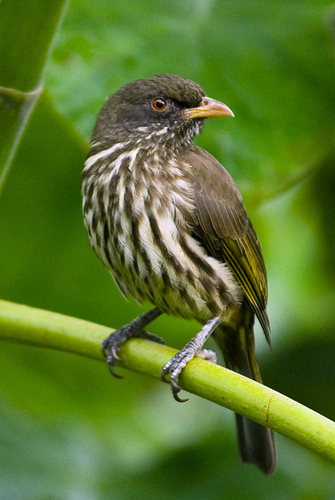

Conservation status
- Least Concern (IUCN 3.1)

Scientific classification
- Kingdom: Animalia
- Phylum: Chordata
- Class: Aves
- Order: Passeriformes
- Superfamily: Bombycilloidea
- Family: Dulidae; P.L. Sclater, 1862
- Genus: Dulus; Vieillot, 1816
- Species: D. dominicus

Binomial name
- Dulus dominicus (Linnaeus, 1766)

Synonyms
- Tanagra dominica Linnaeus, 1766

= Palmchat =

Species of bird endemic to Hispaniola

The palmchat (Dulus dominicus) is a medium-sized passerine bird endemic to the Caribbean island of Hispaniola (split between the Dominican Republic and Haiti). It is the only species in the genus Dulus and the family Dulidae, and is related to the waxwing family Bombycillidae and the silky-flycatchers in Ptiliogonatidae. Its name reflects its strong association with palms for feeding, roosting, and nesting.

== Taxonomy ==
In 1760 the French zoologist Mathurin Jacques Brisson included a description of the palmchat in his Ornithologie based on a specimen collected from the French colony of Saint-Domingue, modern Haiti. He used the French name Le tangara de S. Dominigue and the Latin Tangara Dominicensis. Although Brisson coined Latin names, these do not conform to the binomial system and are not recognised by the International Commission on Zoological Nomenclature. When the Swedish naturalist Carl Linnaeus updated his Systema Naturae for the twelfth edition in 1766, he added 240 species that had been previously described by Brisson, with one of them being the palmchat. Linnaeus included a brief description, coined the binomial name Tanagra dominica and cited Brisson's work.

While Linnaeus placed the palmchat with the euphonias in the tanagers, it was realised in the 19th century that it's closest relatives were the waxwings and silky-flycatchers. P.L. Sclater moved the palmchat to the subfamily Dulinae in his 1862 Catalogue of a collection of American birds, and the species was elevated to a full family by Robert Ridgway in 1904. During the twentieth and twenty-first centuries opinion has been divided on whether the three groups were three families or a single family.

The palmchat is the only species placed in the genus Dulus that was introduced by the French ornithologist Louis Pierre Vieillot in 1816. A second species, Dulus nuchalis, was described by William Swainson in 1838, who attributed it to Brazil. The species was referred to as the white-naped palm chat by Ridgway, who did not know where it was from but assumed it must be from Hispaniola.

The species is monotypic, with no subspecies. Birds from the Gonâve Islands were described as a subspecies, D. d. ovideo, by Alexander Wetmore in 1929, on the basis of plumage differences and a slightly larger size, but this subspecies has not been accepted by other scientists. Wetmore named his subspecies after Gonzalo Fernández de Oviedo y Valdés, an early Spanish colonist to the Caribbean whose chronicles included accounts of the species.

== Description ==
Palmchats are medium-sized passerines, about 18–20 cm (7–8 in) in length and weighing 41–52 g (1.4–1.8 oz). Their appearance has been described as "moderately odd" by the Handbook of the Birds of the World, having relatively small heads, short yet deeply-curved yellow-horn bills and long necks. The wings are long and rounded, and the feet are large and strongly-clawed. The plumage is olive-brown above, and heavily streaked with brown below. Their rumps, as well as the uppertail-coverts, are dark greenish-olive, and the tail is brown. The primary feathers are yellow-green. They lack the soft silky plumage of the waxwings or silky-flycatchers. Adults show no sexual dimorphism in plumage, but the males have slightly larger wings. Immature birds resemble the adults but have darker throats and forenecks and buff-coloured rumps.

== Distribution and habitat ==
The species is endemic to the island of Hispaniola (in both Haiti and the Dominican Republic), and the adjacent Saona and Gonâve Islands, where it is common and widespread. It inhabits areas from sea level to 1,800 m (5,900 ft). The species occupies a wide range of habitats, most commonly open savanna where royal palms are most common, but also other open, semi-open or even broadleaf and pine forest. They are only absent from the highest mountains and dense closed forest. Where its food trees are present, it has adapted well to human-modified habitat such as farmland city parks and gardens.

The species is not thought to be migratory. Some have suggested that it may undertake localised movements after the breeding season, but the only evidence is a slight reduction in observed birds during this period in some areas. The species is a poor disperser and is not found on islands close to Hispaniola, although there is one uncorroborated report of a palmchat from Jamaica.

== Behaviour ==
Palmchats are very sociable birds, often seen in small flocks containing several pairs, which will roost closely together with their bodies in contact.

=== Breeding ===
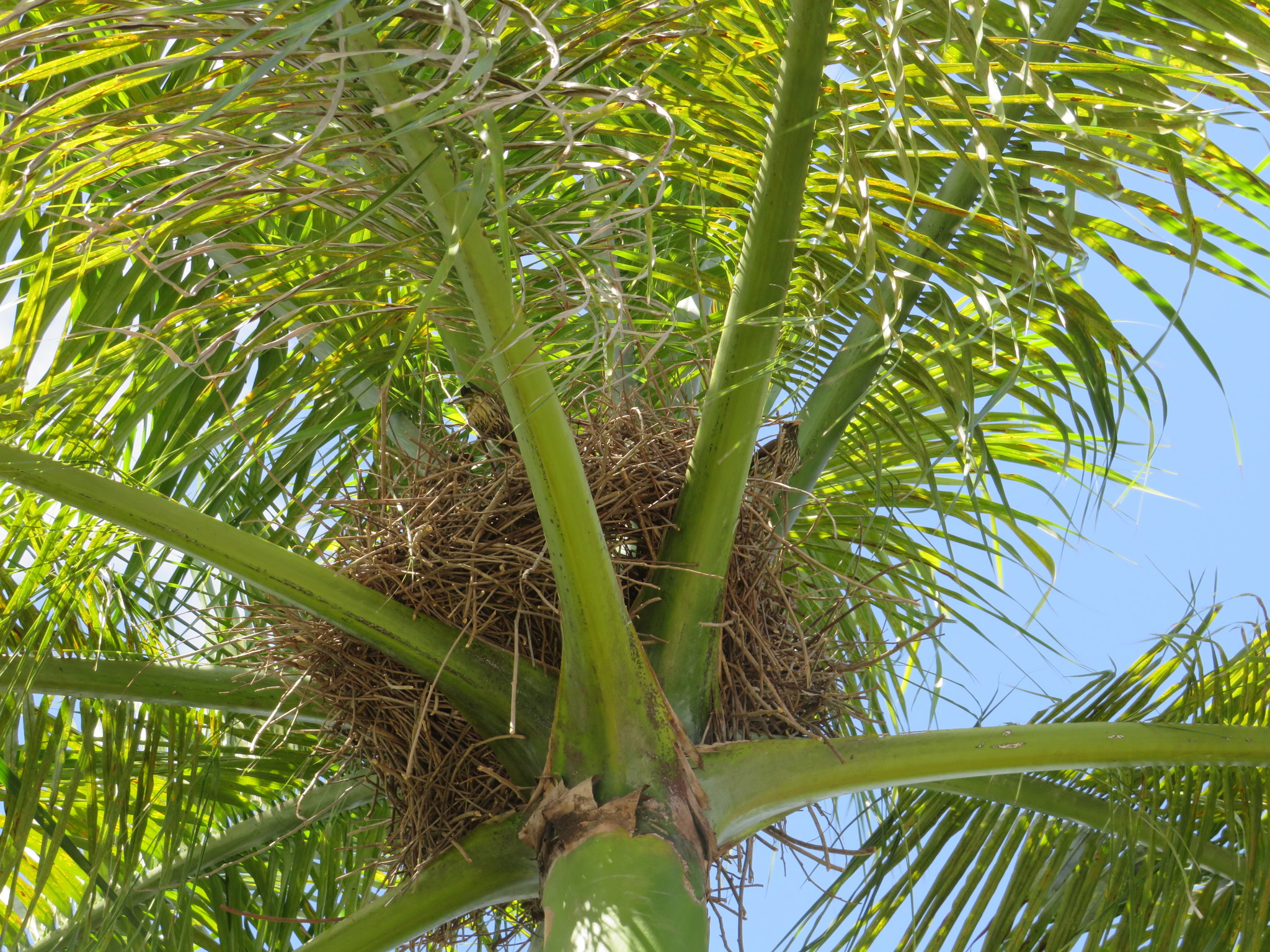
The nest of the palmchat is a large dome of sticks, usually in a palm tree

Palmchats build large, conspicuous, communal nests of twigs which may be up to 2 m (6.6 ft) across, with each pair of palmchat having adjoining nests with their own separate chambers and entrances. These nests are typically occupied by four to ten pairs of palmchats, but nests containing up to 50 have been recorded. The Puerto Rico royal palm, (Roystonea borinquena) and Hispaniolan silver thatch palms (Coccothrinax argentea) are the preferred tree for nesting in, but they will also less frequently nest in cana (Sabal domingensis) and coconut palms (Cocos nucifera), or other trees and even telephone poles may be used. In general, trees selected for nesting tend to be larger (in circumference and height) than those not, and trees with other trees nearby are also seemingly preferred. There has even been one unusual report of a palmchat nest on a rock islet off the coast. An important aspect of nest site selection is that the branches of the selected tree do not touch those of other trees, and therefore nesting rarely occurs in dense forest.

These nests are also used for roosting even outside the breeding season, and are maintained throughout the year. During the non-breeding season individuals will bring twigs to the nest 5% of the time for larger nests, and up to 18% of the time for smaller nests. Twigs were often worked into the nest and manipulated for several minutes, creating structurally sound nests that hold together after falling to the ground.

The breeding season is mainly from March to June. The females lay clutches of 2-7 (mean 4) eggs The eggs of the palmchat are quite variable. They can range in colour from pale green to beige, off-white and cream and can be marked with brown, purple-grey or grey scrawls, speckles or blotches. The incubation period is around 15 days, and the chicks are hatched with dark grey skin and, extremely unusually for passerine birds, without any feathers. Both parents feed the chicks, which fledge after 32 days.

=== Food ===
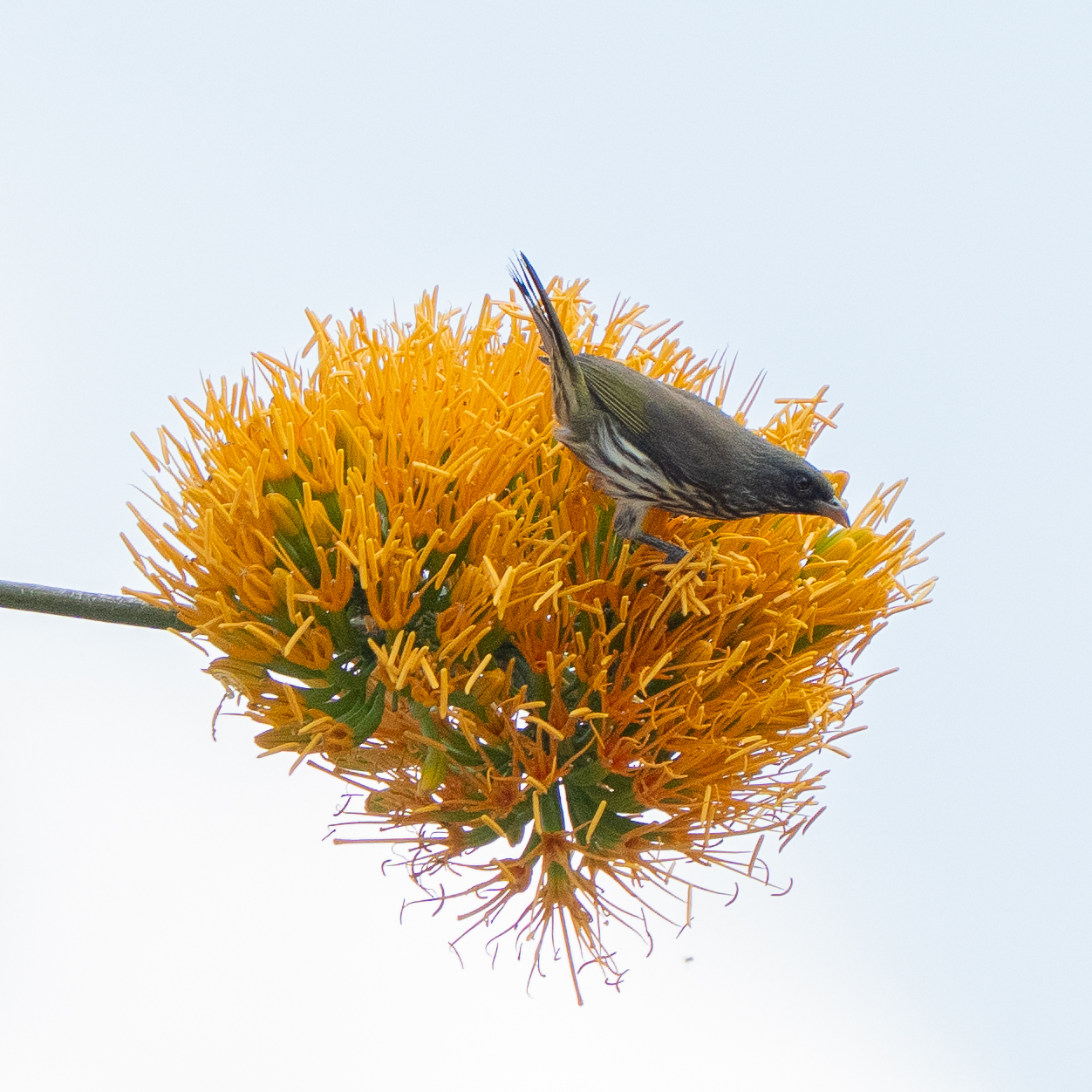
Flowers are a small part of the diet of palmchats

Palmchats feed on predominately on fruit and berries, but will also feed on leaves, flowers and some insects. One study found that 57 out of 58 samples of stomachs examined contained only plant matter. Royal palm fruit forms an important part of the diet, but they will also take the fruit of other palms and of the gumbo-limbo (Bursera simaruba). Insects, when taken, are gleaned from trees or taken on the wing. Food is almost always obtained from trees, more rarely bushes, and never from the ground.

=== Voice ===
The palmchat is a voluble and noisy species, with a large repertoire of gurgling and cheeping sounds constantly used in their social behaviour, but do not have a coherent song. These calls include cheeps, whistles and cawing and may be made singly or together in a sustained chattering that has been compared to a simplified version of the call of the common starling. The specific functions of these calls are not understood, except for an alarm call used by the species. On spotting a bird of prey members of the group will emit a "cheer cheer cheer" whistle that drops in pitch. Once this call has been made the rest of the group will go quiet and any exposed bird will dive into cover.

== Ecology ==
The communal nests of the palmchat are often used by other bird species, even while palmchats are using them, including the mourning dove, Ridgway's hawk, white-necked crow, and ashy-faced owl. The species is targeted by the shiny cowbird, a brood parasite from South America that has been spread through the West Indies.

== Relationship with humans and conservation ==
The palmchat appears to have benefited from human activities in Hispaniola, having adapted well to human-created habitats, and the species is one of if not the most common birds on the island. While some declines have been recorded, it is not approaching the thresholds for the population decline criterion of the IUCN Red List (i.e., declining more than 30% in ten years or three generations), it has been evaluated as being of Least Concern.

The palmchat is the national bird of the Dominican Republic.
