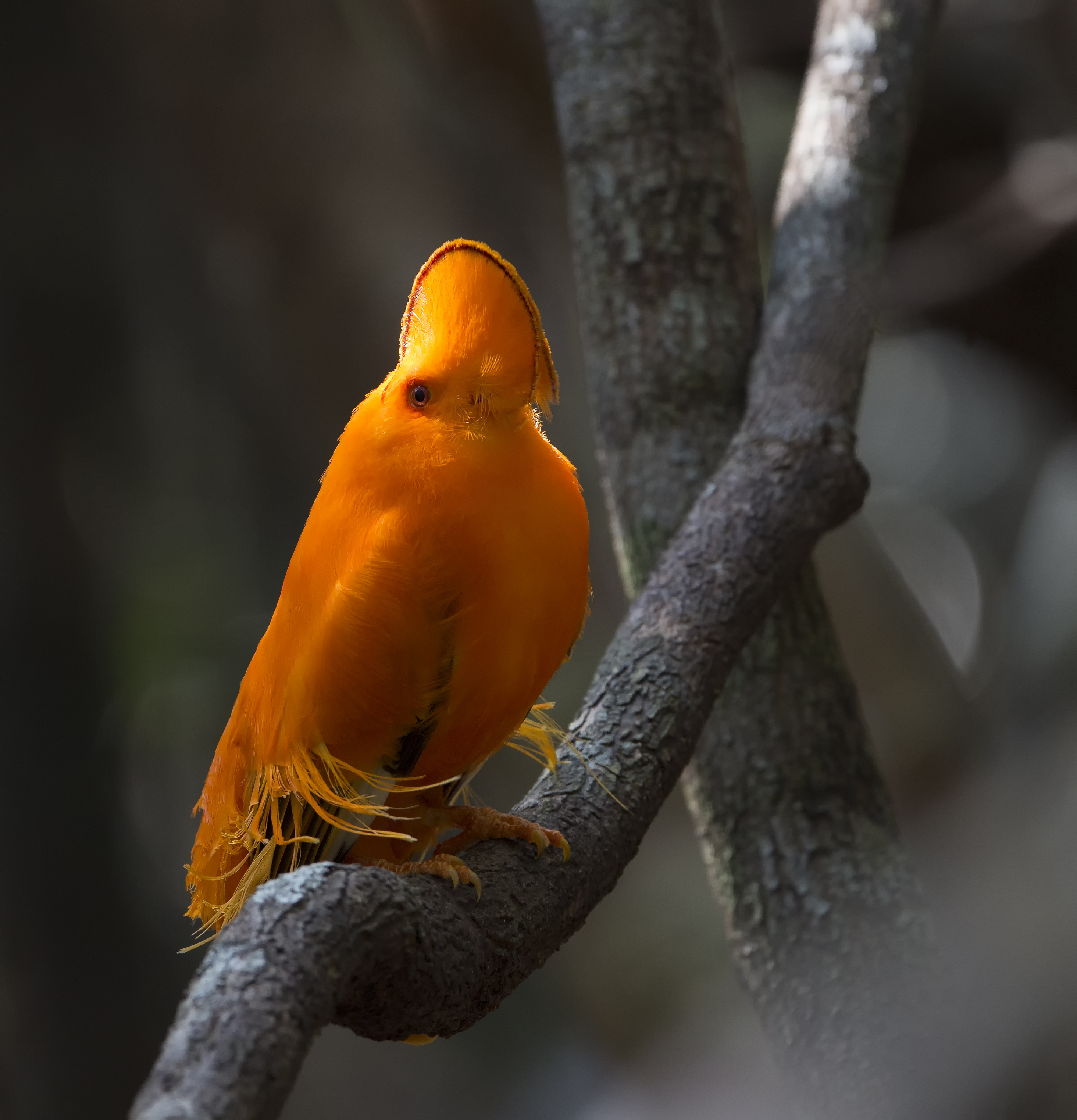
- Guianan cock-of-the-rock (Rupicola rupicola)

Scientific classification
- Kingdom: Animalia
- Phylum: Chordata
- Class: Aves
- Order: Passeriformes
- Suborder: Tyranni
- Infraorder: Tyrannides

Parvorders
- Tyrannida; Furnariida

= Tyrannides =

Clade of birds

Tyrannides (New World suboscines) is a clade of passerine birds that are endemic to the Americas. The group likely originated in South America during the Eocene, about 45 million years ago.

== Taxonomy ==
The Tyrannides is divided into two clades (Furnariida and Tyrannida) that contain thirteen families. The families listed here are those recognised by the International Ornithologists' Union (IOC).

- Parvorder Tyrannida
  - Pipridae: manakins
  - Cotingidae: cotingas
  - Tityridae: tityras, becards
  - Tyrannidae: tyrant-flycatchers (includes Piprites, Platyrinchus, Tachuris and Rhynchocyclus)
  - Oxyruncidae: sharpbill
  - Onychorhynchidae: royal flycatchers and myiobiuses
- Parvorder Furnariida
  - Melanopareiidae: crescent chests
  - Conopophagidae: gnateaters and gnatpittas
  - Thamnophilidae: antbirds
  - Grallariidae: antpittas
  - Rhinocryptidae: tapaculos
  - Formicariidae: antthrushes
  - Furnariidae: ovenbirds and woodcreepers (includes Dendrocolaptidae)

=== Phylogeny ===
The cladogram below showing the family level phylogenetic relationships of the Tyrannides is based on a molecular genetic study by Carl Oliveros and collaborators published in 2019. The families and species numbers are from the list maintained by the International Ornithologists' Union (IOC).

- Tyrannides
  - Tyrannida
    - Pipridae – 55 species (manakins)
    - - Cotingidae – 66 species (cotingas)
      - - Tityridae – 37 species (tityras, becards)
        - - Tyrannidae – 447 species (tyrant flycatchers)
          - - Oxyruncidae – sharpbill
            - Onychorhynchidae – 7 species (royal flycatchers, myiobiuses)
  - Furnariida
    - - Melanopareiidae – 5 species (crescentchests)
      - - Conopophagidae – 12 species (gnateaters)
        - Thamnophilidae – 238 species (antbirds)
    - - Grallariidae – 70 species (antpittas)
      - - Rhinocryptidae – 65 species (tapaculos)
        - - Formicariidae – 12 species (antthrushes)
          - Furnariidae – 321 species (ovenbirds)
