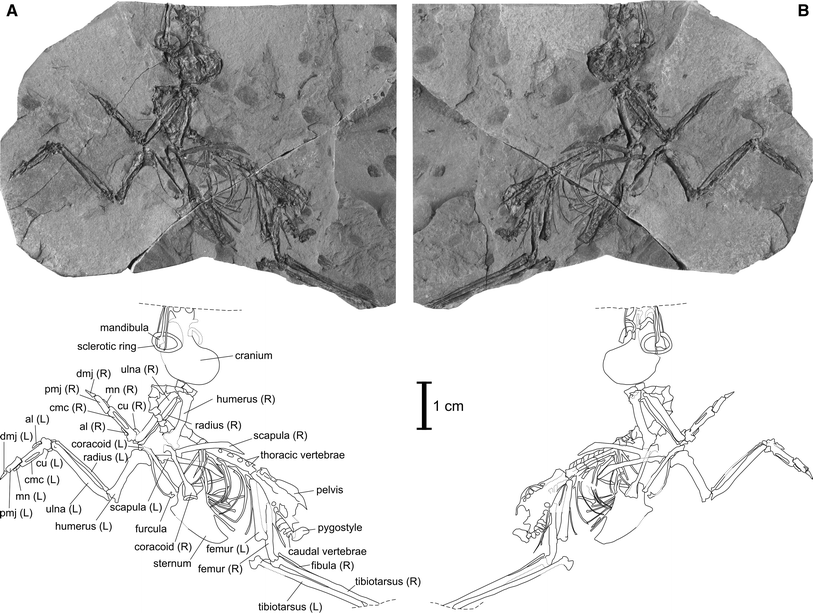
- Holotype

Scientific classification
- Kingdom: Animalia
- Phylum: Chordata
- Class: Aves
- Order: Passeriformes
- Suborder: Passeri
- Genus: †Resoviaornis; Z. M. Bocheński et al., 2013
- Species: †R. jamrozi

Binomial name
- †Resoviaornis jamrozi Z. M. Bocheński et al., 2013

= Resoviaornis =

Resoviaornis Temporal range: Rupelian

Extinct genus of birds

Resoviaornis is an extinct genus of passerine bird from the Early Oligocene (28.5–29 Ma) of southern Poland. Only one species is recorded for the genus, Resoviaornis jamrozi. A 2024 study affirmed it as being an early songbird (suborder Passeri), with potential affinities to either the Passerides or Corvides.
