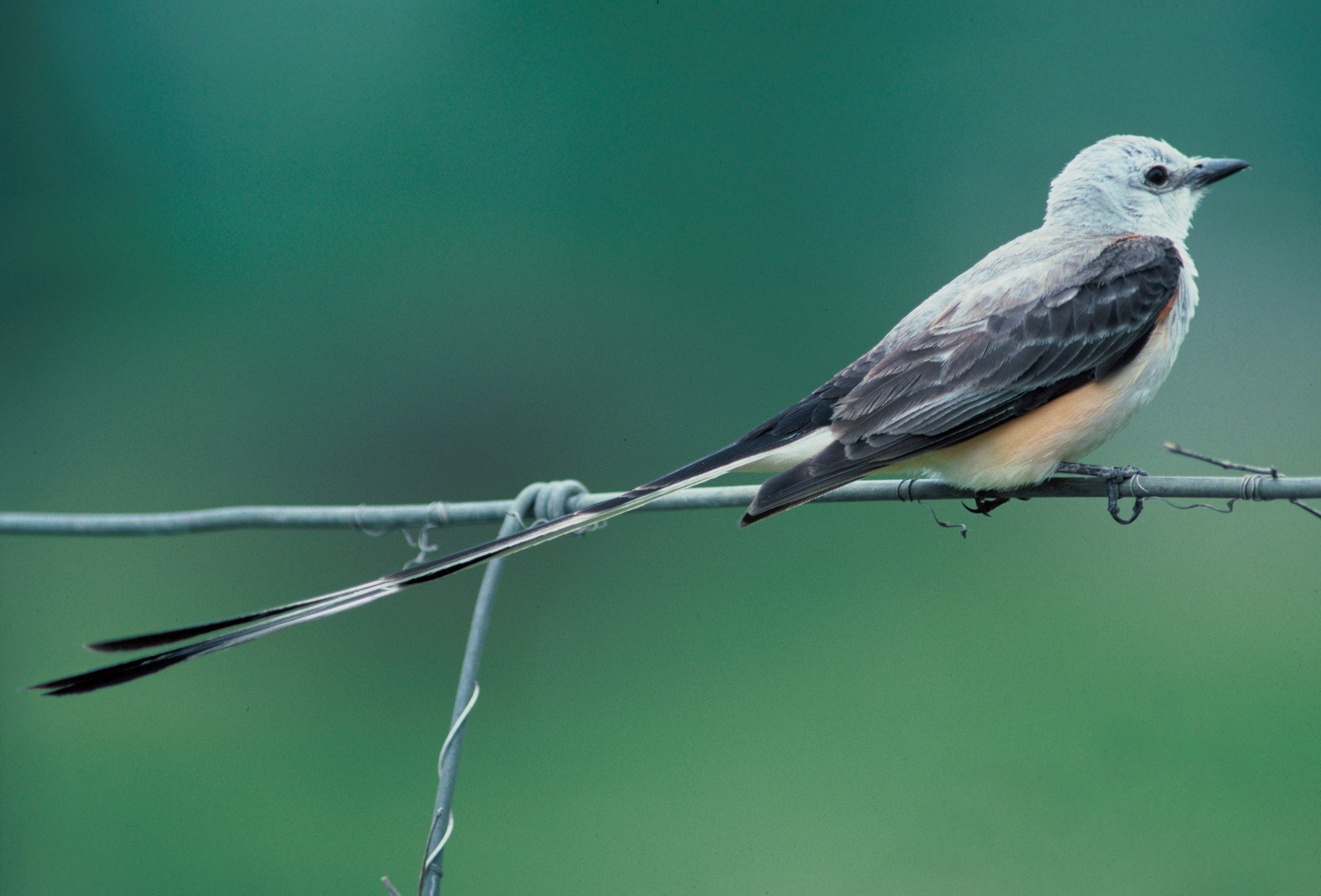
- Scissor-tailed flycatcher (Tyrannus forficatus)

Scientific classification
- Kingdom: Animalia
- Phylum: Chordata
- Class: Aves
- Order: Passeriformes
- Suborder: Tyranni
- Infraorder: Tyrannides
- Parvorder: Tyrannida

Families
- See text

= Tyrannida =

Clade of birds

Tyrannida is a clade of birds in the Passeriformes.

== Systematics ==
Tyrannida contains the following families:

- Pipridae
- Cotingidae
- Tityridae
- Oxyruncidae
- Onychorhynchidae
- Tyrannidae
