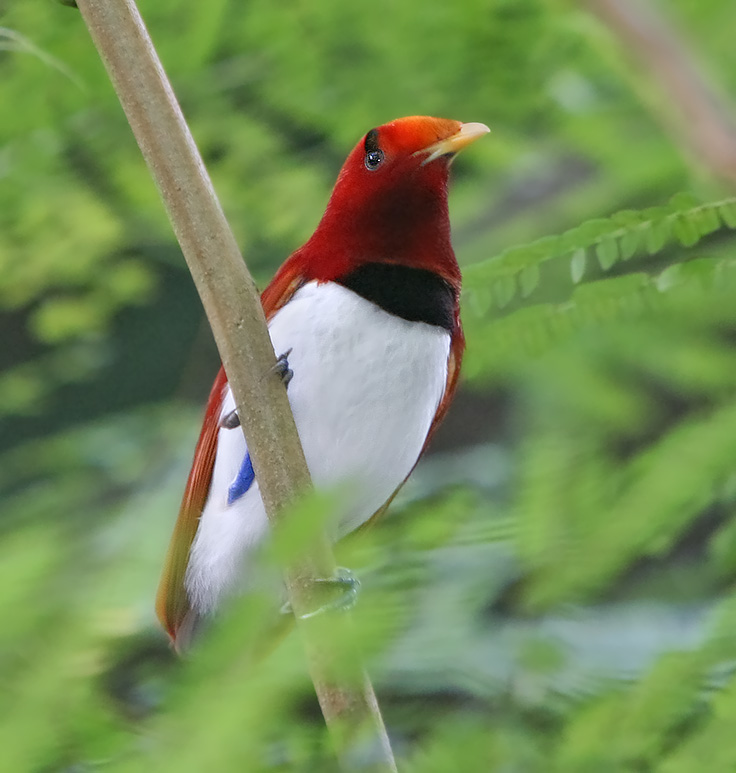
- King bird-of-paradise (Cicinnurus regius)
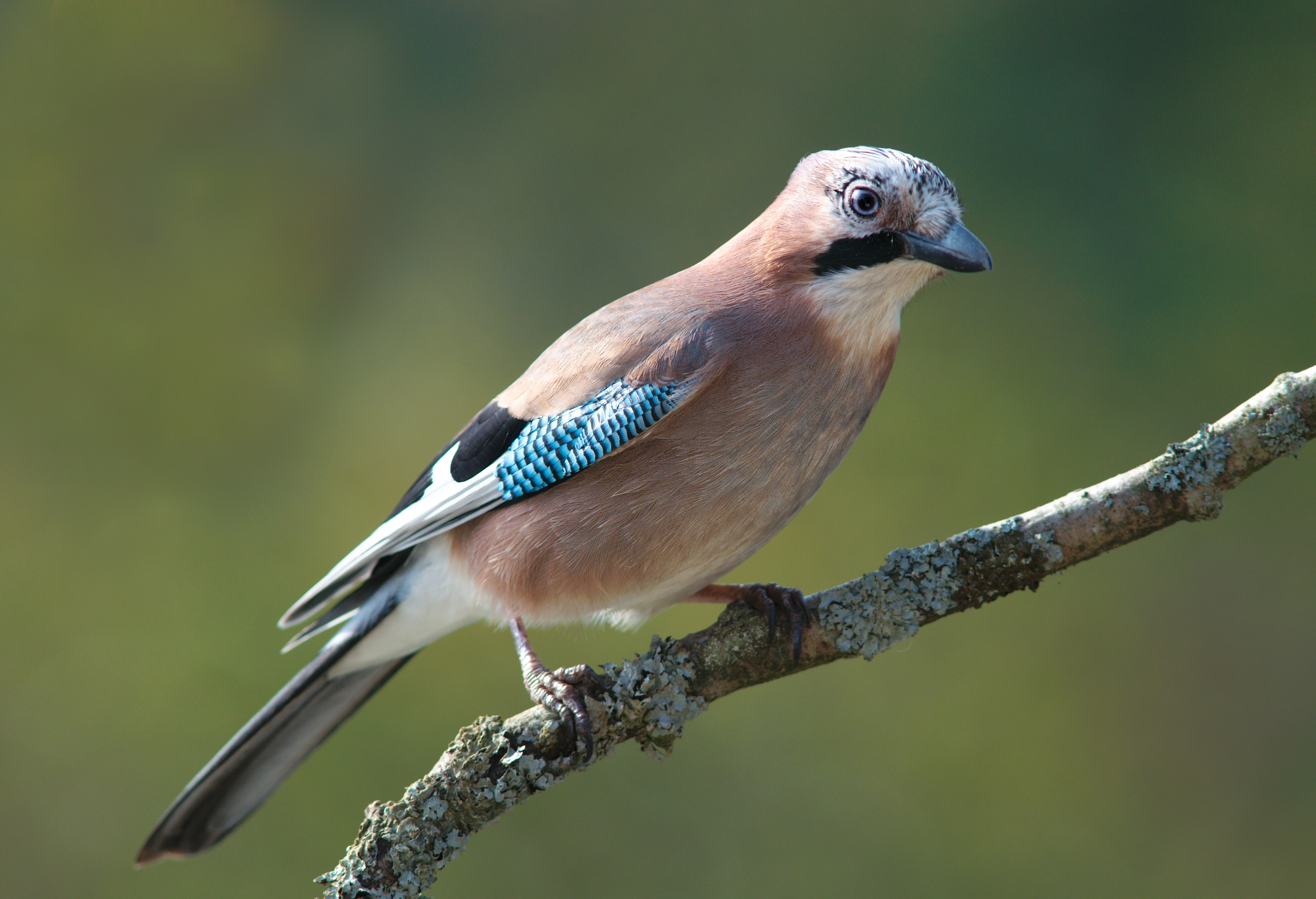
- Eurasian jay (Garrulus glandarius)

Scientific classification
- Kingdom: Animalia
- Phylum: Chordata
- Class: Aves
- Order: Passeriformes
- Suborder: Passeri
- Infraorder: Corvides

Clades
- Cinclosomatidae; Campephagidae; Mohouidae; Neosittidae; Corvoidea; Malaconotoidea; Orioloidea

= Corvides =

Bird clade in the order of Passeriformes

Corvides is an infraorder clade of birds in the order of Passeriformes. Previously referred to as the core Corvoidea, the evolutionary history and biogeography, behavior and eco-morphology of Corvides has been extensively studied. Corvides appear to represent an island radiation, which colonized all continents except Antarctica.

== Systematics ==
Corvides contains the following families:

- Cinclosomatidae
- Campephagidae
- Mohouidae
- Neosittidae
- Superfamily Corvoidea
  - Corcoracidae
  - Corvidae
  - Dicruridae
  - Laniidae
  - Ifritidae
  - Melampittidae
  - Monarchidae
  - Paradisaeidae
  - Platylophidae
  - Rhipiduridae
- Superfamily Malaconotoidea
  - Aegithinidae
  - Artamidae
  - Machaerirhynchidae
  - Malaconotidae
  - Pityriaseidae
  - Platysteiridae
  - Rhagologidae
  - Vangidae (including Prionopidae)
- Superfamily Orioloidea
  - Eulacestomatidae
  - Falcunculidae
  - Oreoicidae
  - Oriolidae
  - Pachycephalidae
  - Paramythiidae
  - Psophodidae
  - Vireonidae
