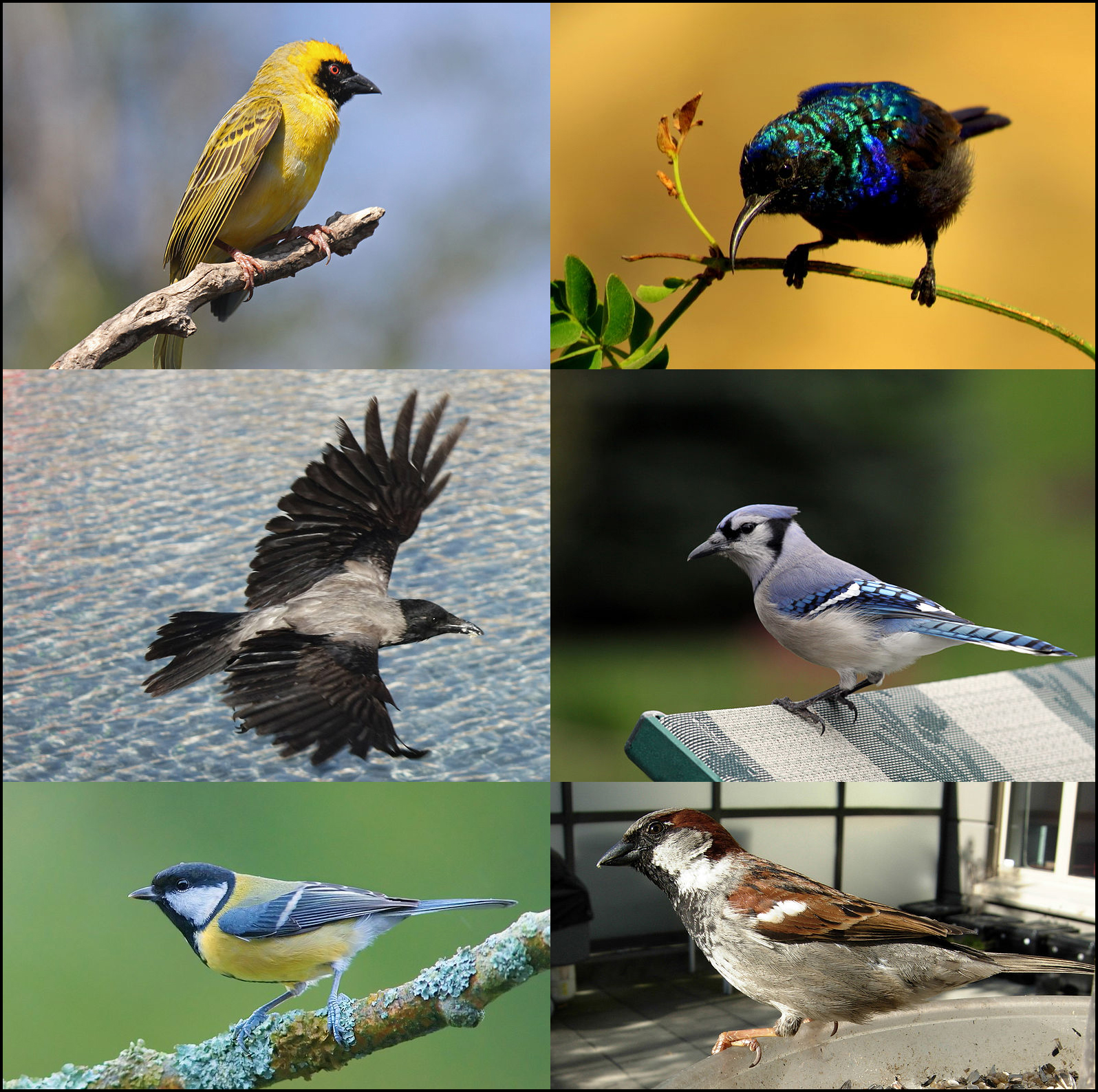
- Clockwise from top right: Palestine sunbird (Cinnyris osea), blue jay (Cyanocitta cristata), house sparrow (Passer domesticus), great tit (Parus major), hooded crow (Corvus cornix), southern masked weaver (Ploceus velatus)

Scientific classification
- Kingdom: Animalia
- Phylum: Chordata
- Class: Aves
- Clade: Psittacopasseres
- Order: Passeriformes; Linnaeus, 1758

Suborders
- Acanthisitti; Eupasseres; Tyranni; Passeri; and see text

Diversity
- Roughly 140 families, 6,500 species

Audio
- Song of a purple-crowned fairywren (Malurus coronatus)

= Passerine =

Passerine Temporal range: Eocene–Recent, 52.5–0 Ma

Perching birds of the order Passeriformes

A passerine (/ˈpæsəraɪn/) is any bird of the order Passeriformes (/ˈpæsərɪfɔːrmiːz/; from Latin passer 'sparrow' and formis '-shaped'). Sometimes known as perching birds, passerines generally have an anisodactyl arrangement of their toes (three pointing forward and one back), which facilitates perching.

With more than 140 families and some 6,500 identified species, Passeriformes is the largest order of birds and one of the most diverse clades of terrestrial vertebrates, representing 60% of birds. Passerines are divided into three suborders: New Zealand wrens; Suboscines, primarily found in North and South America; and songbirds. Passerines originated in the Southern Hemisphere around 60 million years ago.

Most passerines are insectivorous or omnivorous, and eat both fruit or seeds.

== Etymology ==
The terms "passerine" and "Passeriformes" are derived from the scientific name of the house sparrow, Passer domesticus, whose genus is the Latin word for sparrow. Formerly this meant the songbirds of Europe; now it also includes perching, non-singing birds from the Americas.

== Description ==
The order is divided into three primary clades: the suborder Tyranni (non-singing, Americas), the suborder Passeri (songbirds or oscines), and the family Acanthisittidae (New Zealand wrens, sometimes considered to constitute a suborder, Acanthisitti). Modern molecular evidence indicates that the New Zealand wrens are sister to the remaining two clades.

Oscines have the best control of their syrinx muscles among birds, producing a wide range of songs and other vocalizations, though some of them, such as the crows, do not sound musical to human beings. Some, such as the lyrebird, are accomplished mimics. The New Zealand wrens are tiny birds restricted to New Zealand, at least in modern times; they were long placed in Passeri.

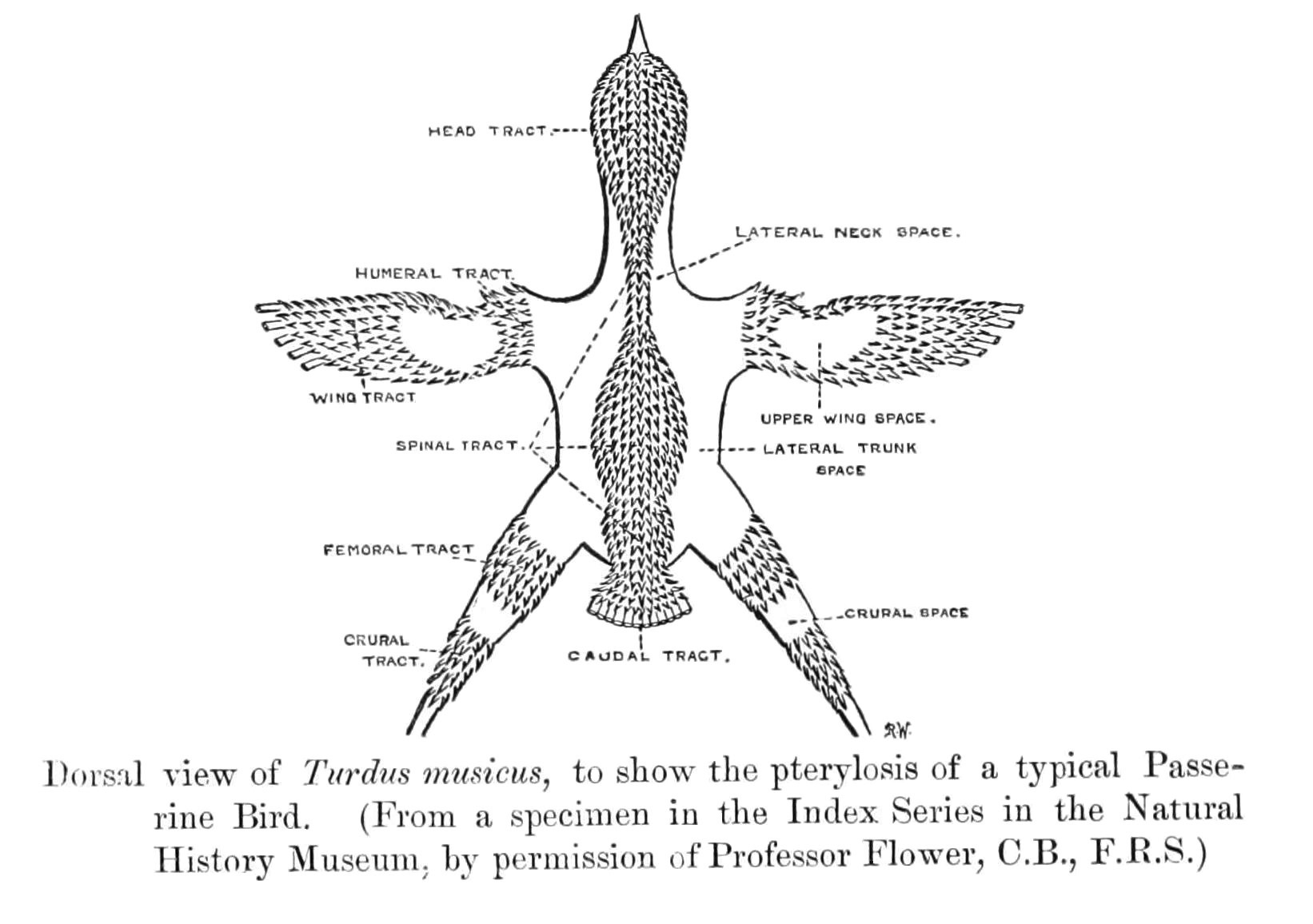
Pterylosis or the feather tracts in a typical passerine

Most passerines are smaller than typical members of other avian orders. The heaviest and altogether largest passerines are the thick-billed raven and the larger races of common raven, each exceeding 1.5 kg (3.3 lb) and 70 cm (28 in). The superb lyrebird and some birds-of-paradise, due to very long tails or tail coverts, are longer overall. The smallest passerine is the short-tailed pygmy tyrant, at 6.5 cm (2.6 in) and 4.2 g (0.15 oz).

== Anatomy ==
The foot of a passerine has three toes directed forward and one toe directed backward, called anisodactyl arrangement. The hind toe (hallux) is long and joins the leg at approximately the same level as the front toes. This arrangement enables passerine birds to easily perch upright on branches. The toes have no webbing or joining, but in some cotingas, the second and third toes are united at their basal third.

The leg of passerine birds contains an additional special adaptation for perching. A tendon in the rear of the leg running from the underside of the toes to the muscle behind the tibiotarsus will automatically be pulled and tighten when the leg bends, causing the foot to curl and become stiff when the bird lands on a branch. This enables passerines to sleep while perching without falling off.

Most passerine birds have 12 tail feathers but the superb lyrebird has 16, and several spinetails in the family Furnariidae have 10, 8, or even 6, as is the case of Des Murs's wiretail. Species adapted to tree trunk climbing such as treecreepers and woodcreeper have stiff tail feathers that are used as props during climbing. Extremely long tails used as sexual ornaments are shown by species in different families. A well-known example is the long-tailed widowbird.

== Eggs and nests ==
The chicks of passerines are altricial: blind, featherless, and helpless when hatched from their eggs. Hence, chicks require extensive parental care. Most passerines lay colored eggs, in contrast with nonpasserines, most of whose eggs are white except in some ground-nesting groups such as Charadriiformes and nightjars, where camouflage is necessary, and in some parasitic cuckoos, which match the passerine host's egg. The vinous-throated parrotbill has two egg colors, white and blue, to deter the brood parasitic common cuckoo.

Clutches vary greatly in size: some larger passerines of Australia such as lyrebirds and scrub-robins lay only a single egg, most smaller passerines in warmer climates lay between two and five, while in the higher latitudes of the Northern Hemisphere, hole-nesting species like tits can lay up to a dozen and other species around five or six. The family Viduidae do not build their own nests, instead, they lay eggs in other birds' nests.

The Passeriformes contain several groups of brood parasites such as the viduas, cuckoo-finches, and the cowbirds.

Bird nest construction is complex and cognitively demanding, and has a very high degree of diversification amongst Passeriformes. A study of brain size and nest construction across a large number of different passerine species indicated that building nests with different attachment modes requires different levels of cognitive abilities.

== Origin and evolution ==
The evolutionary history of the passerine families and the relationships among them remained rather mysterious until the late 20th century. In many cases, passerine families were grouped together on the basis of morphological similarities that, it is now believed, are the result of convergent evolution, not a close genetic relationship. For example, the wrens of the Americas and Eurasia, those of Australia, and those of New Zealand look superficially similar and behave in similar ways, yet belong to three far-flung branches of the passerine family tree; they are as unrelated as it is possible to be while remaining Passeriformes. (Note: The name wren has been applied to other, unrelated birds in Australia and New Zealand. The 27 Australasian "wren" species in the family Maluridae are unrelated, as are the New Zealand wrens in the family Acanthisittidae; the antwrens in the family Thamnophilidae; and the wren-babblers of the families Timaliidae, Pellorneidae, and Pnoepygidae. For the monophyly of the "true wrens", Troglodytidae, see Barker 2004.)

Advances in molecular biology and improved paleobiogeographical data gradually are revealing a clearer picture of passerine origins and evolution that reconciles molecular affinities, the constraints of morphology, and the specifics of the fossil record. The first passerines are now thought to have evolved in the Southern Hemisphere in the late Paleocene or early Eocene, around 50 million years ago.

The initial diversification of passerines coincides with the separation of the southern continents in the early Eocene. The New Zealand wrens are the first to become isolated in Zealandia, and the second split involved the origin of the Tyranni in South America and the Passeri in the Australian continent. The Passeri experienced a great radiation of forms in Australia. A major branch of the Passeri, the parvorder Passerida, dispersed into Eurasia and Africa about 40 million years ago, where they experienced further radiation of new lineages. This eventually led to three major Passerida lineages comprising about 4,000 species, which in addition to the Corvida and numerous minor lineages make up songbird diversity today. Extensive biogeographical mixing happens, with northern forms returning to the south, southern forms moving north, and so on.

=== Fossil record ===
==== Earliest passerines ====
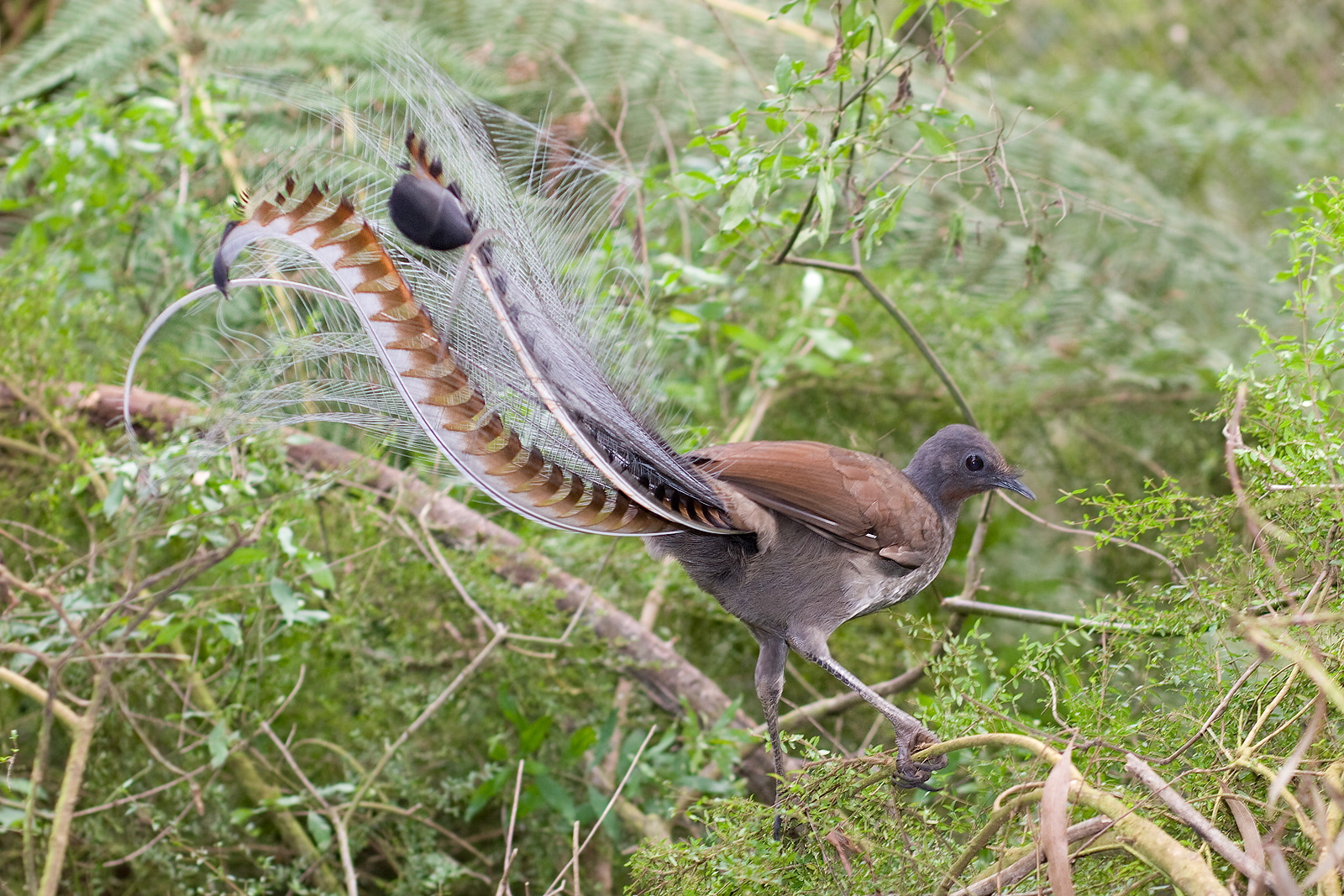
Male superb lyrebird (Menura novaehollandiae): This unique songbird shows strong sexual dimorphism, with a peculiarly apomorphic display of plumage in males.

Perching bird osteology, especially of the limb bones, is rather diagnostic. However, the early fossil record is poor because passerines are relatively small, and their delicate bones do not preserve well. Queensland Museum specimens F20688 (carpometacarpus) and F24685 (tibiotarsus) from Murgon, Queensland, are fossil bone fragments initially assigned to Passeriformes. However, the material is too fragmentary and their affinities have been questioned. Several more recent fossils from the Oligocene of Europe, such as Wieslochia, Jamna, Resoviaornis, and Crosnoornis, are more complete and definitely represent early passeriforms, and have been found to belong to a variety of modern and extinct lineages.

From the Bathans Formation at the Manuherikia River in Otago, New Zealand, MNZ S42815 (a distal right tarsometatarsus of a tui-sized bird) and several bones of at least one species of saddleback-sized bird have recently been described. These date from the Early to Middle Miocene (Awamoan to Lillburnian, 19–16 mya).

==== Early European passerines ====
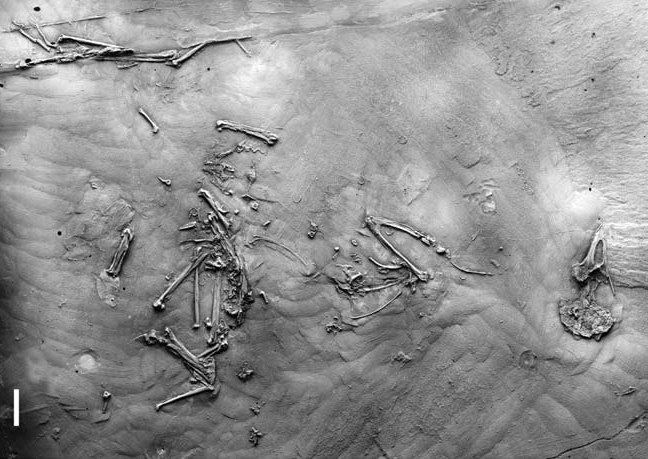
Wieslochia fossil

In Europe, perching birds are not too uncommon in the fossil record from the Oligocene onward, belonging to several lineages:

- Wieslochia (Early Oligocene of Frauenweiler, Germany) – suboscine
- Resoviaornis (Early Oligocene of Wola Rafałowska, Poland) – oscine
- Jamna (Early Oligocene of Jamna Dolna, Poland) – basal
- Winnicavis (Early Oligocene of Lower Silesian Voivodeship, Poland)
- Crosnoornis (Early Oligocene of Poland) - suboscine
- Passeriformes gen. et sp. indet. (Early Oligocene of Luberon, France) – suboscine or basal (Note: Specimen SMF Av 504. A flattened right hand of a passerine perhaps 10 cm long overall. If suboscine, perhaps closer to Cotingidae than to Eurylaimides.)
- Passeriformes gen. et spp. indet. (Late Oligocene of France) – several suboscine and oscine taxa
- Passeriformes gen. et spp. indet. (Middle Miocene of France and Germany) – basal? (Note: Specimens SMF Av 487–496; SMNS 86822, 86825-86826; MNHN SA 1259–1263: tibiotarsus remains of small, possibly basal Passeriformes.)
- Passeriformes gen. et spp. indet. (Sajóvölgyi Middle Miocene of Mátraszőlős, Hungary) – at least 2 taxa, possibly 3; at least one probably Oscines. (Note: A partial coracoid of a probable Muscicapoidea, possibly Turdidae; distal tibiotarsus and tarsometatarsus of a smallish to mid-sized passerine that may be the same as the preceding; proximal ulna and tarsometatarsus of a Paridae-sized passerine.)
- Passeriformes gen. et sp. indet. (Middle Miocene of Felsőtárkány, Hungary) – oscine? (Note: A humerus diaphysis piece of a swallow-sized passerine.)
- Passeriformes gen. et sp. indet. (Late Miocene of Polgárdi, Hungary) – Sylvioidea (Sylviidae? Cettiidae?)

That suboscines expanded much beyond their region of origin is proven by several fossils from Germany such as a presumed broadbill (Eurylaimidae) humerus fragment from the Early Miocene (roughly 20 mya) of Wintershof, Germany, the Late Oligocene carpometacarpus from France listed above, and Wieslochia, among others. Extant Passeri super-families were quite distinct by that time and are known since about 12–13 mya when modern genera were present in the corvoidean and basal songbirds. The modern diversity of Passerida genera is known mostly from the Late Miocene onward and into the Pliocene (about 10–2 mya). Pleistocene and early Holocene lagerstätten (<1.8 mya) yield numerous extant species, and many yield almost nothing but extant species or their chronospecies and paleosubspecies.

==== American fossils ====
In the Americas, the fossil record is more scant before the Pleistocene, from which several still-existing families are documented. Apart from the indeterminable MACN-SC-1411 (Pinturas Early/Middle Miocene of Santa Cruz Province, Argentina), (Note: Distal right humerus, possibly suboscine.) an extinct lineage of perching birds has been described from the Late Miocene of California, United States: the Palaeoscinidae with the single genus Palaeoscinis. "Palaeostruthus" eurius (Pliocene of Florida) probably belongs to an extant family, most likely passeroidean.

== Systematics and taxonomy ==
- - Acanthisitti – New Zealand wrens (1 family containing 7 species, only 2 extant)
  - - Tyranni – suboscines (16 families containing 1,356 species)
    - Passeri – oscines (125 families containing 5,158 species)

Phylogenetic relationship of the suborders within the Passeriformes. The numbers are from the list published by the International Ornithologists' Union in January 2020.

The Passeriformes is currently divided into three suborders: Acanthisitti (New Zealand wrens), Tyranni, (suboscines) and Passeri (oscines or songbirds). The Passeri is now subdivided into two major groups recognized now as Corvides and Passerida respectively containing the large superfamilies Corvoidea and Meliphagoidea, as well as minor lineages, and the superfamilies Sylvioidea, Muscicapoidea, and Passeroidea but this arrangement has been found to be oversimplified. Since the mid-2000s, studies have investigated the phylogeny of the Passeriformes and found that many families from Australasia traditionally included in the Corvoidea actually represent more basal lineages within oscines. Likewise, the traditional three-superfamily arrangement within the Passeri has turned out to be far more complex and will require changes in classification.

Major "wastebin" families such as the Old World warblers and Old World babblers have turned out to be paraphyletic and are being rearranged. Several taxa turned out to represent highly distinct lineages, so new families had to be established, some of these – like the stitchbird of New Zealand and the Eurasian bearded reedling – monotypic with only one living species. In the Passeri alone, a number of minor lineages will eventually be recognized as distinct superfamilies. For example, the kinglets constitute a single genus with less than 10 species today but seem to have been among the first perching bird lineages to diverge as the group spread across Eurasia. No particularly close relatives of theirs have been found among comprehensive studies of the living Passeri, though they might be fairly close to some little-studied tropical Asian groups. Nuthatches, wrens, and their closest relatives are currently grouped in a distinct super-family Certhioidea.

== Taxonomic list of Passeriformes families ==
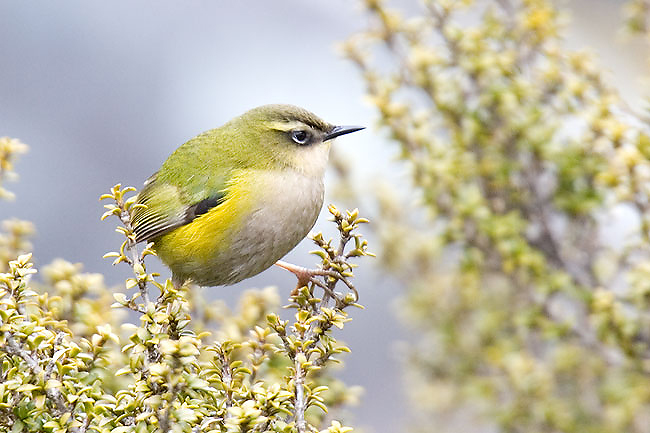
New Zealand rock wren (Xenicus gilviventris), one of the two surviving species of suborder Acanthisitti

This list is in taxonomic order, placing related families next to one another. The families listed are those recognised by the International Ornithologists' Union (IOC). The order and the division into infraorders, parvorders, and superfamilies follows the phylogenetic analysis published by Carl Oliveros and colleagues in 2019. (Note: Oliveros et al (2019) use the list of families published by Dickinson and Christidis in 2014. Oliveros et al include 8 families that are not included on the IOC list. These are not shown here. By contrast, the IOC list includes 15 families that are not present in Dickinson and Christidis. In 13 of these cases, the position of the additional family in the taxonomic order can be determined from the species included by Oliveros and colleagues in their analysis. No species in the families Alcippeidae and Teretistridae were sampled by Oliveros et al so their position is uncertain.) The relationships between the families in the suborder Tyranni (suboscines) were all well determined but some of the nodes in Passeri (oscines or songbirds) were unclear owing to the rapid splitting of the lineages.

=== Suborder Acanthisitti ===
- Acanthisittidae: New Zealand wrens

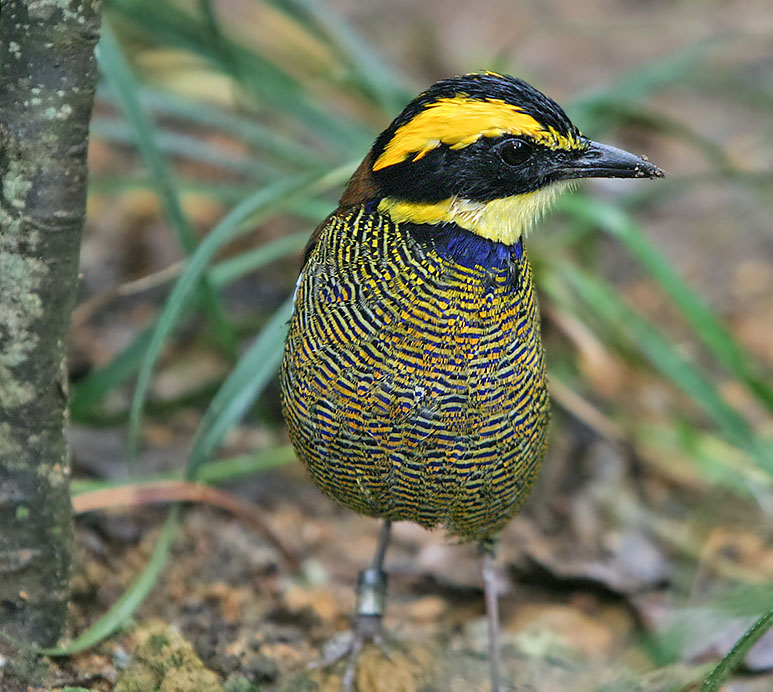
Javan banded pitta (Hydrornis guajanus), an Old World suboscine.

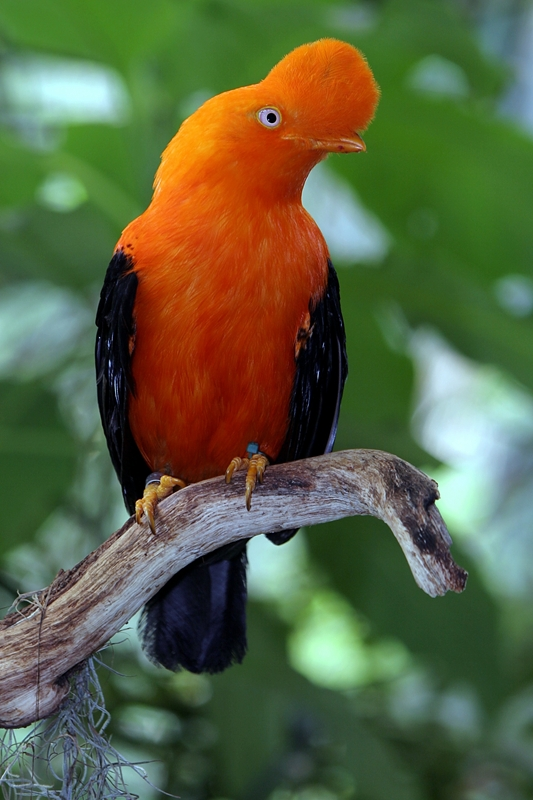
Andean cock-of-the-rock (Rupicola peruvianus) a New World suboscine

=== Suborder Tyranni (suboscines) ===
- Infraorder Eurylaimides: Old World suboscines and sapayoa

- Philepittidae: asities
- Eurylaimidae: typical broadbills
- Calyptomenidae: African and green broadbills
- Sapayoidae: sapayoa
- Pittidae: pittas

- Infraorder Tyrannides: New World suboscines

- Parvorder Furnariida

- Melanopareiidae: crescentchests
- Conopophagidae: gnateaters and gnatpittas
- Thamnophilidae: antbirds
- Grallariidae: antpittas
- Rhinocryptidae: typical tapaculos
- Formicariidae: antthrushes
- Furnariidae: ovenbirds and woodcreepers

- Parvorder Tyrannida

- Pipridae: manakins
- Cotingidae: cotingas
- Tityridae: tityras, becards and allies
- Oxyruncidae: sharpbill
- Onychorhynchidae: royal flycatchers and allies
- Tyrannidae: tyrant flycatchers

=== Suborder Passeri (oscines or songbirds) ===
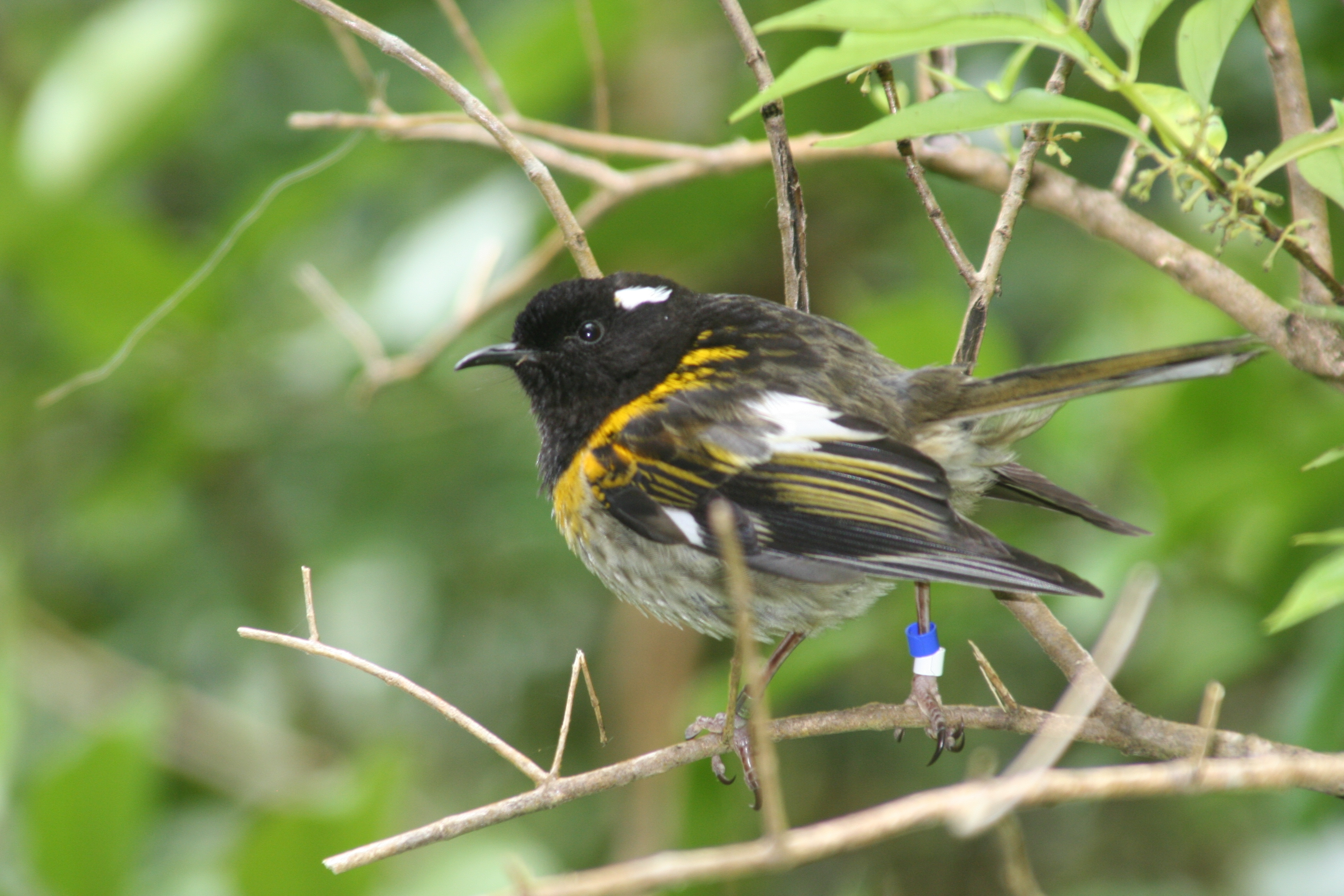
Male stitchbird or hihi (Notiomystis cincta) showing convergence with honeyeaters

- Infraorder Menurides

- Atrichornithidae: scrub-birds
- Menuridae: lyrebirds

- Infraorder Climacterides

- Climacteridae: Australian treecreepers
- Ptilonorhynchidae: bowerbirds

- Infraorder Orthonynchides

- Pomatostomidae: pseudo-babblers
- Orthonychidae: logrunners

- Infraorder Meliphagides

- Superfamily Meliphagoidea

- Acanthizidae: scrubwrens, thornbills, and gerygones
- Meliphagidae: honeyeaters
- Maluridae: australasian wrens
- Dasyornithidae: bristlebirds
- Pardalotidae: pardalotes

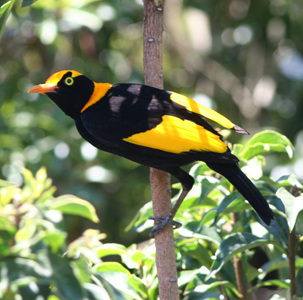
Male regent bowerbird (Sericulus chrysocephalus, Ptilonorhynchidae)

- Infraorder Corvides – previously known as the parvorder Corvida

- No superfamily

- Cinclosomatidae: jewel-babblers, quail-thrushes
- Campephagidae: cuckooshrikes and trillers
- Mohouidae: whiteheads
- Neosittidae: sittellas

- Superfamily Orioloidea (Note: The order of the families within the superfamily Orioloidea is uncertain.)

- Psophodidae: whipbirds
- Eulacestomatidae: wattled ploughbill
- Falcunculidae: shriketits
- Oreoicidae: Australo-Papuan bellbirds
- Paramythiidae: painted berrypeckers
- Vireonidae: vireos, shrike-babblers, and erpornis
- Pachycephalidae: whistlers
- Oriolidae: Old World orioles and figbirds

- Superfamily Malaconotoidea (Note: The order of the families within the superfamily Malaconotoidea is uncertain.)

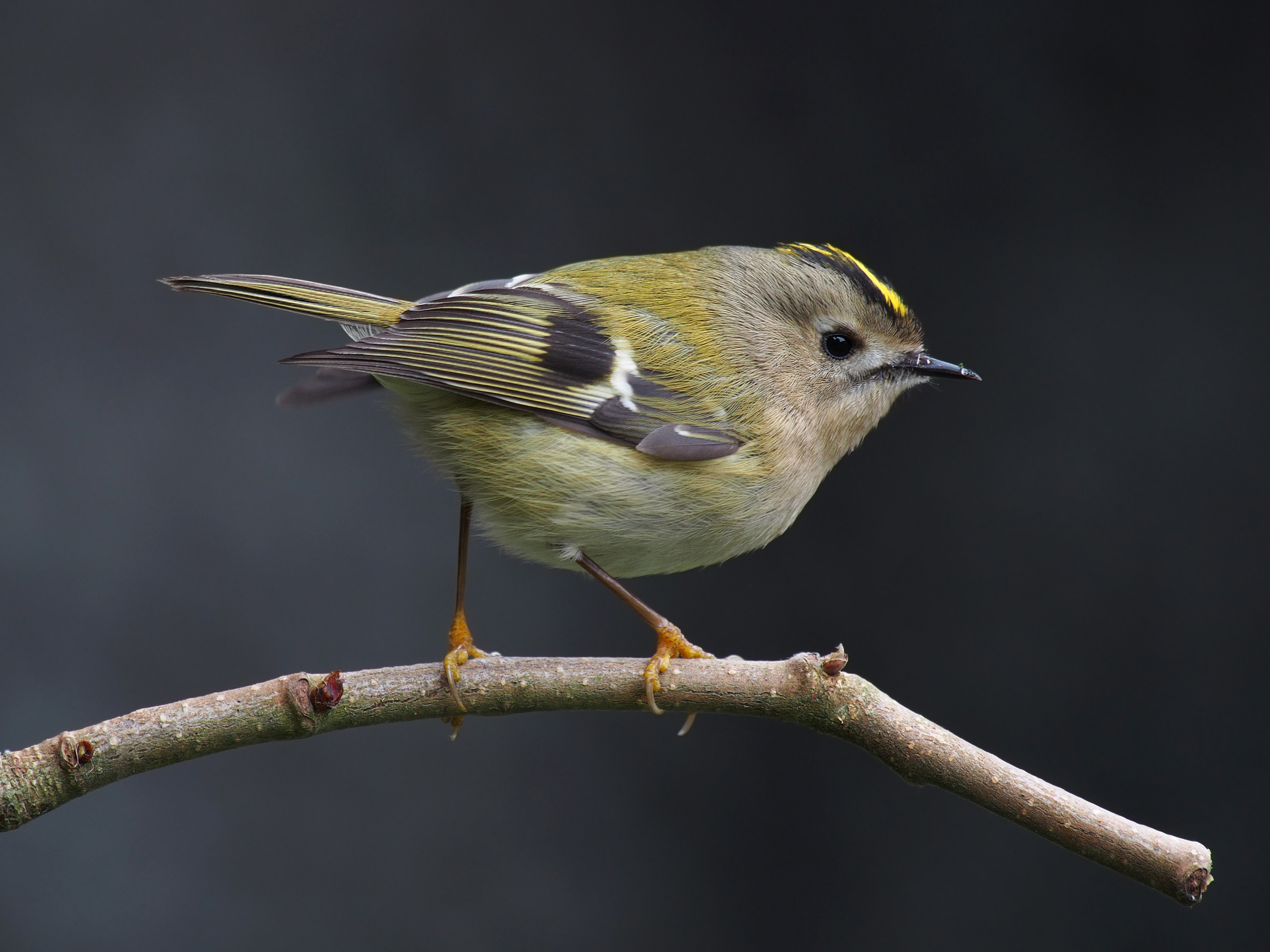
Tiny goldcrest (Regulus regulus) belongs to a minor but highly distinct lineage of Passeri

- Machaerirhynchidae: boatbills
- Artamidae: woodswallows, butcherbirds, currawongs, and Australian magpie
- Rhagologidae: mottled berryhunter
- Malaconotidae: puffbacks, bushshrikes, tchagras, and boubous
- Pityriaseidae: Bornean bristlehead
- Aegithinidae: ioras
- Platysteiridae: wattle-eyes and batises
- Vangidae: vangas, helmetshrikes, and woodshrikes

- Superfamily Corvoidea (Note: The order of the families within the superfamily Corvoidea is uncertain.)

- Rhipiduridae: fantails
- Dicruridae: drongos
- Monarchidae: monarch flycatchers
- Ifritidae: blue-capped ifrit
- Paradisaeidae: birds-of-paradise
- Corcoracidae: white-winged chough and apostlebird
- Melampittidae: melampittas
- Laniidae: shrikes
- Platylophidae: crested jayshrike
- Corvidae: crows, ravens, and jays

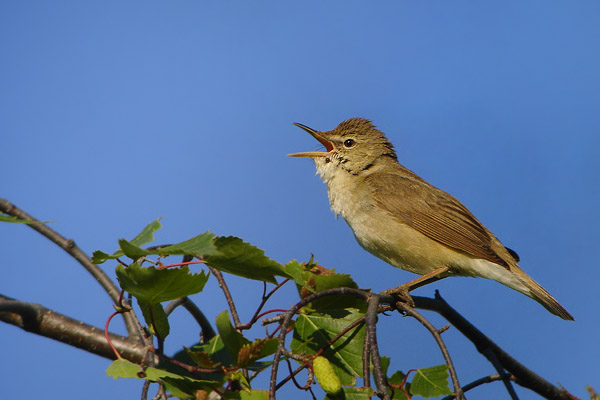
Reed warblers, such as this Blyth's reed warbler (Acrocephalus dumetorum), are now in the Acrocephalidae

- Infraorder Passerides – previously known as the parvorder Passerida

- No parvorder

- Cnemophilidae: satinbirds
- Melanocharitidae: berrypeckers and longbills
- Callaeidae: New Zealand wattlebirds
- Notiomystidae: stitchbird
- Petroicidae: Australasian robins
- Eupetidae: rail-babbler
- Picathartidae: rockfowl
- Chaetopidae: rock-jumpers

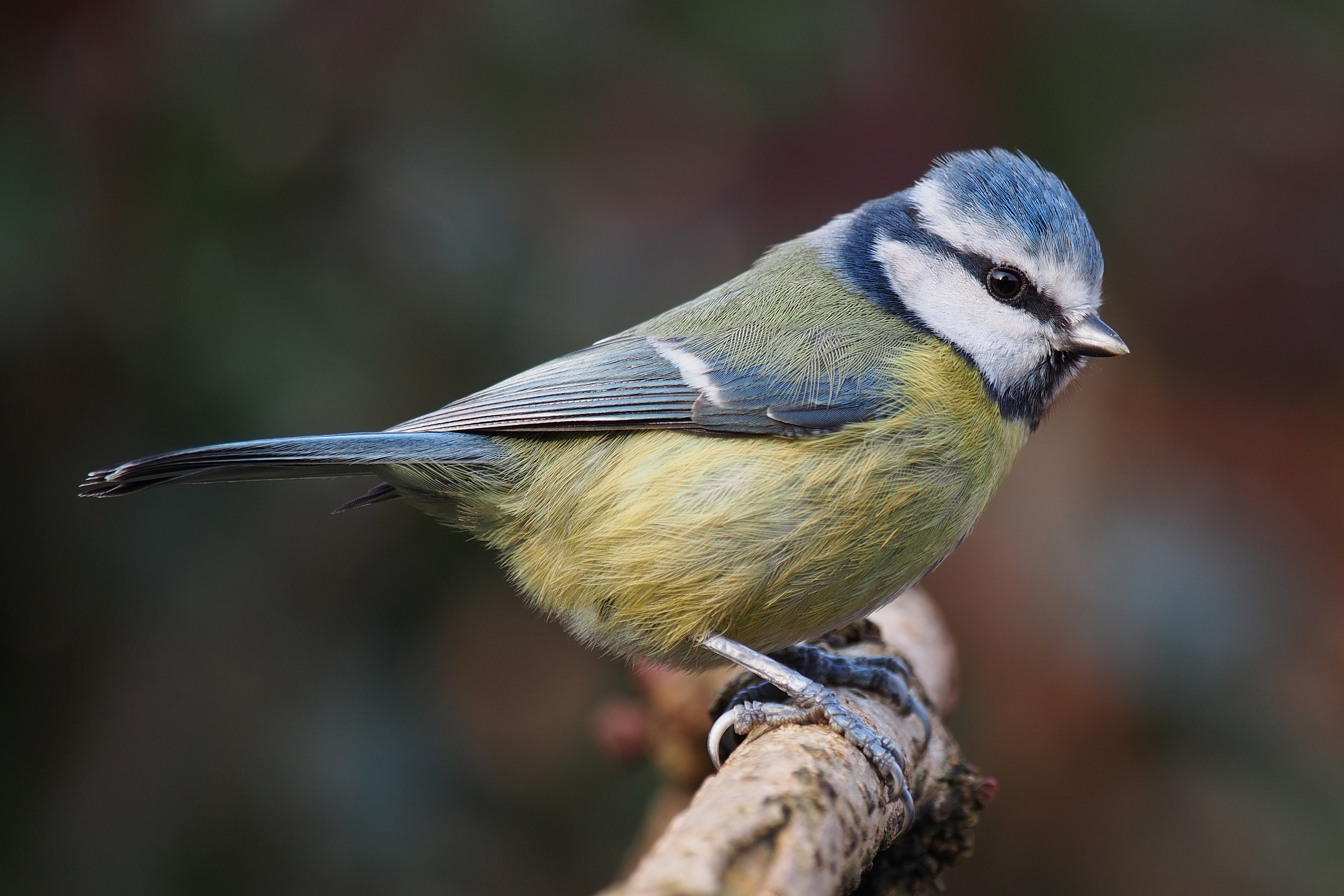
Eurasian blue tit (Cyanistes caeruleus) and its relatives stand well apart from the rest of the Sylvioidea sensu lato

- Parvorder Sylviida (Note: The taxonomic sequence of the superfamilies Locustelloidea, Sylvioidea and Aegithaloidea is uncertain, although the order of the families within each of the superfamilies is well determined.) – previously known as the superfamily Sylvioidea

- Hyliotidae: hyliotas
- Stenostiridae: fairy flycatchers
- Paridae: tits, chickadees and titmice
- Remizidae: penduline-tits
- Panuridae: bearded reedling
- Alaudidae: larks
- Nicatoridae: nicators
- Macrosphenidae: crombecs and African warblers
- Cisticolidae: cisticolas and allies

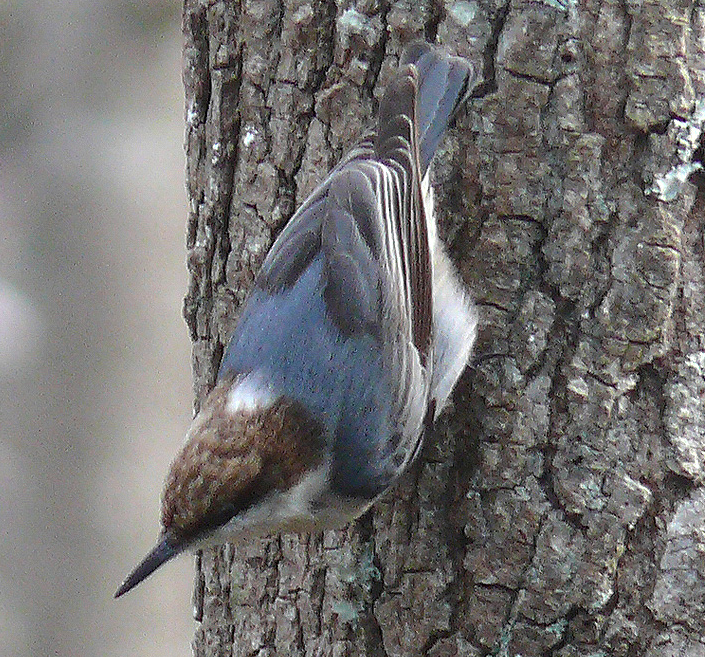
Brown-headed nuthatch (Sitta pusilla), nuthatches can climb downwards head-first

- Superfamily Locustelloidea

- Acrocephalidae: reed warblers, Grauer's warbler and allies
- Locustellidae: grassbirds and allies
- Donacobiidae: black-capped donacobius
- Bernieridae: Malagasy warblers

- Superfamily Hirundinoidea

- Pnoepygidae: cupwings
- Hirundinidae: swallows and martins

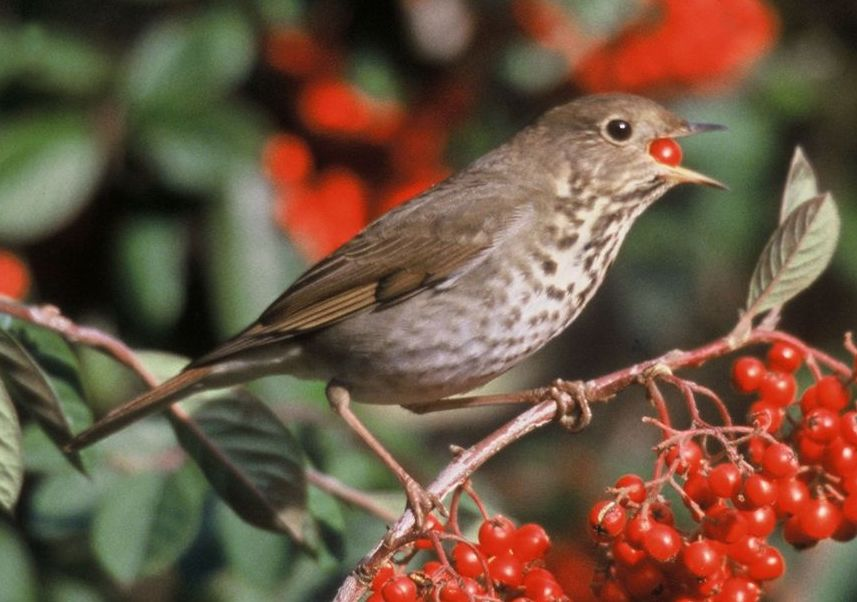
Hermit thrush (Catharus guttatus), like many Muscicapoidea a stout and cryptic bird with complex vocalizations.

- Superfamily Sylvioidea

- Pycnonotidae: bulbuls
- Sylviidae: sylviid warblers
- Paradoxornithidae: parrotbills, fulvettas, wrentit, and myzornis
- Zosteropidae: white-eyes and yuhinas
- Timaliidae: tree babblers
- Leiothrichidae: laughingthrushes and allies
- Pellorneidae: ground babblers

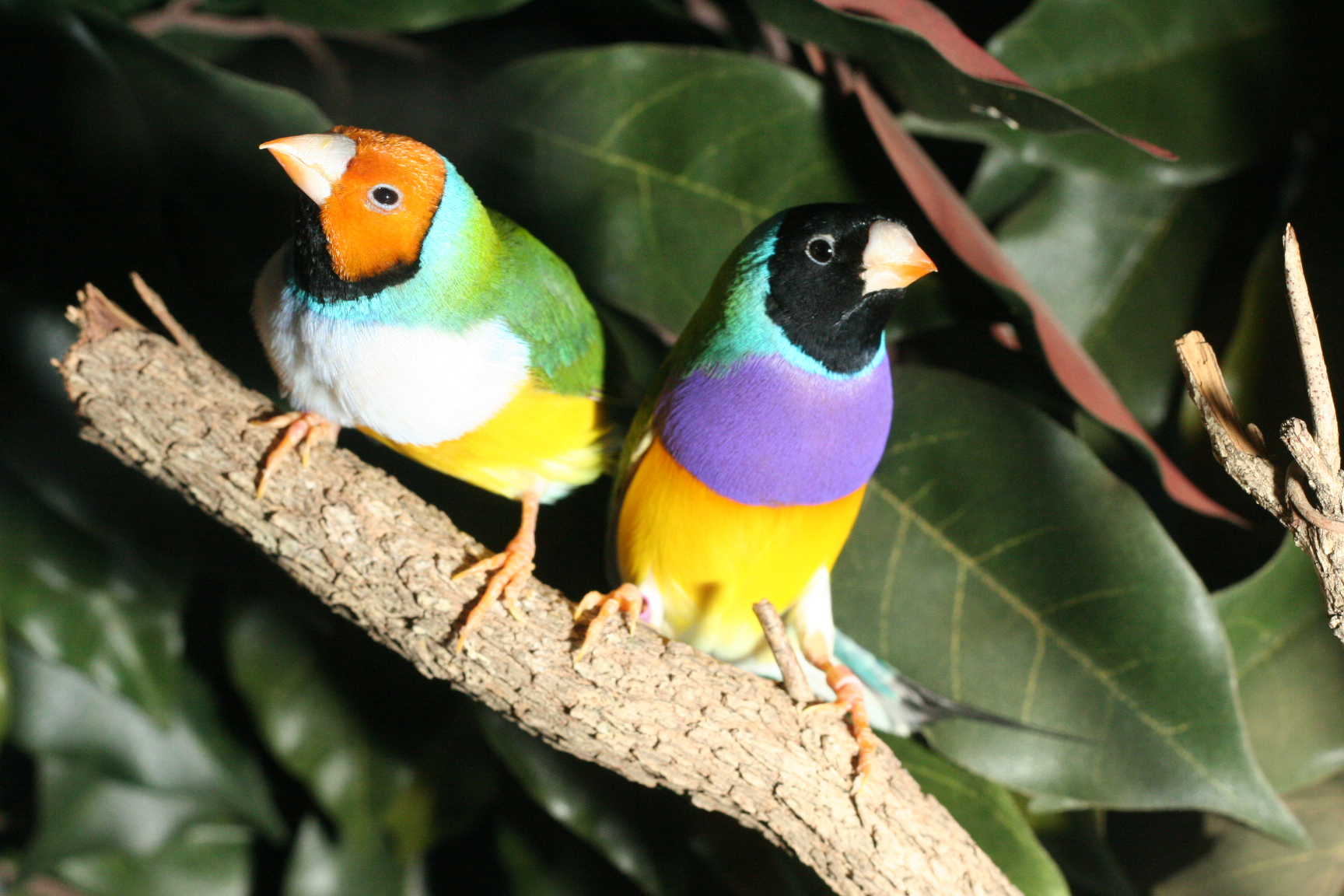
Like these male (right) and female Gouldian finches (Erythrura gouldiae), many Passeroidea are very colorful

- Superfamily Aegithaloidea

- Phylloscopidae: leaf-warblers and allies
- Hyliidae: hylias
- Aegithalidae: long-tailed tits or bushtits
- Cettiidae: Cettia bush warblers and allies
- Erythrocercidae: yellow flycatchers

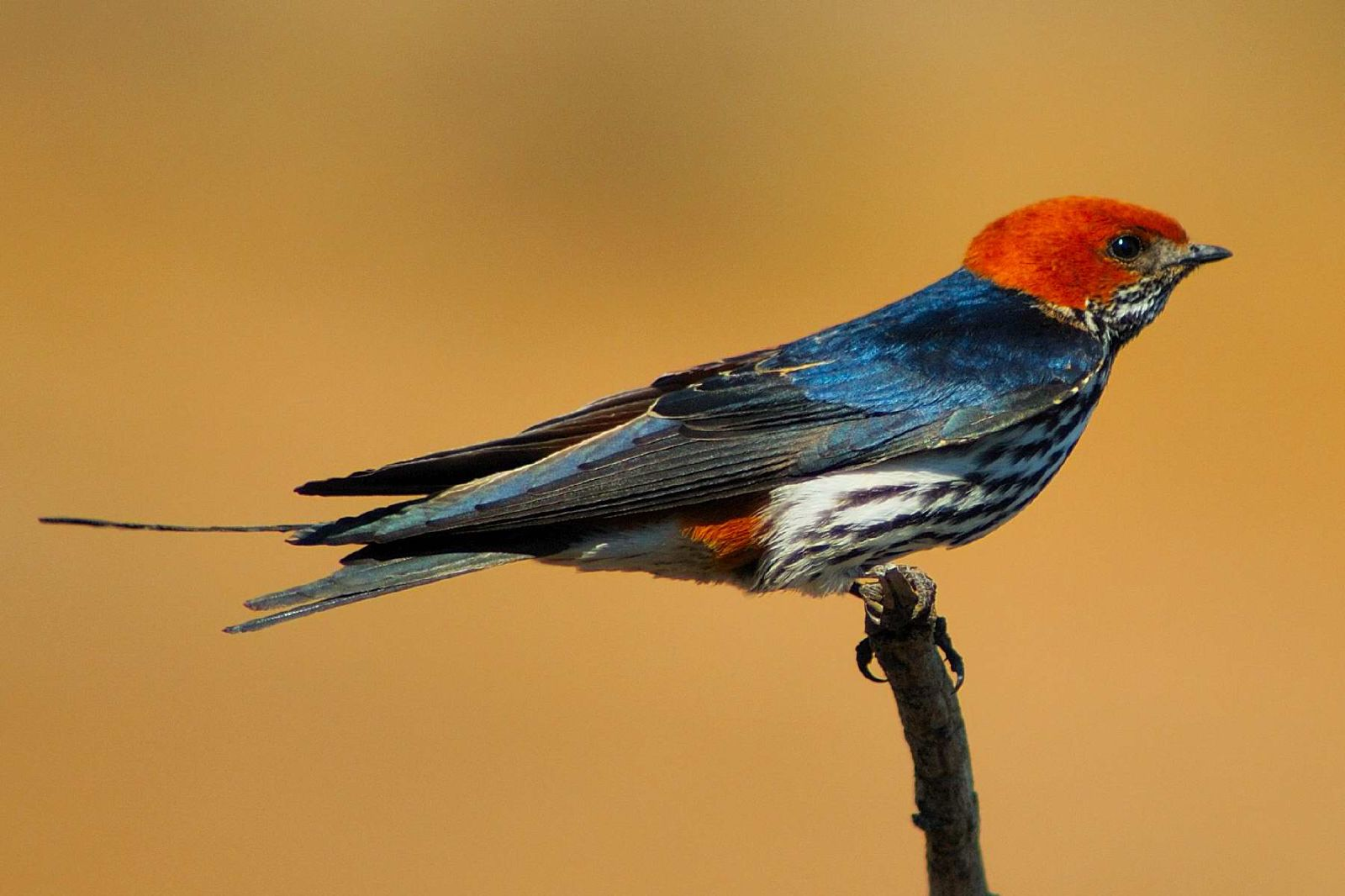
Lesser striped swallow (Cecropis abyssinica), showing some apomorphies of its ancient yet highly advanced lineage.

- Parvorder Muscicapida – previously treated as superfamily Muscicapoidea

- Superfamily Bombycilloidea

- Dulidae: palmchat
- Bombycillidae: waxwings
- Ptiliogonatidae: silky flycatchers
- Hylocitreidae: hylocitrea
- Hypocoliidae: hypocolius
- †Mohoidae: Hawaiian honeyeaters

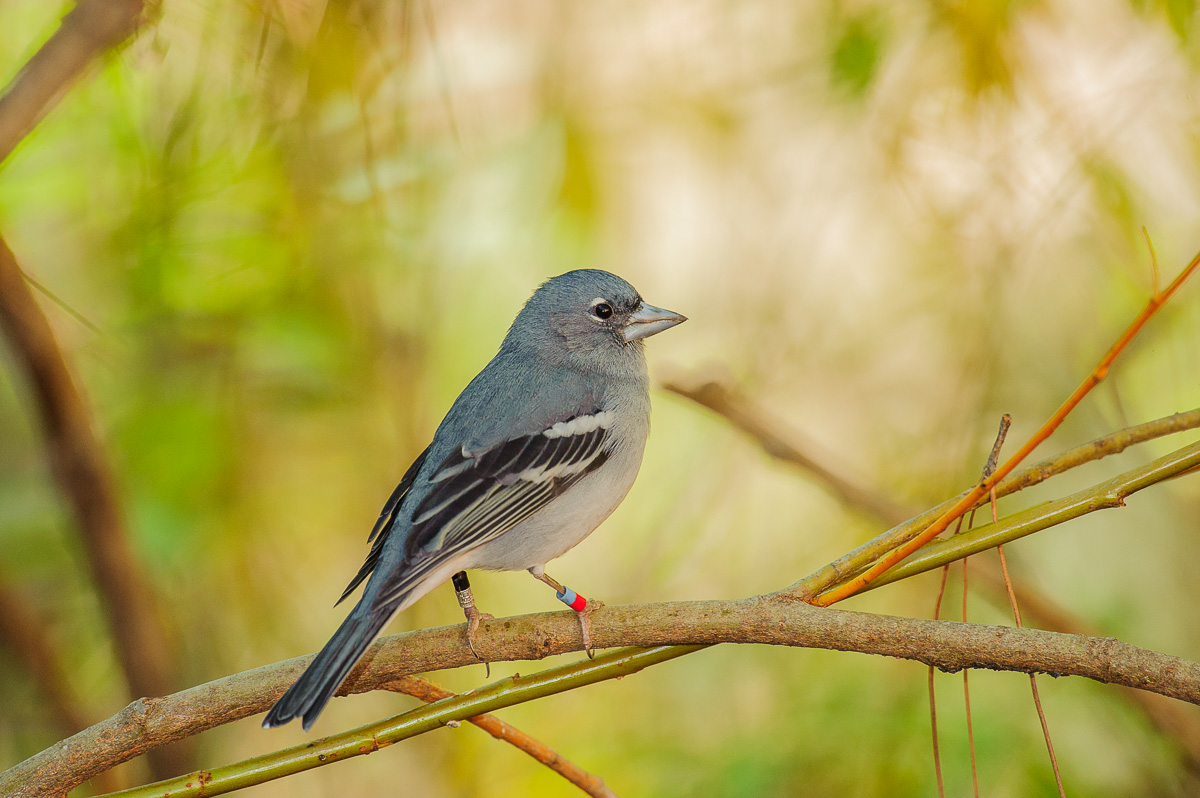
Gran Canaria blue chaffinch (male)

- Superfamily Muscicapoidea

- Elachuridae: spotted elachura
- Cinclidae: dippers
- Muscicapidae: Old World flycatchers and chats
- Turdidae: thrushes and allies
- Buphagidae: oxpeckers
- Sturnidae: starlings, mynas, and rhabdornis
- Mimidae: mockingbirds and thrashers

- Superfamily Reguloidea

- Regulidae: goldcrests and kinglets

- Superfamily Certhioidea

- Tichodromidae: wallcreeper
- Sittidae: nuthatches
- Certhiidae: treecreepers
- Salpornithidae: spotted creepers
- Polioptilidae: gnatcatchers
- Troglodytidae: wrens

- Parvorder Passerida – previously known as the superfamily Passeroidea

- No superfamily

- Promeropidae: sugarbirds
- Modulatricidae: dapple-throat and allies
- Nectariniidae: sunbirds
- Dicaeidae: flowerpeckers
- Chloropseidae: leafbirds
- Irenidae: fairy-bluebirds
- Peucedramidae: olive warbler
- Urocynchramidae: Przewalski's finch

- Superfamily Ploceoidea

- Ploceidae: weavers
- Viduidae: indigobirds and whydahs
- Estrildidae: waxbills, munias and allies

- Superfamily Passeroidea

- Prunellidae: accentors
- Passeridae: Old World sparrows, snowfinches, and ibon
- Motacillidae: wagtails and pipits

- Superfamily Fringilloidea – previously known as the nine-primaried oscines (Note: The order of some of the families within the superfamily Fringilloidea is uncertain.)

- Fringillidae: finches and euphonias
- Rhodinocichlidae: rosy thrush-tanager
- Calcariidae: longspurs and snow buntings
- Emberizidae: buntings
- Cardinalidae: cardinals
- Mitrospingidae: mitrospingid tanagers
- Thraupidae: tanagers and allies
- Passerellidae: New World sparrows, bush tanagers
- Parulidae: New World warblers
- Icteriidae: yellow-breasted chat
- Icteridae: grackles, New World blackbirds, and New World orioles
- Calyptophilidae: chat-tanagers
- Zeledoniidae: wrenthrush
- Teretistridae: Cuban warblers (Note: The family Teretistridae (Cuban warblers) is tentatively placed here. The family was not included in the analysis published by Oliveros et al (2019). Dickinson and Christidis (2014) considered the genus Teretistris Incertae sedis. Barker et al (2013) found that Teretistridae is closely related to Zeledoniidae.)
- Nesospingidae: Puerto Rican tanager
- Spindalidae: spindalises
- Phaenicophilidae: Hispaniolan tanagers

=== Phylogeny ===
Relationships between living Passeriformes families based on the phylogenetic analysis of Oliveros et al. (2019). Some terminals have been renamed to reflect families recognised by the IOC but not in that study. The IOC families Alcippeidae and Teretistridae were not sampled in this study.

- Passeriformes
  - - Acanthisitti
      Acanthisittidae (New Zealand wrens)
  - Eupasseres
    - Tyranni
      - Eurylaimides
        - - Eurylaimidae (eurylaimid broadbills)
          - Philepittidae (asites)
        - - Calyptomenidae (African and green broadbills)
          - - Pittidae (pittas)
            - Sapayoidae (sapayoa)
      - Tyrannides
        - Furnariida
          - - Melanopareiidae (crescent chests)
            - - Conopophagidae (gnateaters)
              - Thamnophilidae (antbirds)
          - - Grallariidae (antpittas)
            - - Rhinocryptidae (tapaculos)
              - - Formicariidae (antthrushes)
                - - Scleruridae (leaftossers)
                  - - Dendrocolaptidae (woodcreepers)
                    - Furnariidae (ovenbirds)
        - Tyrannida
          - Pipridae (manakins)
          - - Cotingidae (cotingas)
            - - Tityridae (tityras, becards)
              - - - Onychorhynchidae (royal flycatchers & allies)
                  - Oxyruncidae (sharpbill)
                - - Pipritidae (piprites)
                  - - - Platyrinchidae (spadebills)
                      - - Tachurididae (many-coloured rush tyrant)
                        - - Rhynchocyclidae (mionectine flycatchers)
                          - Tyrannidae (tyrant flycatchers)
    - Passeri
      - - Menurides
          - Menuridae (lyrebirds)
          - Atrichornithidae (scrubbirds)
      - - - Climacterides
            - Climacteridae (Australian treecreepers)
            - Ptilonorhynchidae (bowerbirds)
        - - - Meliphagoidea
              - Maluridae (Australasian wrens)
              - - Dasyornithidae (bristlebirds)
                - - Meliphagidae (honeyeaters)
                  - - Acanthizidae (Australasian warblers)
                    - Pardalotidae (pardalotes)
          - - - Orthonychides
                - Orthonychidae (logrunners)
                - Pomatostomidae (Australasian babblers)
            - - Corvides
                - Cinclosomatidae (quail-thrushes, jewel-babblers)
                - - Campephagidae (cuckooshrikes)
                  - - - Mohouidae (whitehead)
                      - Neosittidae (sittellas)
                    - - - Orioloidea
                          - Psophodidae (whipbirds & allies)
                          - - Eulacestomidae (ploughbill)
                            - - - Falcunculidae (shriketits)
                                - Oreoicidae (Australo-Papuan bellbirds)
                              - - - Paramythiidae (painted berrypickers)
                                  - Vireonidae (vireos)
                                - - Oriolidae (orioles, figbirds)
                                  - Pachycephalidae (whistlers)
                      - - Malaconotoidea
                          - Machaerirhynchidae (boatbills)
                          - - Artamidae (woodswallows, butcherbirds)
                            - - Rhagologidae (mottled berryhunter)
                              - - - Malaconotidae (bush-shrikes, puffbacks)
                                  - - Aegithinidae (ioras)
                                    - Pityriaseidae (bristlehead)
                                - - Platysteiridae (wattle-eyes, batsies)
                                  - Vangidae (vangas)
                        - Corvoidea
                          - Rhipiduridae (fantails)
                          - - Dicruridae (drongos)
                            - - - Monarchidae (monarchs)
                                - - Ifritidae (ifrit)
                                  - Paradisaeidae (birds-of-paradise)
                              - - Corcoracidae (Australian mudnesters)
                                - - Melampittidae (melampittas)
                                  - - Corvidae (crows, jays)
                                    - - Laniidae (shrikes)
                                      - Platylophidae (crested jay)
              - Passerides
                - - Cnemophilidae (satinbirds)
                - - - Melanocharitidae (berrypeckers)
                  - - - - Callaeidae (New Zealand wattlebirds)
                        - Notiomystidae (stitchbird)
                    - - - Petroicidae (Australian robins)
                        - - Eupetidae (rail-babbler)
                          - - Chaetopidae (rock-jumpers)
                            - Picathartidae (rockfowl)
                      - - - Sylviida
                            - - Hyliotidae (hyliotas)
                              - Stenostiridae (crested flycatchers)
                            - - - Paridae (tits, chickadees)
                                - Remizidae (penduline tits)
                              - - - Alaudidae (larks)
                                  - Panuridae (bearded reedling)
                                - - Nicatoridae (nicators)
                                  - - Macrosphenidae (crombecs, African warblers)
                                    - - Cisticolidae (cisticolas)
                                      - - - Locustelloidea
                                            - - Acrocephalidae (acrocephalid warblers)
                                              - "Graueriidae"
                                            - - Locustellidae (grassbirds)
                                              - - Bernieridae (Malagasy warblers)
                                                - Donacobiidae (donacobius)
                                        - - - Hirundinidae (martins, swallows)
                                            - Pnoepygidae (wren warblers)
                                          - - Aegithaloidea
                                              - Phylloscopidae (leaf-warblers and allies)
                                              - - Hyliidae (hylias)
                                                - - Aegithalidae (long-tailed tits or bushtits)
                                                  - - Erythrocercidae (yellow flycatchers)
                                                    - - Cettiidae (Cettia bush warblers and allies)
                                                      - Scotocercidae (streaked scrub warbler)
                                            - Sylvioidea
                                              - Pycnonotidae (bulbuls)
                                              - - - Paradoxornithidae (parrotbills, fulvettas)
                                                  - Sylviidae (typical warblers, sylviid babblers)
                                                - - Zosteropidae (white-eyes)
                                                  - - Timaliidae (babblers, tit-babblers, scimitar bablers)
                                                    - - Leiothrichidae (laughingthrushes)
                                                      - Pellorneidae (fulvettas, ground babblers)
                        - - Muscicapida
                            - - Bombycilloidea
                                - Dulidae (palmchat)
                                - - Bombycillidae (waxwings)
                                  - - Ptiliogonatidae (silky-flycatchers)
                                    - - Hylocitreidae (hylocitrea)
                                      - - Hypocoliidae (hypocolius)
                                        - †Mohoidae (Hawaiian honeyeaters)
                            - - - Muscicapoidea
                                  - Elachuridae (elechura)
                                  - - Cinclidae (dippers)
                                    - - - Muscicapidae (Old World flycatchers, chats)
                                        - Turdidae (thrushes)
                                      - - Buphagidae (oxpeckers)
                                        - - Mimidae (mockingbirds, thrashers)
                                          - Sturnidae (starlings, mynas)
                              - - Reguloidea
                                  Regulidae (kinglets)
                                - Certhioidea
                                  - Tichodromidae (wallcreeper)
                                  - - Sittidae (nuthatches)
                                    - - - Certhiidae (treecreepers)
                                        - Salpornithidae (spotted creepers)
                                      - - Polioptilidae (gnatcatchers, gnatwrens)
                                        - Troglodytidae (wrens)
                          - Passerida
                            - - Modulatricidae (dapple-throat & allies)
                              - Promeropidae (sugarbirds)
                            - - - Dicaeidae (flowerpeckers)
                                - Nectariniidae (sunbirds)
                              - - - Chloropseidae (leafbirds)
                                  - Irenidae (fairy bluebirds)
                                - - Peucedramidae (olive warbler)
                                  - - Urocynchramidae (Przevalski's finch)
                                    - - - - Ploceoidea
                                            - Ploceidae (weavers)
                                            - - Estrildidae (estrildid finches)
                                              - Viduidae (indigobirds, whydahs)
                                        - - Prunellidae (accentors)
                                          - - Passeridae (sparrows)
                                            - - Motacillidae (wagtails, pipits)
                                              - - Fringillidae (finches, euphonias)
                                                - Emberizoidea
                                                  - Rhodinocichlidae (thrush-tanager)
                                                  - - - Calcariidae (longspurs, snow buntings)
                                                      - Emberizidae (buntings)
                                                    - - - Cardinalidae (cardinal grosbeaks)
                                                        - - Mitrospingidae (mitrosingus & allies)
                                                          - Thraupidae (tanagers)
                                                      - - Passerellidae (American sparrows)
                                                        - - - Parulidae (wood warblers)
                                                            - - Icteridae (New World blackbirds)
                                                              - Icteriidae (yellow-breasted chat)
                                                          - - Calyptophilidae (chat-tanagers)
                                                            - - Zeledoniidae (wrenthrush)
                                                              - - Phaenicophilidae (Hispaniolan tanagers and allies)
                                                                - - Nesospingidae (Puerto Rican tanager)
                                                                  - Spindalidae (spindalises)
