= Orioloidea =

Scientific classification
- Kingdom: Animalia
- Phylum: Chordata
- Class: Aves
- Order: Passeriformes
- Suborder: Passeri
- Infraorder: Corvides
- Superfamily: Orioloidea

Families
- See text

Superfamily of birds

Orioloidea is a superfamily of birds in the order Passeriformes.

== Systematics ==
Orioloidea contains the following families:

- Psophodidae
- Eulacestomatidae
- Oreoicidae
- Falcunculidae
- Paramythiidae
- Vireonidae
- Oriolidae
- Pachycephalidae
