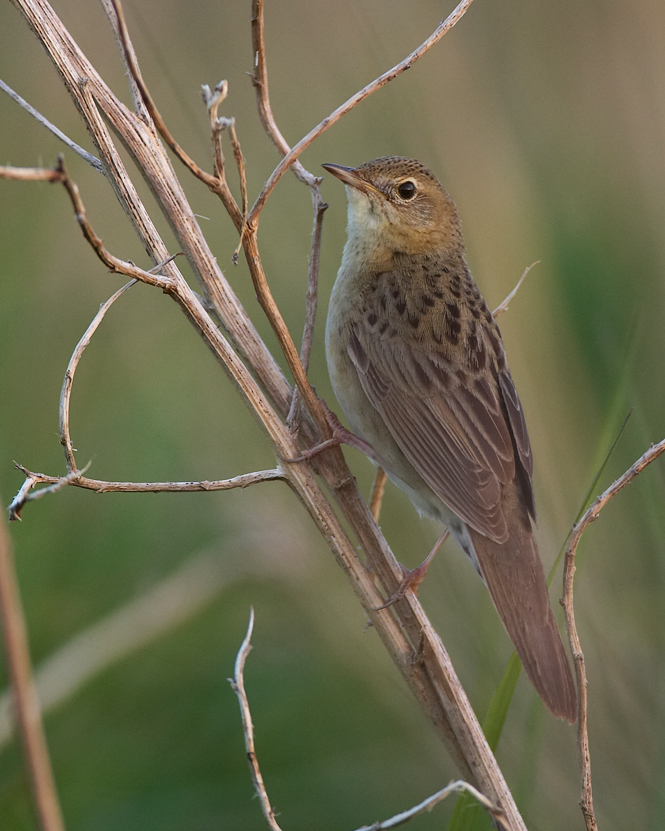
- Locustella naevia, the type species of the subfamily

Scientific classification
- Kingdom: Animalia
- Phylum: Chordata
- Class: Aves
- Order: Passeriformes
- Parvorder: Sylviida
- Superfamily: Locustelloidea

Families
- See text

= Locustelloidea =

Superfamily of birds

Locustelloidea is a superfamily of birds in the order Passeriformes.

== Systematics ==
Locustelloidea contains the following famillies:

- Acrocephalidae
- Donacobiidae
- Bernieridae
- Locustellidae

The families contained are often treated within a broader concept of the superfamily Sylvioidea (syn. Sylviida), together with several other related families.
