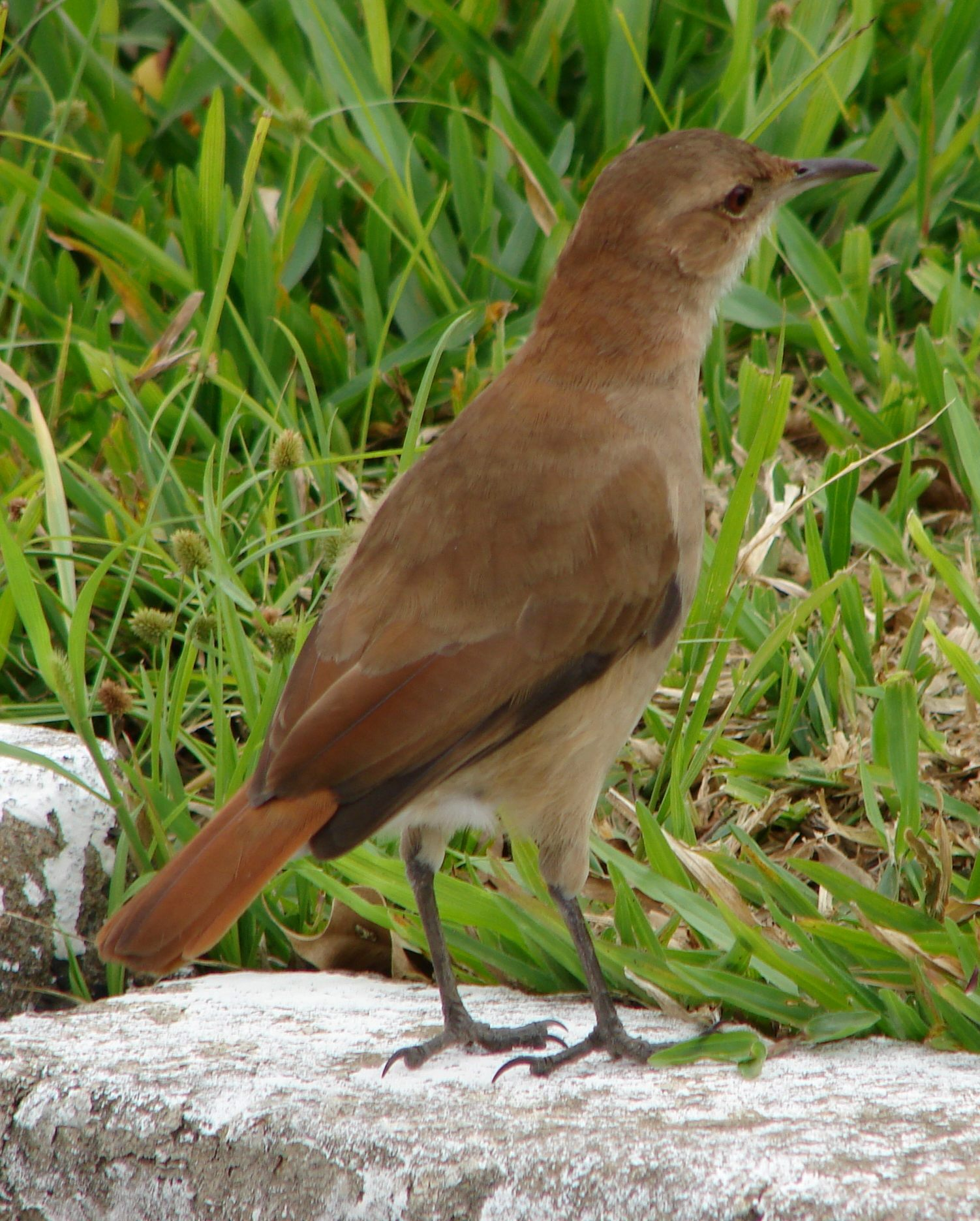
- Rufous hornero (Furnarius rufus)

Scientific classification
- Kingdom: Animalia
- Phylum: Chordata
- Class: Aves
- Order: Passeriformes
- Suborder: Tyranni
- Infraorder: Tyrannides
- Parvorder: Furnariida

Families
- See text

= Furnariida =

Clade of birds

Furnariida is a clade of birds of the Passeriformes.

== Systematics ==
Furnariida contains the following families:

- Melanopareiidae
- Conopophagidae
- Thamnophilidae
- Grallariidae
- Rhinocryptidae
- Formicariidae
- Furnariidae
