= Palaeoscinis =

Palaeoscinis Temporal range: Middle Miocene 13.5–7.5 Ma (Mohnian)

Scientific classification
- Kingdom: Animalia
- Phylum: Chordata
- Class: Aves
- Order: Passeriformes
- Suborder: Passeri
- Family: †Palaeoscinidae; Howard, 1957
- Genus: †Palaeoscinis; Howard, 1957
- Species: †P. turdirostris

Binomial name
- †Palaeoscinis turdirostris Howard, 1957

Genus of fossil songbird

Palaeoscinis (meaning "ancient oscine") is an extinct genus of songbird described in 1957 from the middle Miocene of the Monterey Formation in Santa Barbara, California. It is assigned to the extinct monotypic family Palaeoscinidae, and contains the type and only species P. turdirostris.

The fossil was first discovered in 1955 on two slabs of limestone intended for use as flagstones before being recognised for their significance. It was preserved partly as an imprint of the skeleton with some of bones still intact and in articulation with only slight separation of individual bones, including scattered tracheal rings. The fossil was found in marine sediments, but the anatomy of Palaeoscinis indicates that it was a songbird rather than a seabird. The specific name was chosen for the thrush-like shape of its beak.

The beak is long and slender, similar to that of the modern varied thrush, and its body proportions are also generally similar to thrushes. The legs are relatively short, though, unlike thrushes, and are shorter than the bones of the wing. Feather imprints on the slab suggest the wings may have been relatively short, although it is possible that they were not fully preserved. The foot is typical of songbirds, with a reversed 1st toe and three forward facing ones, of which the middle is the longest and the 2nd is the shortest, with the 1st and 4th toes roughly equal in length. The three forward facing claws are short, but the claw of the reversed 1st toe is long, approximately 70% the length of the preceding toe bone.

Palaeoscinus was assigned to its own family due to the combination of skeletal characteristics (mostly of the sternum, shoulder, and humerus) and its proportions being unlike any modern or fossil family of songbirds. However, it was regarded as similar and possibly related to the Pycnonotidae (bulbuls), Bombycillidae (waxwings), Corvidae, or Cinclidae (dippers) by Howard (1957). It was provisionally allocated as closest to the Pycnonotidae over the other families by Wetmore (1960) based on its proportions, although this relationship is not certain.

The area has produced fossils of other marine animals, including fossils of a shearwater and the "pseudo-toothed" pelagornithid Osteodontornis, as well as a porpoise and fish, alongside fossils of palms.
