= Jamna (bird) =

Jamna Temporal range: Early Oligocene, 30–31 Ma

Scientific classification
- Domain: Eukaryota
- Kingdom: Animalia
- Phylum: Chordata
- Class: Aves
- Order: Passeriformes
- Genus: †Jamna; Bocheński et al., 2011

Type species
- †Jamna szybiaki Bocheński et al., 2011

Extinct genus of birds

Jamna (Polish: Jamna, Polish pronunciation: [ˈjam.na]) is an extinct passeriform bird from early Oligocene deposits of Poland. It has been concluded as a frugivore or omnivore that lived in forests and shrubs. A 2024 study found it to represent a basal passeriform with no close relatives, being the sister group to all other extant passeriforms.
