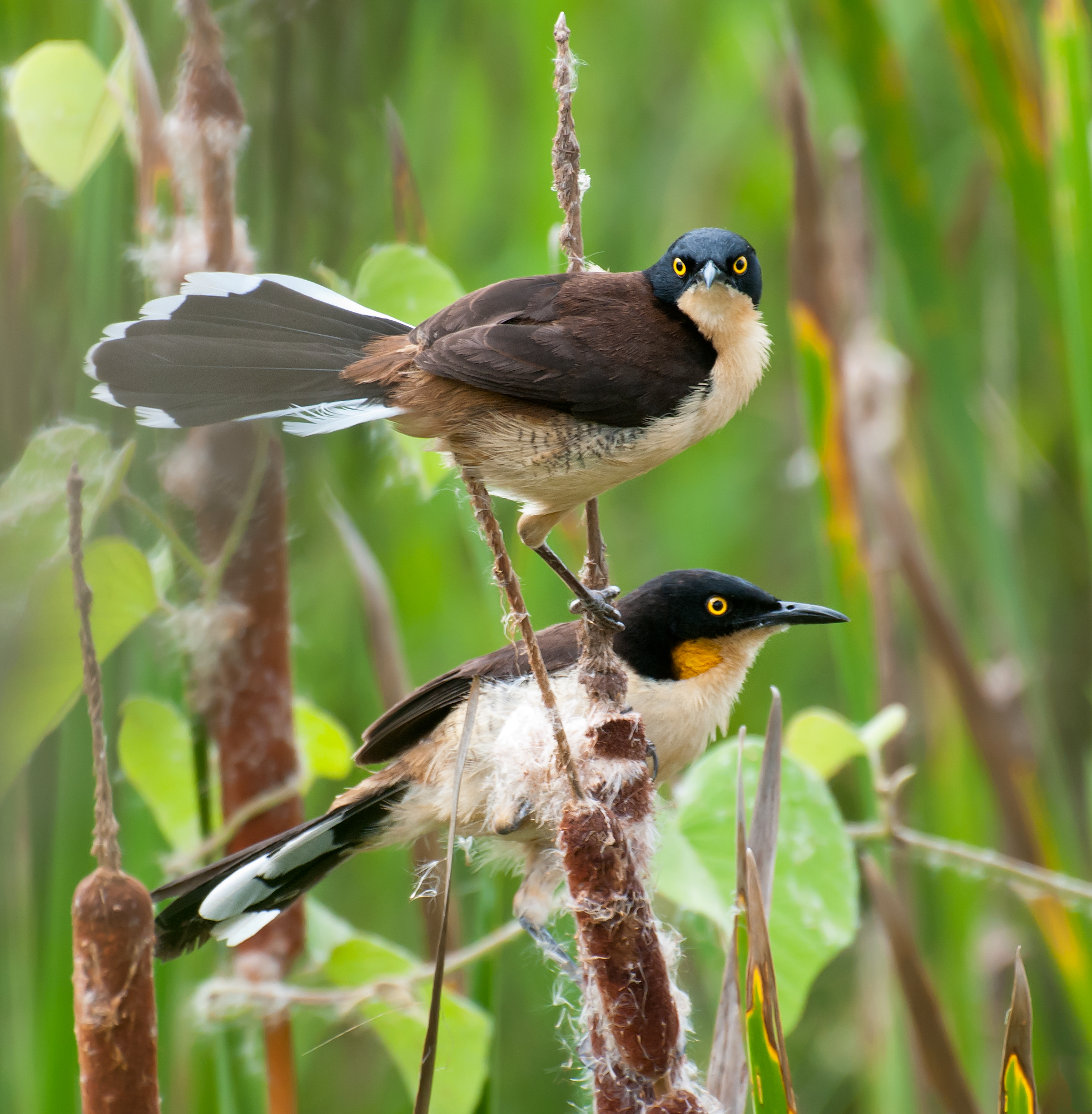
- In Piraju, São Paulo, Brazil; Note lower bird displaying yellow neck patch
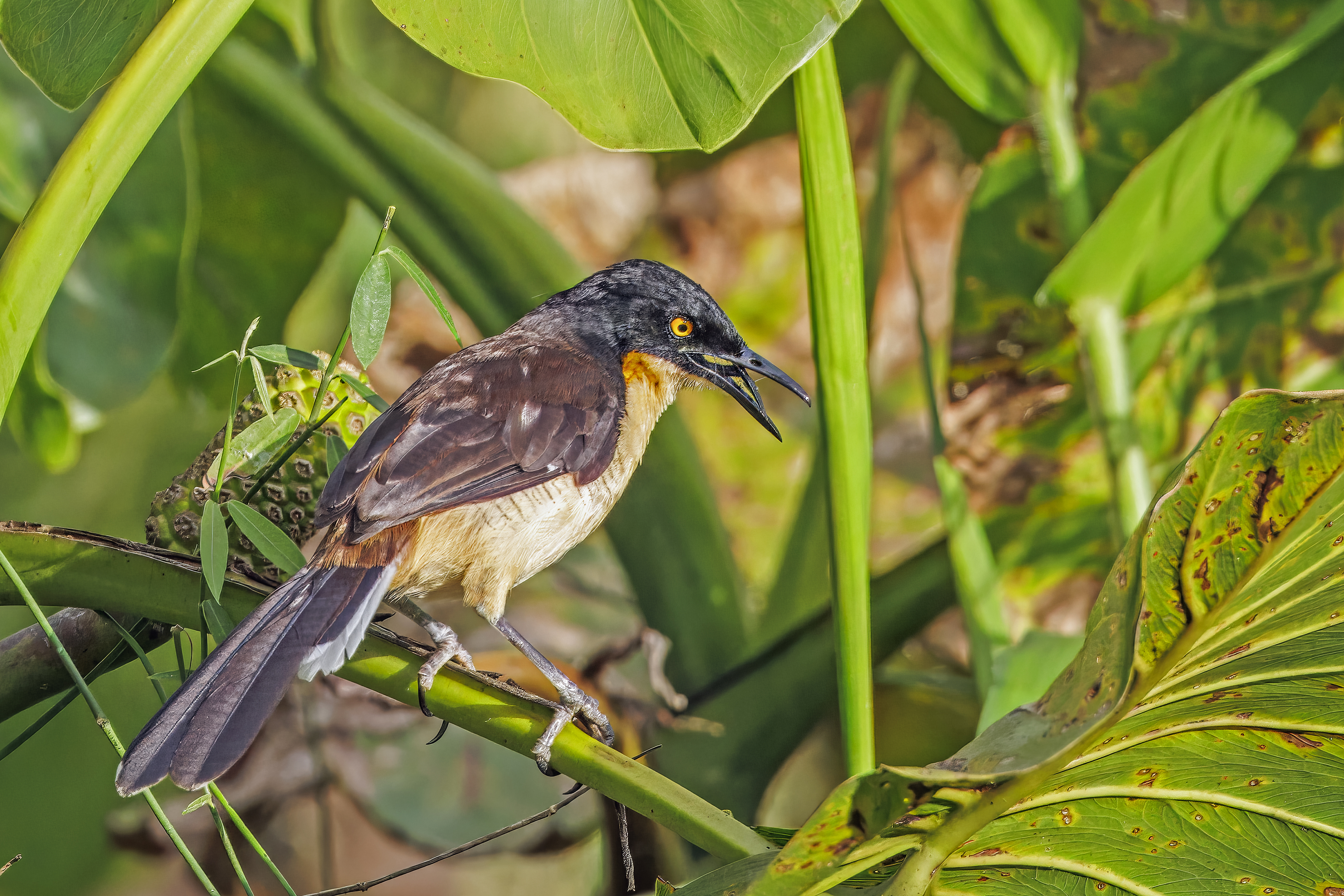
- Donacobius atricapilla nigrodorsalis, Ecuador Song of Black-capped Donacobius

Conservation status
- Least Concern (IUCN 3.1)

Scientific classification
- Kingdom: Animalia
- Phylum: Chordata
- Class: Aves
- Order: Passeriformes
- Superfamily: Locustelloidea
- Family: Donacobiidae; Aleixo & Pacheco, 2006
- Genus: Donacobius; Swainson, 1831
- Species: D. atricapilla

Binomial name
- Donacobius atricapilla (Linnaeus, 1766)
- All-year range

Synonyms
- Turdus atricapilla Linnaeus, 1766

= Black-capped donacobius =

Species of bird

The black-capped donacobius (Donacobius atricapilla) is a conspicuous, vocal South American bird and the only bird in the genus Donacobius and family Donacobiidae. It is distributed across the northern half of South America.

== Taxonomy ==
In 1760 the French zoologist Mathurin Jacques Brisson included a description of the black-capped donacobius in his Ornithologie based on a specimen that he mistakenly believed had been collected from the Cape of Good Hope in South Africa. He used the French name Le merle a test noire de Cap de Bonne Espérance and the Latin Merula Atricapilla Capitis Bonae Spei. Although Brisson coined Latin names, these do not conform to the binomial system and are not recognised by the International Commission on Zoological Nomenclature. When in 1766 the Swedish naturalist Carl Linnaeus updated his Systema Naturae for the twelfth edition, he added 240 species that had been previously described by Brisson. One of these was the black-capped donacobius. Linnaeus included a brief description, coined the binomial name Turdus atricapilla and cited Brisson's work. The type location was subsequently corrected to eastern Brazil. The specific name atricapilla is Latin for "black-haired" from ater, meaning "black", and capillus, meaning "hair of the head". This species is now placed in the genus Donacobius that was introduced by the English naturalist William Swainson in 1831. The genus name Donacobius comes from Ancient Greek δονακος (donakos), meaning "reed", and βίος (bíos), meaning "life".

The black-capped donacobius is the only member of the genus Donacobius, but its familial placement has gone through several changes. In the 19th century, it was placed in the Turdidae, and in the 20th century, moved to the Mimidae. It had various English names, including the "black-capped mockingthrush". In the 1980s and 1990s, suggestions that it was a type of wren (Troglodytidae) were accepted by the South American Classification Committee (SACC), the American Ornithological Society (AOS) and most other authorities. Since at least 2018, the major taxonomic schemes place it in its own family, Donacobiidae, and list it following the reed warblers of the family Acrocephalidae.

== Habitat ==
Black-capped donacobiuses are common in a wide range of Amazonian wetlands, including oxbow lakes, riparian zones, and other areas with tall dense aquatic or semi-aquatic vegetation. A third of the species range is outside the Amazon Basin, from Panama, northern Colombia, and western Venezuela, the Orinoco River system of Venezuela, to southeast coastal and inland Brazil, and neighboring countries southward, Paraguay, and extreme northern Argentina.

== Behavior ==
Mating for life, pairs of black-capped donacobiuses can be seen frequently and throughout the day atop thickets of dense lakeside or streamside vegetation. They often will engage in antiphonic dueting. Adult offspring will remain with their parents and help raise siblings from subsequent nesting periods in a system of cooperative breeding.
