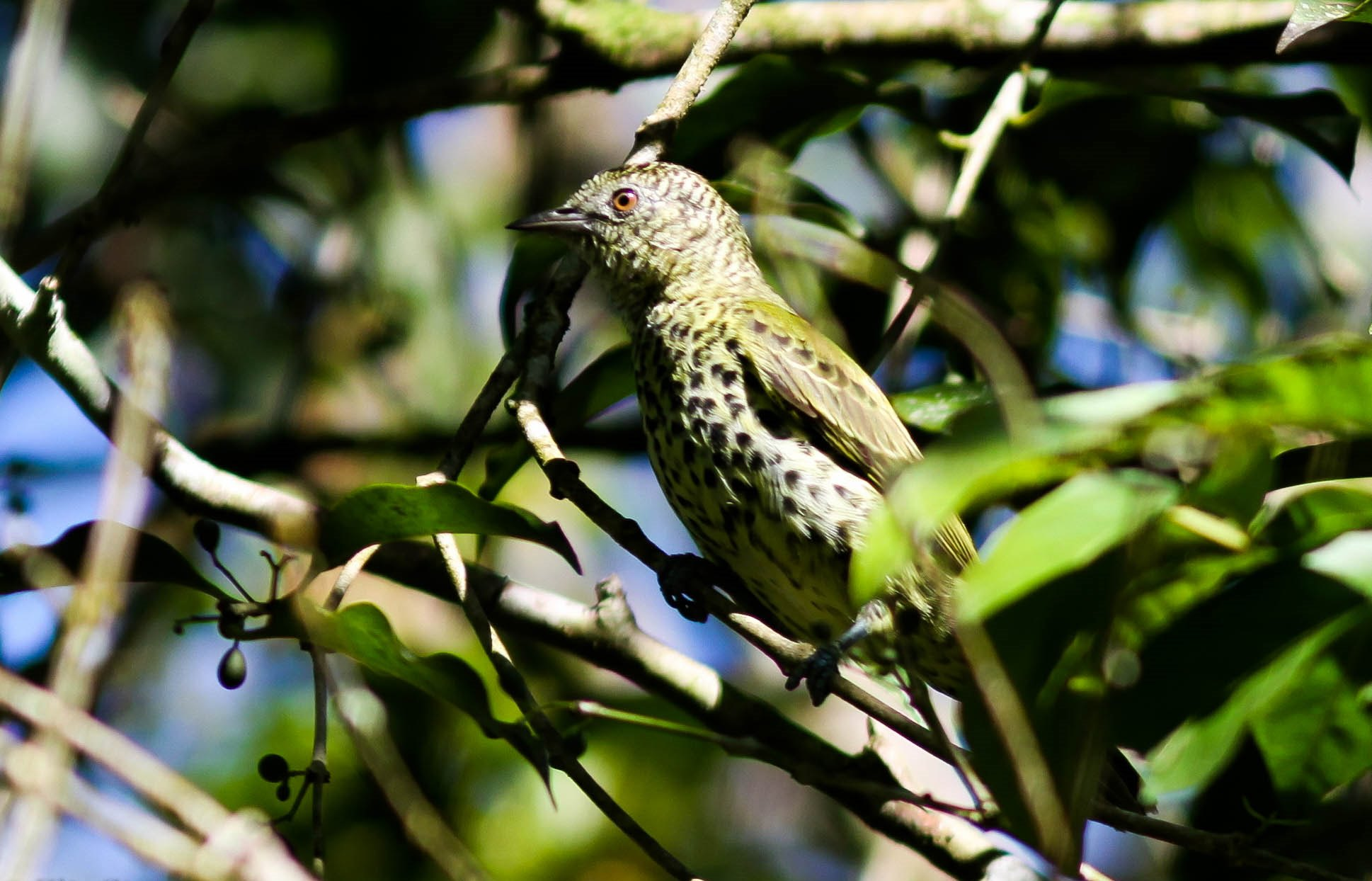

Conservation status
- Least Concern (IUCN 3.1)

Scientific classification
- Kingdom: Animalia
- Phylum: Chordata
- Class: Aves
- Order: Passeriformes
- Parvorder: Tyrannida
- Family: Oxyruncidae; Ridgway, 1906
- Genus: Oxyruncus; Temminck, 1820
- Species: O. cristatus

Binomial name
- Oxyruncus cristatus Swainson, 1821

= Sharpbill =

Species of bird

The sharpbill (Oxyruncus cristatus) is a small passerine bird that is placed in its own family Oxyruncidae. It was formerly placed in the family Tityridae. Its range is from the mountainous areas of tropical South America and southern Central America (Panama and Costa Rica).

It inhabits the canopy of wet forest and feeds on fruit and some invertebrates. It has an orange erectile crest, black-spotted yellowish underparts and scaling on the head and neck. As its name implies, it has a straight, pointed beak, which gives its common name.

Sharpbills are most commonly found in tall dense forests but occasionally venture to the forest edge. Their diet consists of primarily of fruit, but they will also take insects, hanging upside down in from twigs to obtain insect larvae. They will also travel in mixed-species feeding flocks with ovenbirds, tanagers, woodpeckers and cotingas. The breeding system employed by this species is polygamous with closely grouped males displaying in from a lek. The nest of the sharpbill is built by the female and is a small cup built on a slender branch. Chicks are fed by regurgitation.

== Taxonomy ==
The genus Oxyruncus was erected by the Dutch zoologist Coenraad Jacob Temminck in 1820. The sharpbill was described in 1821 by the English naturalist William Swainson under the binomial name Oxyrhuncus cristatus with an "h" inserted into the name of the genus. The word Oxyruncus is from the Ancient Greek oxus for "sharp" or "pointed" and rhunkhos "bill". The specific epithet is from the Latin cristatus for "crested" or "plumed".

The affinities of the sharpbill to other species has long puzzled ornithologists, and this was only settled by the publication of large multilocus DNA sequencing studies. The cladogram below shows the phylogenetic relationships of the sharpbill to other families in the parvorder Tyrannida. It is based on the study by Carl Oliveros and collaborators published in 2019 and the study by Michael Harvey and collaborators that was published in 2020. The families and species numbers are from the list maintained by the International Ornithologists' Union (IOC).

- Tyrannida
  - Tityridae
    becards & allies (37 species in 7 genera)
  - - - Oxyruncidae
        Oxyruncus – sharpbill
      - Onychorhynchidae
        royal flycatchers and allies (7 species in 3 genera)
    - Tyrannidae
      tyrant flycatchers (447 species in 106 genera)

Four subspecies are recognised:

- Oxyruncus cristatus frater (Sclater, PL & Salvin, 1868) – Costa Rica and west Panama
- Oxyruncus cristatus brooksi Bangs & Barbour, 1922 – east Panama
- Oxyruncus cristatus hypoglaucus (Salvin & Godman, 1883) – southeast Venezuela, the Guianas and north Brazil
- Oxyruncus cristatus cristatus Swainson, 1821 – southeast Brazil, east Paraguay and northeast Argentina
