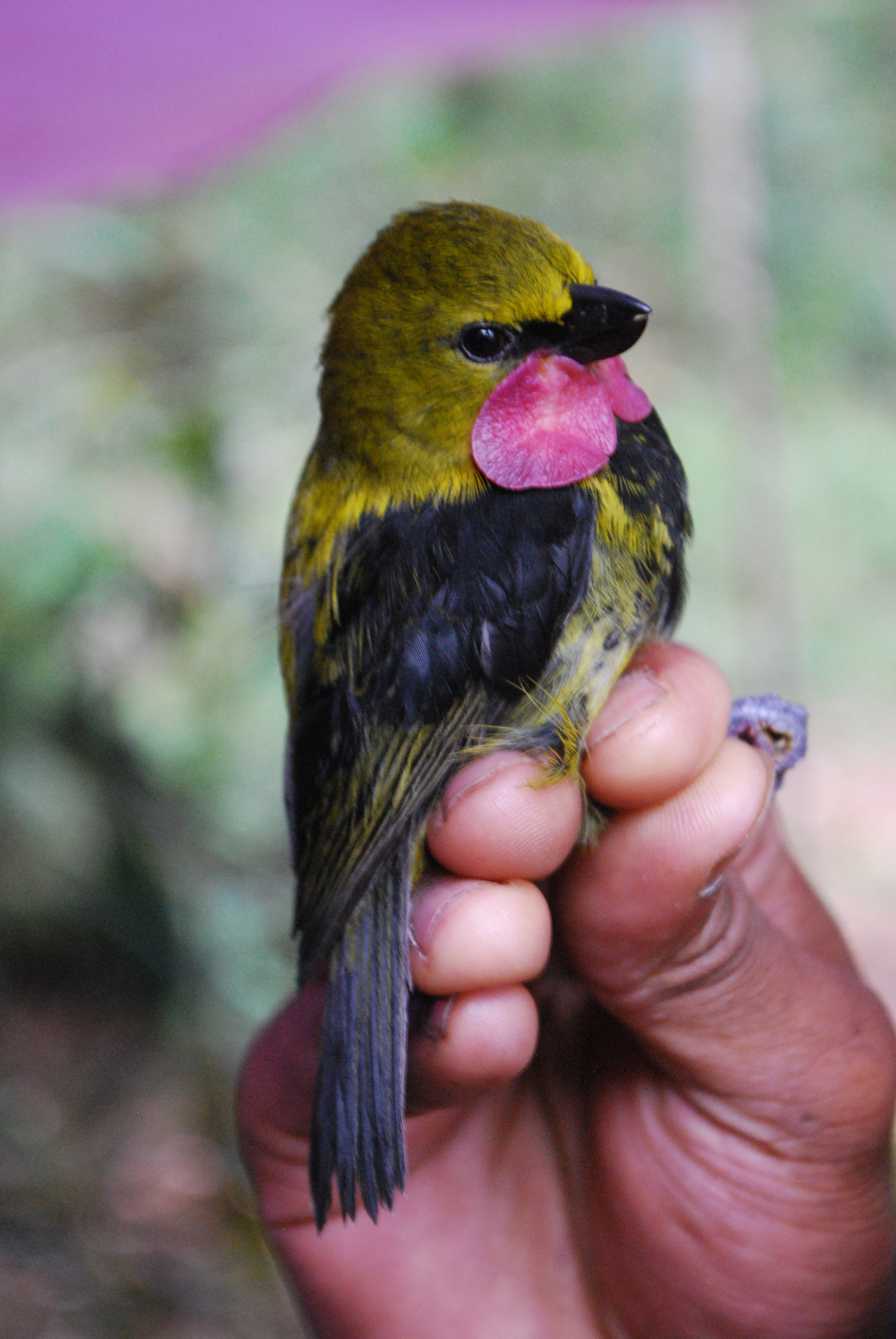
- Male

Conservation status
- Least Concern (IUCN 3.1)

Scientific classification
- Kingdom: Animalia
- Phylum: Chordata
- Class: Aves
- Order: Passeriformes
- Superfamily: Orioloidea
- Family: Eulacestomatidae; Schodde & Christidis, 2014
- Genus: Eulacestoma; De Vis, 1894
- Species: E. nigropectus

Binomial name
- Eulacestoma nigropectus De Vis, 1894

= Wattled ploughbill =

Species of bird

The wattled ploughbill (Eulacestoma nigropectus) is a small bird from New Guinea. It is the only member of the monotypic genus Eulacestoma and family Eulacestomatidae. It is also known as the wattled shrike-tit or ploughshare tit.

== Taxonomy ==
The wattled ploughbill was formally described in 1894 by the English naturalist Charles Walter De Vis. He introduced a new genus Eulacestoma and coined the binomial name Eulacestoma nigropectus. The genus name combines the Ancient Greek eulaka meaning "ploughshare" with stoma meaning "mouth". The specific epithet is from the Latin niger meaning "black" and pectus meaning "breast".

The wattled ploughbill was long thought to be related to the whistlers (Pachycephalidae), and shriketits (formerly Pachycephalidae, now often treated as its own family). In particular the wattled ploughbill and crested shriketit share a similar large bill. Genetic studies have shown that these birds are not closely related, and the wattled ploughbill is instead more closely related to the sittellas. Because of its genetic and morphological uniqueness, in 2014 Richard Schodde and Leslie Christidis placed it in its own monotypic family Eulacestomatidae.

The wattled ploughbill is a monotypic species, meaning it has no accepted subspecies. A subspecies clara has been proposed, but it is not reliably distinct from other birds in this species.

== Description ==
It is approximately 12.5 to 14 cm (4.9–5.5 in) , olive-brown songbird with a strong, thick, wedge-shaped black bill. It weighs 19–22 g (0.67–0.78 oz). The sexes are different. The male has black underparts, an almost golden forehead, black wings with golden scapulars, and a pair of large circular pink wattles on the cheek. The female has olive green plumage and pale olive below. Only the adult male has wattles.

== Distribution and habitat ==
The wattled ploughbill is distributed and endemic to central mountain ranges of New Guinea.

== Behaviour ==
The diet consists mainly of insects. The species feeds from the forest floor to up to 10 m (33 ft), from the understory to the mid-level of the forest. It particularly favours groves of bamboo as a micro-habitat for feeding. It forages on branches and twigs, gleaning insects from the surface and prising off bark to expose prey. The species will readily join mixed-species feeding flocks.

== Conservation ==
Widespread throughout its large range, the wattled ploughbill is evaluated as least concern on the IUCN Red List of Threatened Species.
