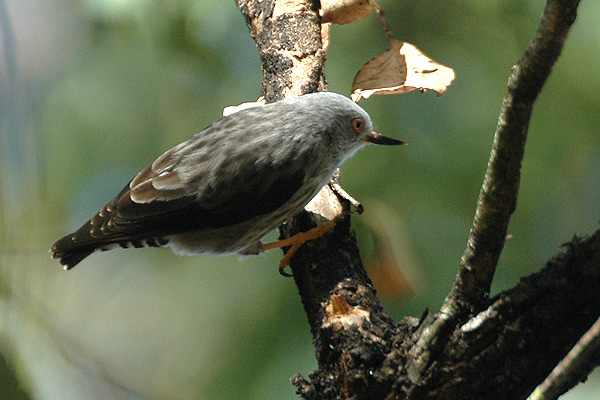
- Varied sittella Daphoenositta chrysoptera

Scientific classification
- Kingdom: Animalia
- Phylum: Chordata
- Class: Aves
- Order: Passeriformes
- Infraorder: Corvides
- Family: Neosittidae; Ridgway, 1904
- Genus: Daphoenositta; De Vis, 1897

Type species
- Daphoenositta miranda De Vis, 1897

Species
- D. miranda; D. chrysoptera; D. papuensis
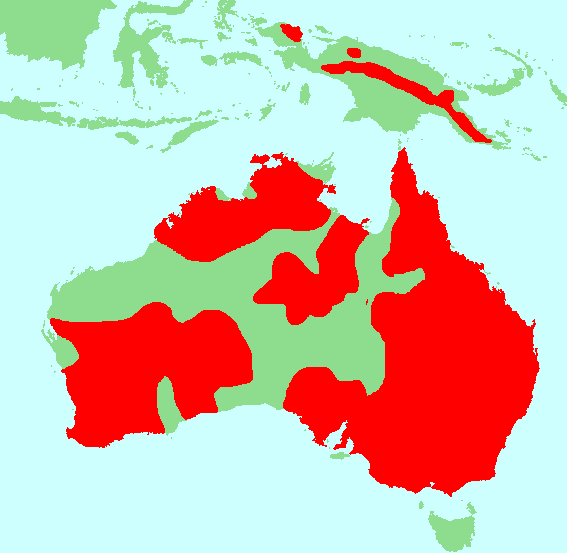
- Global range (In red)

Synonyms
- Neositta

= Sittella =

Sittellas

Genus of birds

The sittellas are a family Neosittidae of small passerine birds found only in Australasia. They resemble nuthatches, but whilst they were considered to be in that family for many years they are now afforded their own family. They do not migrate other than for local movements.

The sittellas are small woodland birds with thin pointed down-curved bills, which they use to extricate insects from bark. Nests are open cups in forked branches.

They were formerly classified in two separate genera with the black sittella in Daphoenositta and the varied and Papuan sittellas in Neositta. The two genera are now usually merged, with Daphoenositta having priority.

== Evolution and taxonomy ==
The true evolutionary affinities of the sittellas have long been clouded by their close resemblance to the Northern Hemisphere nuthatches. As late as 1967 the sittellas were retained in that family by some authorities, although doubts about that placement had been voiced in the previous decades. Both their climbing technique and overall morphology are extremely similar; however they differ both in their sociality and their nesting behaviour, as sittellas create nests on branches whereas nuthatches nest in cavities in trees. In addition the specifics of the morphology of the leg differed, with sittellas having leg muscles more similar to those of the honeyeaters. Their placement was then moved to various families, including the Old World babblers (an infamous wastebasket taxon), the true treecreepers (Certhiidae, which range across the Holarctic and Africa) and the Australian treecreepers (Climacteridae). Their relationship with the Australian radiation of passerines was suggested by S. A. Parker on the basis of egg colour, nest structure and nestling plumage, and their position in this radiation was vindicated by Sibley and Ahlquist's DNA–DNA hybridization studies. These researchers placed the sittellas in a monotypic tribe within the superfamily Corvoidea. Today they are afforded their own family in a clade close to the berrypeckers and longbills (Melanocharitidae) and the whistlers (Pachycephalidae). A molecular genetic study published in 2019 found that the family Neosittidae was sister to the family Mohouidae containing the yellowhead, whitehead and pipipi.

The sittellas comprise a single genus Daphoenositta, which contains three species. The three species were once considered to belong to two genera, but when the two genera were merged, the genus name of the less well known black sittella was adopted due to priority (1897, versus 1901 for Neositta), while the family retained the family name based on the junior synonym Neositta. The most common species, the varied sittella, was once thought to represent five separate species in Australia, but in spite of considerable variation in plumage there are extensive zones of hybridisation where the forms overlap (including an area of Queensland where all five Australian subspecies exist), and are now thought to be a single species with five subspecies. The black sittella is monotypic, while the Papuan sitella has four subspecies.

Daphoenositta trevorworthyi is a fossil sittella species from the middle Miocene, representing the oldest known fossil record of the sittella family. The species was described from a distal tibiotarsus discovered in the Riversleigh World Heritage Area in northwestern Queensland, Australia.

== Species ==
Image	Common name	Scientific name	Distribution
	Black sittella	Daphoenositta miranda	New Guinea
	Varied sittella	Daphoenositta chrysoptera	Australia
	Papuan sittella	Daphoenositta papuensis	New Guinea

== Morphology ==
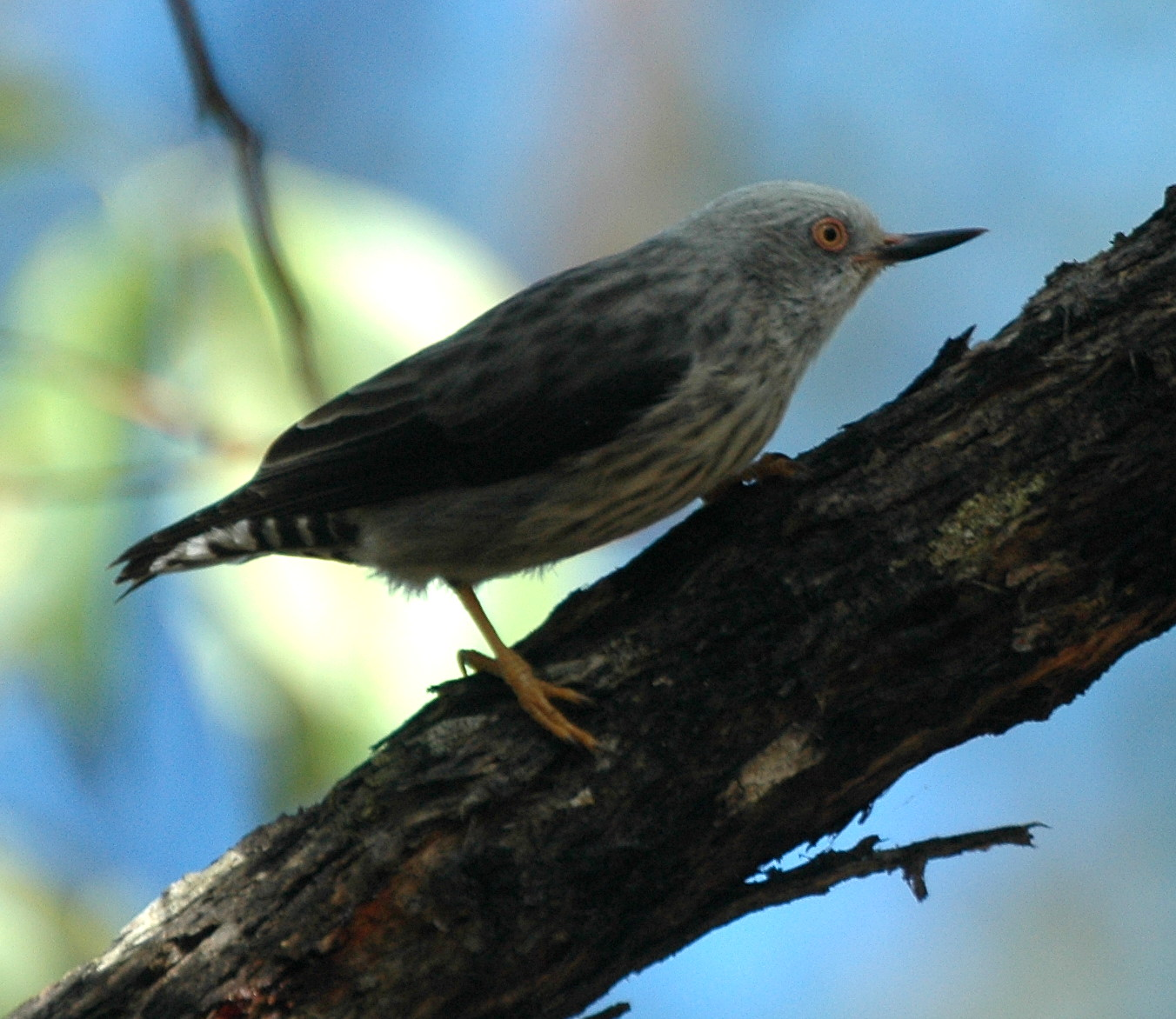
The bill of the varied sittella is upturned.

The three species of sittella are small passerines which resemble the unrelated nuthatches in appearance. The wings are long and broad, and when spread have clearly fingered tips. The family has a generally weak flight, which may explain their inability to colonise suitable habitat on islands like Tasmania. The legs are short but they have long toes, though in spite of their lifestyle they show little adaptation towards climbing. They are between 10 and 14 cm in length and 8 and 20 g in weight, and have short tails; the black sittella tending to be slightly larger and heavier. The bill is dagger shaped in the case of the black sittella and slightly upturned in the varied sittella. The plumage of the black sittella is mostly black with a red face; that of the varied and Papuan sittellas is more complex, with the various subspecies having variation in head and wing colour and pattern. The sexes of some subspecies have entirely black heads, other white, and others dark crowns and paler throats. The backs of most subspecies are grey with darker wings, and the undersides are generally streaked or white. All sittellas exhibit some sexual dimorphism in plumage.

=== Vocalizations ===
The calls of sittellas are generally simple and uncomplicated. Apparently the family has no need for long distance territorial calls, and the majority of calls are simple contact calls utilized to retain flock cohesion. The most commonly heard call is the chip contact call, although there also exists a rallying call (to call together the group), as well as begging calls issued by incubating females.

== Habitat and behaviour ==
The sittellas are social and generally restless birds of scrub, forests and woodlands. In Australia they generally avoid only the dense rainforest, whereas in New Guinea this is the only habitat they inhabit, avoiding only lowland forest. They generally live at low densities, between 0.1 and 0.6 birds per hectare, and are sedentary. The sittellas are generally highly social, usually being found in groups of five or more individuals and only more rarely in pairs. Studies of varied sittellas in New South Wales suggest that they live in clans of eight to twelve individuals and defend mutual territories against other groups. Within the groups, mutual preening is common, and in the evening the groups roost communally as well. Birds traveling to the evening roosts do so at slightly different times, timing their arrival at 30–60 second intervals, presumably so as not to attract the attention of potential predators. Roost sites are usually high in trees on slightly inclined dead branches. All the birds in the group roost next to each other, touching, and facing the same direction. Amongst Australian birds varied sittellas are usually the first to arrive at roost sites in the evening and the last to leave in the morning, although they are not necessarily the first to sleep or last to wake. At the roost site the position occupied along the branch is generally not random; instead males generally adopt positions at the edges of the group whilst young birds tend to be found in the centre.

=== Diet and foraging ===
The principal component of the diet of sittellas are insects and other arthropods. In one study in New South Wales adult beetles were the most common component (~36%) of the varied sittella's diet; particularly favoured were weevils, ladybirds, leaf beetles (Chrysomelidae) and click beetles (Elateridae). A further quarter of the diet was composed of spiders and true bugs. Also taken were beetle and moth larvae, grasshoppers, termites, wasps and bees. Ants were taken relatively infrequently compared to other Australasian birds in similar niches. The proportion of any one item in the diet apparently varies geographically and seasonally, for example another study found that beetle larvae composed 87% of the diet. The diet of the black sittella has, like other aspects of its biology, been little studied, although the stomach contents of one that were examined contained caterpillars and spiders.

Sittellas forage on horizontal branches and the trunks of trees. Their foraging techniques has been described as hopping rapidly along the length of a horizontal branch, pausing briefly to peer for prey, and occasionally hanging underneath the branch but usually on top of it. Most of the time is spent on branches rather than on the trunks. Birds on the trunks may travel upwards or downwards. Within the forest sittellas usually forage in the canopy. There are sexual differences in foraging, with males and females choosing to forage in slightly different microhabitats within the tree. Prey items are usually gleaned directly from the bark, although in a few instances sittellas will sally from the branch in order to snatch aerial prey. Having obtained prey sittellas will use their feet to hold it while they eat it, in a similar manner to parrots, and will also use their feet in order to hold back strips of bark in order to pry underneath it. There have even been isolated reports of tool use in some populations of sittellas. Sticks were used to pry boring beetle larvae out of cavities, in a similar fashion to that of tool using woodpecker finches of the Galápagos Islands.

=== Breeding ===
Very little is known about the breeding of either of the two species of sittella in New Guinea, although black sittellas in breeding condition have been observed August and May, suggesting that they may either be biannual breeders or year round breeders. The varied sittella populations in Australia are cooperative breeders (and the group composition of black sittellas suggest they are too), and possibly have to be in order to be successful. There is some evidence that not only to groups cooperate in raising the young, not an uncommon strategy in birds, but have a plural breeding system, where more than one pair inside the group nest, and the group help raise both broods. There have even been instances of two females sharing a nest.

95% of the nests found in a study in New South Wales were in stringybarks, particularly the species Eucalyptus macrorhycha. The nests were almost always located high in the tree. Nest construction took around 7 days, but lining and decorating the nest added a few days to this. Nest building duties were shared amongst the group, and the speed of construction depended on how many birds were involved. Nests are usually placed in the prong of two branches, and is a deep cup decorated in the bark of the tree it is built in, thereby camouflaging it. Around 2–3 eggs are laid and incubated by the breeding female (or females if two are sharing the nest) for 19–20 days. Whilst incubating the breeding female is fed by the breeding male and helpers. After hatching the female broods the young for a few days, and for up to two weeks at night. The chicks are fed for 19–20 days in the nest. After fledging the chicks have a protracted period of parental care lasting up to 80 days, although 60 days is more usual.
