= Mohua =

Mohua may refer to:

- Golden Bay / Mohua, a bay at the northwest end of New Zealand's South Island
- Yellowhead (bird) or mōhua, a small bird endemic to the South Island of New Zealand
- The Ministry of Housing and Urban Affairs of India, abbreviated MoHua
