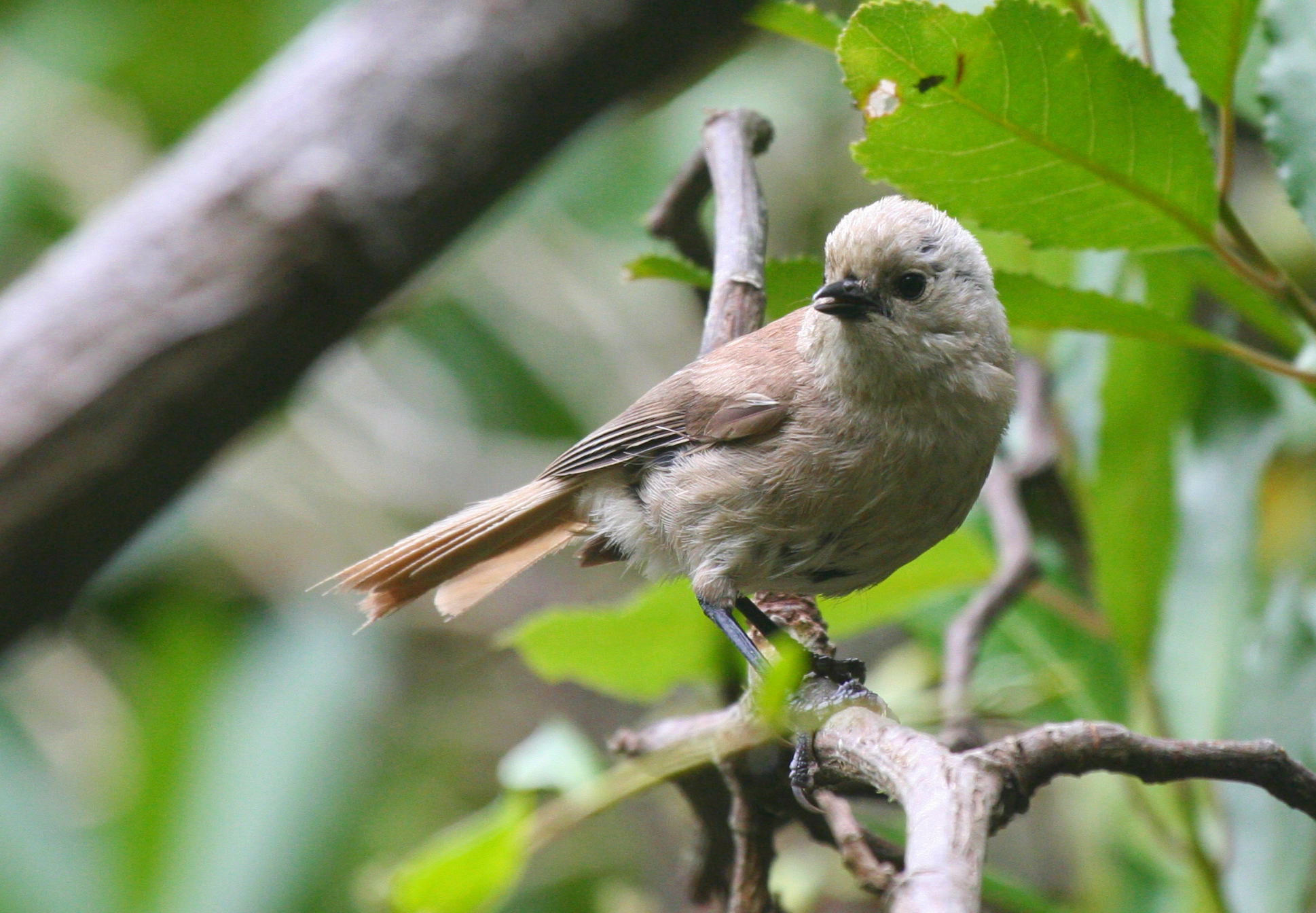
- Whitehead (Mohoua albicilla)

Scientific classification
- Kingdom: Animalia
- Phylum: Chordata
- Class: Aves
- Order: Passeriformes
- Infraorder: Corvides
- Family: Mohouidae; Mathews, 1946
- Genus: Mohoua; Lesson, 1837

Type species
- Certhia heteroclites = Muscicapa ochrocephala Quoy & Gaimard, 1830

= Mohoua =

Genus of birds

Mohoua is a genus of three bird species endemic to New Zealand. The scientific name is taken from mohua – the Māori name for the yellowhead. Their taxonomic placement has presented problems: They have typically been placed in the whistler family, Pachycephalidae, but in 2013 it was established that they are best placed in their own family, Mohouidae. A large molecular genetic study published in 2019 found that the family is sister to the family Neosittidae, containing the three sittellas.

All three species display some degree of sexual dimorphism in terms of size, with the males being the larger of the two sexes. Mohoua are gregarious (more so outside the breeding season) and usually forage in groups. They also forage in mixed species flocks at times, frequently forming the nucleus of such flocks. Social organization and behaviour is well documented for all three Mohoua species; cooperative breeding has been observed in all three species and is common in the whitehead and yellowhead. The three species are the sole hosts for the long-tailed cuckoo (Urodynamis taitensis), which acts as a brood parasite upon them, pushing their eggs out of the nest and laying a single one of its own in their place so that they take no part in incubation of their eggs or in raising their young.

== Taxonomy ==
The genus Mohoua was introduced in 1837 by the French naturalist René Lesson to accommodate a single species, the yellowhead, which is therefore the type species of the genus.

== Species ==
Genus Mohoua – Lesson, 1837 – three species
| Common name | Scientific name and subspecies | Range | Size and ecology | IUCN status and estimated population |
|---|---|---|---|---|
| Whitehead | Mohoua albicilla (Lesson, 1830) | North Island | Size: Habitat: Diet: | LC |
| Pipipi or New Zealand brown creeper | Mohoua novaeseelandiae (Gmelin, 1789) | South Island | Size: Habitat: Diet: | LC |
| Yellowhead | Mohoua ochrocephala (Gmelin, 1789) | South Island | Size: Habitat: Diet: | NT 5000-20000 |
