= Daphoenositta trevorworthyi =

Daphoenositta trevorworthyi Temporal range: Miocene

Scientific classification
- Kingdom: Animalia
- Phylum: Chordata
- Class: Aves
- Order: Passeriformes
- Family: Neosittidae
- Genus: Daphoenositta
- Species: †D. trevorworthyi

Binomial name
- †Daphoenositta trevorworthyi Nguyen, 2016

Extinct species of bird

Daphoenositta trevorworthyi is an extinct species of sitella in the genus Daphoenositta that inhabited Australia during the Miocene epoch.
