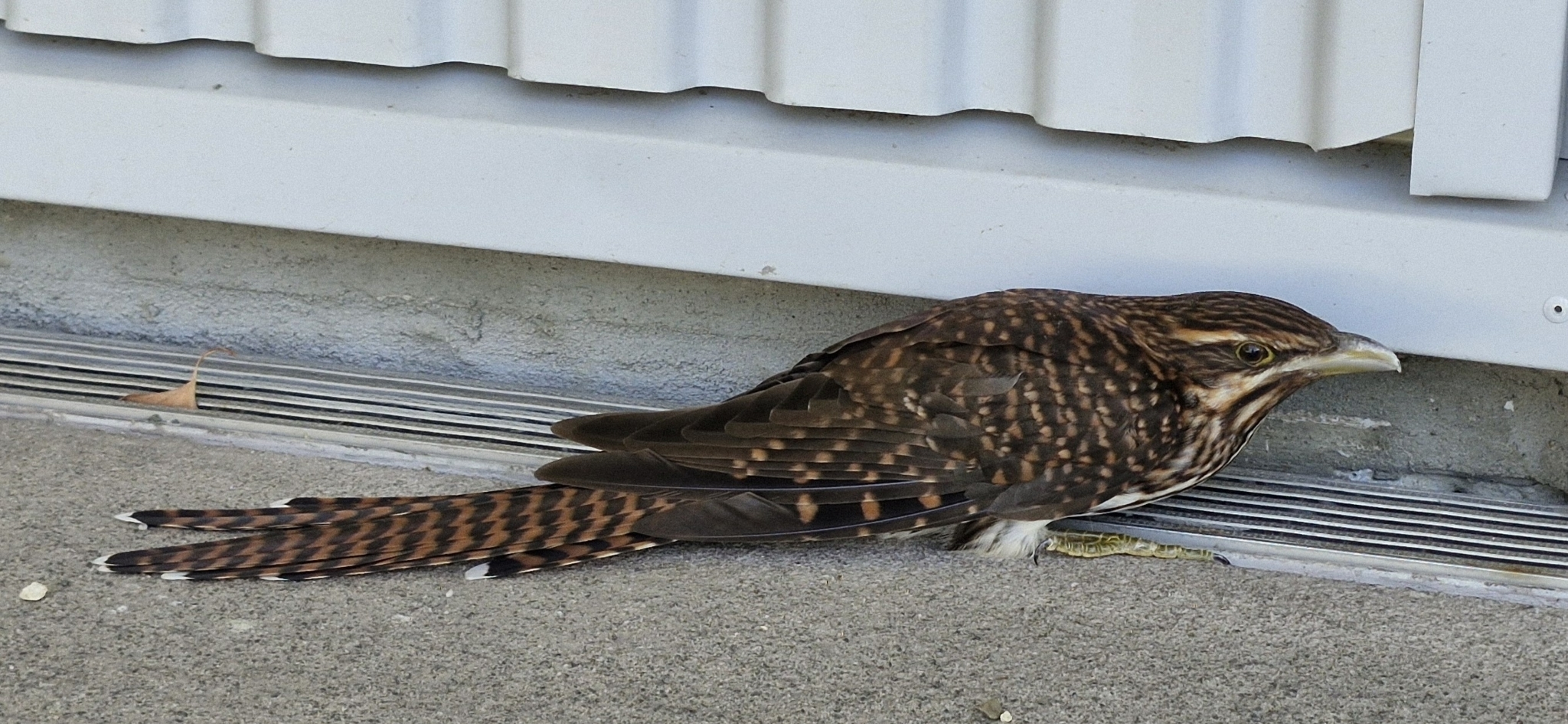

Conservation status
- Least Concern (IUCN 3.1)

Scientific classification
- Kingdom: Animalia
- Phylum: Chordata
- Class: Aves
- Order: Cuculiformes
- Family: Cuculidae
- Genus: Urodynamis; Salvadori, 1880
- Species: U. taitensis

Binomial name
- Urodynamis taitensis (Sparrman, 1787)

Synonyms
- Cuculus taitensis Eudynamys taitensis

= Long-tailed koel =

Long-tailed cuckoo

Species of bird

The long-tailed koel (Urodynamis taitensis), also known as the long-tailed cuckoo, Pacific long-tailed cuckoo, sparrow hawk, home owl, screecher, screamer or koekoeā in Māori, is a species of the Cuculidae bird family (the cuckoos). It is the only species placed in the genus Urodynamis. It is a migratory bird that spends spring and summer in New Zealand, its only breeding place, and spends winter in the Pacific islands. It is a brood parasite, laying its eggs in the nests of other bird species and leaving them to raise its chicks.

== Taxonomy ==
Urodynamis taitensis is most closely related to the channel-billed cuckoo (Scythrops novaehollandiae), which lives in Australia, Papua New Guinea and Indonesia, according to Sorenson and Payne (2005). Accordingly, it is not part of the Eudynamys genus (the true koels), with which it has previously been placed.

== Description ==
The long-tailed koel is approximately 40–42 cm in length, with a wingspan of approximately 47–52 cm, and weighs about 120 grams. It has broad pointed wings and a long tail that is softly rounded at the tip. Its beak is short and stout with a slightly hooked tip. It has brown barring to brown upperparts, and dark streaking to white underparts. Both males and females share similar features. A juvenile cuckoo is markedly different from the adult: it is spotted, with buff underneath and on the sides of the head and neck.

Adult. Top of head and hindneck, dark brown, boldly streaked buff. Supercilium, White's, bordered below by bold dark-brown eye stripe continuing downsides of neck, cheeks, chin, throat and foreneck, whites with thin brown stripes and fine black streaking on near neck and throat. The remainder of the upperparts are brown with white spotting on wing. Tail is tipped white. The underbody is white with course black brown streaking. Legs and feet are gray to green.

The long-tailed koel have a loud and intense sound, a "shrill whistle"; it is sometimes called the "screamer".

== Distribution and habitat ==
Endemic to New Zealand, where they can be found on Little Barrier Island, the West Coast of the South Island, Nelson, and throughout the central North Island.

The long-tailed koel prefers to live in forest on mainland and near shore or offshore islands, from sea level. in mountainous areas, more often on vegetated ridges than in valleys. Usually in dense, closed canopy of native forests dominated by beech (Nothofagus), broadleaf species or podocarps or mixtures, with or without shrub layer. Usually surrounded by plantations of pines (Pinus). Can be around other vegetation such as mānuka (Lepotospermum scoparium) by rivers or forests or mountainous areas. Occasionally can be found in recreational parks, residential areas and gardens.

In New Zealand, the cuckoos live mainly in native forest, particularly up in the canopy. They also live in exotic pine plantations, scrub, cultivated land and suburban gardens. In the Pacific islands they live in lowland forest, gardens and coconut plantations. Individuals are usually solitary.

The long-tailed koel breeds only in New Zealand, where it is resident in the warmer months, from early October until February or March, sometimes April and occasionally later. The length of an average one-way journey from New Zealand to Polynesia is around 2500–3500 kilometres and thus travel over 6000 kilometers. For winter, the bird migrates to islands right across the southern Pacific. It is found year-round on the Kermadec Islands, the Norfolk Island group and the Lord Howe Island group, which are subtropical islands part way between the New Zealand mainland and the tropical Pacific Islands. The spread of its winter distribution is extraordinarily wide, stretching almost 11,000 km from Palau in the west to Pitcairn Island. Over most of its winter range, it is known by the indigenous name, kārewarewa (or local variations of this). In spring, the bird's routes of migration would almost certainly have served to guide the Polynesian ancestors of Māori to find New Zealand.

== Behaviour ==
=== Breeding ===
Long-tailed koel have many partners during their lifetime. They mate and break-up easily. Males gain attraction from females through spanning their wings and fluttering them whilst calling.

Male cuckoo have a high pitched sound and they are very territorial. You will hear them calling either to make known their territory to other birds or as a call for a mate. Female cuckoo are similar in their vocal intensity. Their behaviour is sexual and combative when mating. Male often display their wings or their ability to fly well when looking for a mate.

Cuckoos do not build their own nest or rear their young. The species is a brood parasite laying its eggs in the nests of Mohoua species mostly – whiteheads (M. albicilla) in the North Island and yellowheads (M. ochrocephala) and brown creepers (M. novaeseelandiae) in the South Island. They also lay in nests of robins (Petroica australis longpipes), tomtits (Petroica macrocephala toitoi), and one reported instance of laying in a New Zealand fantail nest. The eggs hatch before those of the host and the young chicks eject the eggs of the host. Long-tailed cuckoo chicks are able to mimic the calls of their host's chicks.

=== Feeding ===
The long-tailed koel mostly eats insects. It also eat bird eggs and nestling birds, adult birds as large as sparrows, New Zealand bellbirds and thrushes, and lizards. It occasionally eats fruit and seeds. Young birds are fed insects by their host parents.

The long-tailed koel hardly ever forage on the ground and instead forage at the top of trees or in shrubs. Foraging is mainly done at night.

== Predators ==
Long-tailed koels are an at risk species in New Zealand and are very uncommon. Predators include rats and stoats.

== In culture ==
Māori believed that the arrival of long-tailed cuckoos indicated that it was time to plant sweet potato or kūmara, and that their departure meant it was time to harvest them.
