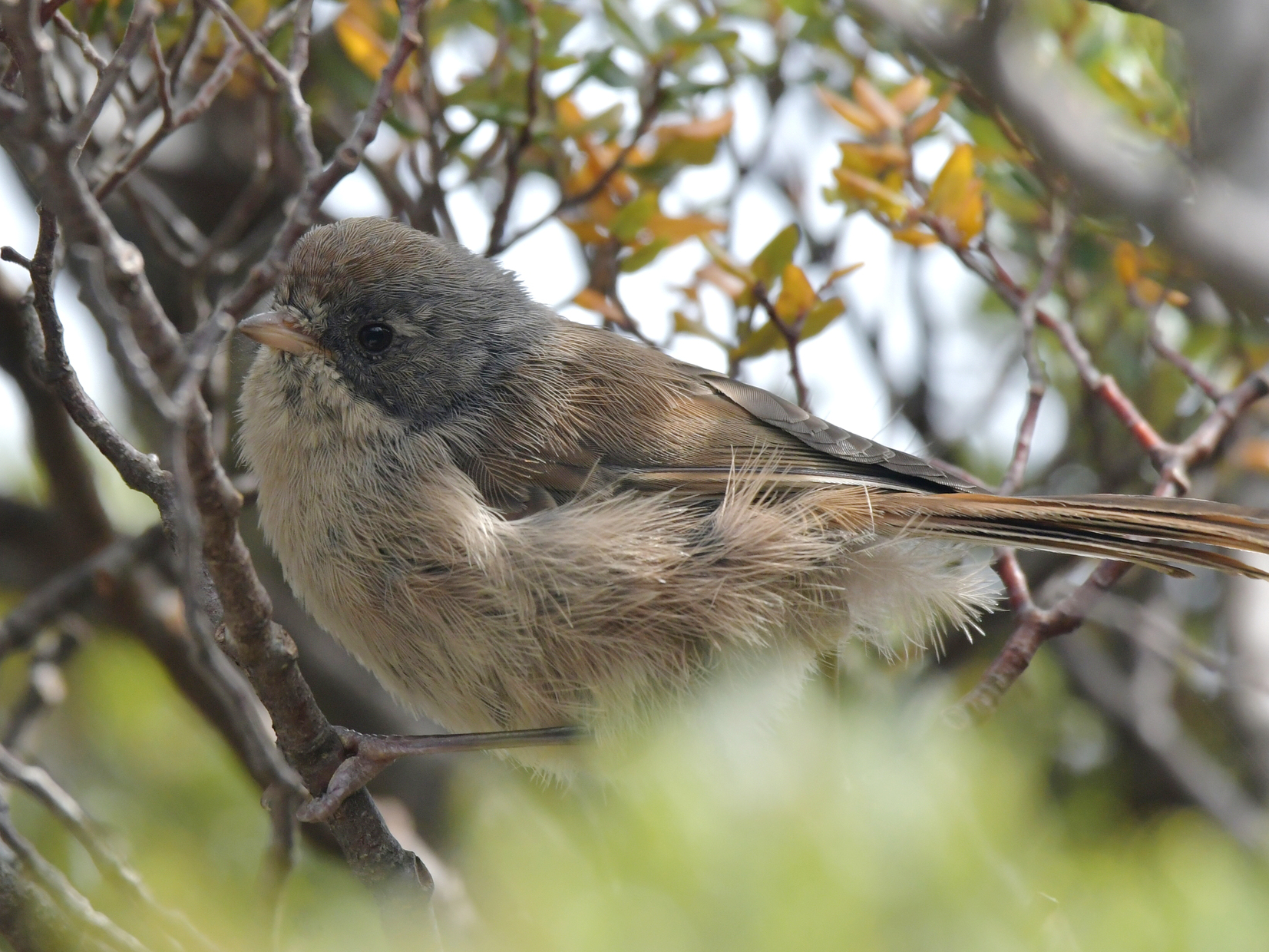

Conservation status
- Least Concern (IUCN 3.1)

Scientific classification
- Kingdom: Animalia
- Phylum: Chordata
- Class: Aves
- Order: Passeriformes
- Family: Mohouidae
- Genus: Mohoua
- Species: M. novaeseelandiae

Binomial name
- Mohoua novaeseelandiae (Gmelin, JF, 1789)
- Native range of the pīpipi on a map of the South Island

Synonyms
- Finschia novaeseelandiae

= Pīpipi =

Species of bird

The pīpipi (Mohoua novaeseelandiae), also known as brown creeper or New Zealand creeper, is a small passerine bird endemic to the South Island, Stewart Island and their surrounding islands, in New Zealand. It was called the New Zealand titmouse in the 1780s. It is a specialist insectivore, gleaning insects from branches and leaves. They have strong legs and toes for hanging upside down while feeding.

== Taxonomy and naming ==
The pīpipi was formally described in 1789 by the German naturalist Johann Friedrich Gmelin in his revised and expanded edition of Carl Linnaeus's Systema Naturae. He placed it with the tits in the genus Parus and coined the binomial name Parus novaeseelandiae. Gmelin based his description on the "New-Zealand titmouse" that had been described in 1783 by the English ornithologist John Latham in his book A General Synopsis of Birds. The naturalist Joseph Banks had provided Latham with a watercolour painting of the bird by Georg Forster who had accompanied James Cook on his second voyage to the Pacific Ocean. The specimen had been collected in 1773 at Dusky Sound on the southwest coast of New Zealand. This picture is now the holotype for the species and is in the collection of the Natural History Museum in London.

The pīpipi was formerly placed in its own genus Finschia. A DNA study published in 1987 found that it was closely related to the whitehead and yellowhead, so Finschia was merged into Mohoua, a genus that was introduced by the French naturalist René Lesson in 1837. The species is monotypic: no subspecies are recognised.

There are four Māori names for the species: pīpipi, pipirihika, tītirihika and toitoi. American ornithologists Charles Sibley and Burt Monroe were among the first, if not the first, to use the name "pipipi" (Note: In this section of the article, capital letters for bird names are not retained from the sources, except for parts of names that are also proper names. The absence or presence of macrons in the sources is retained.) as the primary English name, in their 1990 Distribution and Taxonomy of Birds of the World. Presumably they did so to give it a different name from a North American species also called "brown creeper", Certhia americana, which is not closely related to the New Zealand species. Since then, "pipipi" has been used as the name in the United States. The book Birds of the World: Recommended English Names, produced on behalf of the International Ornithologists' Union in 2006, recommended "pipipi" as the English name. This was criticised by New Zealand ornithologist Paul Scofield, among other criticisms of the book. He advocated that "brown creeper" be retained, suggesting that Certhia americana instead be renamed "brown treecreeper", all the other Certhia being called "treecreepers"; Certhia americana is also known as the "American treecreeper". Handbook of the Birds of the World Volume 12 (2007) called Mohoua novaeseelandiae the "New Zealand brown creeper". Australian ornithologist Peter Higgins noted that this was a departure from the usual New Zealand name of "brown creeper", and also from the Birds of the World recommendation. The Field Guide to the Birds of New Zealand (2015) calls it the "brown creeper", with "pipipi" as an "other name". The fifth edition of Checklist of the Birds of New Zealand, published by the Ornithological Society of New Zealand (OSNZ) in 2022, gives the common names "brown creeper | pīpipi", with the first name being the one that had been used most often in the OSNZ journal Notornis over the preceding decade.

== Description ==
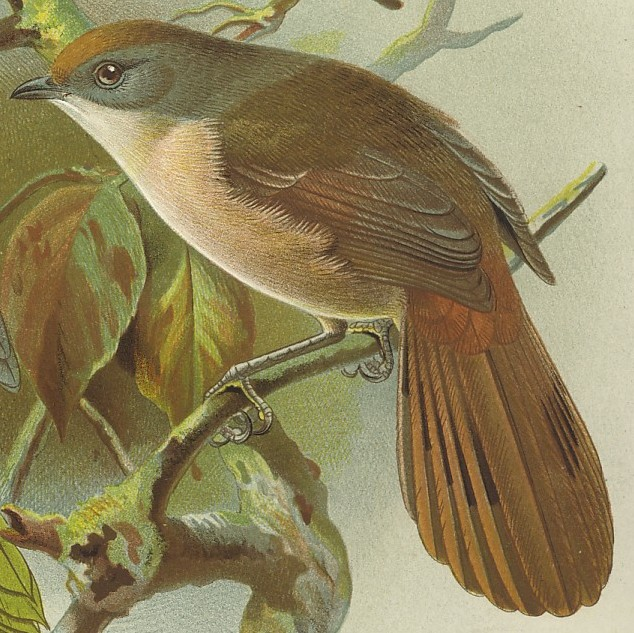
Brown Creeper, A History of the Birds of New Zealand, Buller, 1888

A warm mix of brown and chestnut on the upper part of the bird whilst the lower section is a noticeably paler brown. The head is a mix of patches of chestnut brown and dark brown with spots and streaks. The face and zones behind it can be an ash/dark grey. The whiteish eye stripe is another distinguishing feature of brown creeper. The legs and beak are a pinkish or grey-brown colour. The tail is long, frayed and has a distinctive dark bar at the tip and the eyes are a dark reddish brown.

The sexes and juveniles are very similar in appearance. Juveniles can be distinguished from adults before May as the juveniles have yellow bill flanges and dark brown legs. Juveniles are distinguishable by having a greyer head, i.e. less reddish-brown, in addition to lacking the white stripe behind the eye. Brown creepers moult in late summer.

The males weigh on average 13.5 g, whilst the females weigh on average 11.0 g. Brown creepers are about 13 cm in size.

Brown creepers are the least known of the three species in the genus, despite being relatively common. This is due to them often being heard, but not seen as they live amongst the tree canopies and rarely feed on the ground. Their conversational song is also relatively indistinct (raspy calls) compared to other small bird species, making them further difficult to identify.

Brown creepers are vocal all year round except when they are moulting in late summer. Territorial songs peak in spring with only the male brown creepers giving off a long territorial song. This song varies from bird to bird. The male song will be a mixture of slurs, musical whistles and harsh notes, where as the female song is a rapid sequence of brief notes with the last note being high pitched and prolonged. The brown creeper song consists of short and attractive warbles, very distinct from other species, however the "conversational chatter" can be easily confused for other small bush-dwelling birds.

== Distribution and habitat ==
South of Cook Strait, New Zealand They are distributed widely, but patchily, in forests of the South Island, with some isolated populations persisting in places such as Banks Peninsula, Mount Peel, Hunters Hill and locations throughout Otago. Common on some off shore islands in Fiordland (Secretary, Resolution and Chalky) and Marlborough Sounds (D'Urville, Arapawa and Maud). Widely common on Stewart Island and its surrounding islands (Ulva and North-East Muttonbird). Brown creepers are particularly abundant on Codfish Island.

Brown creepers inhabit a diverse range of habitats. These include native beech and podocarp forest, exotic plantations as well as willow, gorse and broom, regenerating forest, mānuka or kānuka scrub forests, the river flats of the east and the higher altitude mountain/silver beech and red/silver beech forests in the mountains. They will happily live in areas from the sea to the treeline. Their preferred area of the South Island is to the west and north of the Southern Alps as well as Fiordland. The dry scrub forests of Marlborough and Canterbury are also common habitat for brown creepers. Brown creepers that breed at high altitude will come down to the lowlands and form flocks in the winter. Other than that they are non-migratory.

For nesting, brown creepers prefer dense vegetation in the forest canopy.

Their numbers have declined since Europeans arrived in New Zealand due to destruction of lowland forest and the arrival of mammalian predators.

== Behaviour and ecology ==
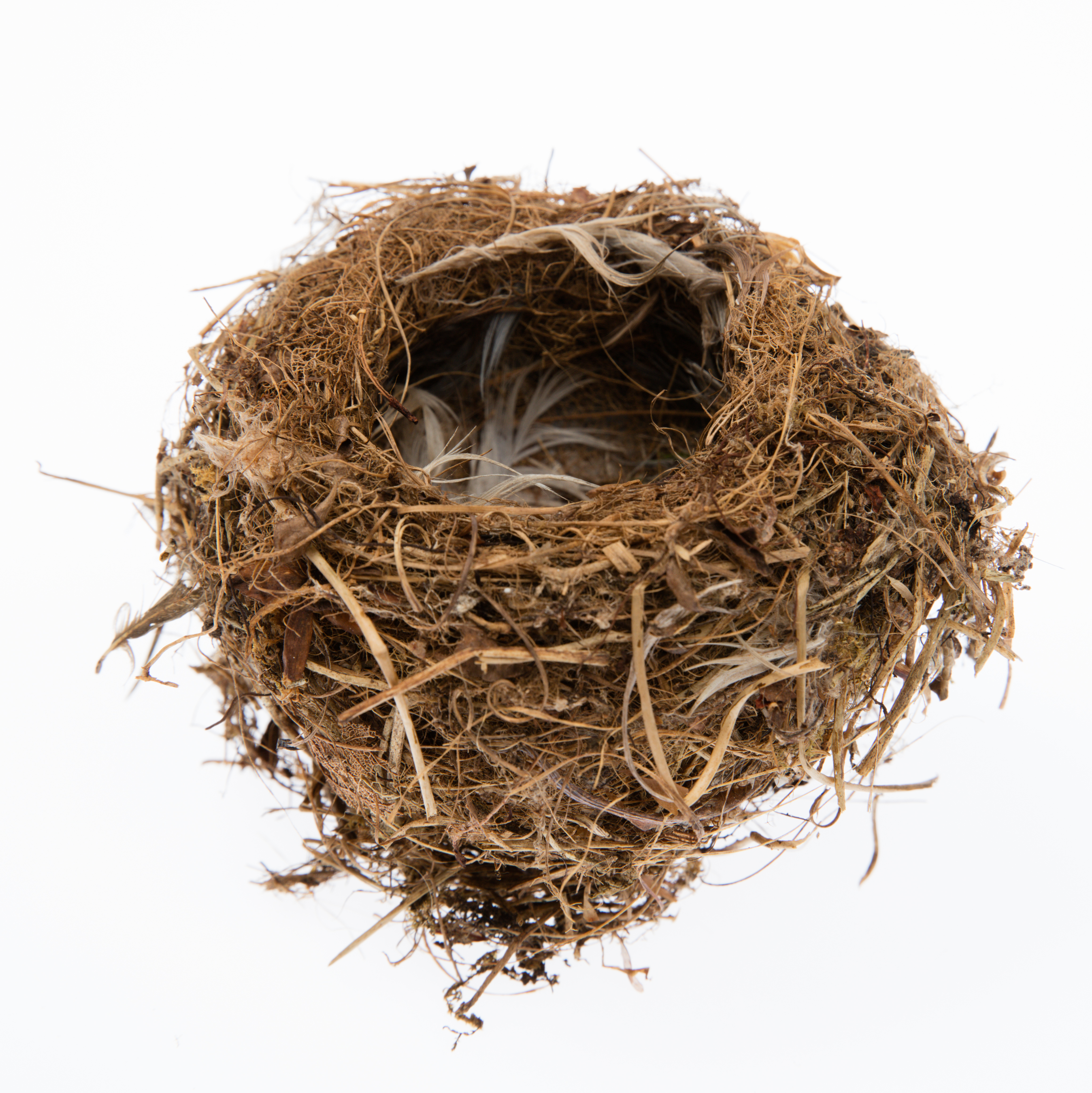
Nest from the collection of Auckland Museum

=== Breeding ===
Brown creepers are monogamous and display high rates of mate fidelity. They will usually only change mates if their previous mate dies as opposed to just general mate swapping or divorce. Pairs will strongly defend their territory during the breeding season and to a lesser extent during the rest of the year as well. Pairs will perform duets to maintain and strengthen their bond.

In September females will build a nest out of bark, twigs, grass, moss, leaves, leaf skeletons and lichen, all of which is bound together with cobwebs and lined with grasses, feathers and wool. The nest is a deep cup shape and usually takes between 5–17 days to construct. The nest is built in dense canopy vegetation, scrub or low trees between 1m and 10m above the ground. The male will guard the female during this nest building phase as well as 2–3 days before the egg is laid.

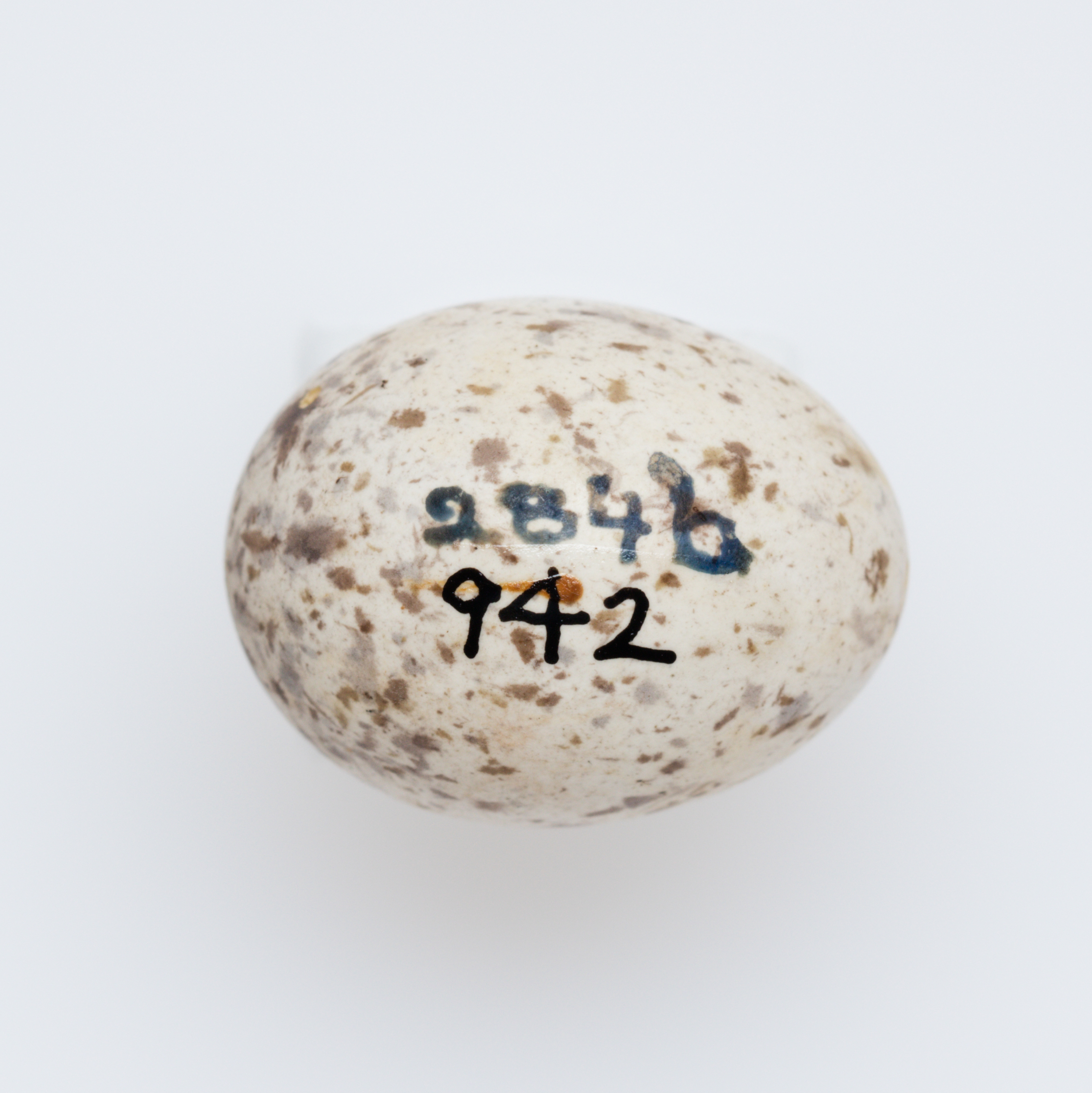
Mohoua novaeseelandiae egg in the collection of Auckland Museum

Brown creepers can lay their eggs from late September until early February. Males will not only guard the females during the 2–3 days prior to the eggs being laid but during the first part of the laying period as well. Female brown creepers will normally have two clutches per season with egg laying peaks in early October and late November. They can have up to four clutches in a season if the nest fails early on but they will only ever brood two clutches of eggs.

Brown creepers will have 2–4 eggs at 24 hour intervals. The size of the egg is 18.5mm x 14mm and weights on average 1.9g. The female will incubate the eggs alone for 17–21 days until the eggs hatch.

The eggs are white – dark pink and are speckled reddish brown. They are about 2 cm long.

Both birds will feed the young until they are ready to fledge at around 18–22 days old. Once the female starts to incubate the second clutch then the male will take over and continue feeding the fledgings. In drought conditions there have been examples of the brown creepers showing cooperative breeding. If their nesting attempts fail, then they will start contributing food to another nest as well as helping brood the successful brown creeper pairs chicks. The young birds will be feed through until the end of winter at the latest before they become independent (35–65 days). Brown creepers can also be seen during the summer months feeding a long-tailed cuckoo chick that is much larger than themselves. Brown creepers are the main host of long-tailed cuckoo (Urodynamis taitensis) in the South Island and Stewart Island.

Once the young birds become independent they will form groups with the rest of the young from that year through autumn and winter. These flocks can contain up to 60 birds and are often mixed in with other forest bird species such as fantails, grey warblers, silvereyes and bellbirds. The juveniles can breed after one year. Juvenile males will learn their song from neighboring males and not their parents. During the first week out of the nest, juveniles will huddle together during the daylight hours so that their tail feathers can grow and their wings can become stronger.

Of the eggs produced 63% hatch and 36% of these become fledglings. Predation can account for 62% of egg loss and 66% of nestling loss. Brown creepers have an overall success rate of 1.6 fledglings/adult/year. In Kaikoura, adult survival rates were at 82% and brown creeper life expectancy was 5 years.

=== Food and feeding ===
Brown creepers mainly eat invertebrates but are known to include fruits in their diet. Their main prey are beetles, moths, spiders, flies and caterpillars. They will also feed on the ripe fruits of natives such as Coprosma. Feeding on fruits is especially common in the autumn.

Brown creepers are more likely to glean invertebrates from small branches and leaves in the canopy, though they do sometimes hang upside down from branches in order to forage for invertebrates. Though gleaning is the most common form of foraging for invertebrates, brown creepers will also feed on invertebrates under loose bark or on large branches. They will only rarely forage and feed on the ground preferring to forage more than 2 m off the ground. Birds will sometimes forage in their breeding pairs but more commonly tend to forage in flocks of 3-12 birds. These flocks usually include loose family groups, juveniles and occasionally other pairs when outside of the breeding season. Pairs will forage together in their territory during the breeding season.

It is also thought that sexual dimporhism in brown creeper, particularly beak size, reduces competition between individuals as a wider range of food is available to males which generally have larger beaks.

== Predators, parasites, and diseases ==
=== Parasites – long-tailed cuckoo ===
Brown creepers are one of the main hosts for the long-tailed cuckoo in the South Island and Stewart Island and can sometimes be seen feeding a much larger cuckoo chick during the summer months. Brown creepers have a high rate of rejection for long-tailed cuckoo eggs in their nests. This is due to the fact that brown creepers have an open nest as opposed to a closed or cavity nest. Having an open nest allows for more light to get in and increases the chance of the birds noticing a foreign egg. Despite all of this the long-tailed cuckoo is very host specific and chooses to mimic the eggs of brown creepers. Brown creepers have also been known to mob long-tailed cuckoos when they are present in spring and summer as a form of prevention. Mobbing is where individual birds produce warning calls, which the entire flock hears and responds to by surrounding the predator, with wings and tails erect whilst hopping between perches and calling until the predator moves away. Brown creepers have been observed mobbing cats, stoats, rats, larger birds, and even humans.

=== European settlement ===
Brown creeper numbers declined soon after European settlement due to the introduction of cats, rats and mustelids. The eggs and young of brown creepers are predated on mostly by stoats and black rats. Brown creeper number were also negatively affected by the loss of much of the important lowland forest. However, their current distribution seems to have stabilized.

Laughing owls have been extinct since the 1930s/40s. It has been shown through fossil records of their food deposits that they would have preyed on brown creepers.

== Other information ==
=== Use of UV light vision to recognize foreign eggs ===
There has been some research done that may indicate the use of UV wavelength light in brown creepers' ability to recognize long-tailed cuckoo eggs. Brown creepers are known to reject long-tailed cuckoo eggs whereas yellowheads and whiteheads, who are close relatives of brown creepers, tend not to. The research showed that both the brown creeper and yellowhead lacked a short-wavelength sensitive (SWS1) opsin gene which has large effects on the range of light that can be seen. This can influence how far in or out of the UV range an organism can see, which in terms of the Mohoua spp. (the Mohoua spp. is the family brown creepers belong to) will effect its ability to use colour cues to recognize foreign eggs from long-tailed cuckoos. The research did conclude with the fact that more behavioral research would be needed to gain a real understanding of the phenotype effects of these genome changes. This will explain why brown creeper reject long-tailed cuckoo eggs and other species do not.

=== Song dialect ===
Different brown creeper populations have different dialects meaning that, for example, a population on Stewart Island will have a slightly different song than a population at the foothills of Mount Cook. In a research project around the communicatory behaviour of the brown creeper, it was discovered that a male brown creeper would respond more significantly (i.e., sing louder) around the presence of an unknown bird with the same dialect, than to a bird he recognised (a bird from a neighbouring territory). This finding enhances the idea that brown creepers are territorial birds.

=== Pīpipi and humans ===
In the late 19th century when flocks of pīpipi were still abundant, they would occasionally descend on slaughteryards in sheep stations when food was short to feed on the meat of butchered animals.

== Works cited ==
- Checklist Committee, Ornithological Society of New Zealand (2022). Checklist of the Birds of New Zealand (PDF) (5th ed.). ISSN 2815-8121.
- Heather, B. D.; Robertson, H. A. (2015). The Field Guide to the Birds of New Zealand. Auckland, New Zealand: Penguin. ISBN 978-0-14-357092-9.
