= Papuan sittella =

Conservation status
- Least Concern (IUCN 3.1)

Scientific classification
- Kingdom: Animalia
- Phylum: Chordata
- Class: Aves
- Order: Passeriformes
- Family: Neosittidae
- Genus: Daphoenositta
- Species: D. papuensis

Binomial name
- Daphoenositta papuensis (Schlegel, 1871)

Species of bird

The Papuan sittella (Daphoenositta papuensis) is one of three species of bird in the family Neosittidae. It is native to elevated areas of New Guinea. The head of males is black while females' are white.

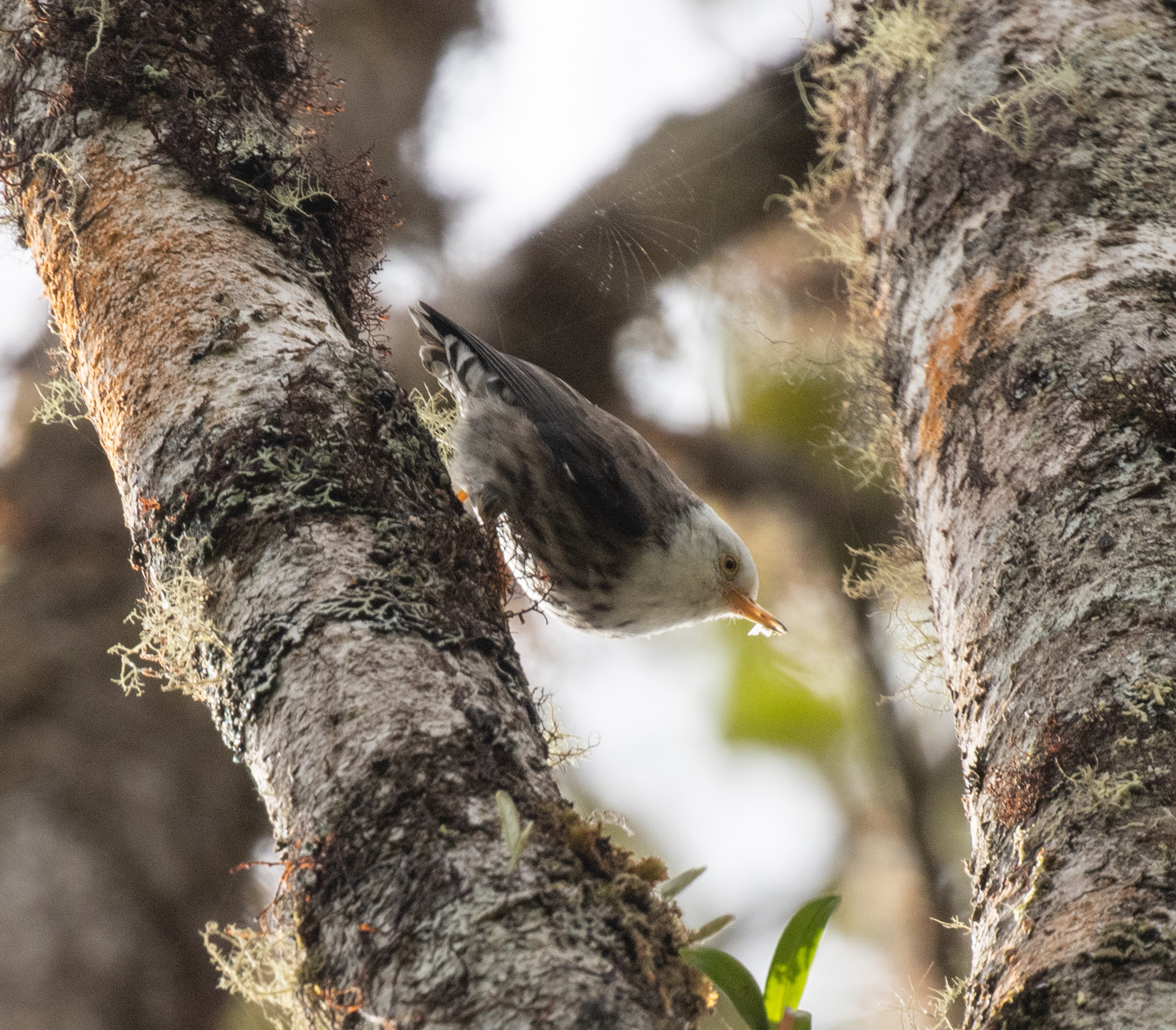
female bird
