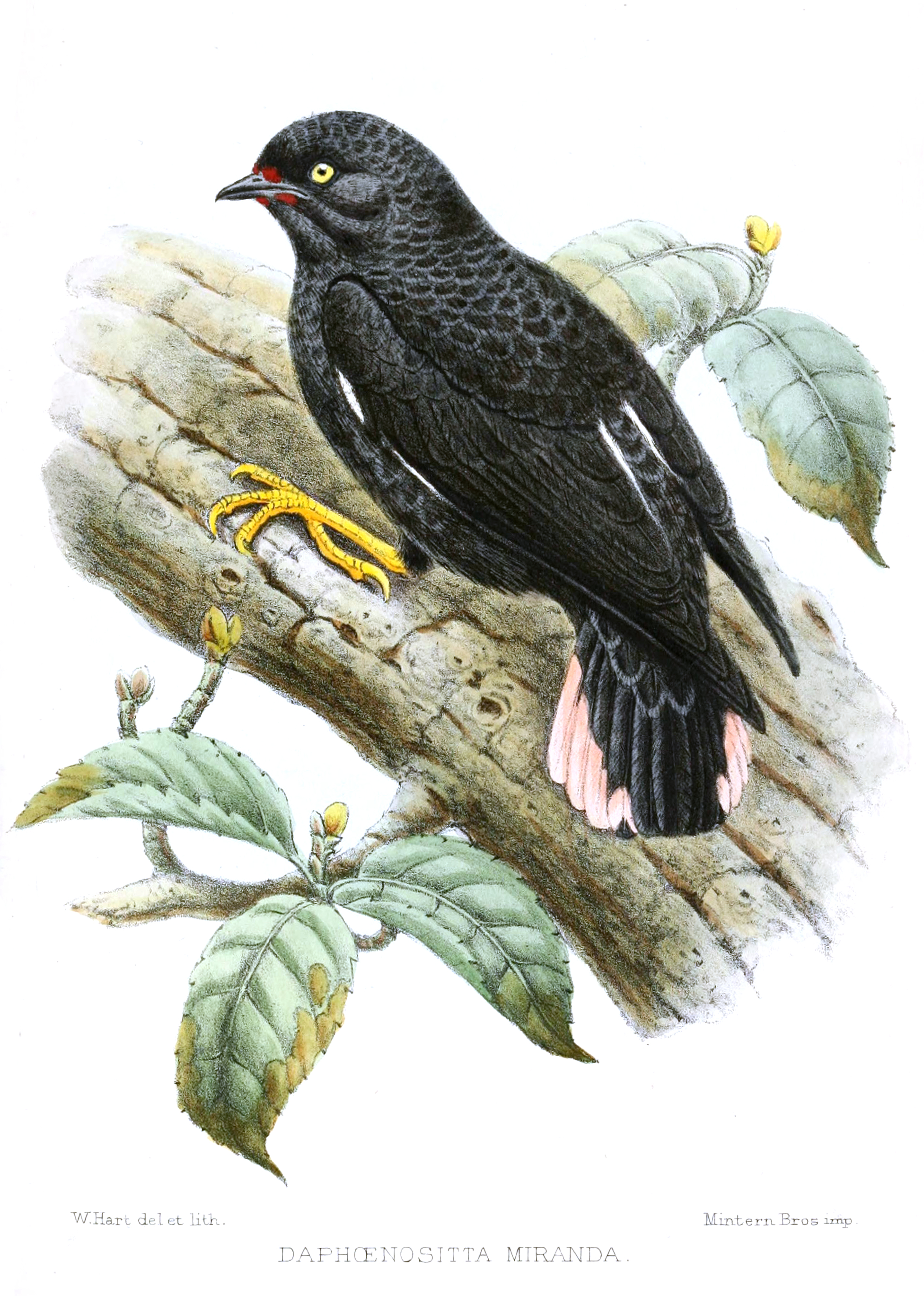

Conservation status
- Least Concern (IUCN 3.1)

Scientific classification
- Kingdom: Animalia
- Phylum: Chordata
- Class: Aves
- Order: Passeriformes
- Family: Neosittidae
- Genus: Daphoenositta
- Species: D. miranda

Binomial name
- Daphoenositta miranda De Vis, 1897

Synonyms
- Neositta miranda

= Black sittella =

Species of bird

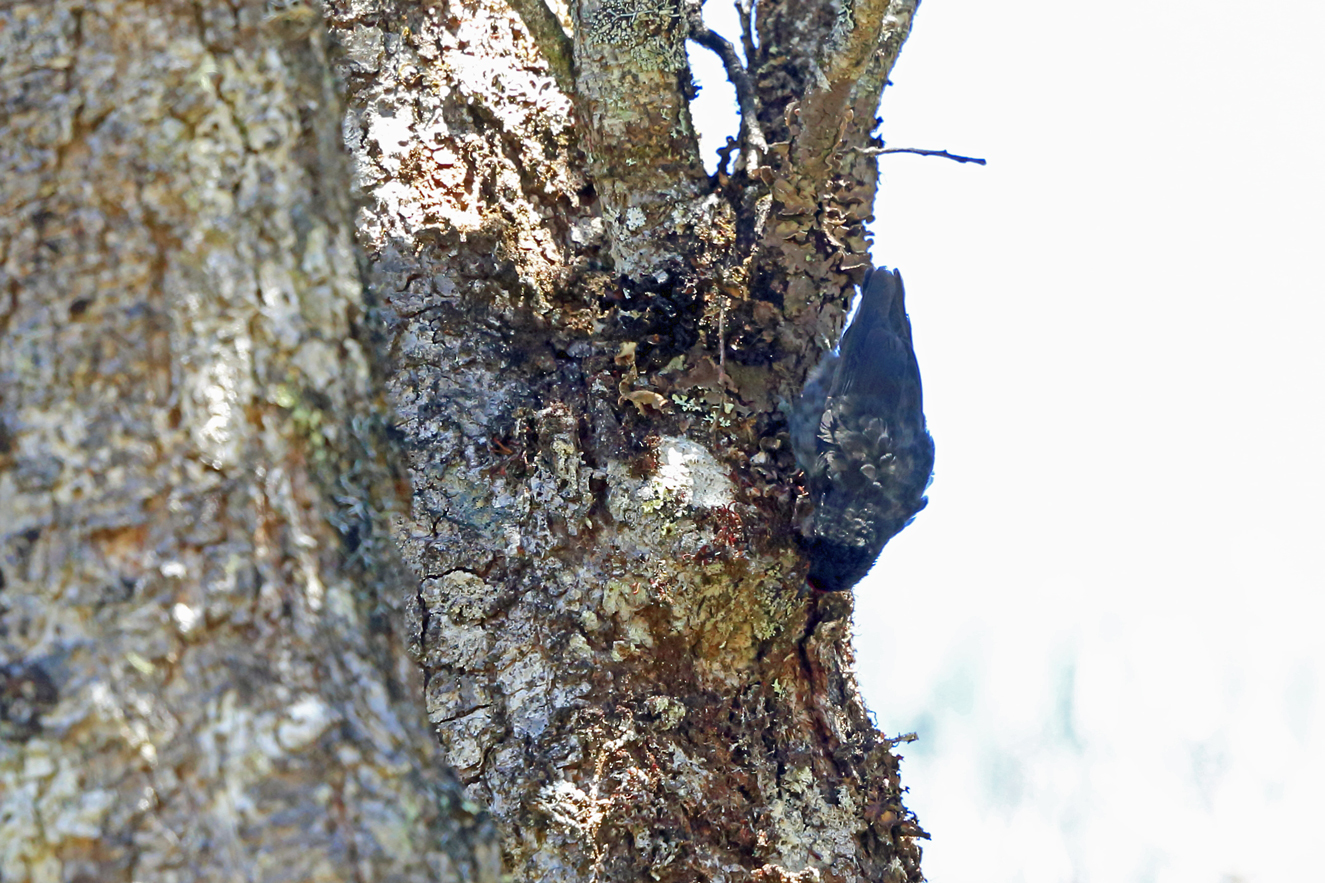
Live bird

The black sittella (Daphoenositta miranda) is one of two species of birds in the family Neosittidae. It is found in endemic to New Guinea, where it is found in the highlands.
