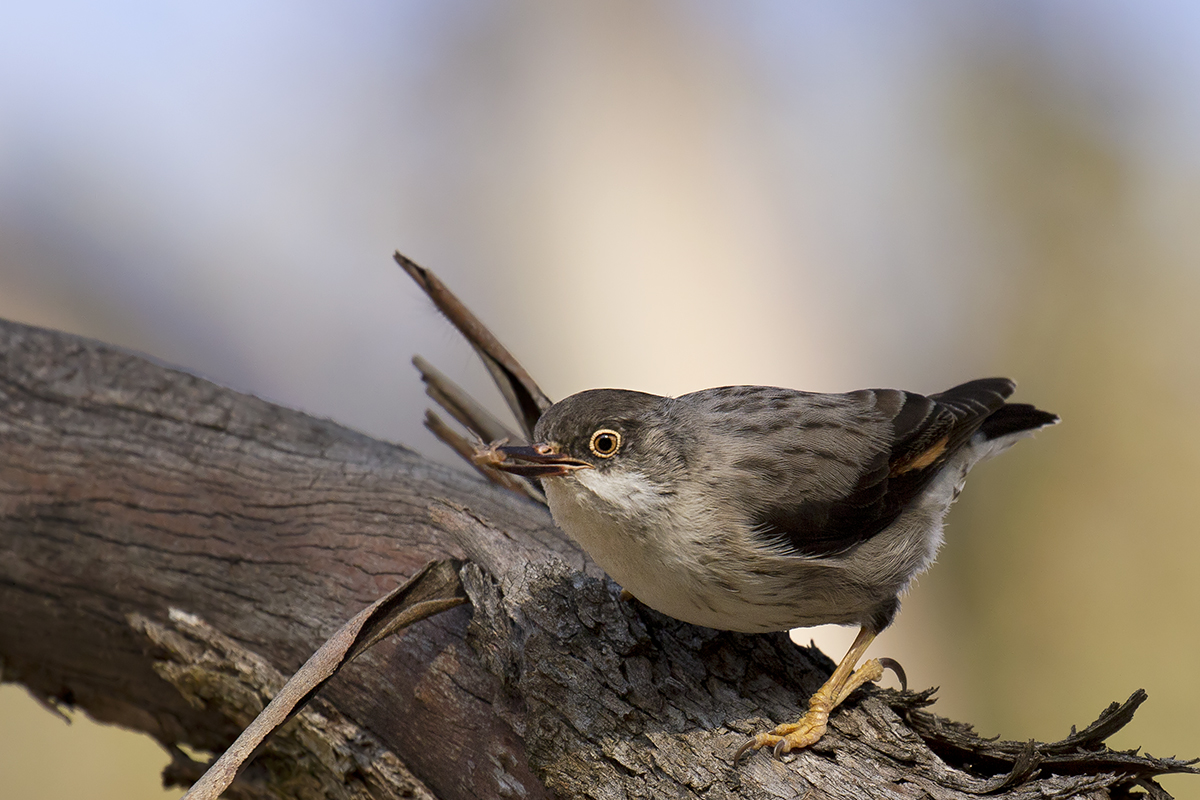

Conservation status
- Least Concern (IUCN 3.1)

Scientific classification
- Kingdom: Animalia
- Phylum: Chordata
- Class: Aves
- Order: Passeriformes
- Family: Neosittidae
- Genus: Daphoenositta
- Species: D. chrysoptera

Binomial name
- Daphoenositta chrysoptera (Latham, 1801)
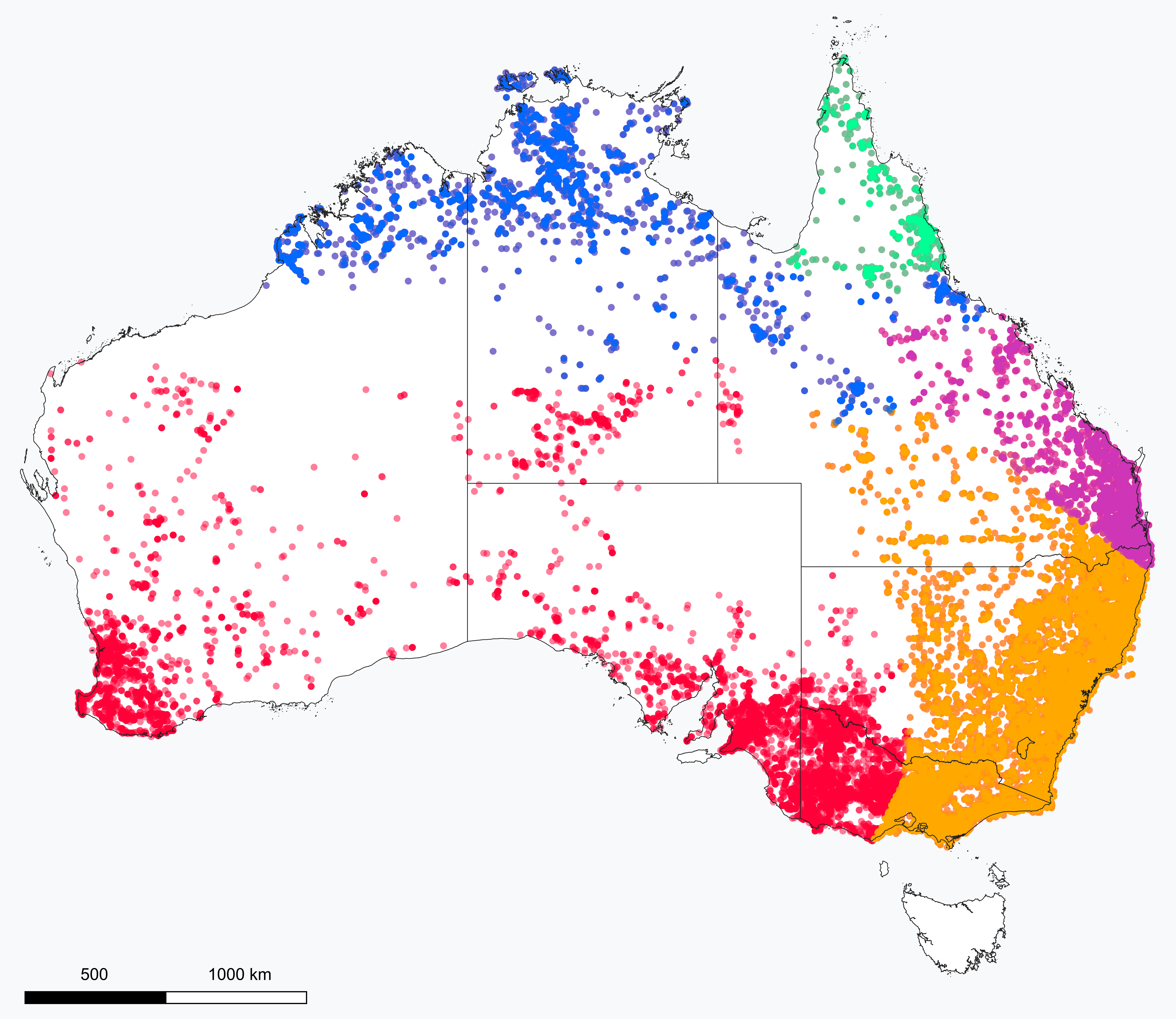
- Distribution of Daphoenositta chrysoptera subspecies: D. c. pileata (black-capped) D. c. chrysoptera (orange-winged) D. c. leucocephala (white-headed) D. c. striata (striated) D. c. leucoptera (white-winged)

Synonyms
- Neositta chrysoptera

= Varied sittella =

Species of bird

The varied sittella (Daphoenositta chrysoptera) is a small songbird native to Australia. About 10–11 cm long, it is also known as the Australian nuthatch, orange-winged sittella and the barkpecker.

== Taxonomy ==
The varied sittella was first described by the English ornithologist John Latham in 1801 under the binomial name Sitta chrysoptera. The generic name Daphoenositta is derived from Greek daphoinos/δαφοινός, 'blood-red, tawny' and sittē, a bird like a woodpecker mentioned by Aristotle. The specific name chrysoptera is from Greek khrusopteros/χρυσό-πτερος, 'golden-winged'.

The species inhabits a broad range, and its appearance changes depending on its location, hence the name varied sittella. There are five subspecies:

- D. c. leucoptera (Gould, 1840) - northwest to north-central Australia (white-winged sittella)
- D. c. striata (Gould, 1869) - northeast Australia (streaked sittella)
- D. c. leucocephala (Gould, 1838) - east Australia (white-headed sittella)
- D. c. chrysoptera (Latham, 1801) - southeast Australia (orange-winged sittella)
- D. c. pileata (Gould, 1838) - southwest, west-central, central and south Australia (black-capped sittella)

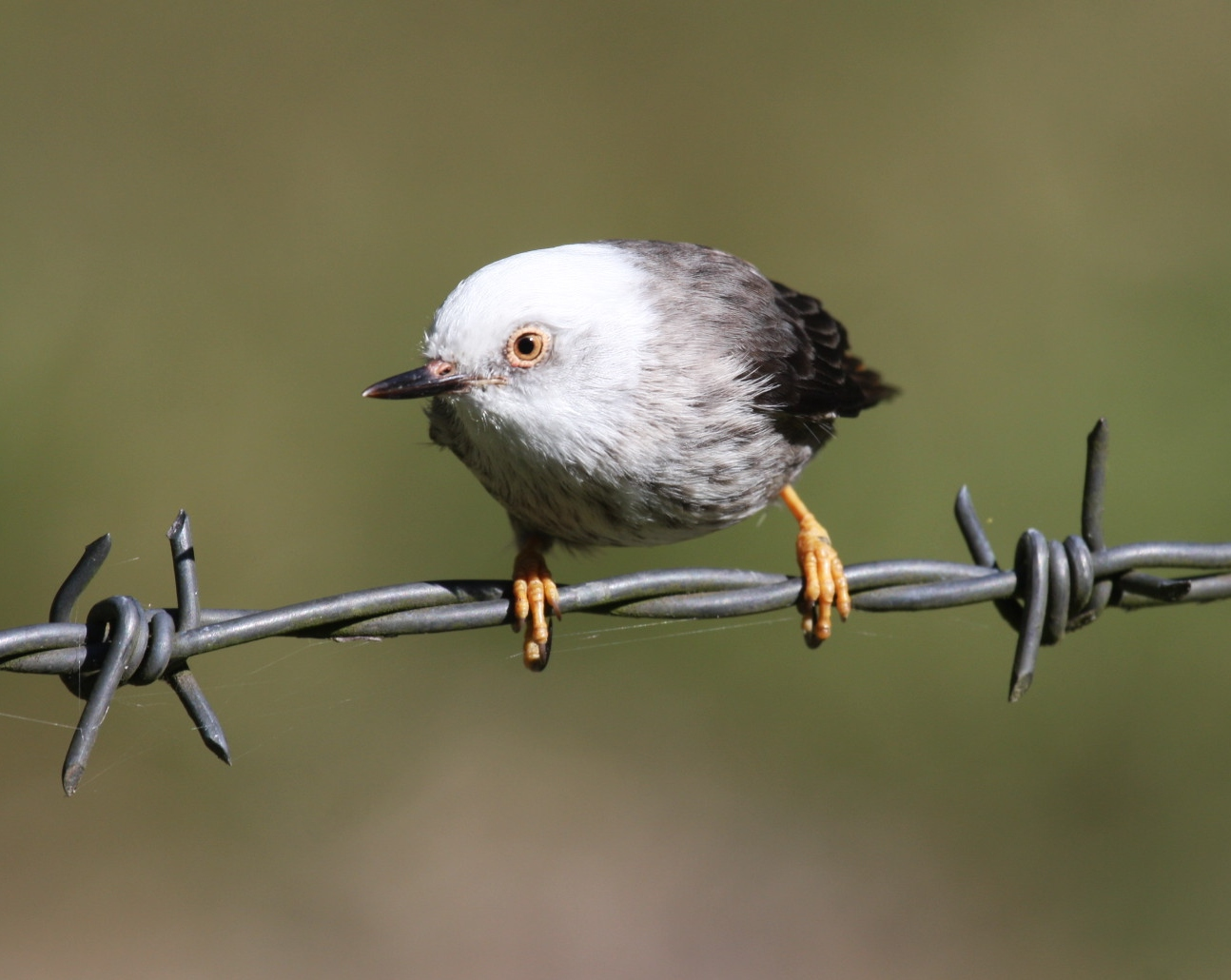
D. c. leucocephala Laceys Creek, SE Queensland

== Description ==
Its crown and head can be white, grey or black, and its body is either whitish or grey often streaked with black and grey. Its wings are black, with a broad bar in either white or cinnamon. The iris is dark orange, and the eye-ring, legs and feet are orange-yellow. The beak is orange with a black tip that can extend as far as the base. Colouration completely depends on the subspecies, and certain subspecies are known to hybridize. In the future, some subspecies may become species in their own right.

== Behaviour ==
Flocks of the birds forage in trees of all heights, often descending erratically down the trunks in a rather nuthatch-like fashion. Their diet consists of spiders and insects, usually prised from beneath the bark.

Calls are a thin, high-pitched chwit becoming the louder, metallic tchweit-tchweit-tchweit of many birds combining in a constant call-and-response as they move towards another tree.

In spring and summer (August to October in the north; September to December in the south), larger flocks break up into smaller breeding flocks, typically composed of a breeding pair, along with several unmated adults and immatures from the previous season. The nest is cone-shaped, made of bark, fibres and spider-webs, and placed 5 to 25 m above ground in the fork of a branch or on an exposed limb. A clutch of two or three blue-spotted, white eggs, measuring 17 mm × 13 mm (0.7 in × 0.5 in), is incubated by the female for 18 to 20 days.

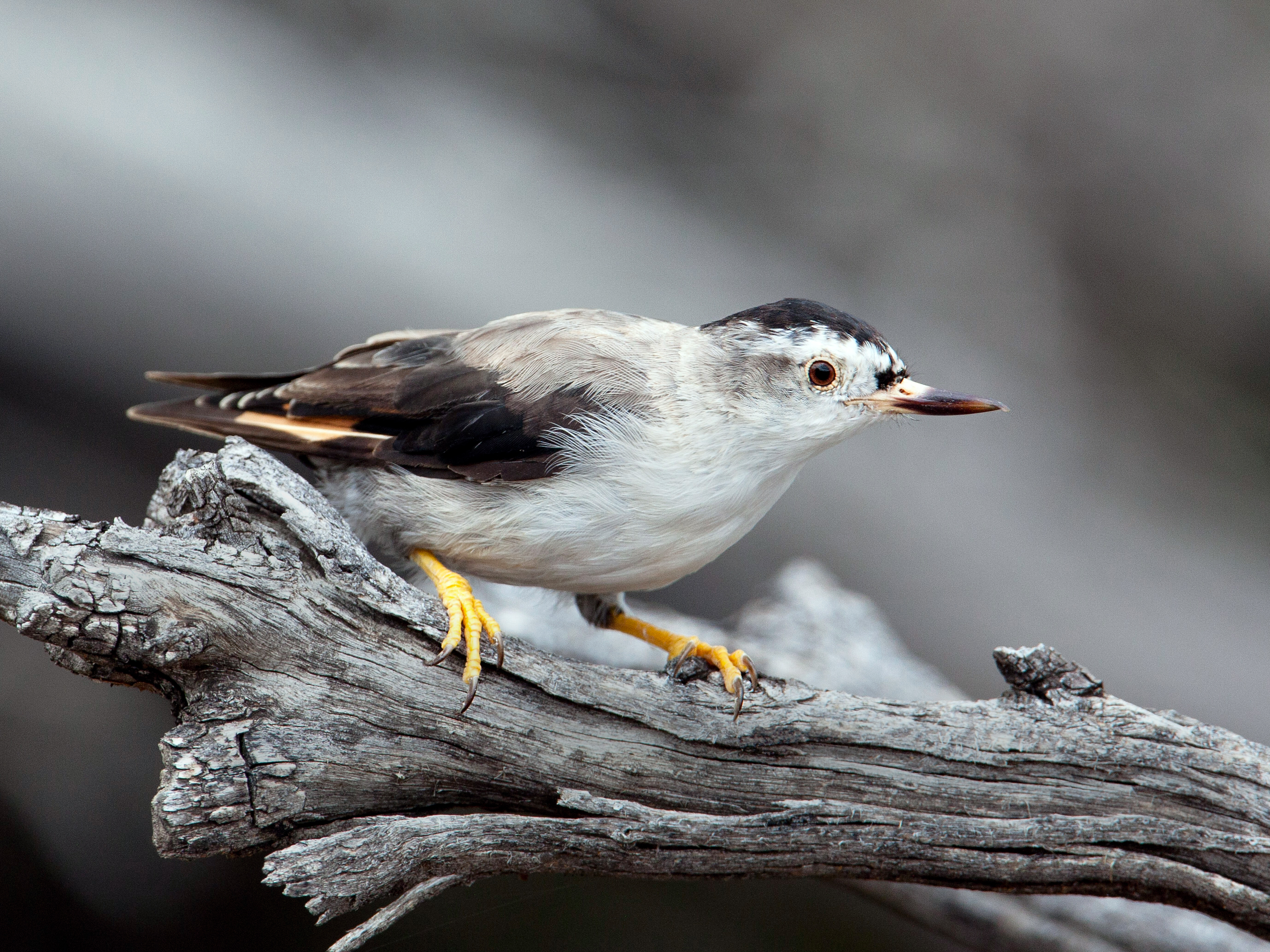
D. c. pileata (male)

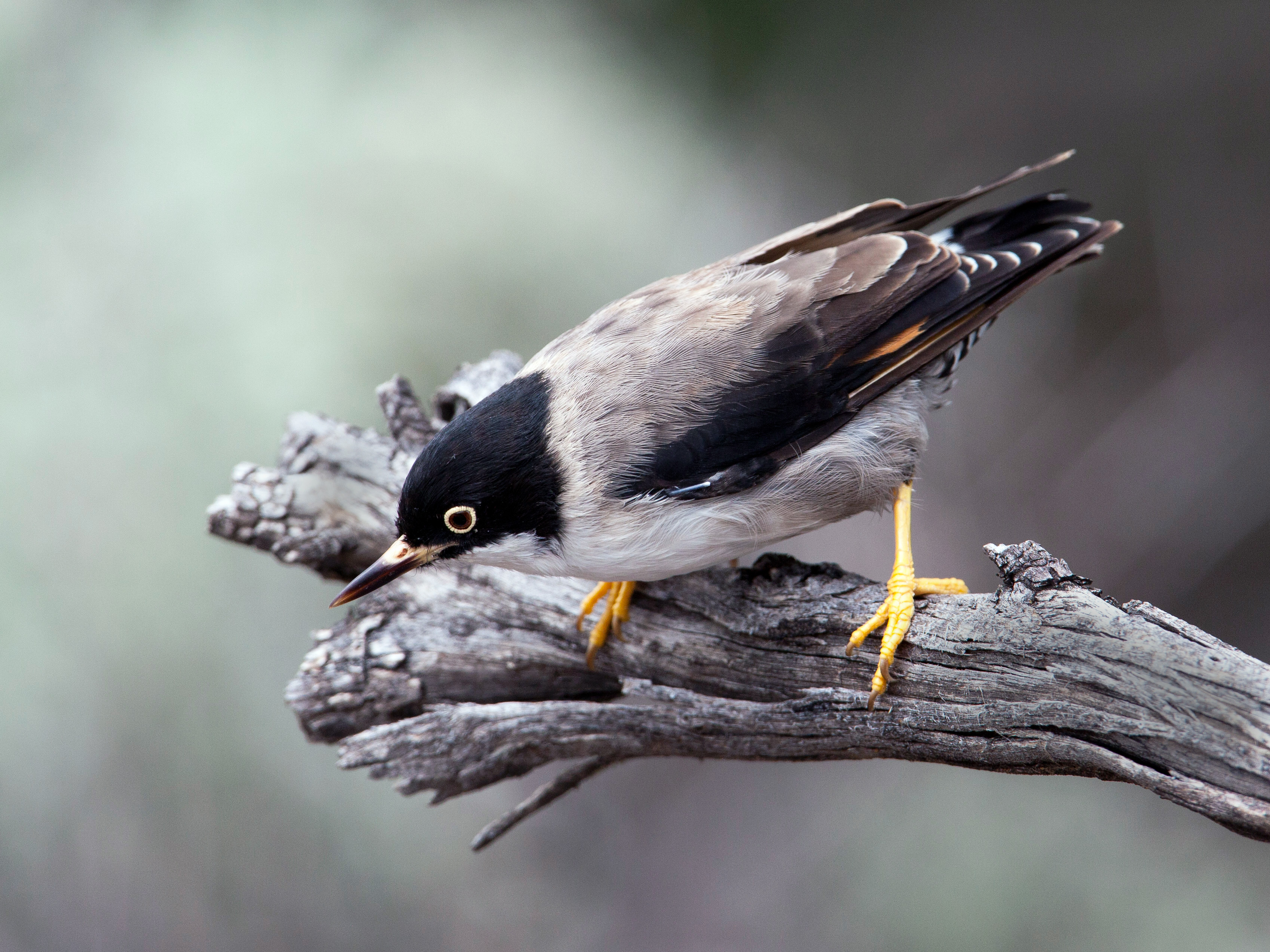
D. c. pileata (female)

== Other sources ==
- Simpson, K. & Day, N. (1993) Field Guide to the Birds of Australia (ISBN 0-670-90478-3)
- del Hoyo, J.; Elliot, A. & Christie D. (editors). (2007). Handbook of the Birds of the World. Volume 12: Picathartes to Tits and Chickadees. Lynx Edicions. ISBN 978-84-96553-42-2
