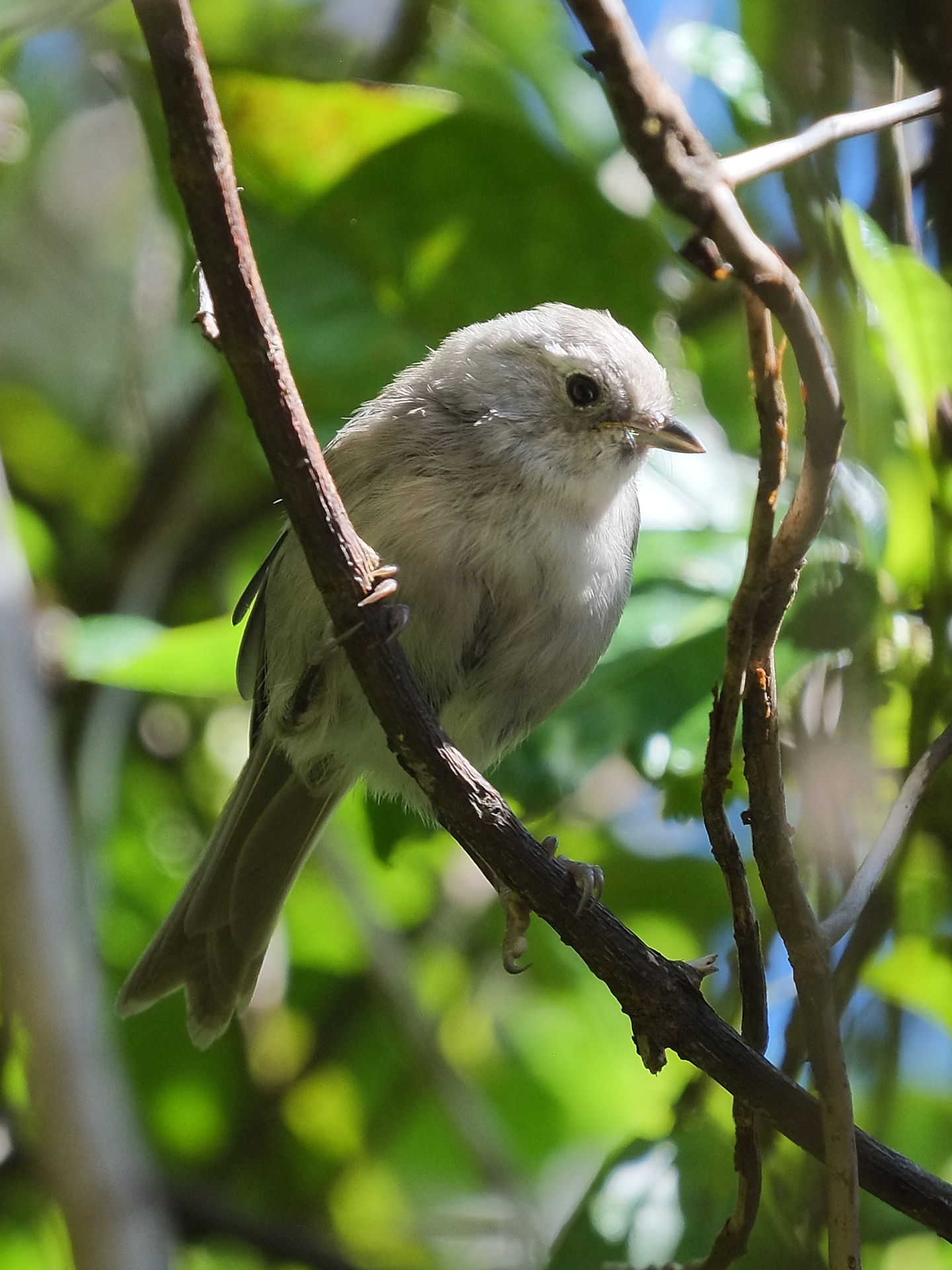

Conservation status
- Least Concern (IUCN 3.1)

Scientific classification
- Kingdom: Animalia
- Phylum: Chordata
- Class: Aves
- Order: Passeriformes
- Family: Mohouidae
- Genus: Mohoua
- Species: M. albicilla

Binomial name
- Mohoua albicilla (Lesson, 1830)

= Whitehead (bird) =

Species of bird endemic to New Zealand

The whitehead (Mohoua albicilla; Māori: pōpokotea) is a species of small (15 cm in length, 18.5/14.5 g.) passerine bird endemic to New Zealand. It is classified in the family Mohouidae. The male whitehead's upperparts, wings and tail are a pale brown in colour, while the head and underparts are white – in the case of the male an almost pure white in colour. Females and juveniles have similar colouration except that the nape and crown (top of the head) are shaded brown. The black beak and eyes contrast with the white head and the feet are bluish black in colouration.

Formerly quite common and widespread in native forests in the North Island, the whitehead has suffered a marked decline in the past two centuries since European colonisation and today it is restricted to a fraction of its former range. Historically, deforestation has destroyed large areas of habitat for this species but today the greatest threat is from predation by invasive mammalian species such as rats and stoats. It has been the subject of an active conservation campaign and has been successfully reintroduced into reserves near Auckland and Wellington respectively. In the past whiteheads held a special place in Māori culture. As well as the species appearing in many legends, whiteheads were viewed by Māori to have roles as messengers of the gods and as fortune tellers or seers – and because of these beliefs, live birds were caught and used in several different kinds of ceremonial rites.

== Habitat and distribution ==
The range of this species has always been restricted to the North Island of New Zealand, as well as several offshore islands surrounding it, including Little Barrier Island (where it is the most common forest bird), Great Barrier Island and Kapiti Island. It has however, contracted markedly since the 19th century due to a number of human induced factors (see the Conservation section below). The distributions of the whitehead and its closest relative the yellowhead (Mohoua ochrocephala) are allopatric, with the range of the yellowhead being restricted to the South Island. Whiteheads are generally restricted to the larger tracts of older scrub and native forest that remain in the North Island but have proven their adaptability by establishing populations in a number of exotic pine plantations, particularly on the North Island Volcanic Plateau.

== Ecology and behaviour ==
Whiteheads live in flocks, generally a family group.

=== Feeding ===
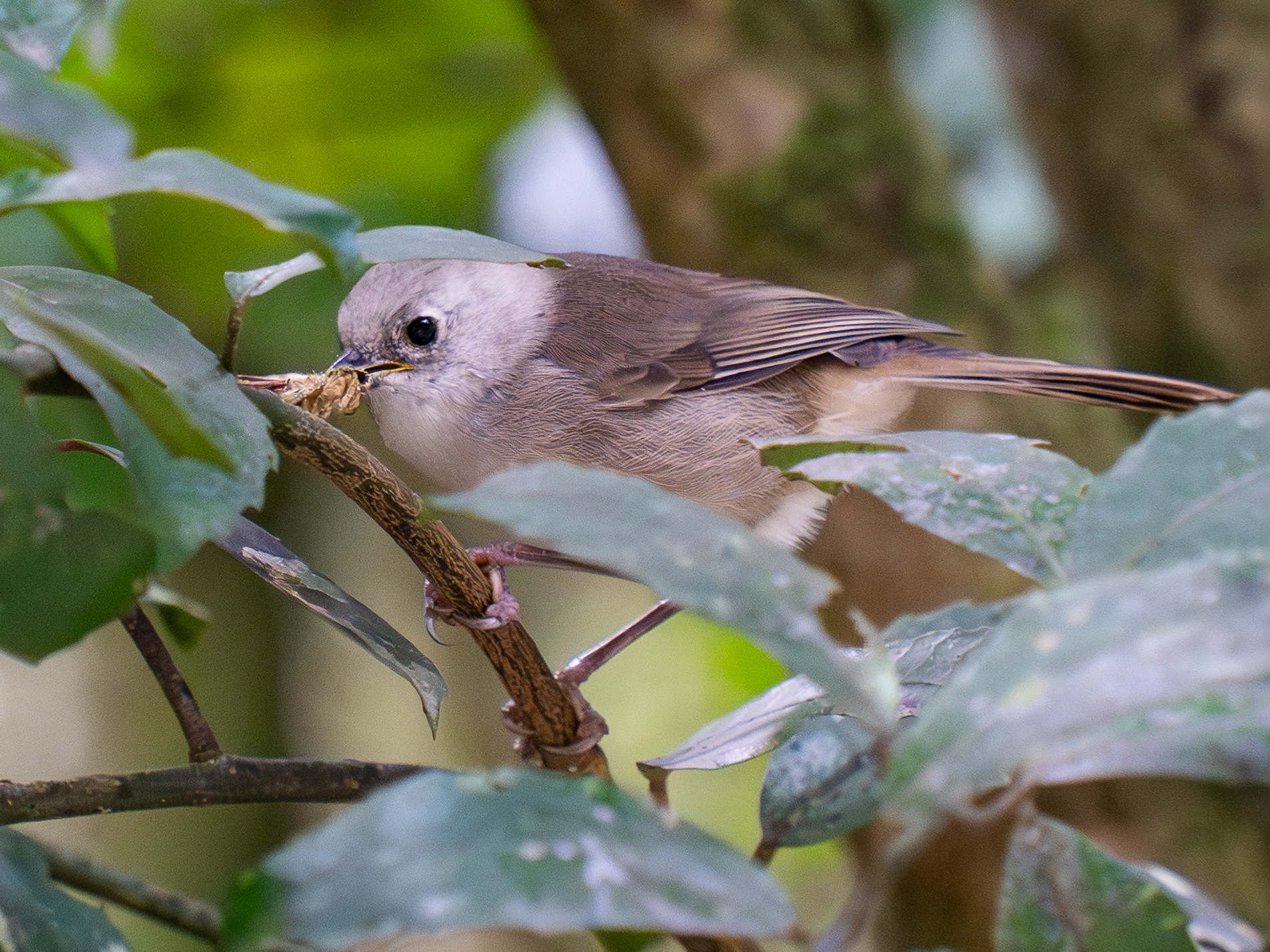
A pōpokotea with a moth

The diet is primarily insectivorous in nature – they are classified as arboreal insectivores. Their main prey are spiders, moths, caterpillars and beetles, which are gleaned from tree trunks, leaves and branches in the canopy and subcanopy. They rarely feed on the forest floor. They supplement their predominantly insectivorous diet with the fruits of native plants such as māhoe and matipo and, like the yellowhead, they frequently hang upside down from branches or twigs while feeding. Whiteheads often form mixed-species feeding flocks with saddlebacks, kākāriki or silvereyes to catch the insects these birds dislodge as they feed.

=== Reproduction ===
Unlike the yellowhead, which nests only in the cavities of tree trunks which are generally high up in the canopy, the whitehead builds a more conventional cup shaped nest at a height between 1 and 15 metres above the ground; either in the canopy of the forest or lower down in smaller trees or shrubs. Between 2–4 eggs of variable colouration are laid, the incubation period is generally around 18 days and fledging takes a further 16–19, the chicks being fed by both parents. In November and December, the long-tailed cuckoo (Urodynamis taitensis) frequently acts as a brood parasite for nesting whiteheads by pushing their eggs out of the nest and laying a single egg of its own in their place

=== Lifespan ===
The whitehead has an expected lifespan of five years in protected areas such as Little Barrier Island. The oldest known whitehead had an age of at least 16 years, having been banded in January 1985 and observed in 2001.

== Whiteheads and humans ==
=== In Māori culture, legends and ceremonial rites ===
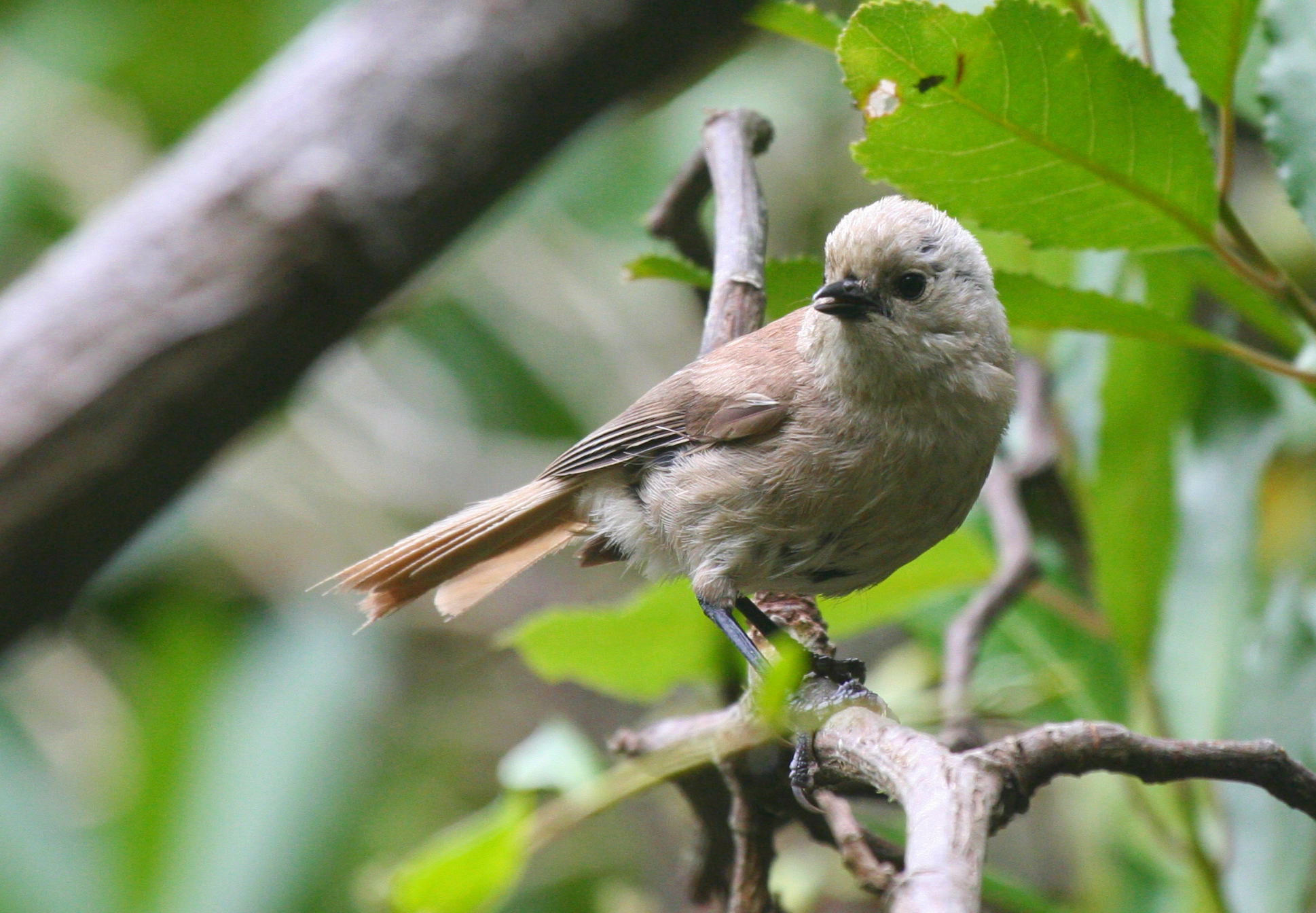
Whitehead, Mohoua albicilla

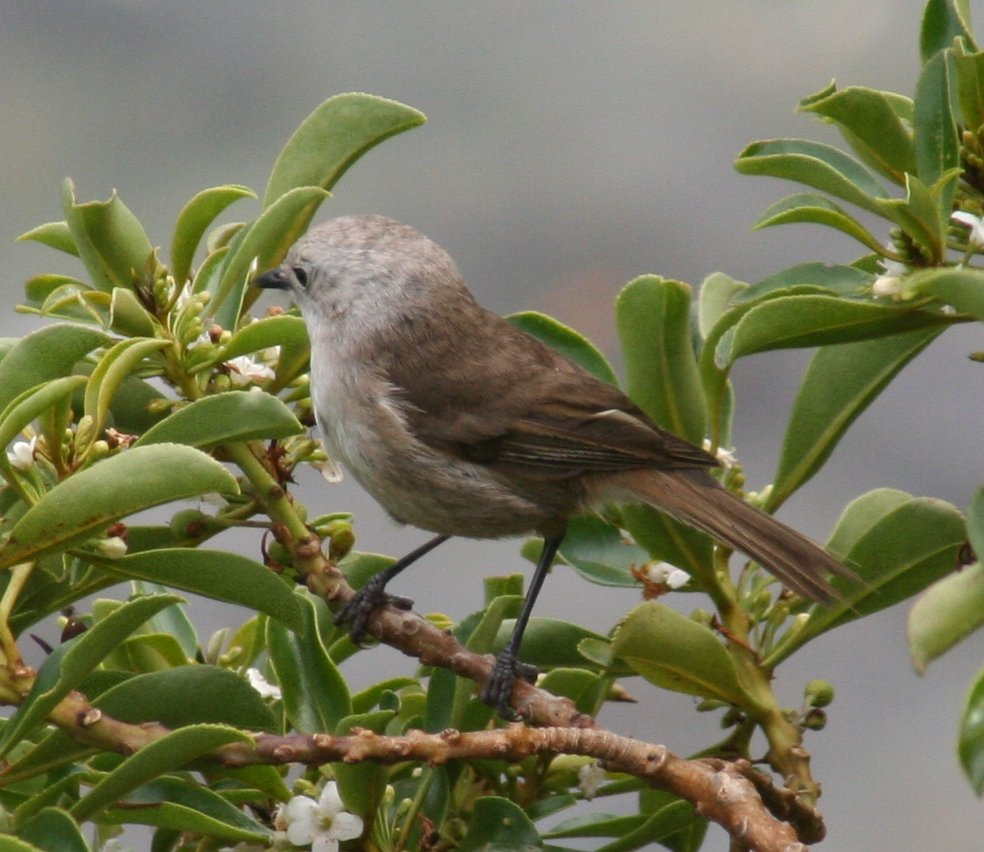
Whitehead on Tiritiri Matangi Island

In times past, the whitehead held a special place within Māori culture among the forest birds of New Zealand. They featured not only in Māori folklore and legends but also in a number of rites for which live individuals were captured. Flocks of whiteheads form part of the hākuturi, a multitude of small birds sometimes called Te Tini o te Hākuturi – "The myriads of Hākuturi", the spirit guardians of the forest. In a Ngāti Mahuta story, the culture hero Rata went into the forest and cut down a tree to make a canoe, but failed to perform the proper placatory rites to Tāne, god of the forest. Whiteheads and riflemen whistled shrilly at him in admonishment and gathered together the pieces of the tree until it stood whole again. This happened several times until Rata showed remorse and the birds felled the tree and made the canoe for him. In some stories, the whitehead was one of several small birds chosen by Māui to accompany him in his (ultimately unsuccessful and fatal) quest to abolish death by killing Hine-nui-te-pō, the goddess of night and death. The mobbing behaviour sometimes seen in whiteheads is reflected in one legend which tells of swarms of whiteheads scratching out the eyes of Whaitiri, goddess of thunder, as they pass her house, thus causing her to go blind.

The whitehead, as a messenger between man and the gods, was a very tapu (sacred) bird. This status was reflected in its role in the tohi rite, a ritual performed over an infant. This entailed a tohunga touching the head of an infant with a live whitehead and reciting a karakia (incantation) firstly to cause the mana (power and prestige) of the gods to descend on the child from the gods and secondly to open the child's eyes and ears to the knowledge of the ancestors. After the karakia was complete the bird was freed to demonstrate that the mana received would return to the gods when the child died. The whitehead also held this role as a messenger to the gods when a new pā (fortified village) was dedicated. Once the ceremonies were complete a single whitehead was released unharmed, the pā became free of tapu, and could be safely entered. The purpose of this rite was to bring prosperity and vitality to the pā and its people in times of war and peace. When a candidate was applying to a senior tohunga to become a matakite, or seer, he had first to catch a small bird such as a whitehead. After more ritual the applicant was shut in a hut to sleep with the bird for a night. Next morning he opened the door and if the bird flew away of its own accord, his suitability to be a seer, as indeed the whitehead was regarded to be, was confirmed. In the past, the appearance of a flock of whiteheads was interpreted by Māori from the upper regions of the Whanganui River as a sign that kēhua (ghosts) were nearby.

=== In general New Zealand culture ===
19th-century forestry workers (bushmen) regarded the whitehead as a useful forecaster of the weather: "They kept up a lively chirping some hours before an approaching storm. It was a warning which the bushmen never allowed to pass unnoticed". Colonists called this bird "Joey whitehead" for its distinctive head colouration. This is the origin of the English-language name of the bird.

=== Threats and conservation ===
Subfossil remains of whiteheads have been found on the North Island and the species was still very widespread when European settlement of New Zealand began in the 1840s. However, soon after, they began to decline as a result of both the widespread clearance of lowland forests for agriculture and the predation by several species of mammalian predators introduced by Europeans, including several species of rodents and mustelids. Such introduced species remain a problem for many whitehead populations today, as they both compete with them for food and prey upon the birds themselves. As a result, the species has experienced local extinctions of many of its populations throughout the North Island, particularly in its northern regions; whiteheads disappeared from Northland in the 1870s and from the greater Auckland area in the 1880s. They also disappeared from Great Barrier Island in the 1950s.

In an effort to restore this species to its former range, a number of conservation reintroductions have been carried out in the last twenty years. All these reintroductions were carried out as part of wider efforts towards eco-restoration at each of the native forest sites concerned.

Release location	Birds sourced from	Number of whiteheads released	Date(s) of release	Population successfully established?
Mana Island	Kapiti Island	38	20 July 2010	Uncertain
Waitākere Ranges	Tiritiri Matangi Island	55	August 2004	Uncertain
Hunua Ranges	Tiritiri Matangi Island	40	April 2003	Yes
Karori Wildlife Sanctuary	Kapiti Island	63	2001–2002	Yes
Tiritiri Matangi Island	Little Barrier Island	80	1989–1990	Yes

Due to the northern North Island local extinctions, whiteheads were, until recently, extinct on the mainland of the North Island north of about Hamilton. However, this situation has been rectified by three of the above releases in the Hunua Ranges, Waitākere Ranges and on Tiritiri Matangi Island. The Karori and Tiritiri Matangi reintroductions were done independently while the Hunua reintroduction was an Auckland Regional Council initiative. The Auckland Regional Council also played a part in the Waitākere Ranges Ark in the Park project release – the project is a joint effort being a joint effort between this local government body and the NZ conservation not for profit NGO Forest and Bird.

== See also ==
- List of New Zealand birds
