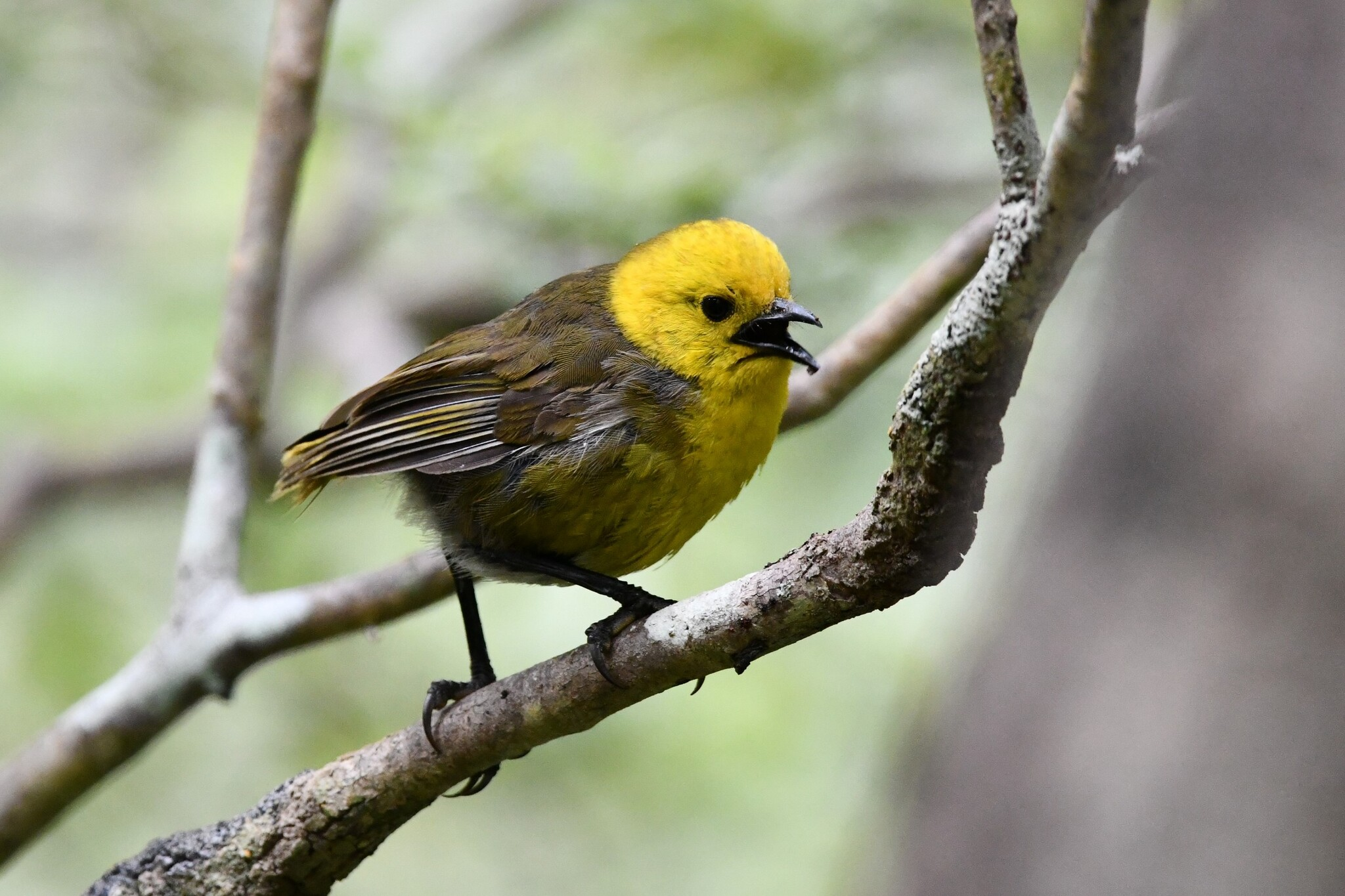
- Yellowhead or mohua

Conservation status
- Near Threatened (IUCN 3.1)

Scientific classification
- Kingdom: Animalia
- Phylum: Chordata
- Class: Aves
- Order: Passeriformes
- Family: Mohouidae
- Genus: Mohoua
- Species: M. ochrocephala

Binomial name
- Mohoua ochrocephala (Gmelin, JF, 1789)

= Yellowhead (bird) =

Species of New Zealand native bird

The yellowhead or mohua (Mohoua ochrocephala) is a small insectivorous passerine bird endemic to the South Island of New Zealand. Once a common forest bird, its numbers declined drastically after the introduction of rats and stoats, and its IUCN conservation status is now near threatened.

== Taxonomy ==
The yellowhead was formally described in 1789 by the German naturalist Johann Friedrich Gmelin in his revised and expanded edition of Carl Linnaeus's Systema Naturae. He placed it with the flycatchers in the genus Muscicapa and coined the binomial name Muscicapa ochrocephala. The specific epithet is derived from the Ancient Greek ōkhros meaning "pale yellow" and -kephalos meaning "-headed". Gmelin based his account on the "yellow-headed fly-catcher" that had been described in 1783 by the English ornithologist John Latham in his book A General Synopsis of Birds. The naturalist Joseph Banks had provided Latham with a watercolour painting of the bird by Georg Forster who had accompanied James Cook on his second voyage to the Pacific Ocean. The inscription on the painting includes the year 1774 and the location "Queen Charlotte's Sound". Queen Charlotte Sound is on the north coast of the South Island of New Zealand. This picture is the holotype for the species and is in the collection of the Natural History Museum in London. The yellowhead is now one of three species placed in the genus Mohoua that was introduced in 1837 by the French naturalist René Lesson. The species is monotypic: no subspecies are recognised.

The yellowhead was known in the 19th century as the "bush canary", after its trilling song. It is also known as mohua from the Māori mōhoua. Recent classification places this species and its closest relative, the whitehead, in the family Mohouidae.

== Distribution and habitat ==
The yellowhead is found only on the South Island and several small islands surrounding it. Although abundant in the 19th century, particularly in southern beech forests on the South Island and Stewart Island / Rakiura, mohua declined dramatically in the early 20th century due to the introduction of black rats and mustelids; nesting in tree holes makes them more vulnerable to predators.

Today they have vanished from almost all of the South Island's forests and exist in less than 5% of their original range. On mainland South Island there is currently a small population of mohua in the Marlborough Sounds and around Arthur's Pass, but a quarter of the population lives in the beech forests of the Catlins. The mohua number about 5000.

== Behaviour and ecology ==
=== Foraging ===
Mohua spends approximately three-quarters of their time foraging. The proportion of time used in foraging is highest during the premoult period and is lowest during the incubation period. In wild conditions, caterpillars (Lepidoptera larvae) were the predominant food. In captivity, mohua were observed to prefer mealworms (Tenebrio molitor larvae) over other foods. However, due to mealworms' limited vitamin A and D content, a vitamin A deficiency in captive mohua was common. Although mohua are insectivores, they have been observed to be opportunists who can eat various food items, including nuts and dried fruits. Foraging in captivity was mainly done between ground level and the shrub layer. This differed from the foraging behaviour observed in wild conditions, where mohua spent over 99% of the time foraging exclusively in the shrub and canopy layers of the forest, so they avoided feeding at ground level. Under both conditions, gleaning was the preferred foraging method despite foraging in different parts of the forest. Foraging behaviour differed in the podocarp forest on Ulva Island, and although gleaning was one of the main foraging methods, ripping was more common in the middle of spring (October). This correlated with greater foraging on the trunk and large branches of forest trees as opposed to the twigs, foliage and small branches during October. Twigs, foliage and small branches were generally preferred for foraging outside October. Rimu and miro were the main foraging surfaces for mohua in the Ulva Island forest but were preferred at different rates depending on the time of year. Rimu and Miro were equally preferred during the spring months of October and November, while Rimu was preferred over Miro during the summer months of December and January. However, during the November and December periods, mohua prefer a greater variety of species to forage from, including Rātā and Muttonbird Scrub. The foraging behaviour of mohua differs between podocarp and beech forests, as there is a greater dependence on foliage for scanning and foraging in both red and mountain beech forests. In both red and mountain beech forests, the trucks in the upper shrub layer were foraged from equally to the foliage, but in the upper canopy, the foliage was almost used exclusively, and the truck was not foraged from at all. red and mountain beech differ in foraging use in the lower canopy because, in red beech forests, the foliage and other surfaces such as the trunk, small branches, large branches and dead wood are all readily foraged from by mohua, while in mountain beech forests, the main surface used was the foliage. However, other surfaces were also foraged from. Like the podocarp forests of Ulva Island, ripping in beech forests was a common foraging method mainly due to mohua foraging on standing dead beech tree trunks.

=== Reproduction and Incubation ===
Mohua are cooperative breeders, which is not currently beneficial for their population growth as there are fewer breeding pairs than there could be, resulting in fewer offspring overall. However, this behaviour is an evolutionary adaptation to the lack of resources, which is beneficial if there is an abundance of mohua. Mohua cooperate by having a primary pair that breeds and is assisted by subordinate mohua called secondaries. Not all mohua pairs have secondaries. Secondaries can form their own pairs and some breed, although they are generally less successful in producing fledglings than the primary pair. The secondary pairs were in the territory of the primary pair, so they provided assistance when mobbing intruders, foraged together with the primary pair and assisted with territorial singing, while secondary helpers were actively feeding the nestlings, assisting with incubation and exhibiting territorial behaviour. The male secondary helpers mainly assisted with territorial singing, while the female secondary helpers could not sing but could assist with incubation. The secondary helpers did not necessarily have to be related to the primary pair. However, these were generally males who became the primary male in the territory if the previous primary male had disappeared before the next breeding season. Only male mohua sang and defended their territory against males from neighbouring territories with singing duels. The primary males also chased other mohua who were intruders or secondaries. The female mohua were exclusively responsible for the building of nests and the incubation of the eggs. However, the male guarded the female during this period and fed her while she was incubating. Mohua are hole-nesting birds, meaning they build their nests within tree cavities. Like other birds, mohua weave cup-shaped nests using soft materials such as moss, grass, filmy ferns and lichens. Mohua nesting holes are always found on large, old trees and anywhere from 1.7 m to over 31 m in the tree's cavities. The tree cavities used were mainly on the trunk, but dead branches with rotten wood were also utilised. Knot holes on tree trunks were the preferred place for mohua to build their nests. Mohua produces clutches of 1 to 5 eggs and can produce a second clutch if the female has enough food. If the female mohua does not get enough food, the breeding season will be short and late. When the primary female laid a second clutch, the chicks were fed by the primary male and the secondaries, while the female dedicated her time to incubating the new clutch. This is beneficial for the fledglings' survival as they could have more food and, therefore, energy to survive and grow. Mohua breeding differs, causing incubation times to range from October to December.

=== Movement ===
Flocks of up to 25 mohua can occur from January as this is outside their incubation times, so they are not territorial during these times. These flocks can sometimes consist of many mohua families, which causes the flocks to be louder overall. The movement of these flocks attract other bird species to follow mohua as they forage in similar areas for similar foods. The other bird species that flock and forage with mohua are the yellow and red-crowned parakeets, orange-fronted parakeets, fantail, tomtits, brown creepers, grey warblers, silvereyes and bellbirds. All of these species have similarities to the mohua in various ways, such as the parakeets, which are also hole-nesting birds; the brown creepers are in the same genus as the mohua and have certain sympatric distributions spanning the South Island; and the rest of the birds are all New Zealand native passerine forest birds that are small to medium-sized which makes sense as to why these birds have similar foraging habits. This multi-species flocking technique will likely help with more effective foraging as more individual birds can spot abundant prey. Mohua leads these flocks past bodies of water and through valleys to forage, allowing for distances of over 100 ha to be foraged from, which is much greater than during territorial times where the distances range up to 7 ha.

== Conservation ==
In New Zealand, mohua have the status of a protected threatened endemic species. Conservation efforts are being made to ensure its survival and mohua populations have been established on several predator-free offshore islands, such as Breaksea Island in Fiordland and Ulva Island. Birds have been captive-bred at Orana Park in Christchurch.

The behaviour of mohua can, in some cases, assist with the species' success or cause its demise, depending on the species it interacts with. Long-tailed cuckoos parasitise mohua nests by laying their eggs within mohua inhabited tree hole nests. After hatching, the young cuckoos will attempt to push the mohua chicks out of the nest but have a lower chance of success in these tree hole nests as compared to typical nests as the sides of the nests are generally supported by the edges of the tree hole causing the mohua chicks to survive. Another way tree hole nests benefit mohua is that the openings to these knot tree holes which mohua chooses to nest in are usually too small for the adult long-tailed cuckoo to enter. Adult long-tailed cuckoos also remove the eggs and nestlings from mohua nests if they cannot fit in the tree hole and lay their eggs. This tree hole nesting strategy prevents the predation of mohua by long-tailed cuckoos and other carnivorous birds such as the falcons and morepork. Although cuckoos affect mohua success in producing offspring, they are generally less effective against mohua than other parasitised bird species. The conservation problem with mohua behaviour arises when speaking about invasive mammalian predators, which the mohua are not adapted to compared to non-native bird species. Mohua are susceptible to predation by stoats and ship rats because mohua nest in tree holes, which does not allow for a quick escape if a predator were to enter the tree hole. The effects of predation on mohua by these mammals generally depend on the forest condition. This is because when it is a mast year in a beech tree forest, the mast causes mice populations to grow, which means more food for stoats, causing an increase in stoat population. This increase in stoat population is dangerous for all possible prey species in that forest because after preying on the mice, the stoats are still in high quantities and can easily shift their predation efforts onto native forest birds that live in these beech forests, such as mohua. Since female mohua must remain on the eggs for most of the incubation period and are the only ones that do incubate, this leaves them as the primary target for predation as it has little chance of survival after the stoat has entered the tree hole. With the lack of female mohua and nestlings, which are also preyed upon, the following breeding season will have reduced breeding pairs, so this singular predation event will make it difficult for the mohua population to recover. These behaviours that mohua exhibit effectively avoid predation by avian predators but make them susceptible to mammalian predators that they had not evolved around.

In 2003, 39 mohua were translocated from Breaksea Island to predator-free Codfish Island / Whenua Hou, and more were introduced to Whenua Hōu from the Catlins in 2018, increasing the island's population to about 1000. More releases are planned to islands in Fiordland.

Mōhua on predator-free Ulva Island

Pest control efforts by the Department of Conservation have managed to stabilise some mainland mohua populations. For example, where biodegradable 1080 poison was used to control rats in the Dart valley, there was a more than 80% survival rate, compared with just 10% in untreated areas. The population of mohua in the Landsborough valley has increased four-fold since 1998, thanks to an intensive programme of pest control, including aerial 1080. The population is now strong enough for birds to be transferred out to establish a new population on Resolution Island. Similar aerial 1080 operations in the Catlins and the Hurunui, Hawdon and Eglinton valleys have had equally encouraging results. DOC and TBfree New Zealand noted in March 2014 that there was a significant repopulation in the Catlins of other avian species, including bellbird and tomtit due to the reduction of predators.

== Popular culture ==
Since the redesign of New Zealand's currency in 1991 a yellowhead has appeared on the reverse side of the New Zealand $100 note.

== Literature ==
- Heather, Barrie D; Robertson, Hugh A & Onley, Derek (2000). The field guide to the birds of New Zealand. Viking: Printing Press. ISBN 0-670-89370-6.
