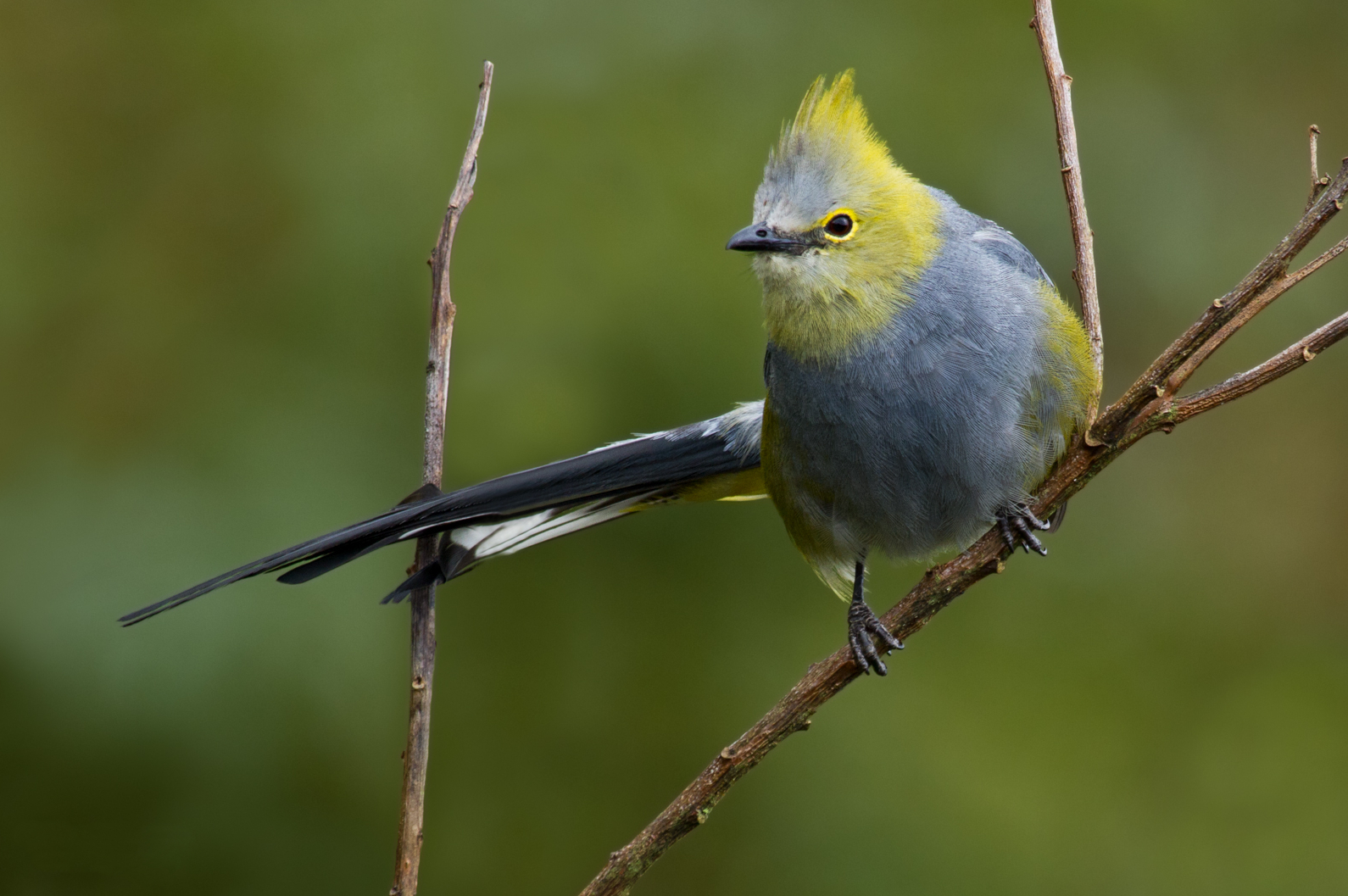

Conservation status
- Least Concern (IUCN 3.1)

Scientific classification
- Kingdom: Animalia
- Phylum: Chordata
- Class: Aves
- Order: Passeriformes
- Family: Ptiliogonatidae
- Genus: Ptiliogonys
- Species: P. caudatus

Binomial name
- Ptiliogonys caudatus Cabanis, 1861

Audio

= Long-tailed silky-flycatcher =

Species of bird

The long-tailed silky-flycatcher (Ptiliogonys caudatus) is a passerine bird in the family Ptiliogonatidae. It is found in Costa Rica and Panama.

== Taxonomy and systematics ==
The long-tailed silky-flycatcher is monotypic. It and the grey silky-flycatcher (P. cinereus) are sister species.

== Description ==
The long-tailed silky-flycatcher is 20 to 24.4 cm (7.9 to 9.6 in) long and weighs about 37 g (1.3 oz). It is a slender bird with a prominent crest and a long tail whose central pair of feathers extend beyond the others. Adult males have a gray forehead and crown and a thin yellow eye-ring. The rest of their face, their crest, and their neck are yellowish olive-green. Their back, rump, uppertail coverts and upperwing coverts are bluish gray. Their flight feathers and tail are black with most tail feathers having a large white patch in their middle. Their throat is grayish olive-green and their breast and upper belly a slightly paler olive-green than their back. Their lower belly, sides, and flanks are yellowish olive-green and their undertail coverts bright yellow. Adult females are overall duller than males and have a somewhat shorter tail. Their head, neck, and crest are a paler yellowish olive-green than the male's. Their back, rump, uppertail coverts, upperwing coverts, breast, and upper belly are olivaceous gray. Their lower belly is yellowish white, their flanks greenish yellow, and their undertail coverts yellow. Both sexes have a dark iris, a black bill, and black legs and feet. Juveniles are generally light grayish brown. They have a whitish eye-ring, brownish uppertail coverts, paler underparts than adults, pale yellow undertail coverts, and brownish bill and feet.

== Distribution and habitat ==
The long-tailed silky-flycatcher is found in the Cordillera Central in central Costa Rica and the Cordillera de Talamanca which extends from south-central Costa Rica into western Panama. The ranges are separated from each other by deep river valleys in which the silky-flycatcher is not found. It inhabits somewhat open landscapes in the subtropical and temperate zones. These include the edges of primary forest, secondary forest, pastures with scattered trees, and gardens. Sources differ on the species' elevational range. Two state it as 1,800 to 3,000 m (5,900 to 9,800 ft) and a third as 1,600 m (5,200 ft) to timberline.

== Behavior ==
=== Movement ===
The long-tailed silky-flycatcher is a year-round resident. It makes no migratory movements but in the non-breeding season ranges widely, and individuals wander to elevations below its range's usual lower limit.

=== Feeding ===
The long-tailed silky-flycatcher feeds on insects and small fruits. It feeds on fruit at any level of its habitat by plucking while perched. It takes insects in mid-air from a perch high in a tree, often gathering several in one sortie.

=== Breeding ===
The long-tailed silky-flycatcher breeds between April and June. It breeds as solitary monogamous pairs or in loose colonies of up to about five pairs; it defends only the immediate area of the nest. The nest is a bulky open cup made mostly of Usnea lichen held together with spider web. It is placed in a branch fork or on a horizontal branch; nests have been noted between about 2 and 18 m (7 and 59 ft) above the ground. Males begin the nest building and both sexes finish it. The clutch is two eggs. The incubation period is 16 to 17 days and fledging occurs 24 to 25 days after hatch. The female incubates the clutch and broods nestlings. The male feeds the female during nest building and incubation; both sexes provision nestlings. Nest predators include the brown jay (Cyanocorax morio). Adults and nestlings are a host to the chewing louse Brueelia ptilogonis.

=== Vocalization ===
The long-tailed silky-flycatcher makes a "wooden and staccato (but sweet) chittering". Its vocalizations have also been described as "a sharp, dry che chip, che chip, likened to [the] sound of loose pebbles in a box when uttered by a flock", "a rattling che-e-e-e-e or bell-like tinkling note" in flight, and "low lisping notes punctuated by louder che chip notes".

== Status ==
The IUCN has assessed the long-tailed silky-flycatcher as being of Least Concern. It has a large range; its estimated population of between 20,000 and 50,000 mature individuals is believed to be stable. No immediate threats have been identified. It is considered fairly common in Costa Rica. "Highland forests in Costa Rica and Panama have suffered widespread destruction as a result of burning, logging and agricultural expansion."

== Gallery ==
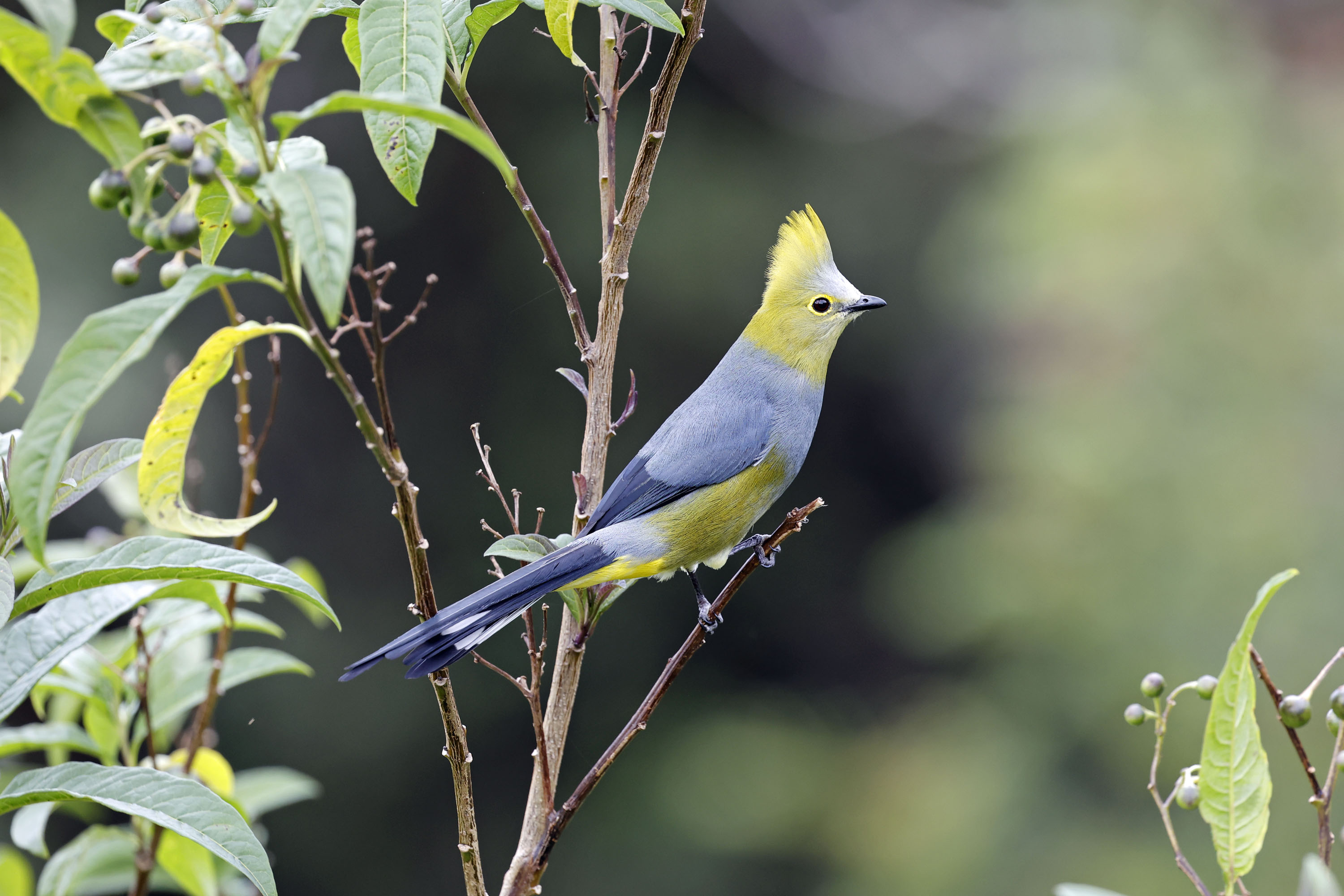
In Parque Nacional Los Quetzales, Costa Rica, 21 March 2024.

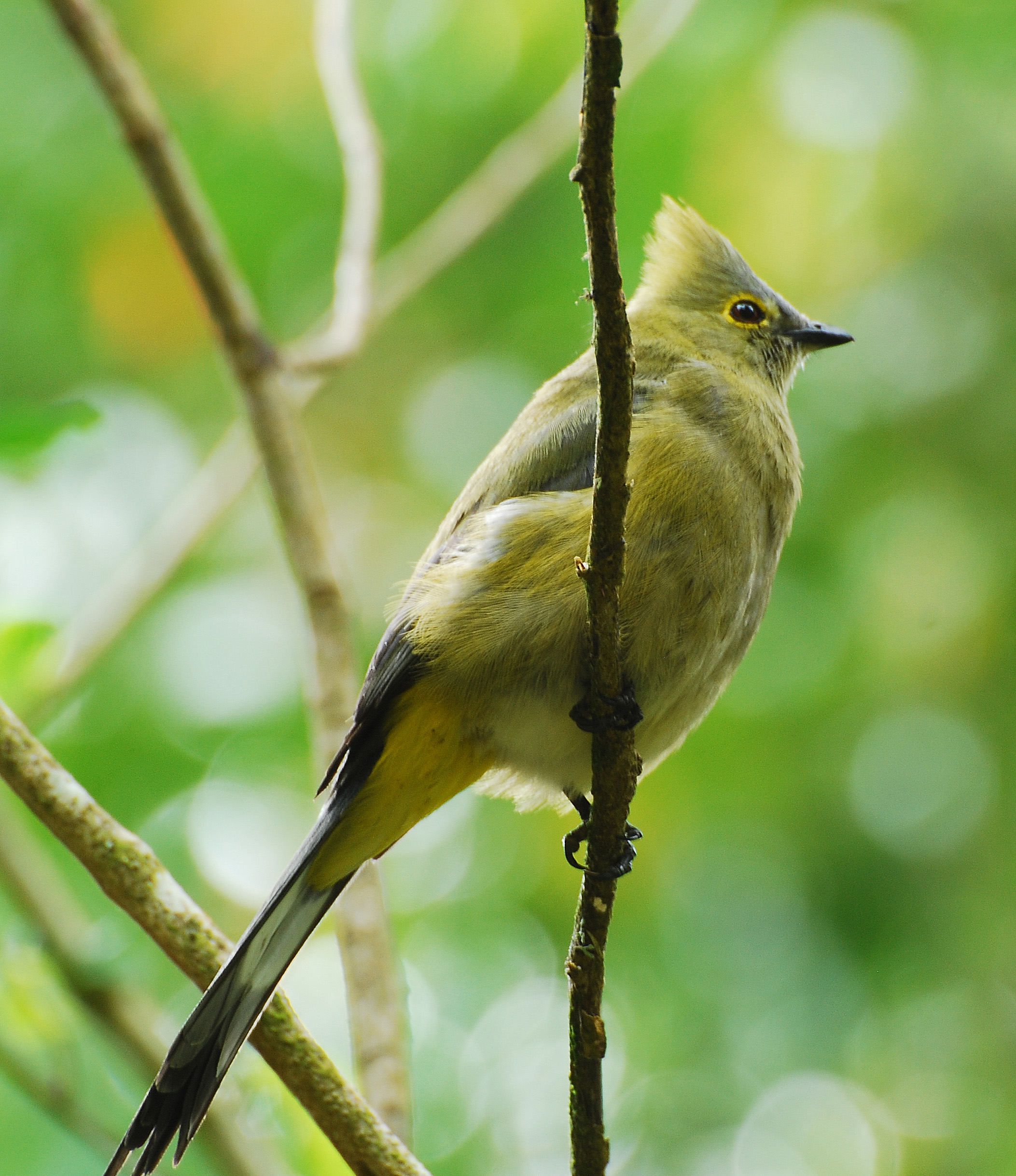
Long-tailed silky-flycatcher in Costa Rica

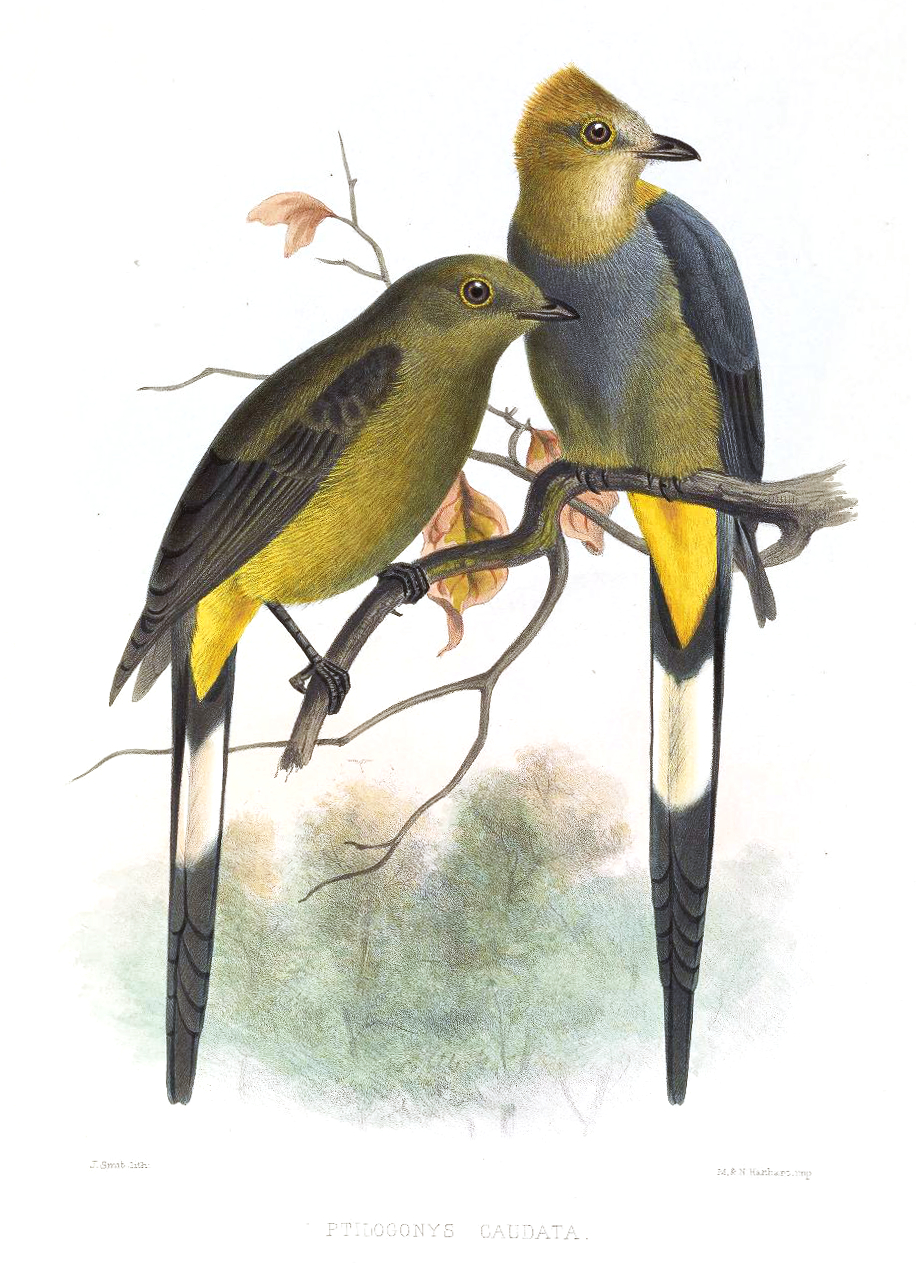
Illustration by Joseph Smit (1869)
