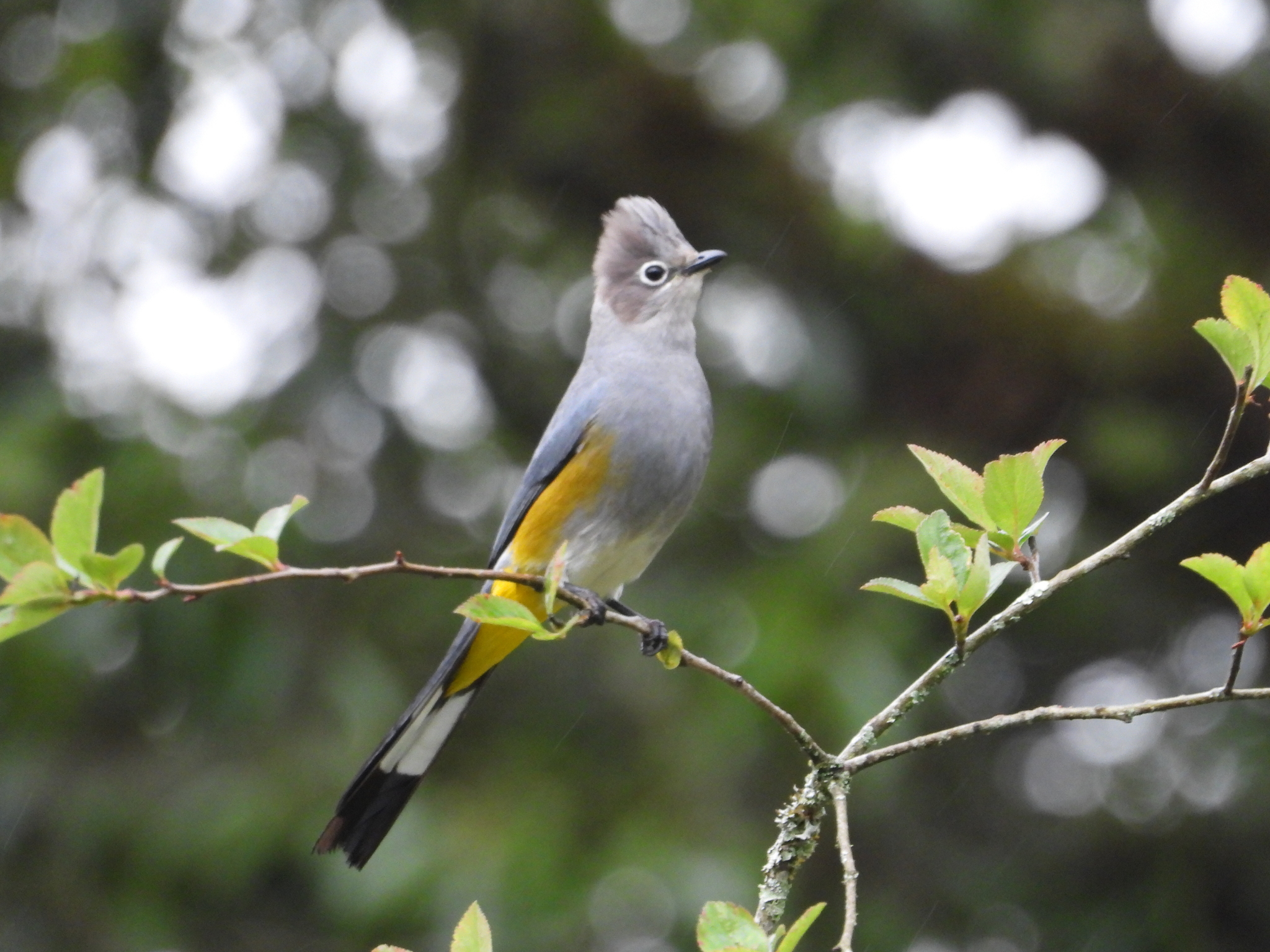

Conservation status
- Least Concern (IUCN 3.1)

Scientific classification
- Kingdom: Animalia
- Phylum: Chordata
- Class: Aves
- Order: Passeriformes
- Family: Ptiliogonatidae
- Genus: Ptiliogonys
- Species: P. cinereus

Binomial name
- Ptiliogonys cinereus Swainson, 1827

= Grey silky-flycatcher =

Species of bird

The grey silky-flycatcher (Ptiliogonys cinereus) is a species of bird in the family Ptiliogonatidae. It is found in Guatemala and Mexico and as a vagrant in Texas, United States.

== Taxonomy and systematics ==
The grey silky-flycatcher has these four subspecies:

- P. c. cinereus Swainson, 1827
- P. c. otofuscus Moore, RT, 1935
- P. c. pallescens Griscom, 1934
- P. c. molybdophanes Ridgway, 1887

The grey silky-flycatcher and the long-tailed silky-flycatcher (P. caudatus) are sister species.

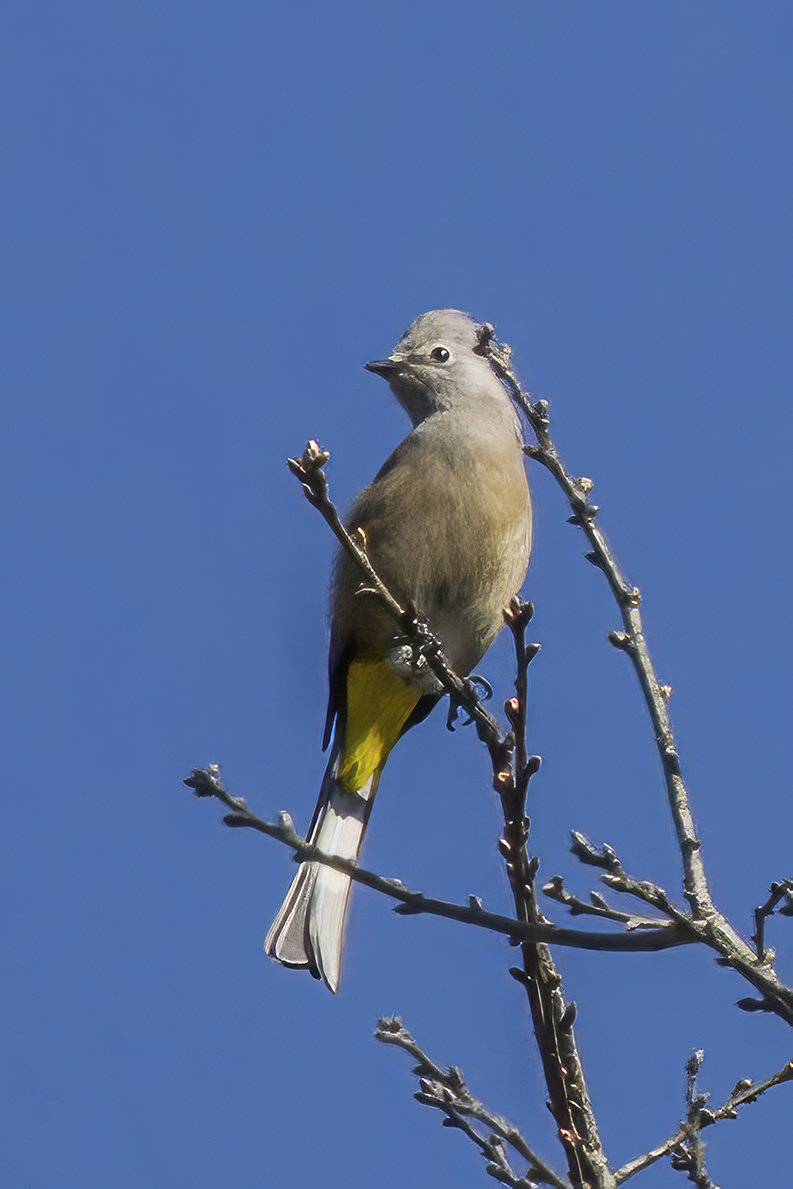
P. c. molybdophanes, Guatemala

== Description ==
The grey silky-flycatcher is 18.5 to 21 cm (7.3 to 8.3 in) long. It is a slender bird with a prominent crest and a long tail. Adult males of the nominate subspecies P. c. cinereus have dusky lores, a white patch above the lores, a thin white eye-ring, and a white or brownish white chin and cheeks on an otherwise blue-gray head and crest. Their upperparts are blue-gray. Their flight feathers are black. Their central pair of tail feathers are black and the rest have a black base, a white upper half, and black lower half. Their throat and breast are gray, their belly whitish, their flanks golden-olive or yellow, and their undertail coverts bright yellow. Adult females have a gray head and crest with a white eye-ring, grayish brown upperparts, brown sides and flanks, and a white belly. Both sexes have a dark iris, a black bill, and black legs and feet. Juveniles resemble adult females with paler underparts.

Males of subspecies P. c. molybdophanes have deeper bluish gray upperparts than the nominate and have olive-green flanks. Females are overall darker than the nominate except for having the same bright yellow undertail coverts. Males of P. c. otofuscus have upperparts colored midway between the nominate's and molybdophanes's. They have darker ear coverts and the whitish of their belly is more extensive than the nominate's. Females have a grayer back, lighter rump and uppertail coverts, and a darker breast than the nominate. Males of P. c. pallescens are paler and grayer than the nominate, with grayer ear coverts and grayish white (not brownish white) loral spot, chin, and throat. Females are paler and less brown than the nominate, with more contrast between a gray crown and throat and the back and breast.

== Distribution and habitat ==
The subspecies of the grey silky-flycatcher are found thus:

- P. c. cinereus: from southern Coahuila, southern Nuevo León, and Jalisco south to southern and western Michoacán and Oaxaca in central and eastern Mexico
- P. c. otofuscus: southern Sonora, southwestern Chihuahua, eastern Sinaloa, western Durango, and western Zacatecas in northwestern Mexico
- P. c. pallescens: eastern Michoacán and Guerrero in southwestern Mexico
- P. c. molybdophanes: from Chiapas in southern Mexico south into south-central Guatemala

The species has also been recorded as a vagrant in southern and western Texas.

The grey silky-flycatcher inhabits pine, pine-oak, and juniper forest in the subtropical and temperate zones. It also occurs in pine savanna and rarely in cloudforest. Sources differ on its overall elevational range; one states it is 1,100 to 3,200 m (3,600 to 10,500 ft) and another mostly 1,000 to 3,500 m (3,300 to 11,500 ft) and lower in winter. In Guatemala it is found from 1,200 to 3,050 m (3,900 to 10,000 ft) but mostly above 1,700 m (5,600 ft).

== Behavior ==
=== Movement ===
The grey silky-flycatcher is overall a year-round resident. Some individuals move lower in winter and may wander into habitat adjacent to their usual one. Some may withdraw from northwestern Mexico in winter.

=== Feeding ===
The grey silky-flycatcher feeds on insects and small fruits. It particularly favors mistletoe (Loranthaceae) berries. It feeds on fruit by plucking while perched and takes insects in mid-air from a high perch. It often forages in flocks of up to 15 individuals.

=== Breeding ===
The grey silky-flycatcher's breeding season has not been defined but includes May and June in Mexico. Its nest is an open cup made from plant fibers and hair with leafy lichen on the outside and lined with Usnea lichen. The clutch is two eggs. The incubation period, time to fledging, and details of parental care are not known.

=== Vocalization ===
The grey silky-flycatcher's song is "a warbled series of chuck notes, high seep notes and quiet whistles". It also makes a loud "tu whip, tu whip" whose second note is higher-pitched and more emphatic, a "dry chi-che-rup che-chep", a "nasal k-lik", and a "rattling note in flight".

== Status ==
The IUCN has assessed the grey silky-flycatcher as being of Least Concern. It has a very large range; its estimated population of at least 500,000 mature individuals is believed to be decreasing. No immediate threats have been identified. It is uncommon in Sonora, fairly common to common in the rest of Mexico, and fairly common in Guatemala. The IUCN lists but does not detail its local and national use a pet, but its "[l]egal harvest for cagebird trade surpasses 4000 individuals annually".
