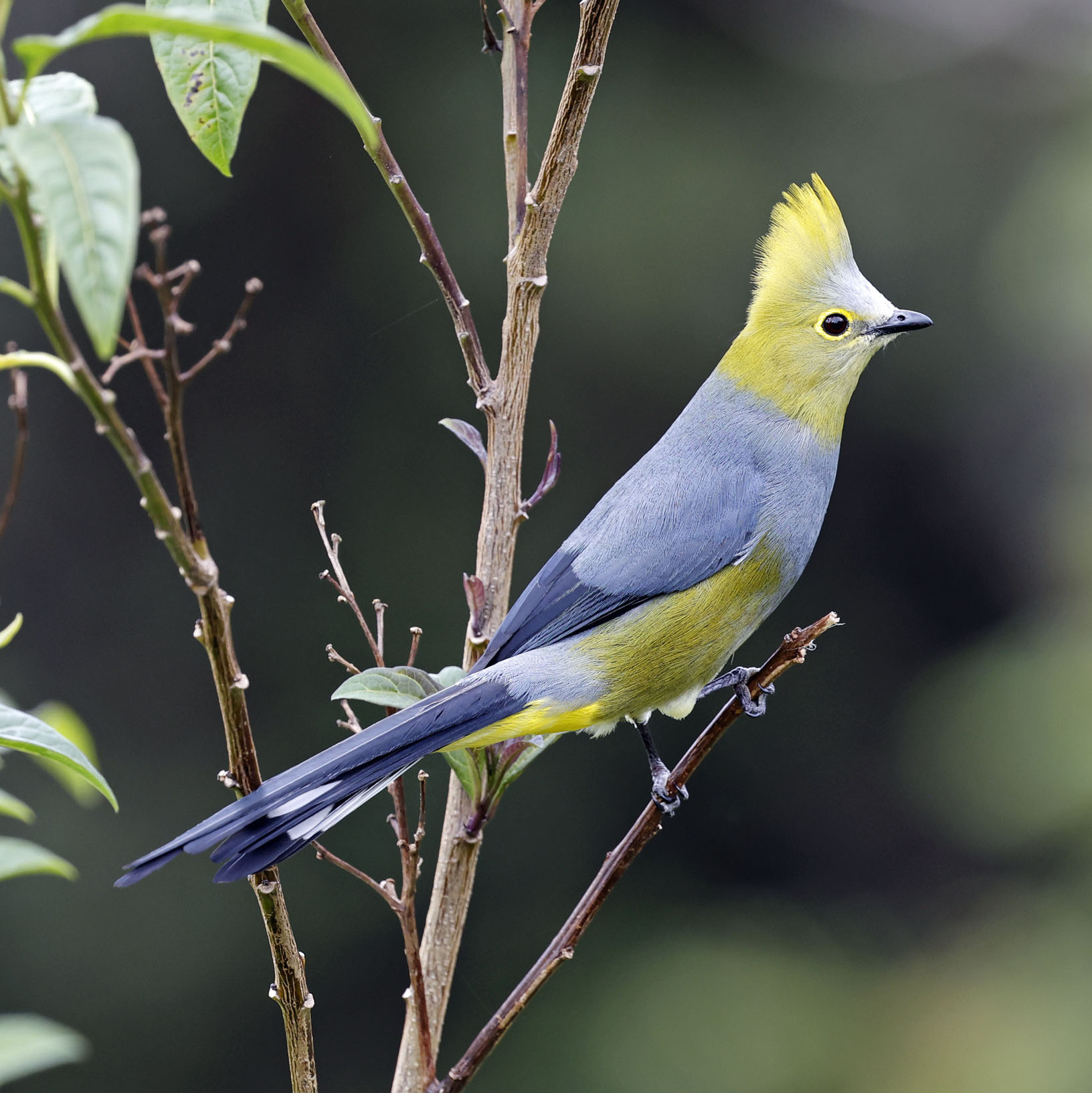
- Long-tailed silky-flycatcher (P. caudatus)
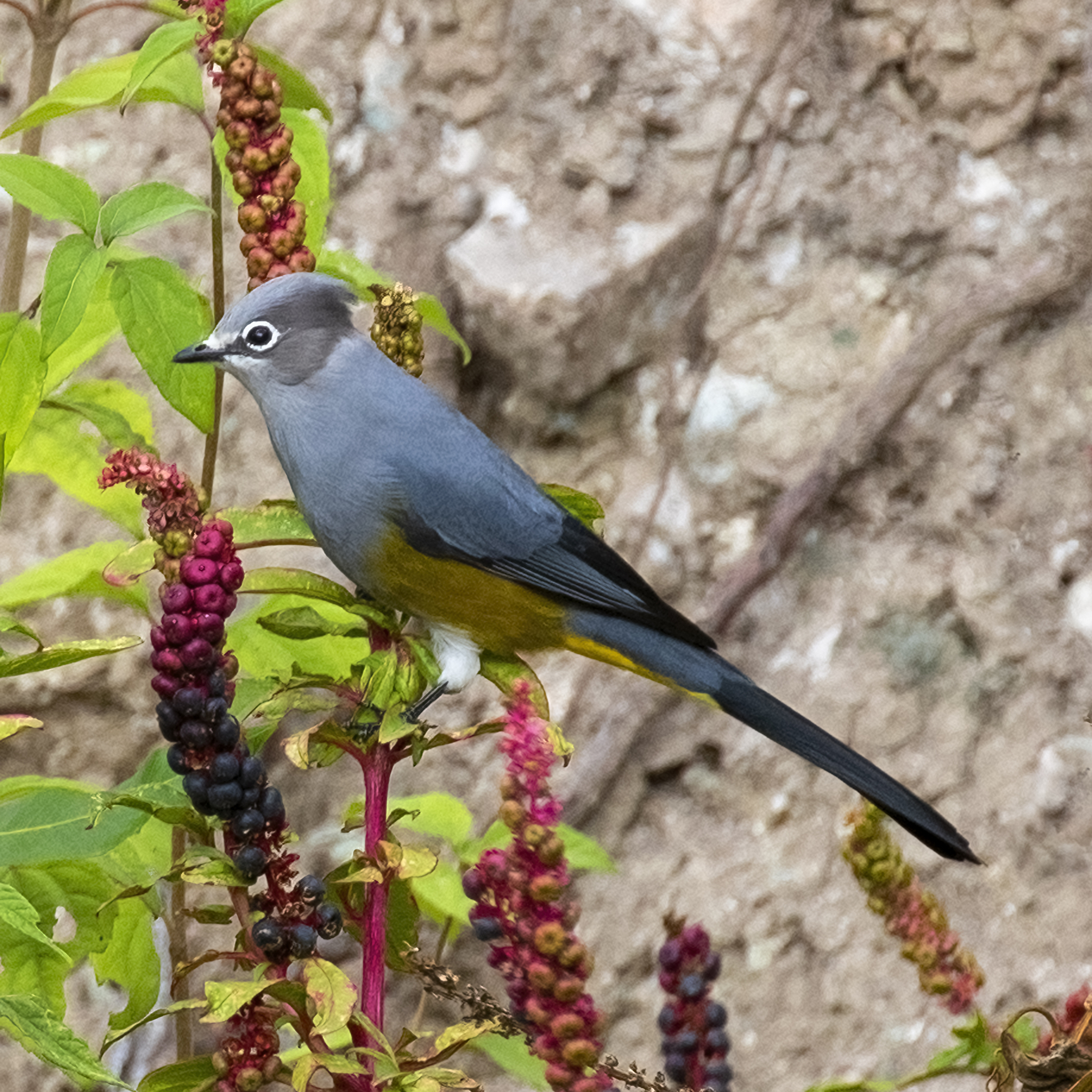
- Gray silky-flycatcher (P. cinereus)

Scientific classification
- Kingdom: Animalia
- Phylum: Chordata
- Class: Aves
- Order: Passeriformes
- Family: Ptiliogonatidae
- Genus: Ptiliogonys; Swainson, 1827

Type species
- Ptiliogonys cinereus Swainson, 1827

Synonyms
- Ptilogonys

= Ptiliogonys =

Genus of birds

Ptiliogonys is a genus of bird in the family Ptiliogonatidae.

== Species ==
It contains the following species:

Genus Ptiliogonys – Swainson, 1827 – two species
Common name	Scientific name and subspecies	Range	Size and ecology	IUCN status and estimated population
Long-tailed silky-flycatcher	Ptiliogonys caudatus Cabanis, 1861	Costa Rica and western Panama	Size: Habitat: Diet:	LC
Grey silky-flycatcher	Ptiliogonys cinereus Swainson, 1827	Guatemala and Mexico	Size: Habitat: Diet:	LC
