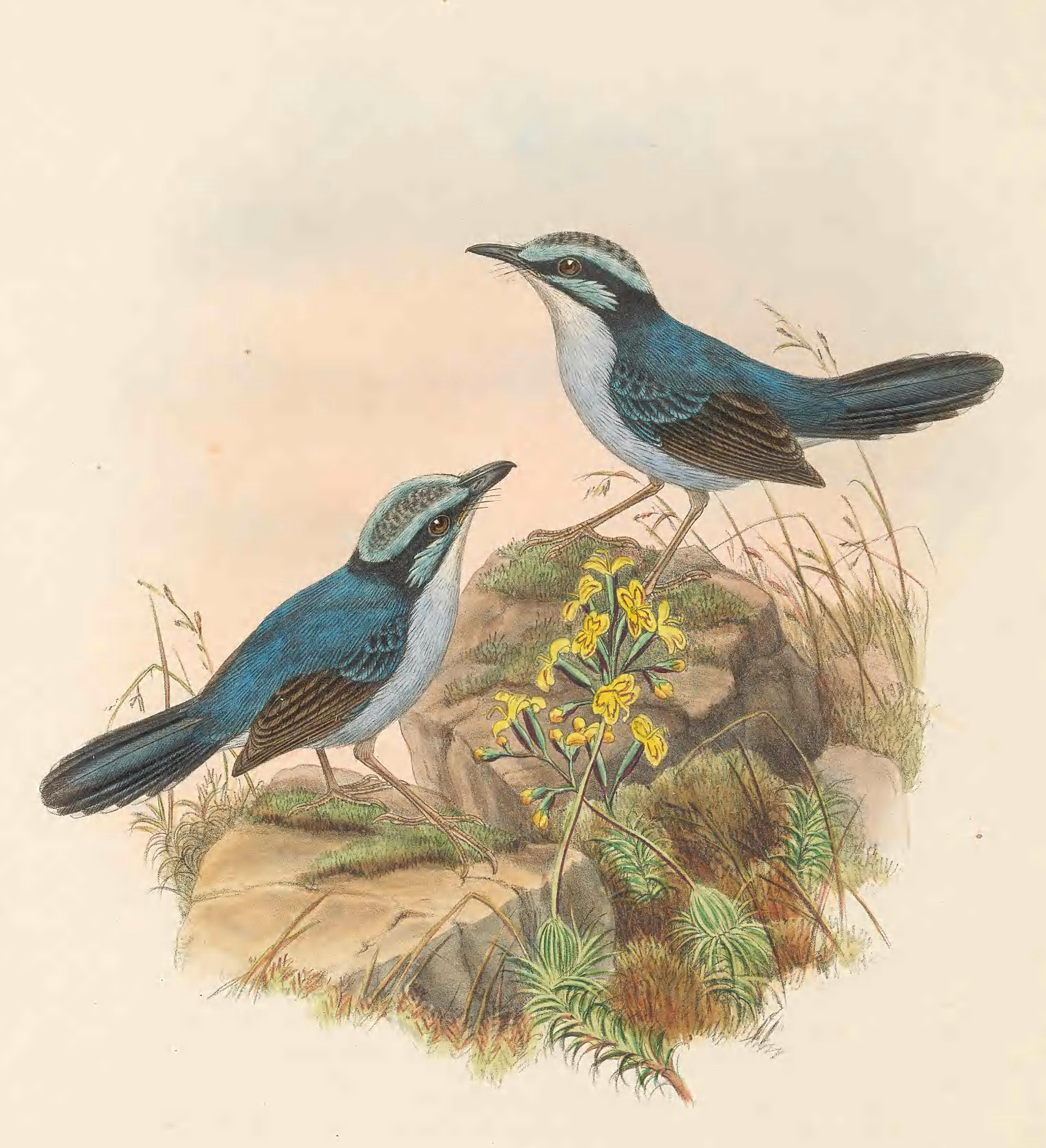
- Chenorhamphus grayi

Scientific classification
- Kingdom: Animalia
- Phylum: Chordata
- Class: Aves
- Order: Passeriformes
- Family: Maluridae
- Genus: Chenorhamphus; Oustalet, 1878

Type species
- Chenorhamphus cyanopectus Oustalet, 1878

Species
- see text

= Chenorhamphus =

Genus of birds

Chenorhamphus is a genus of birds in the Australasian wren family, Maluridae.

== Taxonomy and systematics ==
The species of the genus Chenorhamphus were formerly classified in the genus Malurus until a 2011 analysis of mitochondrial and nuclear DNA showed high divergence between the two taxa resulting in them being re-split into separate species. The study also found them to lie in a separate clade with the genera Sipodotus and Clytomyias and distinct from the genus Malurus. This led to the subsequent re-classification of the species into their own genus, Chenorhamphus.

The genus contains two species:

- Broad-billed fairywren (Chenorhamphus grayi)
- Campbell's fairywren (Chenorhamphus campbelli)
