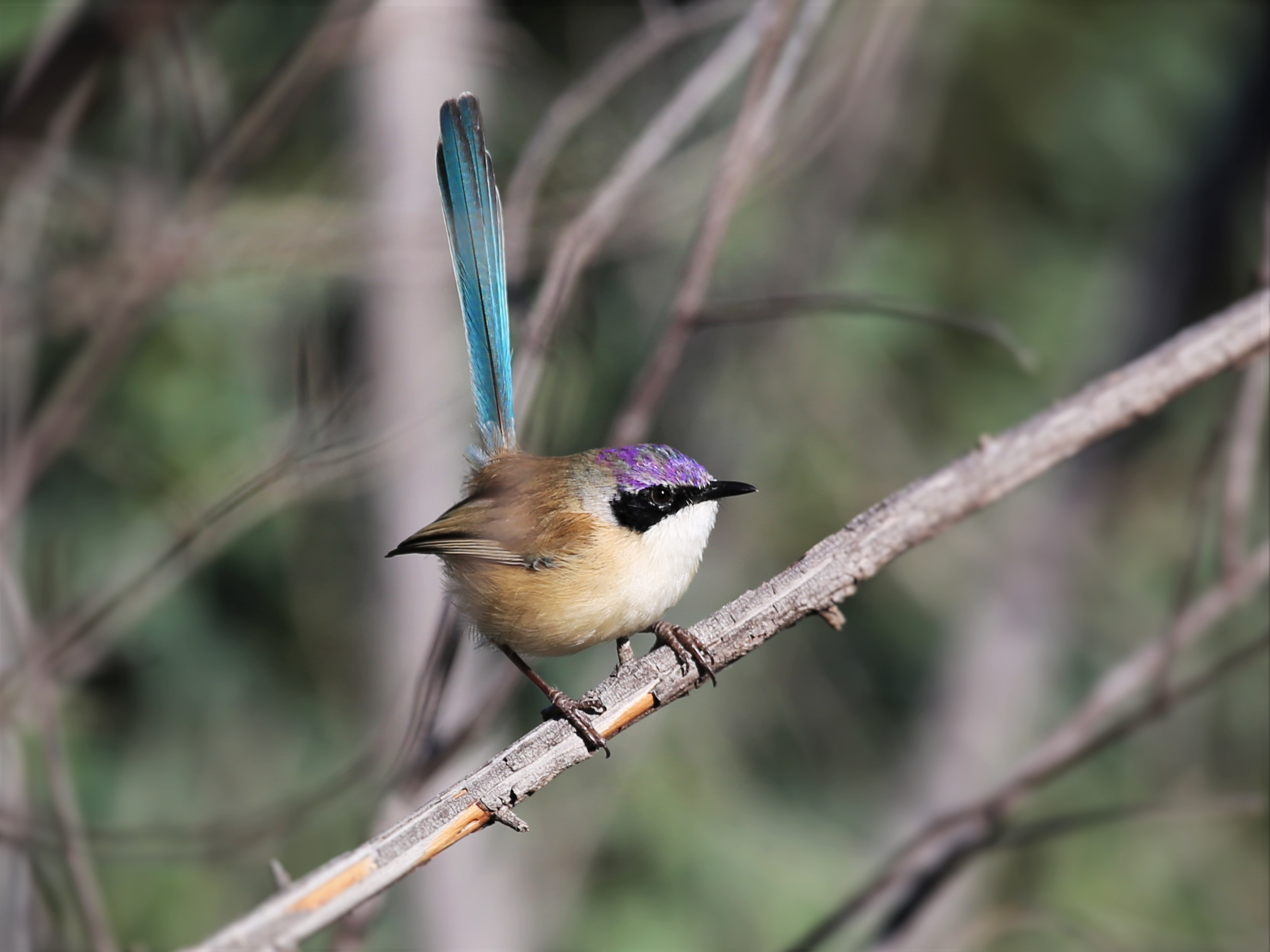
- Male purple-crowned fairy-wren

Conservation status
- Least Concern (IUCN 3.1)

Scientific classification
- Kingdom: Animalia
- Phylum: Chordata
- Class: Aves
- Order: Passeriformes
- Family: Maluridae
- Genus: Malurus
- Species: M. coronatus

Binomial name
- Malurus coronatus Gould, 1858
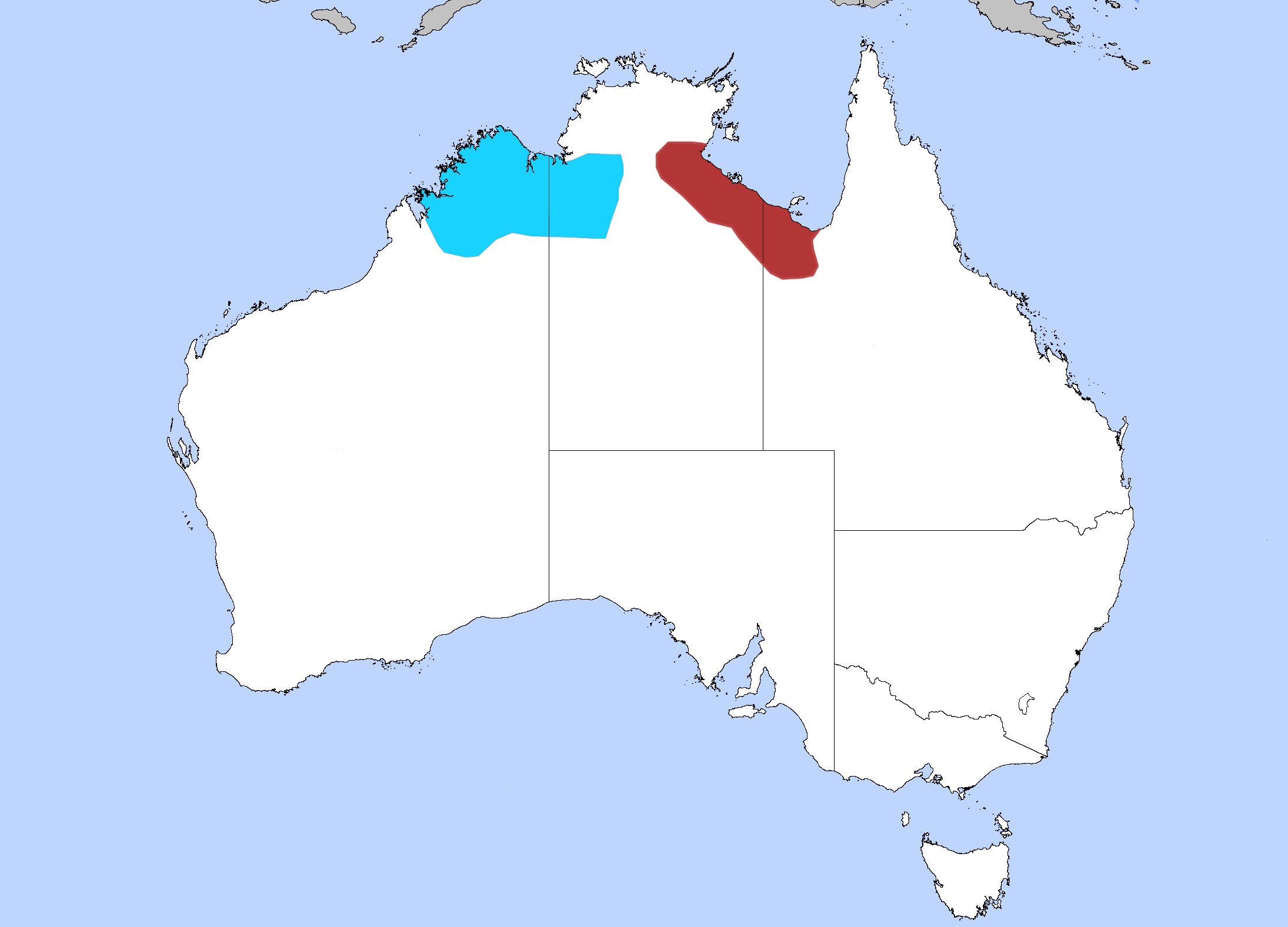
- Range of M. c. subsp. coronatus Range of M. c. subsp. macgillivrayi

Audio

= Purple-crowned fairywren =

Species of bird endemic to Australia

The purple-crowned fairywren (Malurus coronatus) is a species of bird in the Australasian wren family, Maluridae. It is the largest of the twelve species in the genus Malurus and is endemic to northern Australia. The species name is derived from the Latin word cǒrōna meaning "crown", owing to the distinctive purple circle of crown feathers sported by breeding males. Genetic evidence shows that the purple-crowned fairywren is most closely related to the superb fairywren and splendid fairywren. Purple-crowned fairywrens can be distinguished from other fairywrens in northern Australia by the presence of cheek patches (either black in males or reddish-chocolate in females) and the deep blue colour of their perky tails.

Like other fairywrens, the purple-crowned fairywren is socially monogamous. However, unlike other species in the genus, it is not sexually promiscuous and shows low rates of extra-pair paternity. However, females with related males as partners will mate with other individuals. This is thought to be an adaptation to avoid inbreeding depression. They build small dome-shaped nests in which 2–3 eggs are laid, with up to three clutches per year. It is mainly insectivorous, feeding on a wide variety of invertebrates, and supplements its diet with seeds.

The purple-crowned fairywren inhabits riparian habitat with dense vegetation, such as well-developed midstoreys composed of dense shrubs or tall, dense thickets of river grass. Unlike the related superb fairywren, it has not adapted to urbanised habitats very well and has suffered severe population loss in some areas. While the species overall is considered of least-concern for conservation, its western subspecies is listed as endangered. Livestock grazing, fires, and invasive species are chief concerns for the population. The Australian government and conservation groups have active conservation interventions for the species, including for fire and invasive species management.

== Taxonomy and systematics ==
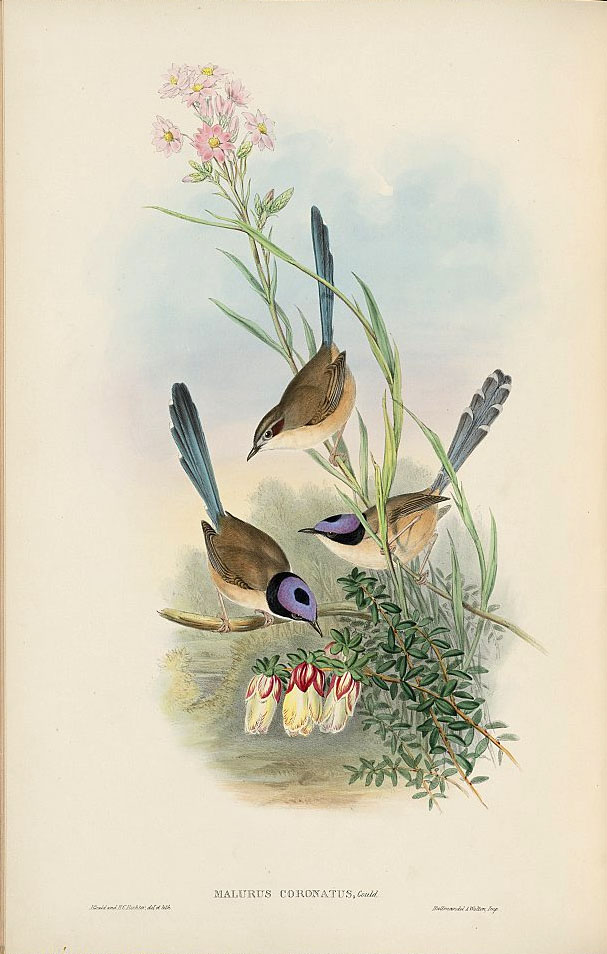
An illustration of purple-crowned fairywrens by H. C. Richter in The Birds of Australia, 1840–1848

The purple-crowned fairywren was first collected in 1855 and 1856 by the explorer Joseph Ravenscroft Elsey at Victoria River and Robinson River. The species was first described by the ornithologist John Gould in 1858. The specific name comes from the Latin word cǒrōna, meaning crown. Gregory Mathews described the subspecies M. c. macgillivrayi in 1913. Subspecies designation was originally based on differences in plumage coloration and body size of museum skins. More recent genetic analyses continue to support this split. The species has also been placed in the monotypic genus Rosina, but protein evidence supports its placement in the current genus. Alternative names for the purple-crowned fairywren include crowned superb warbler, lilac-crowned fairywren, lilac-crowned wren, mauve-crowned wren, purple-crowned warbler, purple-crowned wren, and purple-crowned wren-warbler.

It is one of twelve species in the genus Malurus, commonly known as fairywrens. Within the genus it is most closely related to the splendid fairywren and superb fairywren. It is also sometimes placed as a sister to clade including the two "blue wrens" along with the white-shouldered fairywren, white-winged fairywren, and the red-backed fairywren, also called the bicoloured wrens.

Like other fairywrens, the purple-crowned fairywren is unrelated to the true wrens. It was previously classified as a member of the Old World flycatcher family Muscicapidae and later as a member of the warbler family Sylviidae before being placed in the newly recognised Maluridae in 1975. More recently, DNA analysis has shown the family Maluridae to be related to the Meliphagidae (honeyeaters), and the Pardalotidae in the large superfamily Meliphagoidea.

=== Evolution ===
Combined mitochondrial and nuclear DNA from the purple-crowned fairywren genome suggest that its lineage diverged from those of the splendid and superb fairywrens c. 7–8 million years ago. More recently, the purple-crowned fairywren appears to have diverged from a group that now includes the blue-breasted fairywren, the red-winged fairywren, the lovely fairywren, and the variegated fairywren around six million years ago.

These evolutionary radiations followed an earlier split of the grasswrens Amytornithinae from what would become the emu-wrens and fairy wrens approximately 23 million years ago.

=== Subspecies ===
Two subspecies are currently recognized:

- M. coronatus coronatus (Gould, 1858): Also known as the western purple-crowned fairywren, it is the nominate subspecies and is found in north-western regions of Australia.
- M. coronatus macgillivrayi (Mathews, 1913): Also known as MacGillivray's fairywren, previously considered a separate species, it is found in north-central Australia.

== Description ==
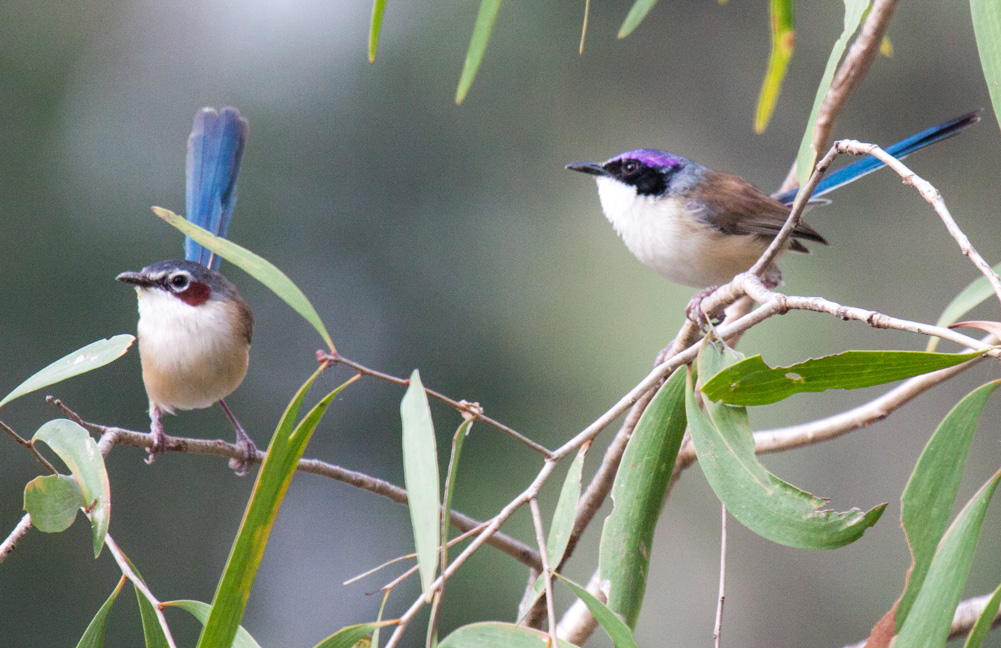
Male and female purple-crowned fairywren (subspecies macgillivrayi)

The purple-crowned fairywren is a small, sexually dimorphic, bird measuring approximately 14 cm (5.5 in) in length, with a wing-span of approximately 16 cm (6.3 in) and weighing only 9–13 g (0.32–0.46 oz). It can be differentiated from other North Australian fairywrens by the presence of cheeks patches and the deep blue color of their tails. The plumage is brown overall, with the wings more greyish brown and the belly cream-buff. The blue tail is long and upright, and all except the central pair of feathers are broadly tipped with white. Their bill is black and the legs and feet are brownish grey. Although there is a slight geographical variation between the two subspecies, only the difference in colour of mantle is noticeable in the field. The crown and nape of M. c. macgillivrayi is slightly bluer, and its mantle and upper back has weak blue-grey shading, whereas the slightly larger M. c. coronatus has a browner back, as well as a buff-coloured, rather than white, breast and belly.

=== Crown ===
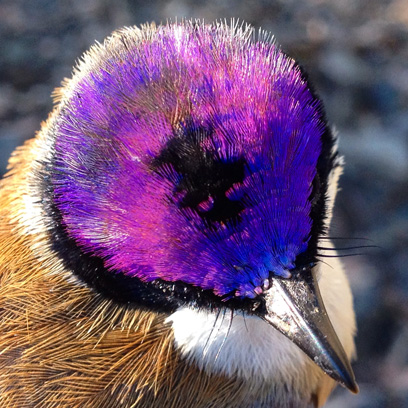
Crown of the male purple-crowned fairywren (subspecies macgillivrayi)

During the breeding season, adult males develop the spectacular bright purple feathers on their crown. This is bordered by a black face mask and capped with an oblong black spot on top of the head. During the non-breeding season, the male's colourful crown is replaced by grey/brown feathers and its black mask with black cheek patches and an off-white to pale grey orbital ring. The adult female differs in having a blue-tinged grey crown, chestnut ear-coverts, and a greenish blue tail. Immature birds are very similar to adult females except for a duller coloration, a brown crown, and longer tail, though male birds start to show black feathers on the face by six to nine months

Within a group, males who are breeding molt into their bright crown earlier than their non-breeding subordinates, and do so even sooner after heavy rains the preceding season. Experiments have demonstrated that breeding males view more colourful plumage among nearby males as a source of competition, and behave more aggressively towards them.

=== Vocalisations ===
The song of the purple-crowned fairywren is distinct from that of other fairywrens – it is of lower pitch, and quite loud. Breeding pairs use song to communicate and use duets to ward off itinerant fairywrens from their territory. Three calls have been recorded: a loud reel cheepa-cheepa-cheepa, a quieter chet – a contact call between birds in a group when foraging, and an alarm call – a harsh zit.

== Distribution and habitat ==
The species occurs across the wet-dry tropics of northern Australia, and is found in the Kimberley region of Western Australia, in the Victoria River region of the Northern Territory, and in the south-western sub-coastal region of the Gulf of Carpentaria in Queensland. Whilst the species' distribution spans more than 1,500 km (930 mi), it is constrained by the quality and extent of riparian vegetation along waterways. A natural geographic barrier of approximately 300 km (190 mi) of unsuitable habitat separates the two subspecies. The western subspecies M. c. coronatus occurs in the midsections of large river catchments that drain the Central Kimberley Plateau, and along sections of the Victoria River. The eastern subspecies M. c. macgillivrayi occurs along most rivers draining into south-western and southern Gulf of Carpentaria from Roper River in Northern Territory to Leichhardt and Flinders Rivers in Queensland.

The purple-crowned fairywren is a riparian habitat specialist that occurs in patches of dense river-fringing vegetation in northern Australia. Its preferred habitat, which lines the permanent freshwater creeks and rivers, consists of a well-developed mid-storey that is composed of dense shrubs (i.e. Pandanus aquaticus and/or a freshwater mangrove, Barringtonia acutangula), as seen in the Kimberley region or areas of 1.5–2 m (4 ft 11 in – 6 ft 7 in) tall, dense thickets of river grass dominated by Chionachne cyanthopoda as seen in the Victoria River District. A tall dense canopy of emergent trees, used as a temporary refuge during flooding events that submerge the mid-storey, is often dominated by Eucalyptus camaldulensis, Melaleuca leucadendra, Melaleuca argentea and Ficus spp.

== Behaviour and ecology ==
Like all other species in the genus Malurus, the purple-crowned fairywren is a cooperative breeder and lives in sedentary groups that maintain their territories, often arranged linearly along creeks and rivers, year-round. However, unlike other species in the genus that are highly promiscuous, purple-crowned fairywrens display high levels of fidelity and low rates of extra-pair paternity. Groups generally consist of a breeding pair that is helped by one to six offspring from previous broods, and helpers may stay with their parents for several years before attempting to breed. Only the dominant pair in a group reproduces, and individuals can remain un-reproductive subordinates for several years. These subordinates help raise the offspring, improving productivity as well as the survival of the breeding pair.

=== Breeding and nesting ===
Group territories are maintained throughout the year, and usually the same site (or area) is used year after year. The spatial arrangement of purple-crowned fairywren territories differ depending on what plant species dominate the understory. Territories in Pandanus are usually arranged in a linear fashion, and generally occupy between 50–300 m (160–980 ft) of river length, whereas territories may be arranged in a mosaic pattern in areas where the understory consists of tall river-grasses such as C. cyanthopoda.

Breeding can occur at any time throughout the year, if conditions are suitable, with peaks in the early (March to May) and late (August to November) dry season. Most nests have been recorded close to the ground in thickets of river grass, C. cyanthopoda and P. aquaticus. Only the females build the small dome shaped nests constructed mainly of fine rootlets, grass, leaves and strips of bark. Pairs may produce up to three broods per year. A clutch containing 2–3 eggs is laid over successive days, and is incubated by only females for 14 days, and chicks fledge after ten days. Fledglings are unable to fly and stay in dense cover for a week and are fed by members of the family group for at least another three weeks.

Incestuous matings by the purple-crowned fairywren result in severe fitness costs due to inbreeding depression (greater than 30% reduction in hatchability of eggs). Females paired with related males may undertake extra pair matings that can reduce the negative effects of inbreeding (although social monogamy occurs in about 90% of avian species, an estimated 90% of socially monogamous species exhibit individual promiscuity in the form of extra-pair copulations, i.e. copulation outside the pair bond). Although there are ecological and demographic constraints on extra pair matings, 43% of broods produced by incestuously paired females contained extra pair young. In general, inbreeding is avoided because it leads to a reduction in progeny fitness (inbreeding depression) largely due to the homozygous expression of deleterious recessive alleles.

=== Dispersal ===
The population genetic structure of the species suggests it generally disperses along waterways. The average natal dispersal of the purple-crowned fairywren is less than 3 km (1.9 mi) of river distance in quality habitat, but movements of up to 70 km (43 mi) of river distance have been recorded. Most dispersal occurs when helpers abandon their natal territories in search of their own breeding territory. Dispersal is sex-biased with most subordinate males remaining in their natal territory or moving to neighbouring territories, while females generally disperse further. Females are capable of both long-distance and between-catchment dispersal.

=== Diet and foraging ===
The species is mainly insectivorous. Birds consume a range of small invertebrates such as beetles, ants, bugs, wasps, grasshoppers, moths, larvae, spiders, and worms and small quantities of seeds. They forage for their prey amongst foliage and in the leaf litter on the ground that may have accumulated as debris during floods. Group members will forage separately, hopping rapidly through the dense undergrowth, but remain in contact with each other by making soft chet sounding calls.

== Survival ==
The time to maturity for purple-crowned fairywrens is one year for both sexes. A generation time of 8.3 years is derived from an average age at first breeding of 2.3 years, an annual survival of adults of 78.0%, and a maximum longevity in the wild of 17 years, with all values estimated from extrapolations of data from other Malurus spp.. The oldest confirmed record of a wild individual is a minimum age of 12 years according to the Australian Bird and Bat Banding Scheme database.

Numerous native animals potentially prey on eggs and nestlings of the purple-crowned fairywren, such as small semi-aquatic monitors (Varanus mitchelli, and V. mertensi), yellow-spotted goanna, Gilbert's dragon, common tree snake, common brown tree snake, olive python and pheasant coucals. Many Malurids are major cuckoo hosts in Australia. Horsfield's bronze-cuckoos will lay their eggs in the nest of purple-crowned fairywrens. Given the spatial arrangement of small populations in patchily distributed habitat across northern Australia, the species is potentially vulnerable to decline from loss of fairly small areas of habitat. The purple-crowned fairywren's greatest threat is degradation or loss of habitat from introduced herbivores, weeds, fire, flooding and mining. Introduced herbivores seeking water eat and trample riparian vegetation that purple-crowned fairywrens rely on for foraging, nesting and shelter. More frequent and/or more intense fires are detrimental as they can modify both the extent and structure of riparian vegetation. Interactions between climate change and habitat degradation are also likely, with the negative impacts of floods likely to be worse for populations living in degraded habitat.

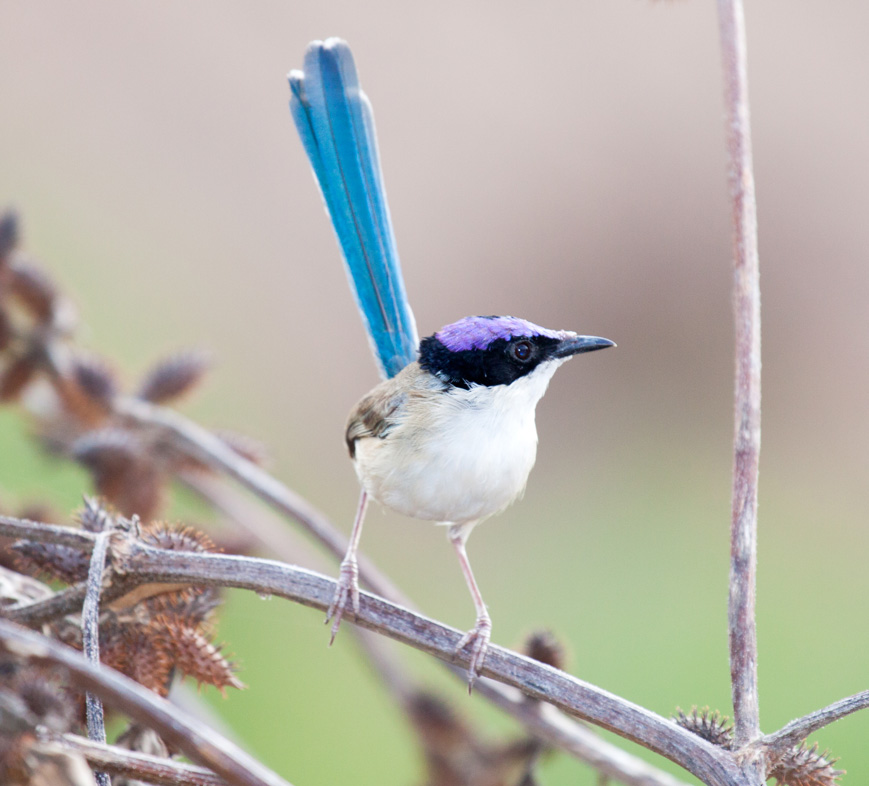
Male purple-crowned fairywren in a patch of noogoora burr (Xanthium strumarium), a prolific invasive weed of northern Australian riparian habitats

Predation by invasive species such as feral cats and black rats is also a threat as degradation of the understory causes a reduction of shelter exposing birds to predation. Populations of M. c. coronatus decreased by 50% over a two-year period at two sites in the Victoria River District where grazing and trampling was allowed around habitat patches. Very low breeding success from nest predation was attributed to black rats at one site.

== Status ==
The purple-crowned fairywren is currently classified as Least Concern by the IUCN. However, the two recognised subspecies receive separate national conservation management listings. In 2015, the Australian Federal Government upgraded the conservation status of the western subspecies from Vulnerable to Endangered. According to the IUCN Red List, the western subspecies meets the criteria for being listed as Endangered while the eastern subspecies meets criteria for Near Threatened.

The population size for M. c. macgillivrayi may be close to 10,000 mature individuals in a single subpopulation, while recent surveys of M. c. coronatus estimate that the overall population size is possibly as low as 10,000, given the extent of available habitat. The species has suffered severe declines in population. It now only occurs on a subset of the waterways where they were previously found. Specifically, three substantial declines are recorded. The species disappeared from the lower Fitzroy River around the 1920s with the introduction of sheep and cattle grazing, and subsequent replacement of native riparian vegetation by weeds. They disappeared from a large section of the Ord River following construction of the Ord River Dam and subsequent flooding of the area. Finally, a more recent study in the Victoria River region reported ongoing population decline in response to intensive cattle grazing of river frontages. The distribution of M. c. coronatus has been severely reduced since the subspecies was first discovered 140 years ago.

=== Conservation ===
The protection of riparian vegetation needs to be a priority for managers of all land tenures to ensure their persistence. Active conservation is more urgent for the endangered M. c. coronatus, as only 17% of its habitat occurs in conservation reserves in the Kimberley Region. Small populations on the northern Pentecost and Isdell Rivers are at the highest risk of extirpation, and urgently need a fine-scale targeted approach to help conserve them. A strategy that maintains connectivity across the species distribution and reduces continuing riparian degradation needs to be implemented. Suggested management actions needed at key sites are controlling access of stock and feral herbivores to riparian areas and excluding livestock from riparian zones; reducing the incidence of intense fires that affect fire-sensitive riparian vegetation by implementing improved fire-regimes; controlling the spread of weeds (by identifying and removing them); preservation of quality riparian habitat (involving both on and off-reserve protection); and restoring riparian habitat, especially in areas of high risk.

==== Conservation efforts ====
The Department of Agriculture and Food Western Australia (DAFWA) joined with Wungurr Rangers and pastoralists in the north-west Kimberley in an effort to protect parts of their habitat by removing Ornamental rubbervine (Cryptostegia madagascariensis). The Australian Wildlife Conservancy (AWC) is protecting riparian vegetation on its Mornington-Marion Downs, and Pungalina-Seven Emu sanctuaries by implementing a program of fire management (EcoFire) and introducing herbivore control. EcoFire is a landscape-scale fire management program of the central and north Kimberley (involving 11 properties covering four million hectares including indigenous communities and pastoralists), and helps protect the fire-sensitive vegetation crucial for the survival of the purple-crowned fairywren.
