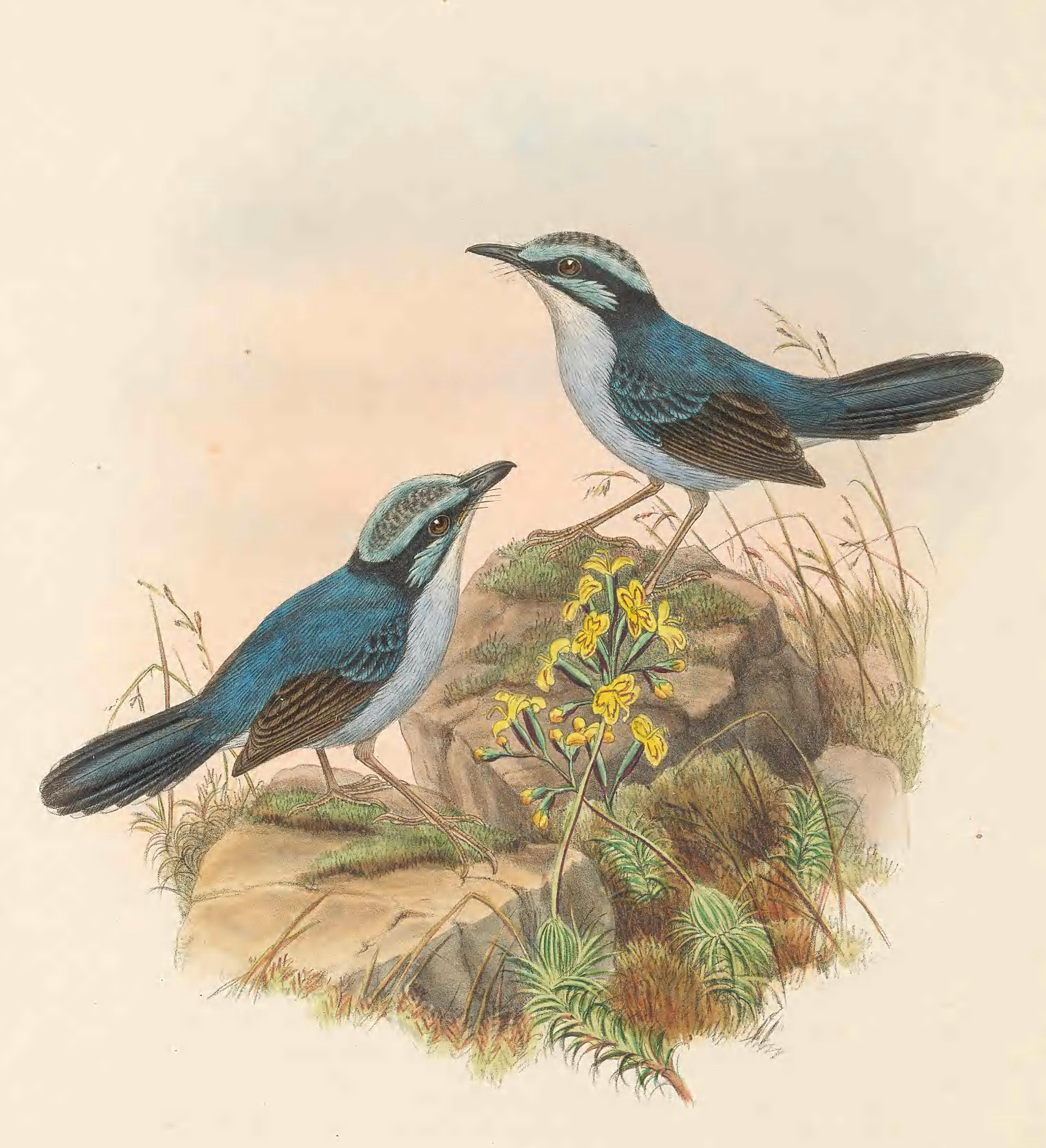

Conservation status
- Least Concern (IUCN 3.1)

Scientific classification
- Kingdom: Animalia
- Phylum: Chordata
- Class: Aves
- Order: Passeriformes
- Family: Maluridae
- Genus: Chenorhamphus
- Species: C. grayi

Binomial name
- Chenorhamphus grayi (Wallace, 1862)
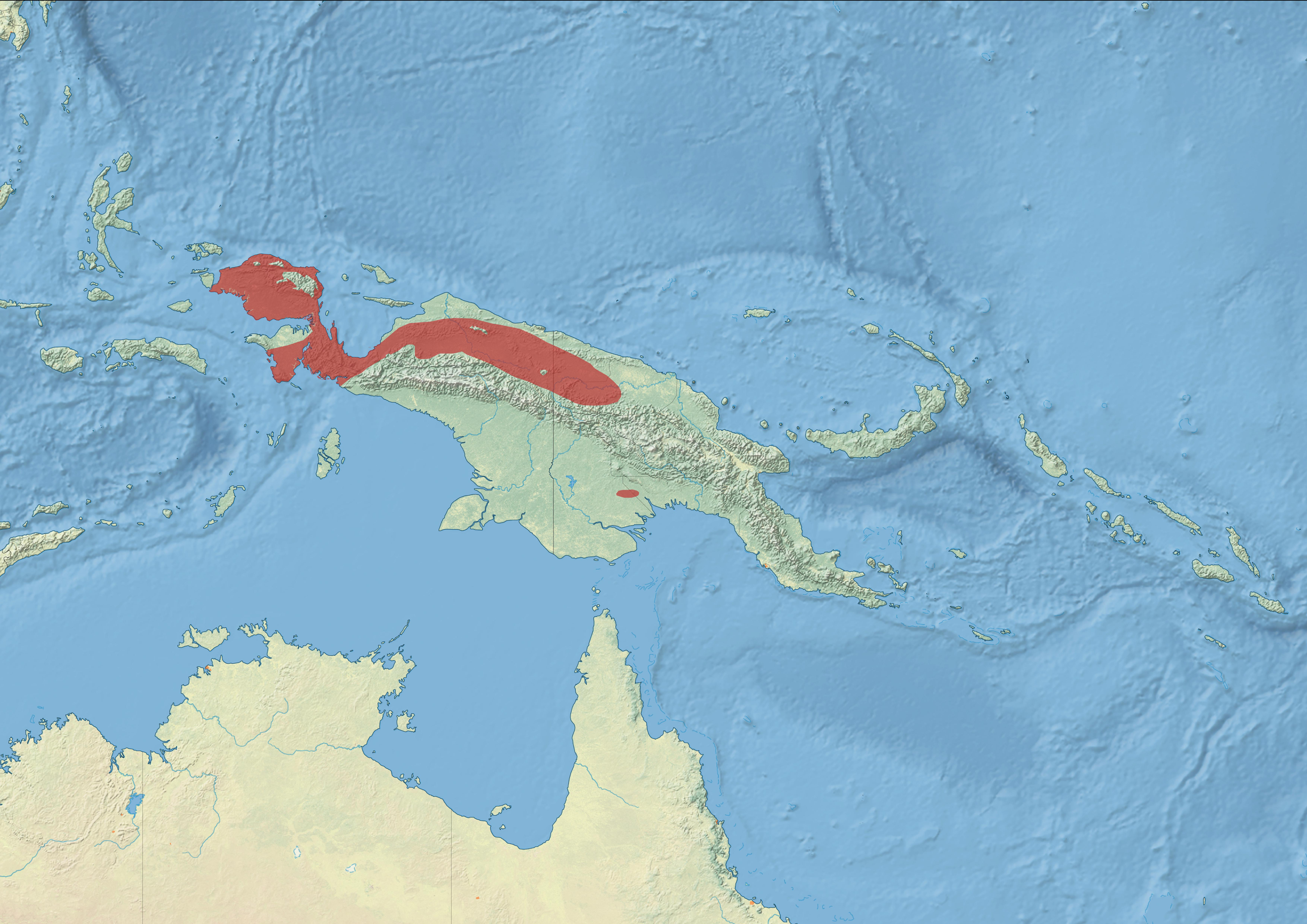

Synonyms
- Todopsis grayi; Malurus grayi

= Broad-billed fairywren =

Species of bird

The broad-billed fairywren (Chenorhamphus grayi) is a species of bird in the Australasian wren family, Maluridae. It is found in northern and north-western New Guinea. Its natural habitat is subtropical or tropical moist lowland forests.

== Taxonomy and systematics ==
The broad-billed fairywren was originally described in the obsolete genus Todopsis. It was formerly lumped together with Campbell's fairywren in the genus Malurus until a 2011 analysis of mitochondrial and nuclear DNA showed high divergence between the two subspecies resulting in them being re-split into separate species. The study also found them to lie in a clade with the genera Sipodotus and Clytomyias leading to their subsequent re-classification in their own genus, Chenorhamphus. Alternate names for the broad-billed fairywren include broad-billed wren and broad-billed wren-warbler.

== Behaviour and ecology ==
=== Diet ===
Little is known about the diet of the broad-billed fairywren, although it is thought to be insectivorous. Like other New Guinean fairywrens, the species forages on the ground and in dense undergrowth, especially around exposed tree roots. Feeding is done in the lower forest, up to 5 m.

=== Breeding ===
Males with enlarged testicles have been collected in July. Fledglings have also been found in February.

The only known nest was at a height of 50 cm (20 in) in primary forest in a 20 m (66 ft) wide ridge. It was a cavity in moss that covered a sapling's trunk, and was 8 cm (3.1 in) deep and 5 cm (2.0 in) wide. It was lined with dry needles, along with strips of bark, and contained two chicks in October.
