= Campbell's fairywren =

Scientific classification
- Kingdom: Animalia
- Phylum: Chordata
- Class: Aves
- Order: Passeriformes
- Family: Maluridae
- Genus: Chenorhamphus
- Species: C. campbelli

Binomial name
- Chenorhamphus campbelli (Schodde & Weatherly, 1982)

Synonyms
- Chenorhamphus grayi campbelli; Malurus campbelli Schodde & Weatherly, 1982; Malurus grayi campbelli Schodde & Weatherly, 1982

Species of bird

Campbell's fairywren (Chenorhamphus campbelli) is a species of oscine passerine bird belonging to the family Maluridae, the Australasian wrens. This species is endemic to Papua New Guinea.

== Taxonomy and systematics ==
Campbell's fairywren was first formally described as Malurus campbelli in 1982 by Richard Schodde and Richard Weatherly with its type locality given as Mount Bosavi, on the headwaters of the Kikori River in central New Guinea. It has been considered to be a subspecies of the broad-billed fairy wren (M. grayi) but the International Ornithological Committee now regard itas a valid species and both Campbell's fairywren and the broad-billed fairy wren are now classified in the genus Chenorhamphus. This was based on a 2011 analysis of mitochondrial and nuclear DNA showed high divergence between the two subspecies resulting in them being re-split into separate species. The study also found them to lie in a clade with the genera Sipodotus and Clytomyias leading to their subsequent re-classification in their own genus, Chenorhamphus. The genus Chenorhamphus is classified within the tribe Malurini, the fairywrens, of the subfamily Malurinae, which also includes the emu wrens, in the Australasian wren family Maluridae.

== Etymology ==
Campbell's fairywren, in both its common name and its specific name, is named after the Scottish ornithologist Robert "Rob" W. Campbell who discovered this species when trapping and ringing birds at its type locality in 1980 and 1981.

== Description ==
Campbell's fairywren has a brown back, wings and tail with light blue underparts and a light blue, rather thick supercilium. This species also has distinct black crown stripe, eyestripe and moustachial stripe. The song as a reel of gigh pitched notes.

== Distribution and habitat ==
Campbell's fairywren is endemic to Papua New Guinea where it is only known from the middle Strickland River and Mount Bosavi. Pairs or small groups forage in dense undergrowth, typically where rattan and sago grow.
