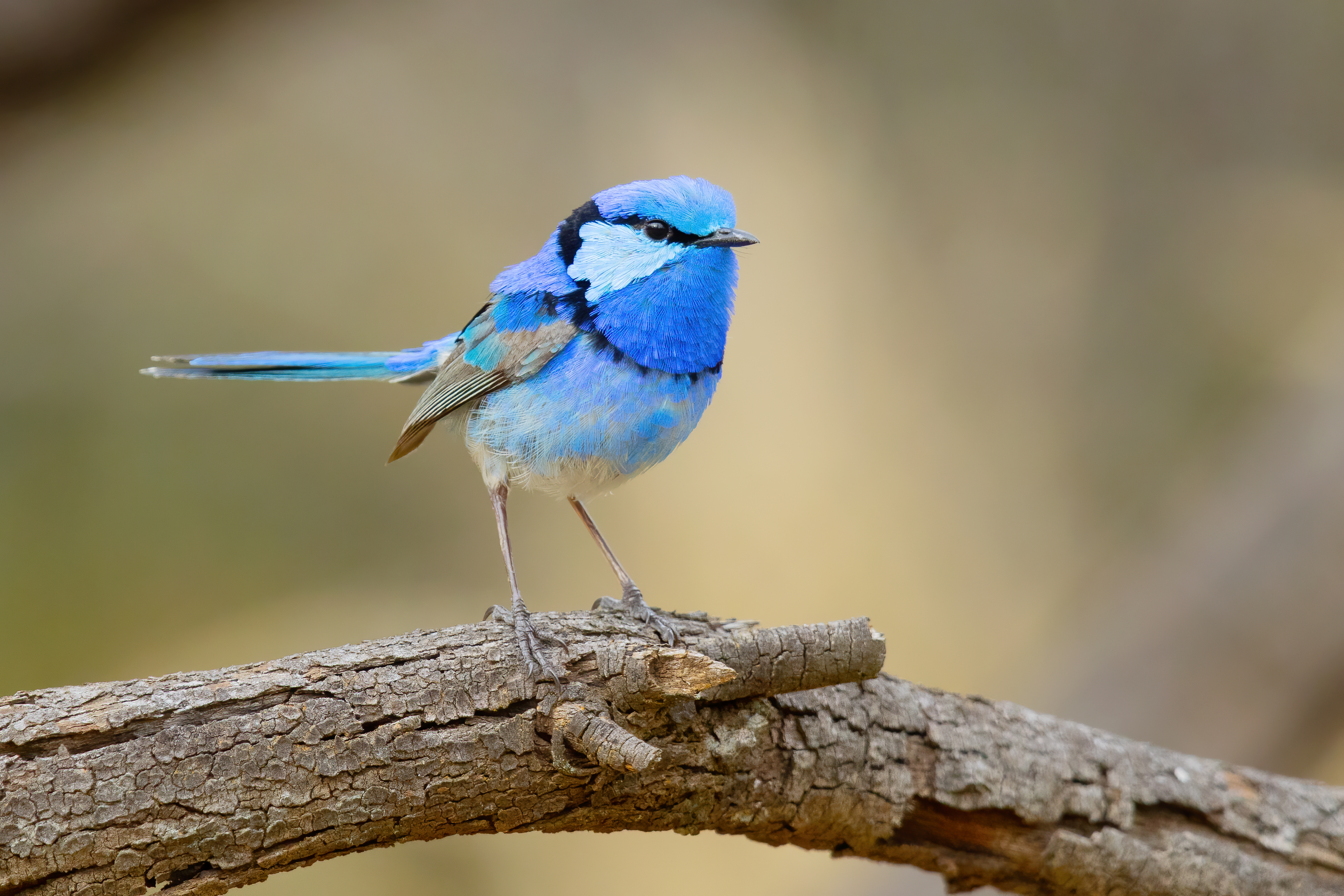
- A male splendid fairywren in New South Wales, Australia
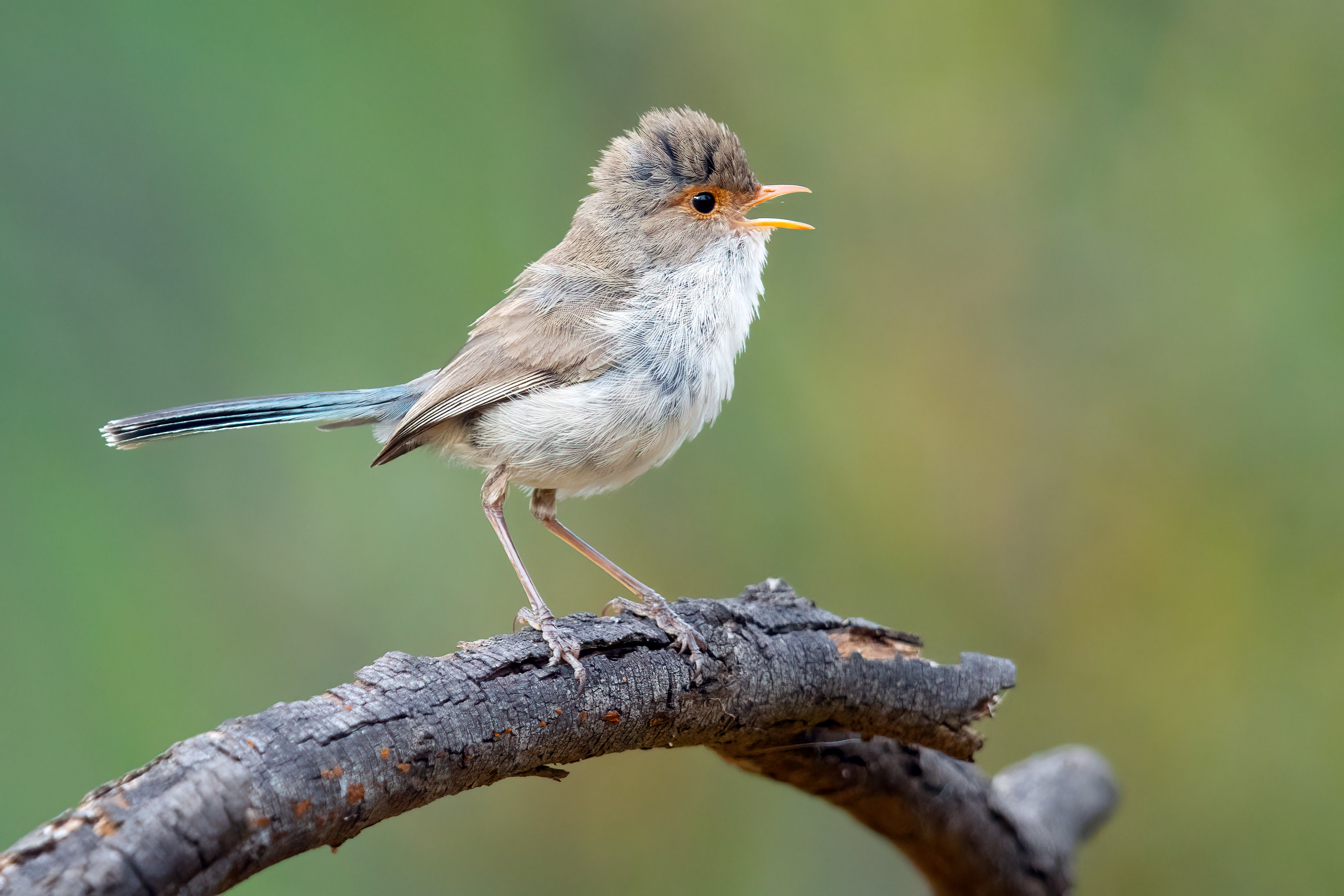
- Female

Conservation status
- Least Concern (IUCN 3.1)

Scientific classification
- Kingdom: Animalia
- Phylum: Chordata
- Class: Aves
- Order: Passeriformes
- Family: Maluridae
- Genus: Malurus
- Species: M. splendens

Binomial name
- Malurus splendens (Quoy & Gaimard, 1832)
- Splendid fairywren range

Synonyms
- Saxicola splendens; Malurus pectoralis

= Splendid fairywren =

Species of bird

The splendid fairywren (Malurus splendens) is a passerine bird in the Australasian wren family, Maluridae. It is also known simply as the splendid wren or more colloquially in Western Australia as the blue wren. The splendid fairywren is found across much of the Australian continent from central-western New South Wales and southwestern Queensland over to coastal Western Australia. It inhabits predominantly arid and semiarid regions. Exhibiting a high degree of sexual dimorphism, the male in breeding plumage is a small, long-tailed bird of predominantly bright blue and black colouration. Nonbreeding males, females, and juveniles are predominantly grey-brown in colour; this gave the early impression that males were polygamous, as all dull-coloured birds were taken for females. It comprises several similar all blue-and-black subspecies that were originally considered separate species.

Like other fairywrens, the splendid fairywren is notable for several peculiar behavioural characteristics; the birds are socially monogamous and sexually promiscuous, meaning that although they form pairs between one male and one female, each partner mates with other individuals and even assists in raising the young from such trysts. Male fairywrens pluck pink or purple petals and display them to females as part of a courtship display.

The habitat of the splendid fairywren ranges from forest to dry scrub, generally with ample vegetation for shelter. Unlike the eastern superb fairywren, it has not adapted well to human occupation of the landscape and has disappeared from some urbanised areas. The splendid fairywren mainly eats insects and supplements its diet with seeds.

== Taxonomy and systematics ==
The splendid fairywren is one of twelve species of the genus Malurus, commonly known as fairywrens, found in Australia and lowland New Guinea. Within the genus, it is most closely related to the superb fairywren. These two "blue fairywrens" are closely related to the purple-crowned fairywren of north-western Australia.

Specimens were initially collected at King George Sound, and the splendid fairywren was described as Saxicola splendens by French naturalists Jean René Constant Quoy and Joseph Paul Gaimard in 1830. Three years later, John Gould gave it the scientific name of Malurus pectoralis and the vernacular name of banded superb-warbler. Though he correctly placed it in the genus Malurus, the specific name of the former authors took priority. The specific epithet is derived from the Latin splendens, which means "shining". Like other fairywrens, the splendid fairywren is unrelated to the true wren. It was first classified as a member of the Old World flycatcher family Muscicapidae by Richard Bowdler Sharpe, though it was later placed in the warbler family Sylviidae by the same author, before being placed in the newly recognised family Maluridae in 1975. More recently, DNA analysis has shown the family Maluridae to be related to the family Meliphagidae (the honeyeaters) and the family Pardalotidae within a large superfamily, Meliphagoidea.

=== Subspecies ===
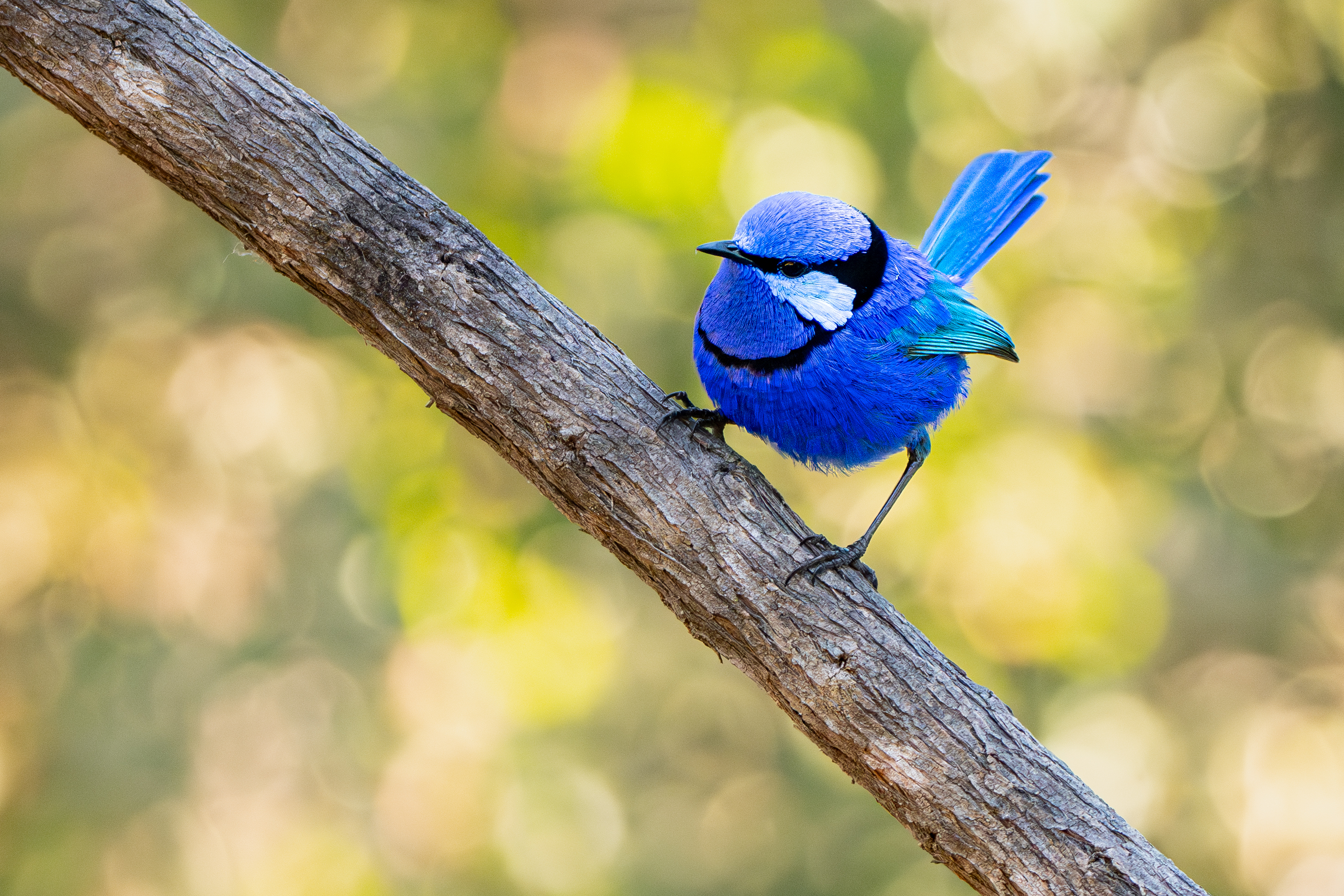
Male M. s. splendens in full breeding plumage, Yanchep National Park, Perth

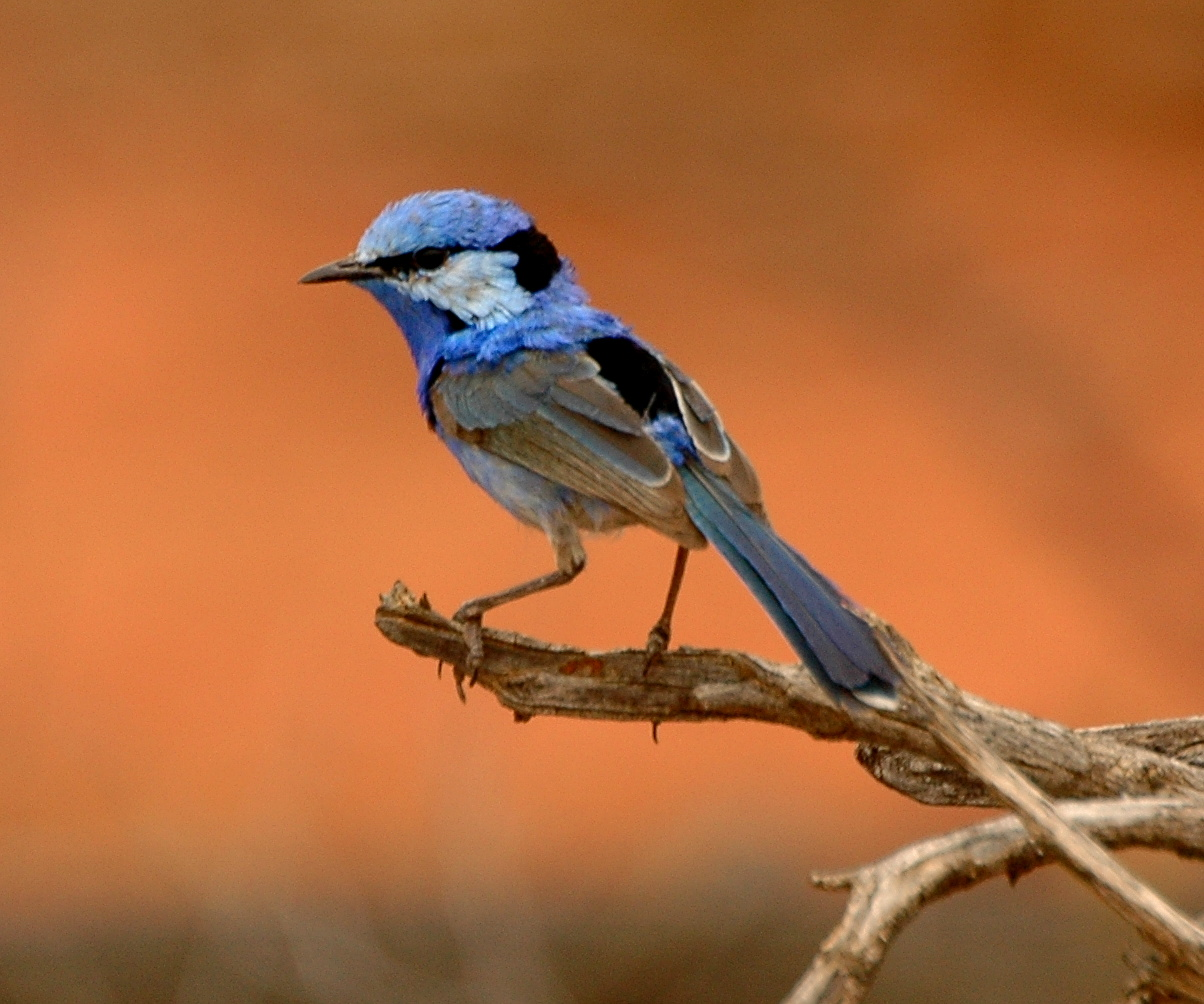
Male M. s. melanotus Cunnamulla, SW Queensland

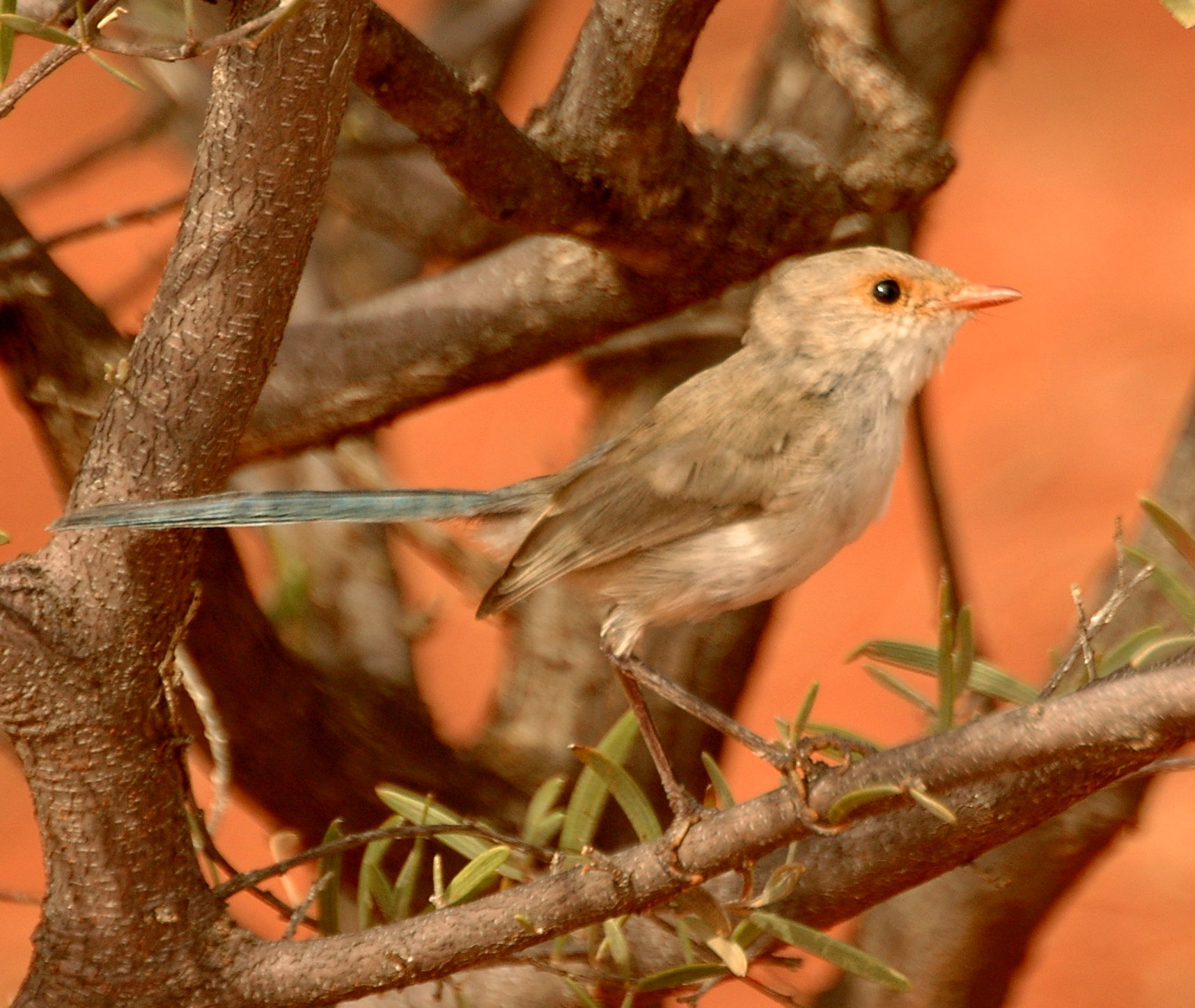
Female M. s. melanotus Cunnamulla, SW Queensland

Initially, three of the subspecies were considered separate species because they were described as having non-overlapping ranges. However, as the interior of Australia was explored, it became apparent there were areas of hybridisation where subspecies overlapped. Thus in 1975, they were reclassified as subspecies of the splendid fairywren. Four subspecies are currently accepted, but recent genetic evidence suggests the original treatment as three species was correct, and it is likely to be restored in the future.

- Banded fairywren (M. s. splendens, syn. Malurus splendens s.str.) – (Quoy & Gaimard, 1830). Also named the banded wren or banded blue wren. This is the nominate subspecies and is found in much of central and southern Western Australia.
- Turquoise fairywren (M. s. callainus, syn. Malurus callainus) – Gould, 1867: Originally collected by ornithologist Samuel White and described as a separate species by John Gould. Although the taxonomy is not yet settled, it is now considered to include the former subspecies musgravei described in 1922 by amateur ornithologist Gregory Mathews from the Lake Eyre Basin in central Australia. Also named the turquoise wren. It is found in mulga and mallee country across much of South Australia and the southern Northern Territory. It has lighter blue or turquoise upperparts than the splendid fairywren, as well as a black rump.
- Black-backed fairywren (M. s. melanotus, syn. Malurus melanotus) – Gould, 1841: Originally described as a separate species. Also named the black-backed wren, it is found in the mallee country of South Australia (Sedan area north-east of Adelaide) through western Victoria, western New South Wales and into south-western Queensland. It differs from the nominate subspecies in having a black back and whitish lower belly.
- M. s. emmottorum – Schodde & Mason, IJ, 1999: Named after Angus Emmott, a farmer and amateur biologist from western Queensland. It is found in south-western Queensland. In the event of a three-way split of the splendid fairywren, this subspecies would become Malurus melanotus emmottorum.

=== Evolutionary history ===
In his 1982 monograph, ornithologist Richard Schodde proposed a southern origin for the common ancestor of the superb and splendid fairywrens. At some time in the past, it was split into south-western (splendid) and south-eastern (superb) enclaves. As the southwest was drier than the southeast, once conditions were more favourable, the splendid forms were more able to spread into inland areas. These split into at least three enclaves, which subsequently evolved in isolation in the following drier glacial periods until the current more favourable climate saw them expand once again and interbreed where they overlap. This suggests the original split was only very recent, as the forms had insufficient time to speciate. Further molecular studies may result in this hypothesis being modified. A 2017 genetic study using both mitochondrial and nuclear DNA found the ancestors of the superb and splendid fairywrens diverged from each other around 4 million years ago, and their common ancestor diverged around 7 million years ago from a lineage that gave rise to the white-shouldered, white-winged, and red-backed fairywrens.

== Description ==
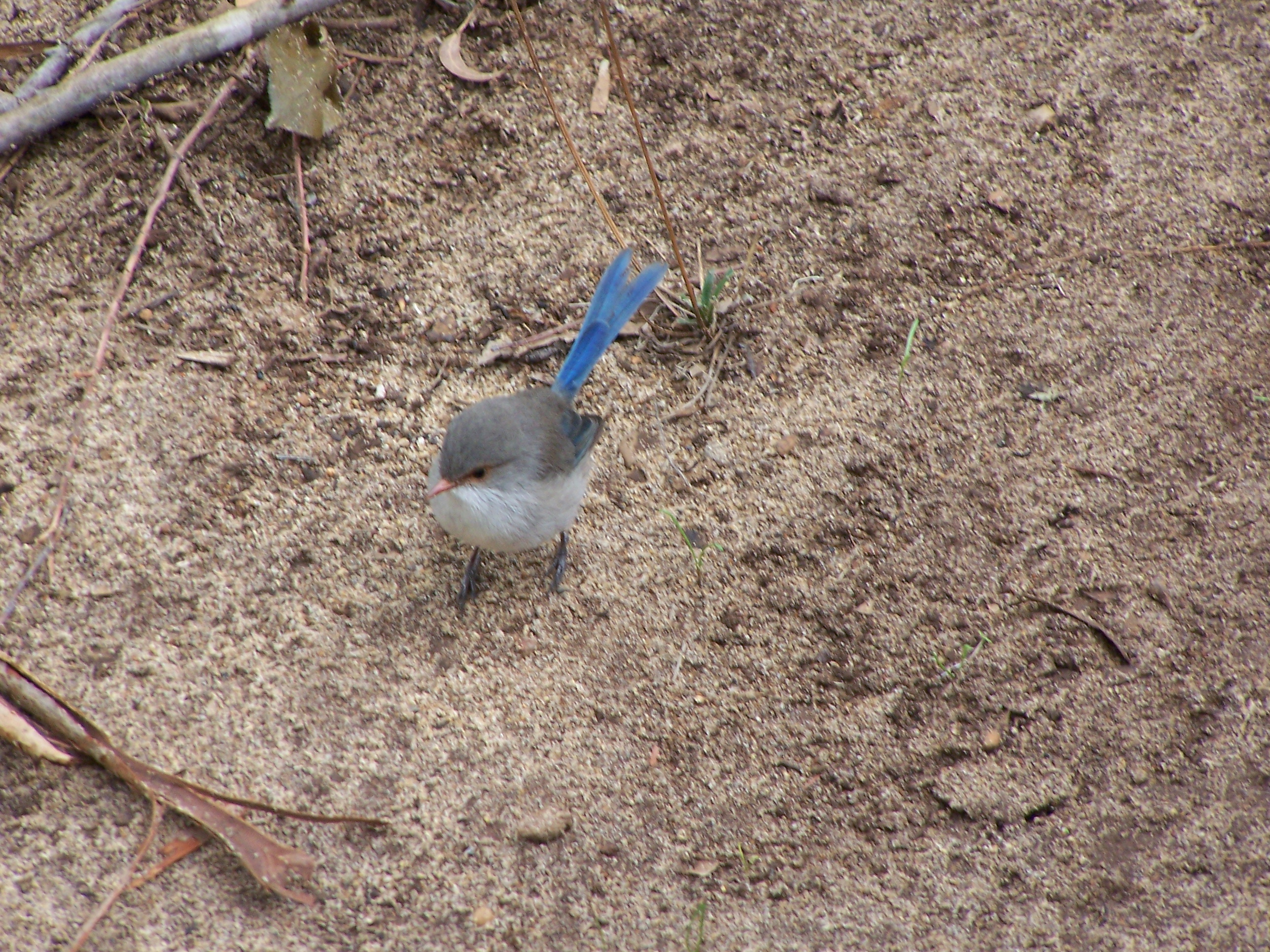
M. s. splendens female, showing chestnut bill and bluish tail

The splendid fairywren is a small, long-tailed bird 14 cm (5.5 in) long. Exhibiting a high degree of sexual dimorphism, the breeding male is distinctive with a bright blue forehead and ear coverts, a violet throat, and deeper rich blue back wings, chest, and tail with a black bill, eye band, and chest band. The blue breeding plumage of the male is often referred to as nuptial plumage. The non-breeding male is brown with blue in the wings and a bluish tail. The female resembles the non-breeding male but has a chestnut bill and eye-patch. Immature males moult into breeding plumage the first breeding season after hatching, though this may be incomplete with residual brownish plumage and may take another year or two to perfect. Both sexes moult in autumn after breeding, with males assuming an eclipse nonbreeding plumage. They moult again into nuptial plumage in winter or spring. Some older males have remained blue all year, moulting directly from one year's nuptial plumage to the next. Breeding males' blue plumage, particularly the ear coverts, is highly iridescent due to the flattened and twisted surface of the barbules. The blue plumage also reflects ultraviolet light strongly, so may be even more prominent to other fairywrens, whose colour vision extends into this part of the spectrum. The call is described as a gushing reel, which is harsher and louder than other fairywrens and varies from individual to individual. A soft single trrt serves as a contact call within a foraging group, while the alarm call is a tsit. Cuckoos and other intruders may be greeted with a threat posture and churring threat. Females emit a purr while brooding.

== Distribution and habitat ==
The splendid fairywren is widely distributed in the arid and semiarid zones of Australia. Its habitat is typically dry and shrubby, and includes mulga and mallee in drier parts of the country and forested areas in the southwest. The western subspecies M. s. splendens and eastern black-backed fairywren (subspecies M. s. melanotus) are largely sedentary, although the turquoise fairywren (subspecies musgravei) is thought to be partially nomadic. Unlike the eastern superb fairywren, the splendid fairywren has not adapted well to human occupation of the landscape and has disappeared from some urbanised areas. Forestry plantations of pine (Pinus spp.) and eucalypts are also unsuitable as they lack undergrowth.

== Behaviour and ecology ==
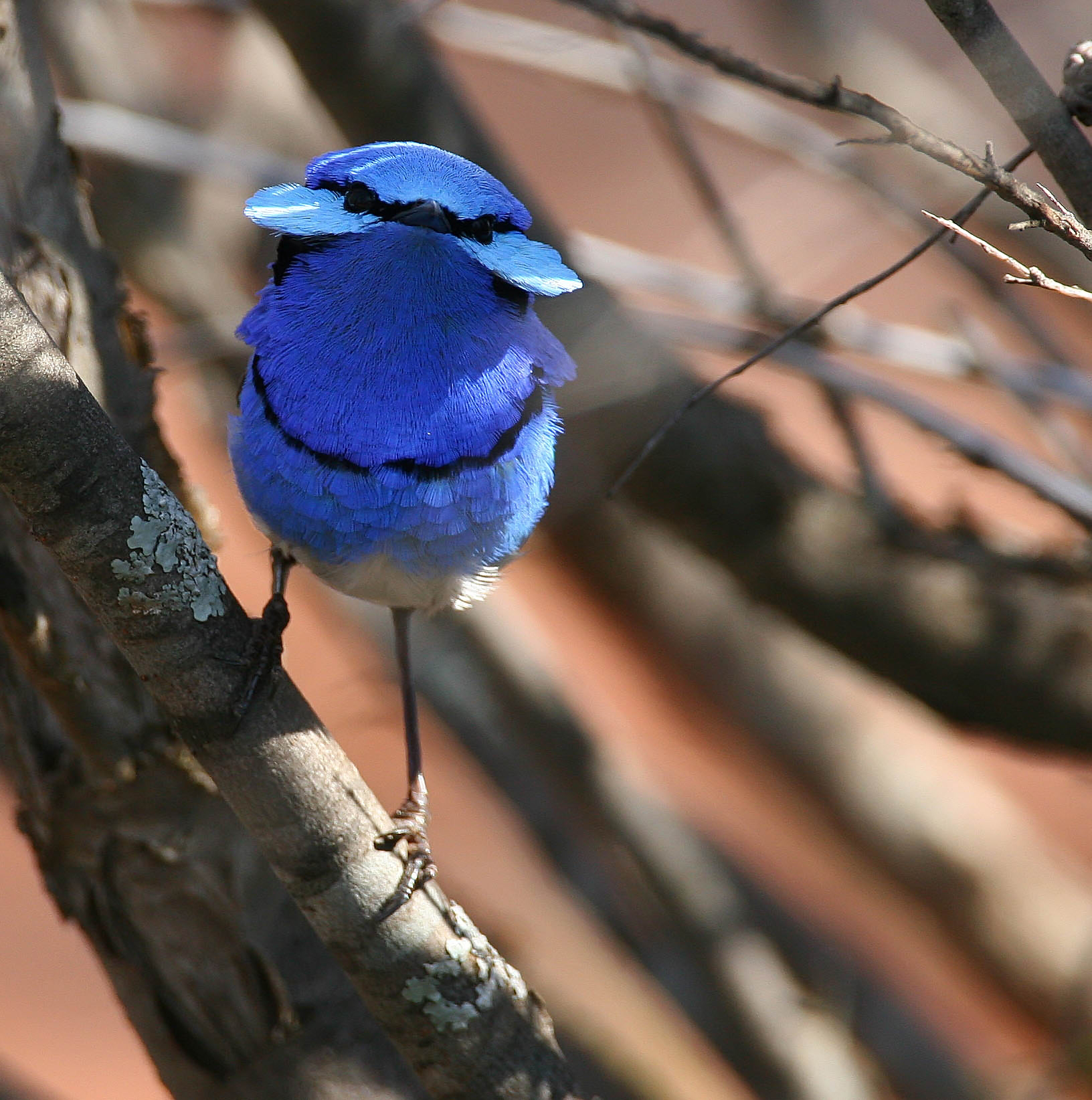
M. s. melanotus with face fan display, Lake Cargelligo

Like all fairywrens, the splendid fairywren is an active and restless feeder, particularly on open ground near shelter, but also through the lower foliage. Movement is a series of jaunty hops and bounces, with its balance assisted by a proportionally large tail, which is usually held upright and rarely still. The short, rounded wings provide good initial lift and are useful for short flights, though not for extended jaunts. However, splendid fairywrens are stronger fliers than most other fairywrens. During spring and summer, birds are active in bursts through the day and accompany their foraging with song. Insects are numerous and easy to catch, which allows the birds to rest between forays. The group often shelters and rests together during the heat of the day. Food is harder to find during winter and they are required to spend the day foraging continuously.

Groups of two to eight splendid fairywrens remain in their territory and defend it year-round. Territories average 4.4 ha (11 acres) in woodland-heath areas; size decreases with increasing density of vegetation and increases with the number of males in the group. The group consists of a socially monogamous pair along with one or more male or female helper birds that were hatched in the territory, though they may not necessarily be the offspring of the main pair. Splendid fairywrens are sexually promiscuous, each partner mating with other individuals and even assisting in raising the young from such trysts. Over a third of offspring are the result of an "extramarital" mating. Helper birds assist in defending the territory and feeding and rearing the young. Birds in a group roost side-by-side in dense cover as well as engaging in mutual preening.

Major nest predators include Australian magpies (Gymnorhina tibicen), butcherbirds (Cracticus spp.), laughing kookaburra (Dacelo novaeguineae), currawongs (Strepera spp.), crows and ravens (Corvus spp.), and shrike-thrushes (Colluricincla spp.), as well as introduced mammals such as the red fox (Vulpes vulpes), cat (Felis catus), and black rat (Rattus rattus). Like other species of fairywrens, splendid fairywrens may use a "rodent-run" display to distract predators from nests with young birds. While doing this, the head, neck, and tail of the bird are lowered, the wings are held out, and the feathers are fluffed as the bird runs rapidly and voices a continuous alarm call.

=== Courtship ===
Several courtship displays by splendid fairywren males have been recorded; the "sea horse flight", so named for the similarity of movements to those by a seahorse, is an exaggerated, undulating flight where the male, with his neck extended and his head feathers erect, flies and tilts his body from horizontal to vertical and by rapidly beating wings is able to descend slowly and spring upwards after alighting on the ground. The "face fan" display may be seen as a part of aggressive or sexual display behaviours; it involves the flaring of the blue ear tufts by erecting the feathers.

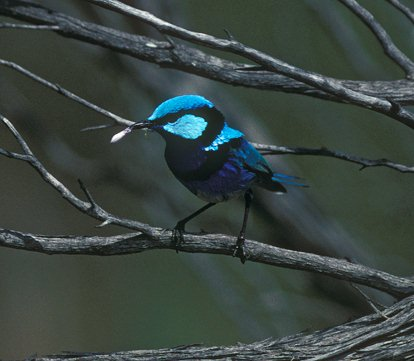
Turquoise fairywren (M. s. callainus) with purplish petal – Gawler Ranges, South Australia

Another courtship habit of males of this and other fairywren species during the reproductive season is to pluck petals (in this species, predominantly pink and purple ones, which contrast with their plumage) and show them to females. Petals often form part of a courtship display and are presented to a female in the male fairywren's own or another territory. Outside the breeding season, males may sometimes still show petals to females in other territories, presumably to promote themselves. Fairywrens notably are socially monogamous and sexually promiscuous; pairs bond for life, but regularly mate with other individuals, and a proportion of young will have been fathered by males from outside the group. Young are often raised not by the pair alone, but with other males that also mated with the pair's female assisting. Thus, petal-carrying might be a behaviour that strengthens the pair bond. Petal carrying might also be a way for extra males to gain matings with the female. In either case, the data do not strongly link petal-carrying and presenting to a copulation soon thereafter.

Male splendid fairywrens sing display-like vocalizations (type II song) in response to predator calls. The trills "hitchhike" on the predator's vocalization and the female splendid fairywrens, which have become more alert due to the predator calls, also respond more strongly to this type II song than when it is given without a predator call preceding it.

=== Breeding ===
Breeding occurs from late August through to January, though heavy rain in August may delay this. The nest is built by the female; it is a round or domed structure made of loosely woven grasses and spider webs, with an entrance in one side close to the ground and well-concealed in thick and often thorny vegetation, such as Acacia pulchella or a species of Hakea. One or two broods may be laid during the breeding season. A clutch of two to four dull white eggs with reddish-brown splotches and spots, measuring 12 mm × 16 mm (0.47 in × 0.63 in), are laid. Incubation takes about two weeks. The female incubates the eggs for 14 or 15 days; after hatching, nestlings are fed and their fecal sacs are removed by all group members for 10–13 days, by which time they are fledged. Young birds remain in the family group as helpers for a year or more before moving to another group, usually an adjacent one, or assuming a dominant position in the original group. In this role they feed and care for subsequent broods.

Splendid fairywrens also commonly play host to the brood parasite, Horsfield's bronze cuckoo (Chalcites basalis), with the shining bronze cuckoo (Chalcites lucidus) also recorded.

=== Feeding ===
The splendid fairywren is predominantly insectivorous; its diet includes a wide range of small creatures, mostly arthropods such as ants, grasshoppers, crickets, spiders, and bugs. This is supplemented by small quantities of seeds, flowers, and fruit. They mostly forage on the ground or in shrubs that are less than 2 m above the ground; this has been termed hop-searching. Unusually for fairywrens, they may also occasionally forage in the canopy of flowering gums. Birds tend to stick fairly close to cover and forage in groups, as this foraging practice does render them vulnerable to a range of predators. Food can be scarce in winter, and ants are an important last resort option, constituting a much higher proportion of the diet. Adult fairywrens feed their young a different diet, conveying larger items such as caterpillars and grasshoppers to nestlings.

== Cultural depictions ==
The bird was intended to be illustrated on an Australia Post 45c prestamped envelope released on 12 August 1999; however, a superb fairywren was mistakenly illustrated instead.
