= Todopsis =

Genus of birds

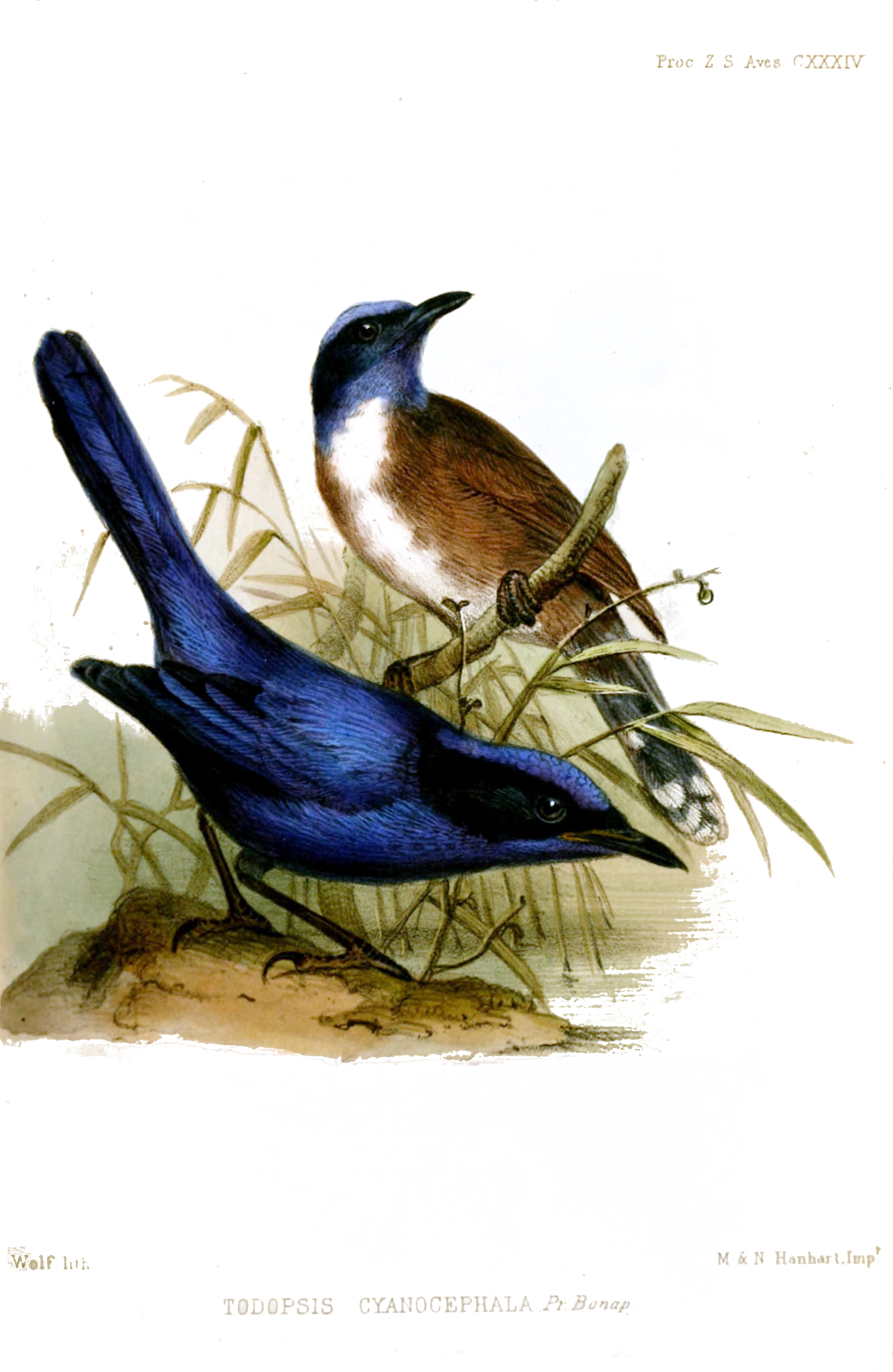
Todopsis cyanocephala

Todopsis is a former genus of fly-catching wrens. The following species were formerly classified within the genus Todopsis:

- Wallace's fairywren (as Todopsis wallacii and Todopsis coronatus)
- Broad-billed fairywren (as Todopsis grayi)
- Emperor fairywren (as Todopsis cyanocephala)
- Emperor fairywren (mysorensis) (as Todopsis mysorensis)
- Emperor fairywren (bonapartii) (as Todopsis bonapartii)
