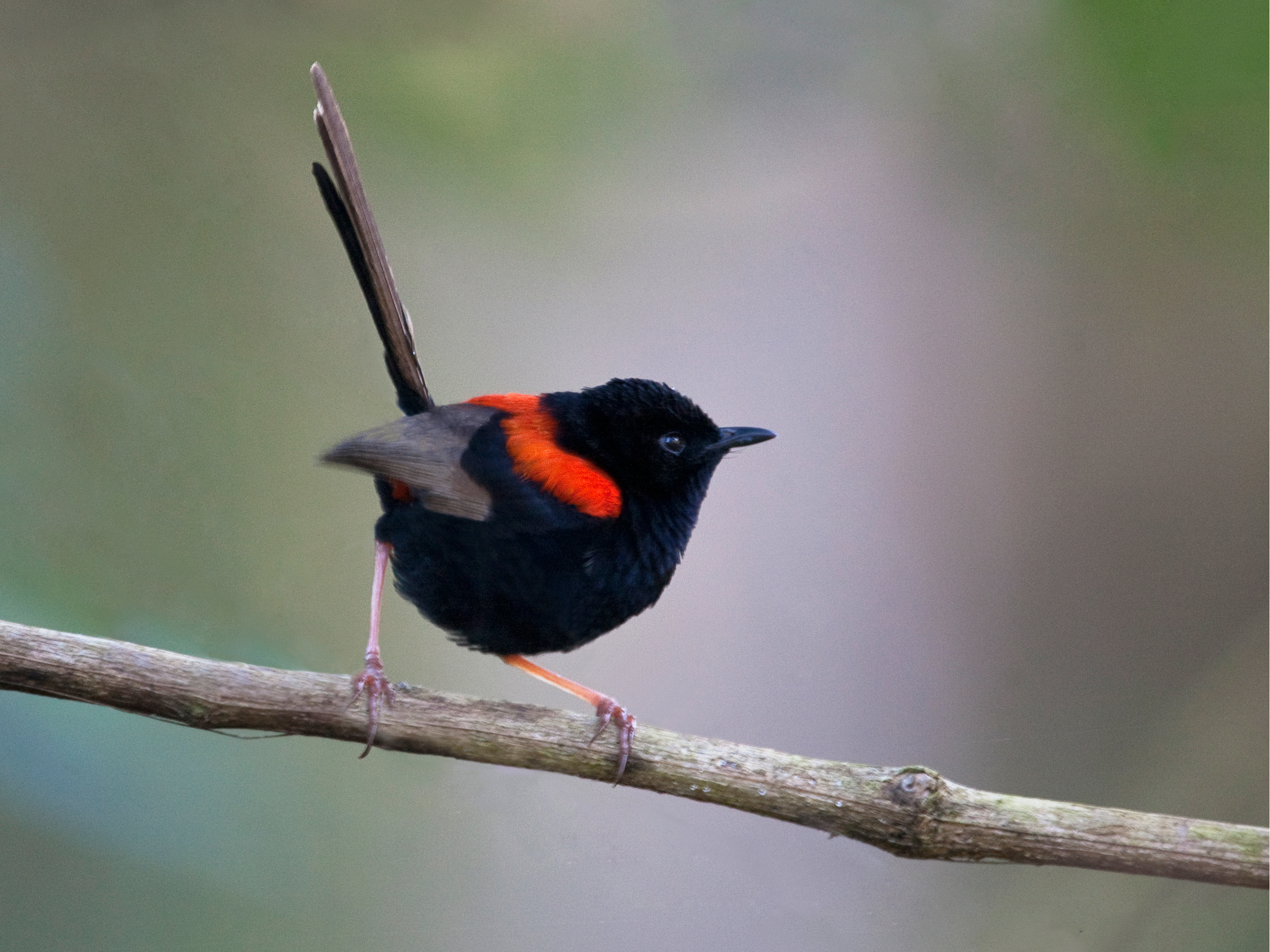
- Male
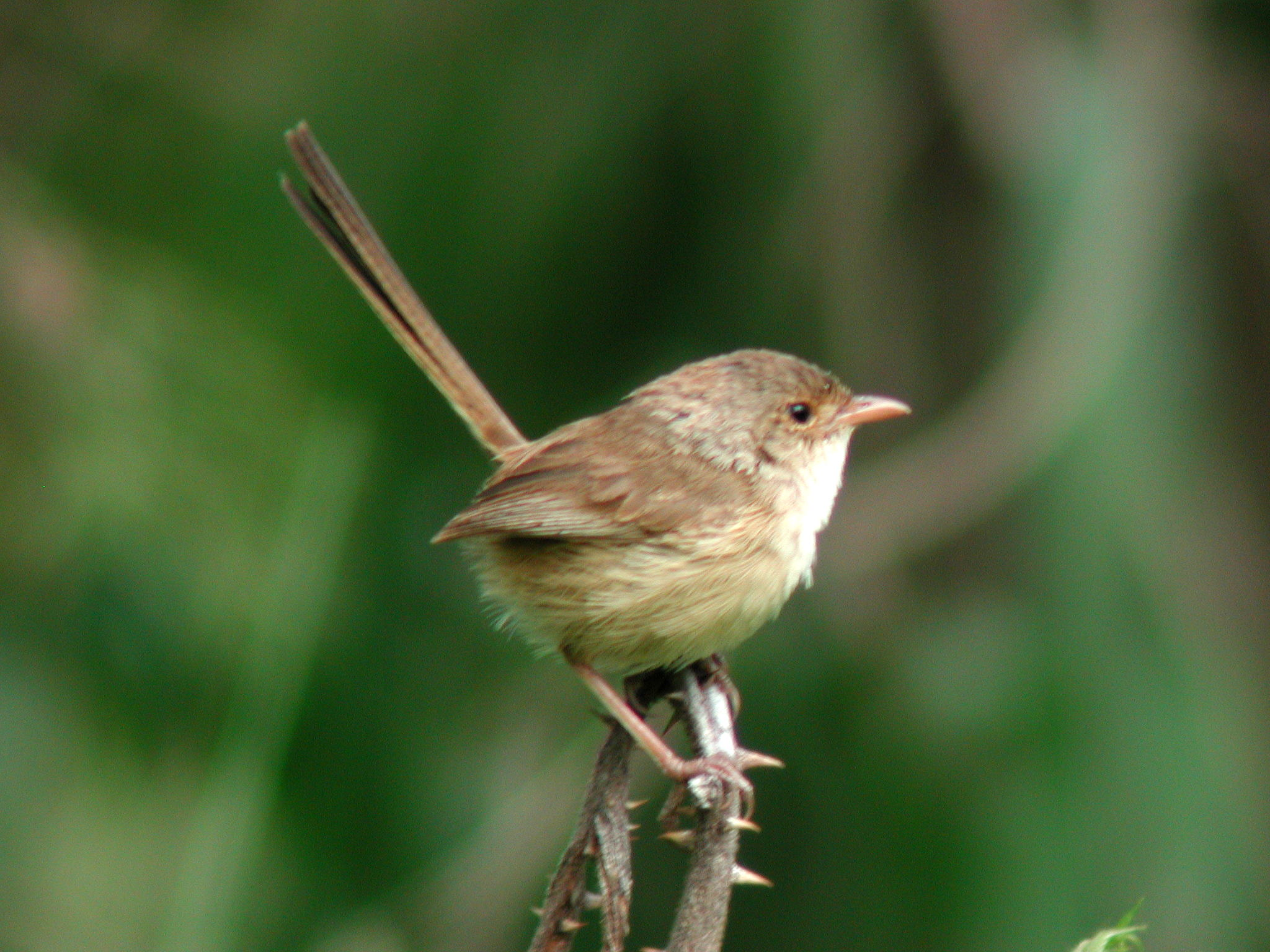
- Female at Samsonvale, SE Queensland

Conservation status
- Least Concern (IUCN 3.1)

Scientific classification
- Kingdom: Animalia
- Phylum: Chordata
- Class: Aves
- Order: Passeriformes
- Family: Maluridae
- Genus: Malurus
- Species: M. melanocephalus

Binomial name
- Malurus melanocephalus (Latham, 1801)

Subspecies
- M. m. melanocephalus; M. m. cruentatus
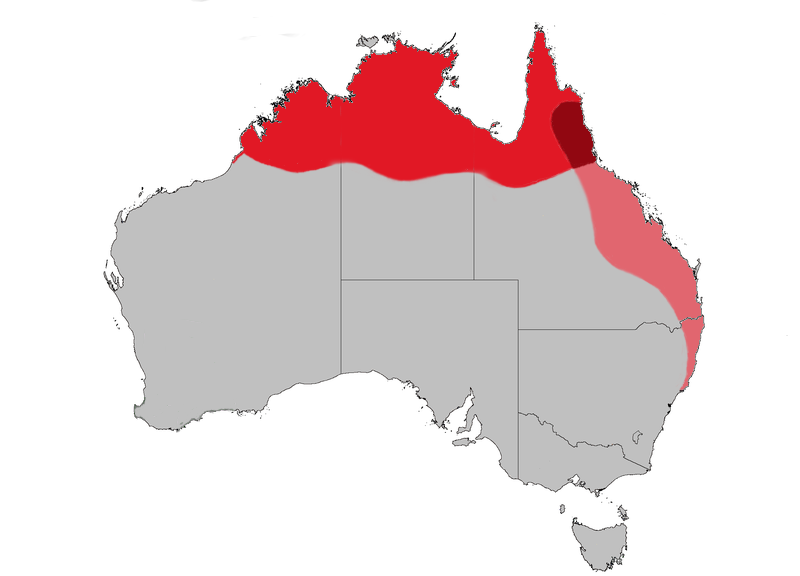
- Red-backed fairywren range: M. m. melanocephalus M. m. cruentatus Broad hybrid zone

Synonyms
- Muscicapa melanocephala; Sylvia dorsalis; Malurus brownii; Malurus cruentatus; Malurus pyrrhonotus

= Red-backed fairywren =

Passerine bird in the Australasian wren family

The red-backed fairywren (Malurus melanocephalus) is a species of passerine bird in the Australasian wren family, Maluridae. It is endemic to Australia and can be found near rivers and coastal areas along the northern and eastern coastlines from the Kimberley in the northwest to the Hunter Region in New South Wales. The male adopts a striking breeding plumage, with a black head, upperparts and tail, and a brightly coloured red back and brown wings. The female has brownish upperparts and paler underparts. The male in eclipse plumage and the juvenile resemble the female. Some males remain in non-breeding plumage while breeding. Two subspecies are recognised; the nominate M. m. melanocephalus of eastern Australia has a longer tail and orange back, and the short-tailed M. m. cruentatus from northern Australia has a redder back.

The red-backed fairywren mainly eats insects, and supplements its diet with seed and small fruit. The preferred habitat is heathland and savannah, particularly where low shrubs and tall grasses provide cover. It can be nomadic in areas where there are frequent bushfires, although pairs or small groups of birds maintain and defend territories year-round in other parts of its range. Groups consist of a socially monogamous pair with one or more helper birds who assist in raising the young. These helpers are progeny that have attained sexual maturity yet remain with the family group for one or more years after fledging. The red-backed fairywren is sexually promiscuous, and each partner may mate with other individuals and even assist in raising the young from such pairings. Older males in breeding plumage are more likely to engage in this behaviour than are those breeding in eclipse plumage. As part of a courtship display, the male wren plucks red petals from flowers and displays them to females.

== Taxonomy and systematics ==
The red-backed fairywren was first collected from the vicinity of Port Stephens in New South Wales and described by ornithologist John Latham in 1801 as the black-headed flycatcher (Muscicapa melanocephala); its specific epithet derived from the Ancient Greek μέλας, melas 'black' and κεφαλή, kephalē 'head'. However, the specimen used by Latham was a male in partial moult, with mixed black and brown plumage and an orange back, and he named it for its black head. A male in full adult plumage was described as Sylvia dorsalis, and the explorers Nicholas Aylward Vigors and Thomas Horsfield gave a third specimen from central Queensland the name Malurus brownii, honouring botanist Robert Brown. John Gould described Malurus cruentatus in 1840 from a short-tailed scarlet-backed specimen collected in Northwestern Australia by Benjamin Bynoe aboard HMS Beagle on its third voyage. The first three names were synonymised into Malurus melanocephalus by Gould who maintained his form as a separate species. An intermediate form from north Queensland was described as pyrrhonotus. Ornithologist Tom Iredale proposed the common name "elfin-wren" in 1939; however, this was not taken up.

Like other fairywrens, the red-backed fairywren is unrelated to the true wren family, Troglodytidae. It was previously classified as a member of the old world flycatcher family, Muscicapidae, and later as a member of the warbler family, Sylviidae before being placed in the newly recognised Australasian wren family, Maluridae in 1975. More recently, DNA analysis has shown that the family Maluridae is related to both the Meliphagidae (honeyeaters), and the Pardalotidae (pardalotes, scrubwrens, thornbills, gerygones and allies) within the large superfamily Meliphagoidea.

It is one of eleven species in the genus Malurus and is closely related to both the Australian white-winged fairywren, and the white-shouldered fairywren of New Guinea. Termed the bicoloured wrens by ornithologist Richard Schodde, these three species are notable for their lack of head patterns and ear tufts, and solid-coloured black or blue plumage with contrasting shoulder or wing colour; they replace each other geographically across northern Australia and New Guinea.

=== Subspecies ===
George Mack, ornithologist of the National Museum of Victoria, was the first to classify the three forms melanocephalus, cruentatus and pyrrhonotus as one species, although Richard Schodde reclassified pyrrhonotus as a hybrid from a broad hybrid zone in North Queensland; this area is bounded by the Burdekin, Endeavour and Norman Rivers. Breeding males of intermediate plumage, larger and scarlet-backed, or smaller and orange-backed, as well as forms that resemble one of the two parent subspecies, are all encountered within the hybrid zone. A molecular study published in 2008 focusing on the Cape York population found it was genetically closer to eastern forest populations than to those from the Top End. The Cape York birds became segregated around 0.27 million years ago, but gene flow still continues with eastern birds.

Two subspecies are currently recognised:

- M. m. cruentatus - Gould, 1840: Originally described as a separate species, the specific epithet cruentatus (bloodstained) is derived from the Latin verb cruentare 'to stain with blood'. It is found across northern Australia from the Kimberleys to northern Queensland and is smaller than the nominate subspecies with males averaging 7.1 grams (0.25 oz) and females 6.6 g (0.23 oz) in weight. Males in breeding plumage on Melville Island have a deeper crimson colour to their back.
- M. m. melanocephalus - (Latham, 1801): The nominate subspecies, it has an orange back and longer tail and is found from northern coastal New South Wales through to northern Queensland. This form has previously been called the orange-backed fairywren.

=== Evolutionary history ===
Ornithologist Richard Schodde has proposed that the ancestors of the two subspecies were separated during the last glacial period in the Pleistocene around 12,000 years ago. Aridity had pushed the grasslands preferred by the wren to the north, and with subsequent wetter warmer conditions it once again spread southwards and met the eastern form in northern Queensland and intermediate forms arose. The distribution of the three bi-coloured fairywren species indicates their ancestors lived across New Guinea and northern Australia in a period when sea levels were lower and the two regions were joined by a land bridge. Populations then became separated as sea levels rose, and New Guinea birds evolved into the white-shouldered fairywren, while Australian forms evolved into the red-backed fairywren and the arid-adapted white-winged fairywren. A 2017 genetic study using both mitochondrial and nuclear DNA found the ancestors of the red-backed and white-shouldered fairywrens diverged from each other around 3 million years ago, and their common ancestor diverged around 5 million years ago from a lineage that gave rise to the white-winged fairywren.

== Description ==
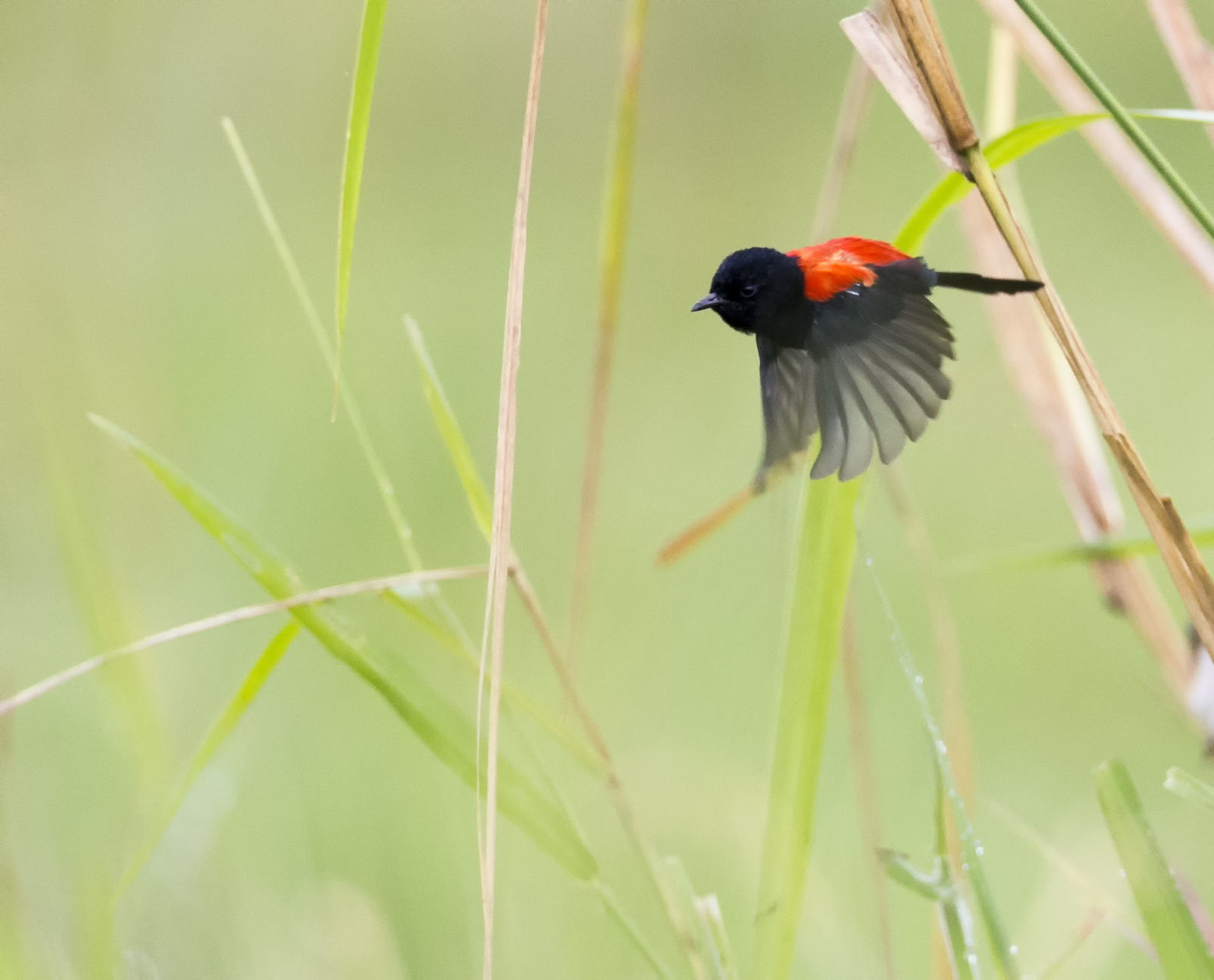
Male in flight

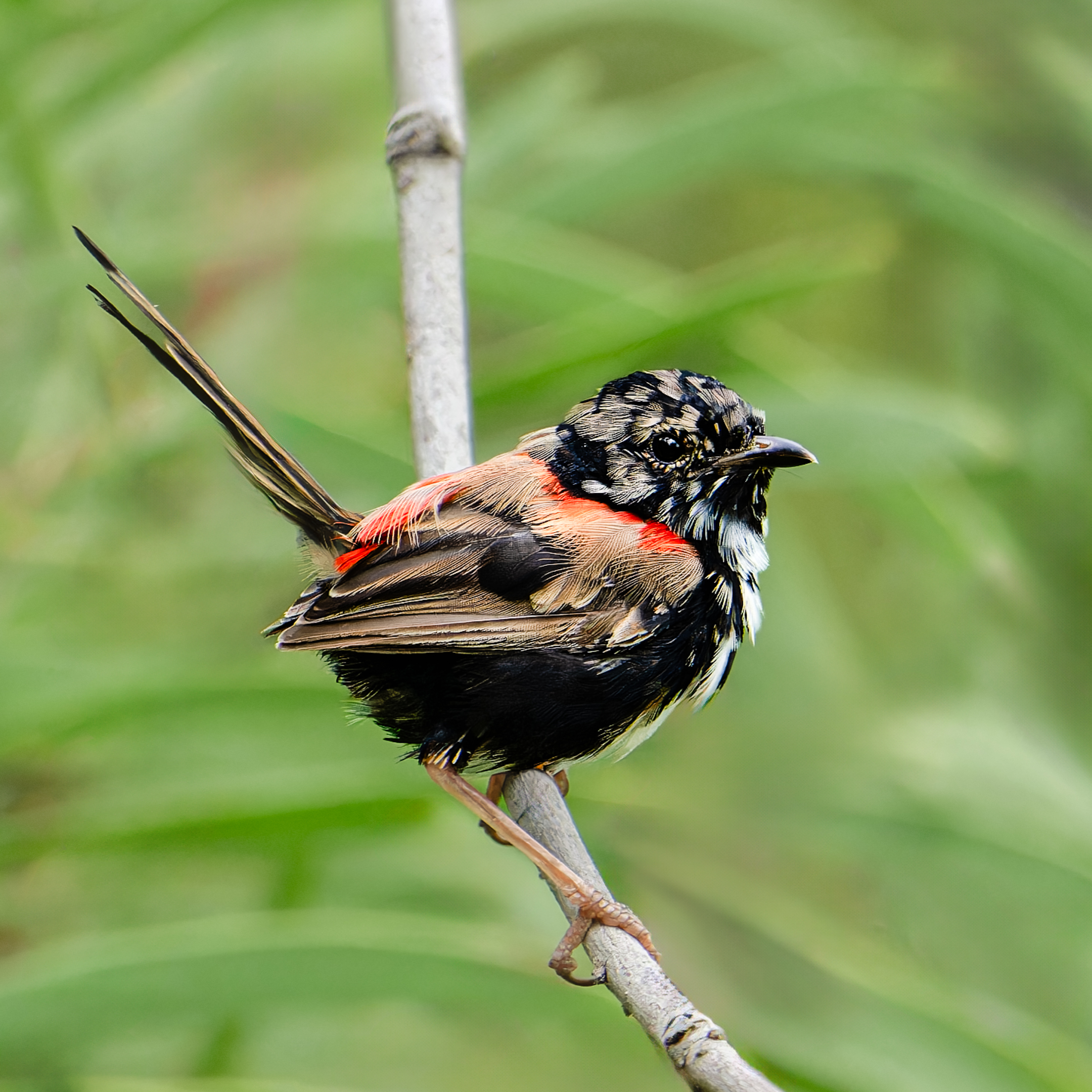
Eclipse plumage of male

The smallest member of the genus Malurus, the red-backed fairywren measures 11.5 centimetres (4.5 in) and weighs 5–10 g (0.18–0.35 oz), averaging around 8 g (0.28 oz). The tail is approximately 6 centimetres (2.4 in) long and is black in the breeding male, and brown in eclipse males, females, and juvenile birds. Averaging 8.6 mm (0.3 in), the bill is relatively long, narrow, pointed, and wider at the base. Wider than it is deep, the bill is similar in shape to those of other birds that feed by probing or picking insects off of their environs.

Like other fairywrens, the red-backed fairywren is notable for its marked sexual dimorphism; the male adopts full breeding plumage by the fourth year, later than all other fairywrens apart from the closely related white-winged fairywren. The male in breeding plumage has a black head and body with striking red back and brown wings. At other times it has a brown upper body and white underparts. Some males, mainly younger, remain in eclipse plumage while breeding. The female looks remarkably similar with a buff brown body and a yellowish spot under the eye. The female of this species differs from those of other fairywren species in that it lacks a blue tint in the tail. Geographically, it follows Gloger's rule; female birds have whiter bellies and paler brown upperparts inland in sunnier climates. Juveniles of both sexes look very similar to females.

=== Vocalizations ===
The typical song used by the red-backed fairywren to advertise its territory is similar to that of other fairywrens, namely a reel made up of an introductory note followed by repeated short segments of song, starting weak and soft and ending high and shrill with several syllables. The call is mostly made by the male during mating season. Birds will communicate with one another while foraging with a soft ssst, barely audible further than 10–15 m (33–49 ft) away. The alarm call is a high-pitched zit.

== Distribution and habitat ==
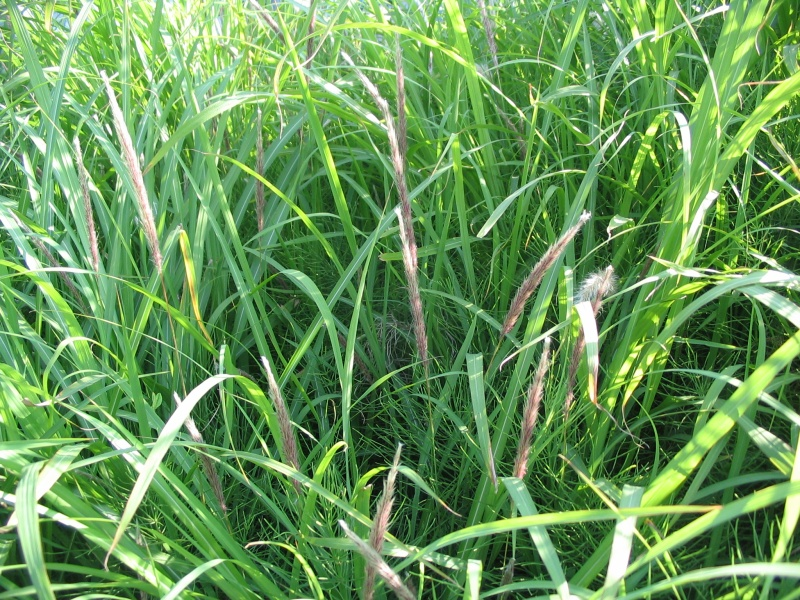
Imperata cylindrica, a preferred habitat

The red-backed fairywren is endemic to Australia and can be seen along rivers and the coast from Cape Keraudren in northern Western Australia through the Kimberleys, Arnhem Land and the Gulf Country and into Cape York, with the Selwyn Range and upper reaches of the Flinders River as a southern limit. It is also found on the nearby offshore islands Groote Eylandt, Sir Edmund Pellew, Fraser, Melville and Bathurst Islands. Its range extends all the way down the east coast east of the Great Dividing Range to the Hunter River in New South Wales, preferring wet, grassy tropical or sub-tropical areas, with tall grasses such as blady grass (Imperata cylindrica), species of Sorghum, and Eulalia. It is not a true migrant, although it may be locally nomadic due to changes in vegetation, and may leave its territory after the breeding season. The species will retreat to fire-resistant cover at times of fire.

The red-backed fairywren avoids arid habitats, and is replaced to the south of its range by the white-winged fairywren.

== Behaviour and ecology ==
The red-backed fairywren is diurnal, and becomes active at dawn, and again in bursts throughout the day. When not foraging, birds often shelter together. They roost side-by-side in dense cover and engage in mutual preening. The usual form of locomotion is hopping, with both feet leaving the ground and landing simultaneously. However, a bird may run when performing the rodent-run display. Its balance is assisted by a relatively long tail, which is usually held upright and is rarely still. The short, rounded wings provide good initial lift and are useful for short flights, though not for extended jaunts. Birds generally fly in a series of undulations for a maximum of 20 or 30 m (66 or 98 ft).

In dry tall grasslands in monsoonal areas, the change in vegetation may be so great due to either fires or wet season growth that birds may be more nomadic and change territories more often than other fairywrens. They form more stable territories elsewhere, such as in coastal areas. Cooperative breeding is less common with this species than with other fairywrens; helper birds have been sporadically reported, but the red-backed fairywren has been little studied.

Both the male and female adult red-backed fairywren may utilise the rodent-run display to distract predators from nests with young birds. The head, neck and tail are lowered, the wings are held out and the feathers are fluffed as the bird runs rapidly and voices a continuous alarm call.

=== Courtship and breeding ===
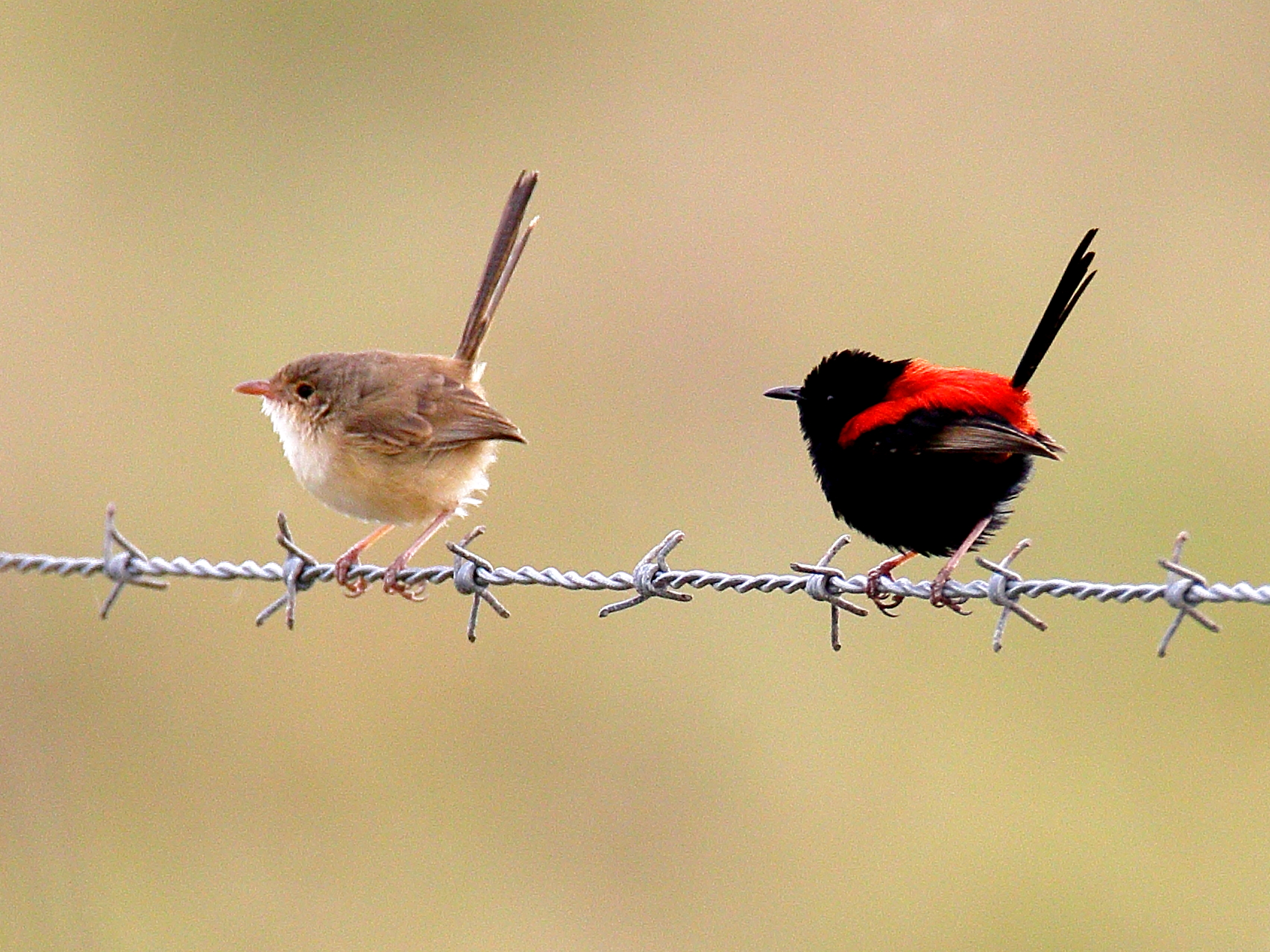
Female (left) and male in Cairns, Queensland.

During the mating season, the male moults its brown feathers and displays a fiery red plumage. It may fluff out its red back and shoulder feathers so that they cover part of the wings in a puffball-display. It will fly about and confront another male to repel it, or to assert dominance over a female. It also picks red petals and sometimes red seeds and presents them to other birds. Ninety percent of the time, this is presented to a female in what appears to be a courtship ritual. In the remaining ten percent of instances, it presents to another male as an apparent act of aggression.

Over half the red-backed fairywrens in an area can be found in pairs during the mating season. This is apparently a defence against the resource-limited nature of the environment. It is more difficult to maintain a larger interdependent group during dry spells, so the birds try to stay in pairs or smaller groups, which include adults that help parents look after young. Paternity tests have shown that an older male with bright plumage has much more success in the mating season and can mate with more than one female. Accordingly, it has higher sperm storage and makes more mating overtures towards females. A male with browner and less bright plumage or a younger male with bright plumage has a much lower success rate than a bright, older male for mating. Further, an unpaired male serves as a helper to a mated pair in feeding and care of young. After the male pairs, his bill darkens within three weeks. This is much easier to control than plumage, as moulting takes time and is controlled by seasonality. The bill is vascular and much easier to change in response to the pairings.

The mating season lasts from August to February, and coincides with the arrival of the rainy season in northern Australia. The female does the bulk of the nest building, although the male does assist; this is not typical for other birds of the genus Malurus. Concealed in grass tussocks or low shrubs, the spherical nest is constructed of dried grasses and usually lined with smaller, finer grasses and hair. Nests examined in southeast Queensland tended to be larger and untidier than those in northern Australia; the former measured 12–15 centimetres (4.7–5.9 in) high by 9–12 centimetres (3.5–4.7 in) wide and bore a partly covered entrance of 3–6 centimetres (1.2–2.4 in) in diameter, whereas the latter average around 10–13 centimetres (3.9–5.1 in) in height by 6–8 centimetres (2.4–3.1 in) wide with a 2–4 centimetres (0.79–1.57 in) entrance. Construction takes around one week, and there may be an interval of up to another seven days before eggs are laid. The eggs produced are white with reddish-brown spots in clutches of three to four, and measure 14.5–17 millimetres (0.57–0.67 in) × 10–13 millimetres (0.39–0.51 in); those of M. m. melanocephalus are a little larger than those of M. m. cruentatus. The eggs are incubated for two weeks by the female alone. The nestlings are hidden under cover for one week after hatching. The juveniles depend on parents and helpers for approximately one month. They learn to fly between 11–12 days after hatching. Broods hatched earlier in the season will help to raise the broods hatched later on. They will stay as a clutch group for the season after hatching.

=== Feeding ===
Like other fairywrens, the red-backed fairywren is predominantly insectivorous; they eat a wide variety of insects, including beetles such as weevils, leaf-, jewel-, flea- and ground-beetles, bugs, grasshoppers, moths, wasps and cicadas. Insect larvae and eggs are eaten as well as spiders. Seeds and other plant material make up only a very small proportion of its diet. It can be found hunting for insects in leaf litter, shrubbery and on the edges of bodies of water, mostly in the morning and late afternoon. Adults of both sexes as well as helper birds feed the young.

== Predators and threats ==
Adults and their young may be preyed upon by mammals such as the feral cat and red fox, reptiles such as goannas, rodents, and native predatory birds, such as the Australian magpie, butcherbird species, blue-winged kookaburra, crows and ravens, and shrike-thrushes.
