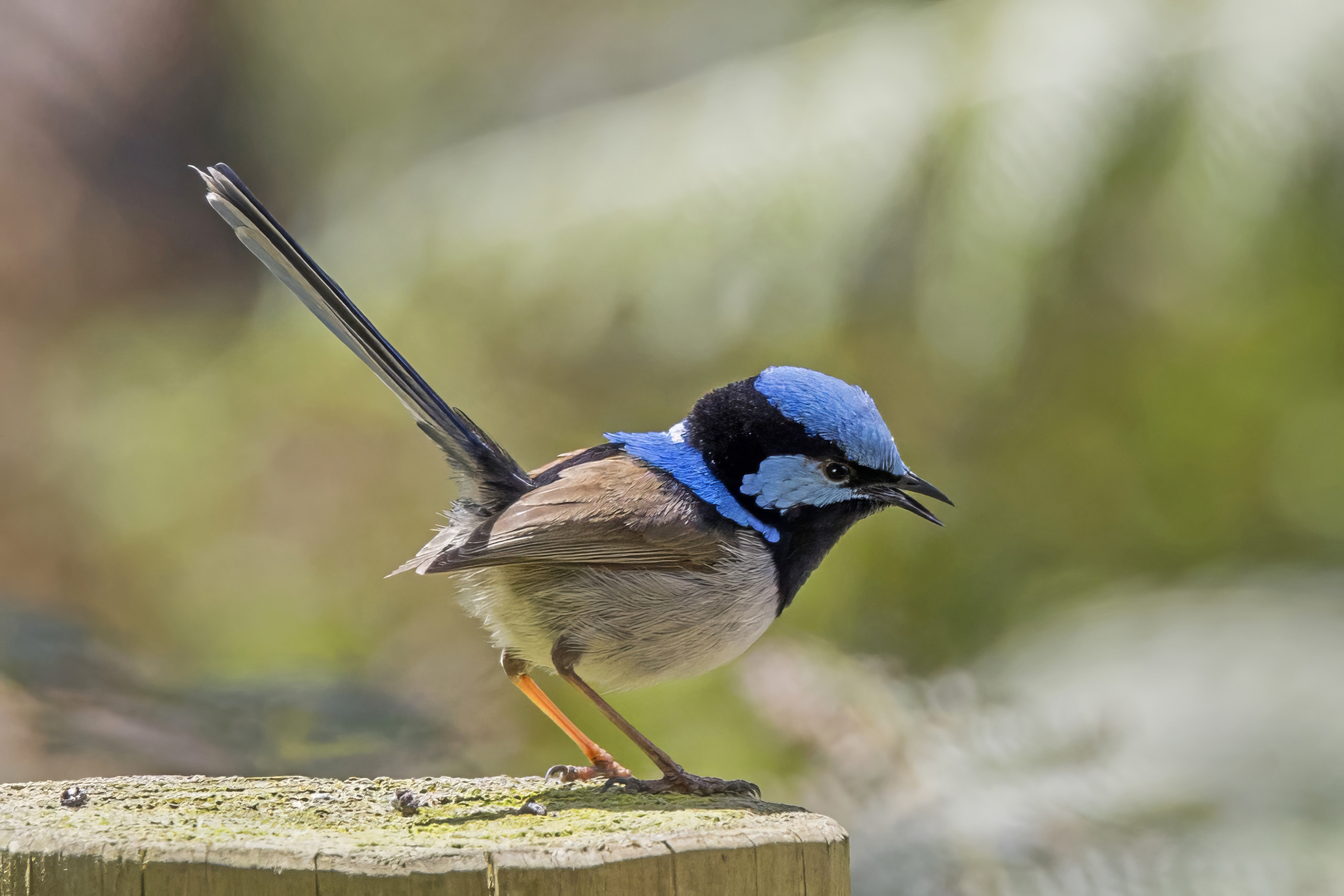
- Male superb fairywren

Scientific classification
- Kingdom: Animalia
- Phylum: Chordata
- Class: Aves
- Order: Passeriformes
- Family: Maluridae
- Genus: Malurus; Vieillot, 1816

Type species
- Motacilla cyanea Ellis, 1782

Synonyms
- Musciparus

= Malurus =

Genus of birds

Malurus is a genus of passerine birds in the Australasian wren family, Maluridae.

== Taxonomy ==
The genus Malurus was introduced in 1816 by the French ornithologist Louis Vieillot to accommodate a single species, Motacilla cyanea Latham, the superb fairywren. This is the type species. The genus name combines the Ancient Greek μαλος/malos meaning "soft" or "delicate" with ουρα/oura meaning "tail".

== Species ==
The genus contains 12 species:

Image	Scientific name	Common name	Distribution
	Malurus cyanocephalus	Emperor fairywren	New Guinea
	Malurus amabilis	Lovely fairywren	North-eastern Australia
	Malurus assimilis	Purple-backed fairywren	Central and Western Australia
	Malurus lamberti	Variegated fairywren	Eastern Australia
	Malurus pulcherrimus	Blue-breasted fairywren	Southern Western Australia and the Eyre Peninsula in South Australia
	Malurus elegans	Red-winged fairywren	South-western corner of Western Australia
	Malurus cyaneus	Superb fairywren	Australia and lowland New Guinea
	Malurus splendens	Splendid fairywren	Central and Western Australia
	Malurus coronatus	Purple-crowned fairywren	Northern Australia
	Malurus alboscapulatus	White-shouldered fairywren	New Guinea
	Malurus melanocephalus	Red-backed fairywren	Australia
	Malurus leucopterus	White-winged fairywren	Central Queensland and South Australia across to Western Australia

=== Former species ===
Some authorities, either presently or formerly, recognize several additional species as belonging to the genus Malurus including:

- Wallace's fairywren (as Malurus wallacei and Malurus wallacii)
- Broad-billed fairywren (as Malurus grayi)
- Campbell's fairywren (as Malurus campbelli)
