= Orange-crowned fairywren =

Conservation status
- Least Concern (IUCN 3.1)

Scientific classification
- Kingdom: Animalia
- Phylum: Chordata
- Class: Aves
- Order: Passeriformes
- Family: Maluridae
- Genus: Clytomyias; Sharpe, 1879
- Species: C. insignis

Binomial name
- Clytomyias insignis Sharpe, 1879

Species of bird

The orange-crowned fairywren (Clytomyias insignis) is a species of passerine bird in the Australasian wren family, Maluridae. It is monotypic within the genus Clytomyias. It is found on New Guinea in its natural habitat of subtropical or tropical moist montane forests.

== Taxonomy and systematics ==
First collected in the Arfak Mountains, the orange-crowned fairywren was described by Richard Bowdler Sharpe in 1879. Molecular study indicates that it forms a clade with the fairywrens of the genus Malurus. Alternative names for the orange-crowned fairywren include orange-crowned wren, rufous fairywren, and rufous wren-warbler.

=== Subspecies ===
Two subspecies are recognised:

- C. i. insignis - Sharpe, 1879: The nominate subspecies is found on the Bird's Head Peninsula in far north-western New Guinea
- C. i. oorti - Rothschild & Hartert, 1907: Found in the central highlands of New Guinea from western New Guinea to the Owen Stanley Range of southeastern New Guinea

== Description ==
Unlike many other species of fairywren, there is no sexual dimorphism as the male and female have the same plumage. The head is a rusty orange colour, the thighs and tail rufous, the back olive brown and the wings brown. The bill is relatively broad compared with other fairywrens and is black in colour. The eyes are dark brown, and the legs pinkish brown. The two subspecies are distinguishable by their underparts, which are cream-white in C. i. insignis and more ochre-coloured in C.i. oorti.

== Distribution and habitat ==
The orange-crowned fairywren is found in thick undergrowth of montane rainforest at an altitude of 2,000–3,000 m (6,600–9,800 ft).

== Behaviour and ecology ==
The orange-crowned fairywren is generally encountered in pairs or small groups of six to eight birds. Very little is known about its courtship behaviour or breeding.
