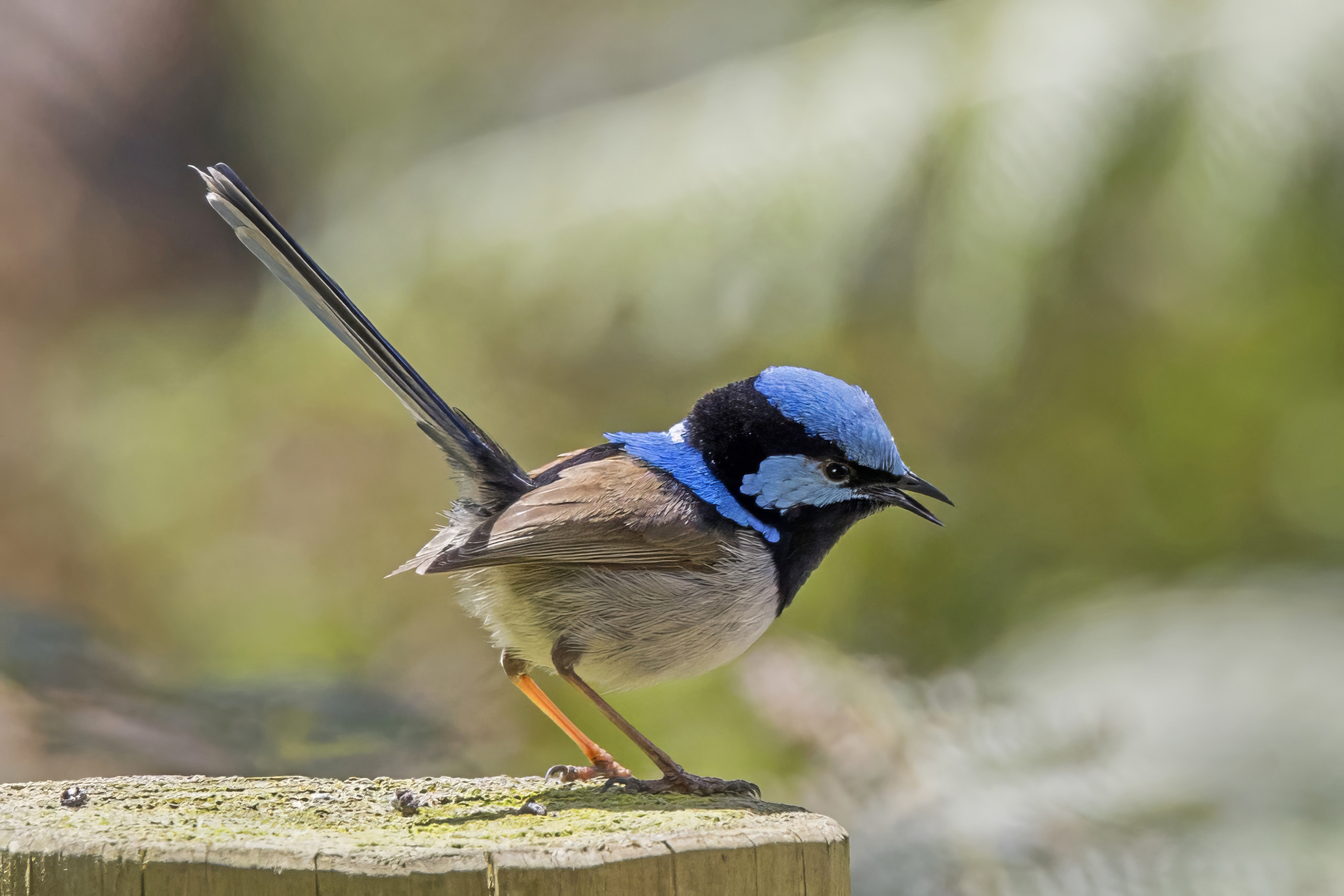
- Male superb fairywren

Scientific classification
- Kingdom: Animalia
- Phylum: Chordata
- Class: Aves
- Order: Passeriformes
- Superfamily: Meliphagoidea
- Family: Maluridae; Swainson, 1831

Type genus
- Malurus

Genera
- See text

= Australasian wren =

Family of birds

The Australasian wrens are a family, Maluridae, of small, insectivorous passerine birds endemic to Australia and New Guinea. While commonly known as wrens, they are not closely related to the true wrens. The family comprises 33 species (including sixteen fairywrens, three emu-wrens, and thirteen grasswrens) in six genera.

== Taxonomy and systematics ==
As with many other Australian creatures, and perhaps more than most, the species making up this family were comprehensively misunderstood by early researchers. They were variously classified as Old World flycatchers, Old World warblers, and Old World babblers. In the late 1960s, morphological studies began to suggest that the Australo-Papuan fairywrens, the grasswrens, emu-wrens and two monotypic wren-like genera from New Guinea were related and, following Charles Sibley's pioneering work on egg-white proteins in the mid-1970s, Australian researchers adopted the family name Maluridae in 1975.

With further morphological work and the great strides made in DNA analysis towards the end of the 20th century, their position became clear: the Maluridae are one of the many families to have emerged from the great corvid radiation in Australasia. Their closest relatives are the honeyeaters (Meliphagidae), and the pardalotes (Pardalotidae). Their obvious similarity to the wrens of Europe and America is not genetic, but simply the consequence of convergent evolution between more-or-less unrelated species that share the same ecological niche.

A 2011 analysis of mitochondrial and nuclear DNA found the broad-billed fairywren and Campbell's fairywren, both formerly lumped together in the genus Malurus, to lie in a clade with the two other monospecific New Guinea genera and as such, they were later re-classified as separate species within the genus Chenorhamphus.

Currently, there are 33 species in 6 genera:

Family Maluridae

- Subfamily Malurinae
  - Tribe Malurini – fairywrens
    - Genus Sipodotus – Wallace's fairywren
    - Genus Chenorhamphus – (2 species)
    - Genus Malurus – (12 species)
    - Genus Clytomyias – Orange-crowned fairywren
  - Tribe Stipiturini
    - Genus Stipiturus – emu-wrens (3 species)
- Subfamily Amytornithinae
  - Genus Amytornis – grasswrens (14 species)

== Description ==
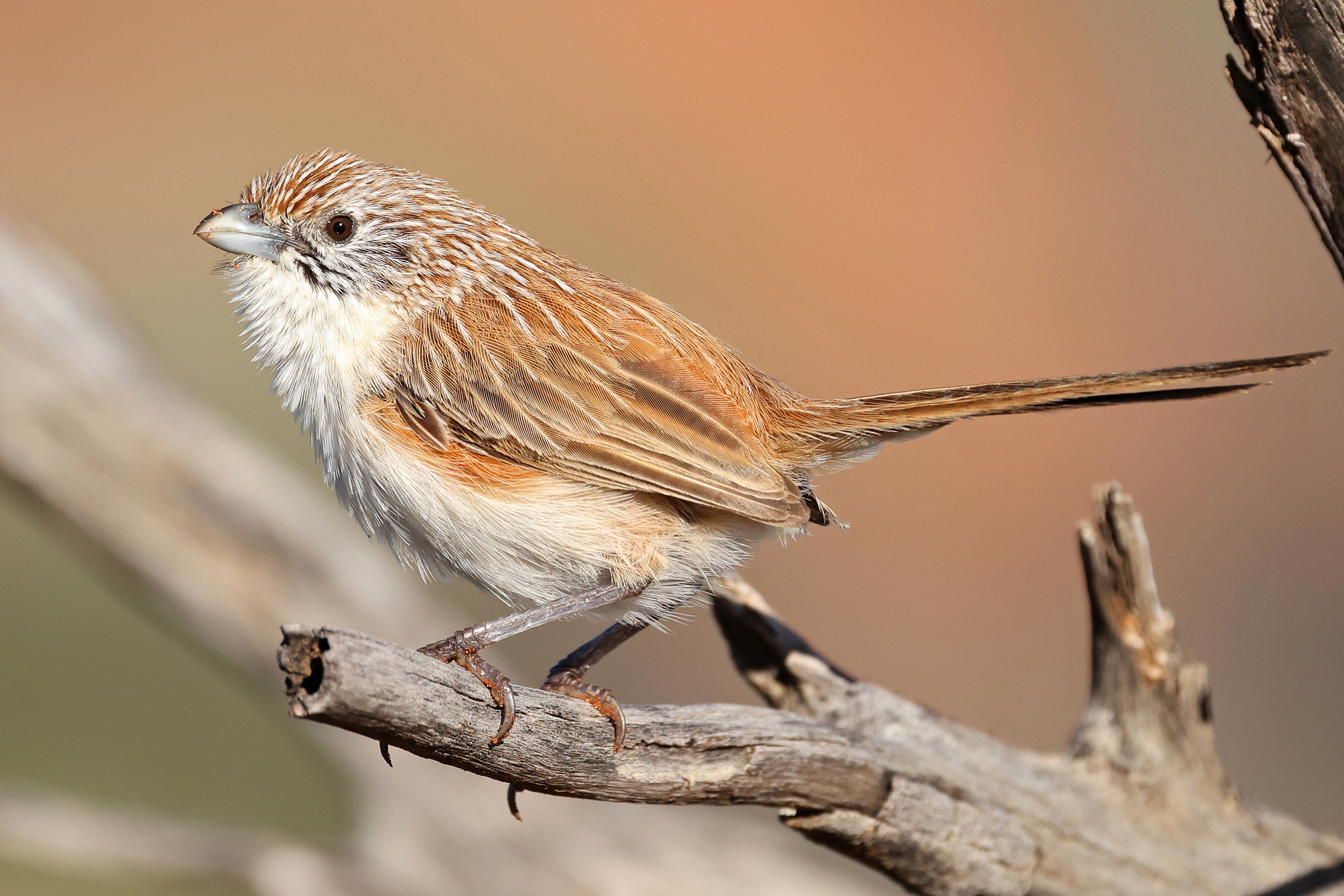
The plumage of the Eyrean grasswren is typical of the genus

Malurids are small to medium birds, inhabiting a wide range of environments from rainforest to desert, although most species inhabit grassland or scrub. The grasswrens are well camouflaged with black and brown patterns, but other species often have brilliantly coloured plumage, especially in the males.

They are insectivorous, typically foraging in underbrush. They build domed nests in areas of dense vegetation, and it is not unusual for the young to remain in the nest and assist in raising chicks from later clutches.

Fairywrens are notable for several peculiar behavioral characteristics. They are socially monogamous and sexually promiscuous, meaning that although they form pairs between one male and one female, each partner will mate with other individuals and even assist in raising the young from such pairings. Males of several species pluck petals of conspicuous colours and display them to females for reasons unknown.

The song of fairywrens is pleasant and complex, and at least two species (the superb and splendid fairywren) possess, in addition to the alarm calls common to – and universally understood by – most small birds, another vocalization used when confronted by predators. This, termed "Type II Vocalization," is song-like and used when confronted by calling butcherbirds, and sometimes other predatory birds. Its purpose is, however, unknown; it does not seem to be a warning call.
