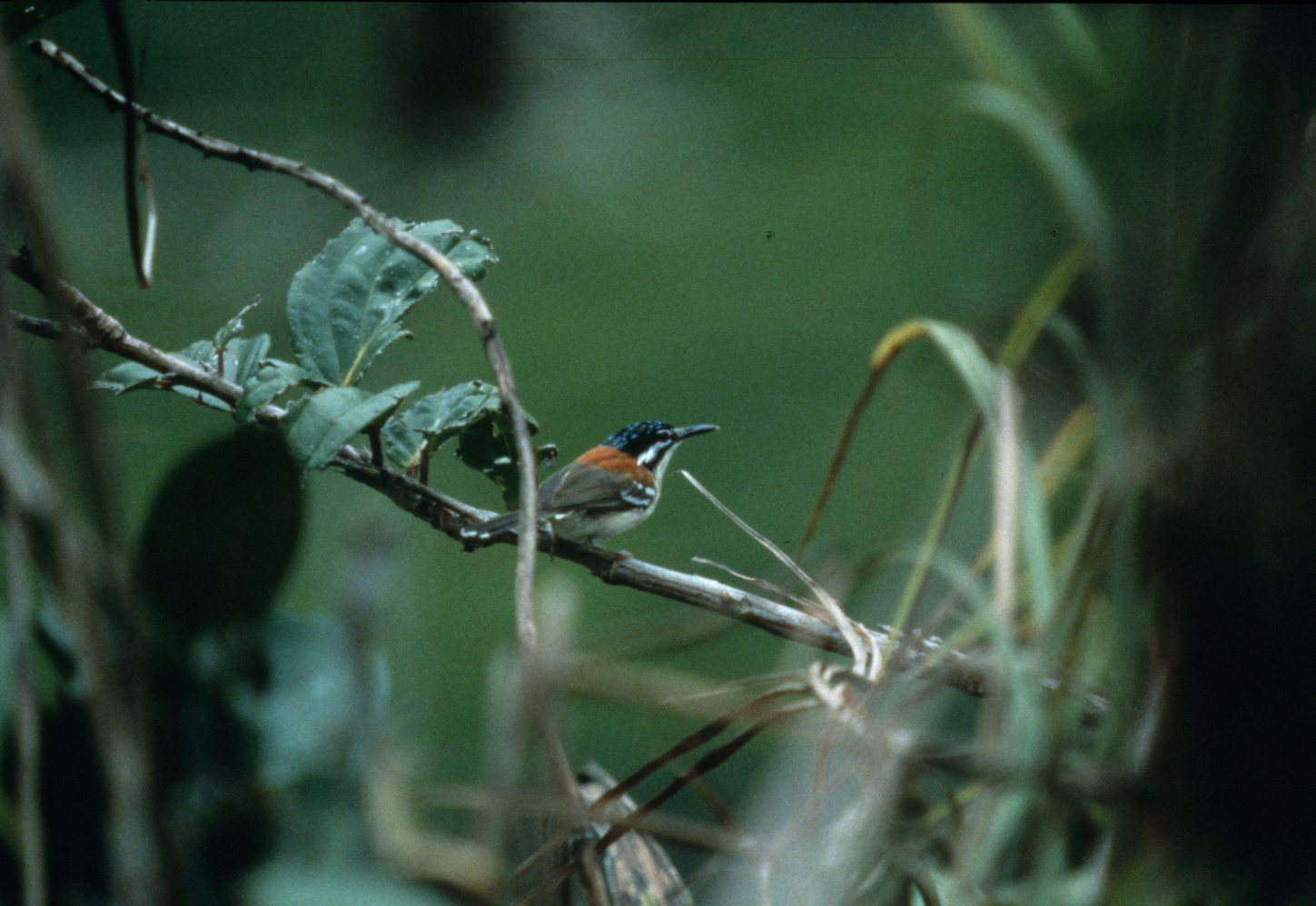

Conservation status
- Least Concern (IUCN 3.1)

Scientific classification
- Kingdom: Animalia
- Phylum: Chordata
- Class: Aves
- Order: Passeriformes
- Family: Maluridae
- Genus: Sipodotus; Mathews, 1928
- Species: S. wallacii

Binomial name
- Sipodotus wallacii (Gray, G.R., 1862)

Synonyms
- Todopsis wallacii Gray, G.R., 1862; Todopsis coronatus Gould, 1878; Tchitrea wallaceii; Malurus wallacei; Malurus wallacii

= Wallace's fairywren =

Species of bird

Wallace's fairywren (Sipodotus wallacii) is a species of bird in the Australasian wren family, Maluridae. It is the only species within the genus Sipodotus. It is found in New Guinea and the Aru Islands, where its natural habitat is subtropical or tropical moist lowland forests.

== Taxonomy and systematics ==
The Wallace's fairywren is the only member of the monotypic genus Sipodotus.

Wallace's fairywren was originally described in the genus Todopsis as Todopsis wallacii by G.R. Gray in 1862 on the basis of specimens collected by Charles Allen on Misool Island. Specimens from the Aru Islands were described as Todopsis coronata by John Gould in 1878. Mathews established the monotypic genus Sipodotus for the Wallace's fairywren in 1928 on the basis of the shape of the bill and the nearly identical plumages of the male and female of the species. The species has also been placed in the genus Malurus. When the species is placed in the genus Malurus, the subspecific name coronatus is preoccupied and is replaced with capillatus, coined by Mayr in 1986.

The species' specific epithet is named after Alfred Russel Wallace, a British naturalist, explorer, geographer, and biologist. the generic name Sipodotus is an anagram of Todopsis. Alternate names for Wallace's fairywren include the blue-capped fairywren, Wallace's wren, and Wallace's wren-warbler.

Like other Australasian wrens, Wallace's fairywren is not related to the true wrens. The fairywrens were initially thought to be related to Muscicapidae (old-world flycatchers) or Sylviidae (warblers), before being placed in the Maluridae in 1975. Recently, DNA analysis has shown the Maluridae to be a part of the superfamily Meliphagoidea with the Pardalotidae (pardalotes) and the Meliphagidae (honeyeaters).

=== Subspecies ===
There are two recognized subspecies:

- S. w. wallacii - Gray, G.R., 1862: The nominate subspecies, it occurs on Misool and Yapen Island, the Bird's Head Peninsula, and on the north coast of New Guinea, east from Geelvink Bay.
- S. w. coronatus - Gould, 1878: Occurs on the Aru Islands, in southern New Guinea from the Setekwa River to Milne Bay, and north to the Hydrographers Range. When the species is placed in Malurus, the subspecies is known as M. w. capillatus. Females have less buff on the throat and breast than in the nominate subspecies.

== Description ==
Wallace's fairywren is a small species of fairywren, 11–12.5 cm (4.3–4.9 in) in length and weighing 7–8 g (0.25–0.28 oz). Adult males have a black crown and nape with blue feather tips and a black face with an incomplete white eye-ring and white ear-tufts. The scapulars and back are rusty brown, with brownish-grey upperwings, white underparts, and brown tails. The black beak is long, broad, straight, and bluntly pointed, with a white tip. The iris is red-brown, with short, flesh-brown legs. Females are similar to males, but have a pale yellowish wash to the throat and a duller crown. Subspecies coronatus has a creamy wash to the underparts. Immatures are duller than the adults, with shorter bills and ear-coverts, along with having the crown be speckled buff instead of blue.

Little is known about its vocalisations, but hissing see see see see calls are given by foraging parties.

== Distribution and habitat ==
Wallace's fairywren is endemic to New Guinea. It is common throughout New Guinea, except on the Huon Peninsula, eastern Sepik-Ramu, and most of the northern parts of the southeastern peninsula. The species inhabits foothill rainforest and secondary growth between elevations of 100–800 m (330–2,620 ft), although they can be found up to elevations of 1,200 m (3,940 ft) and in lowland plains where there is suitable vegetation.

It is typically found more in trees than in the undergrowth, most commonly from 2–10 m (6.6–32.8 ft) above the ground, but can be found from ground level to 40 m (130 ft) in the canopy. They most commonly inhabit trees with tangles of vines and climbing bamboo at forest edges.

== Behaviour and ecology ==
=== Breeding ===
Breeding occurs throughout the year, with a peak in September-December. Out of three observed nests, two were attended by three adults each. Nests are domed structures, with a hooded side entrance near the top, and are made out of fine grass, cobwebs, and strips of palm frond, lined with finer fibres and sometimes covered with bits of moss and epiphytes. Nests are placed in vines at a height of 5–10 m (20–30 ft) above the ground, although one nest was built in a 1–5 m (0–20 ft) tall shrub at the top of a 30 m (100 ft) tall cliff face. Eggs are thought to be laid in clutches of two. Chicks are fed by both parents once they hatch.

=== Diet ===
Wallace's fairywrens are thought to be mainly insectivorous, feeding on insects and spiders. They forage by gleaning and probing in forest tangles and thickets. It has been known to forage with mixed species flocks, typically in family groups of 4-8 individuals.

== Status ==
Wallace's fairywren is listed as least concern by the IUCN due to its large range and lack of significant population declines. They are common throughout foothill rainforest in their range. However, large-scale clearing of rainforest may be a potential threat.
