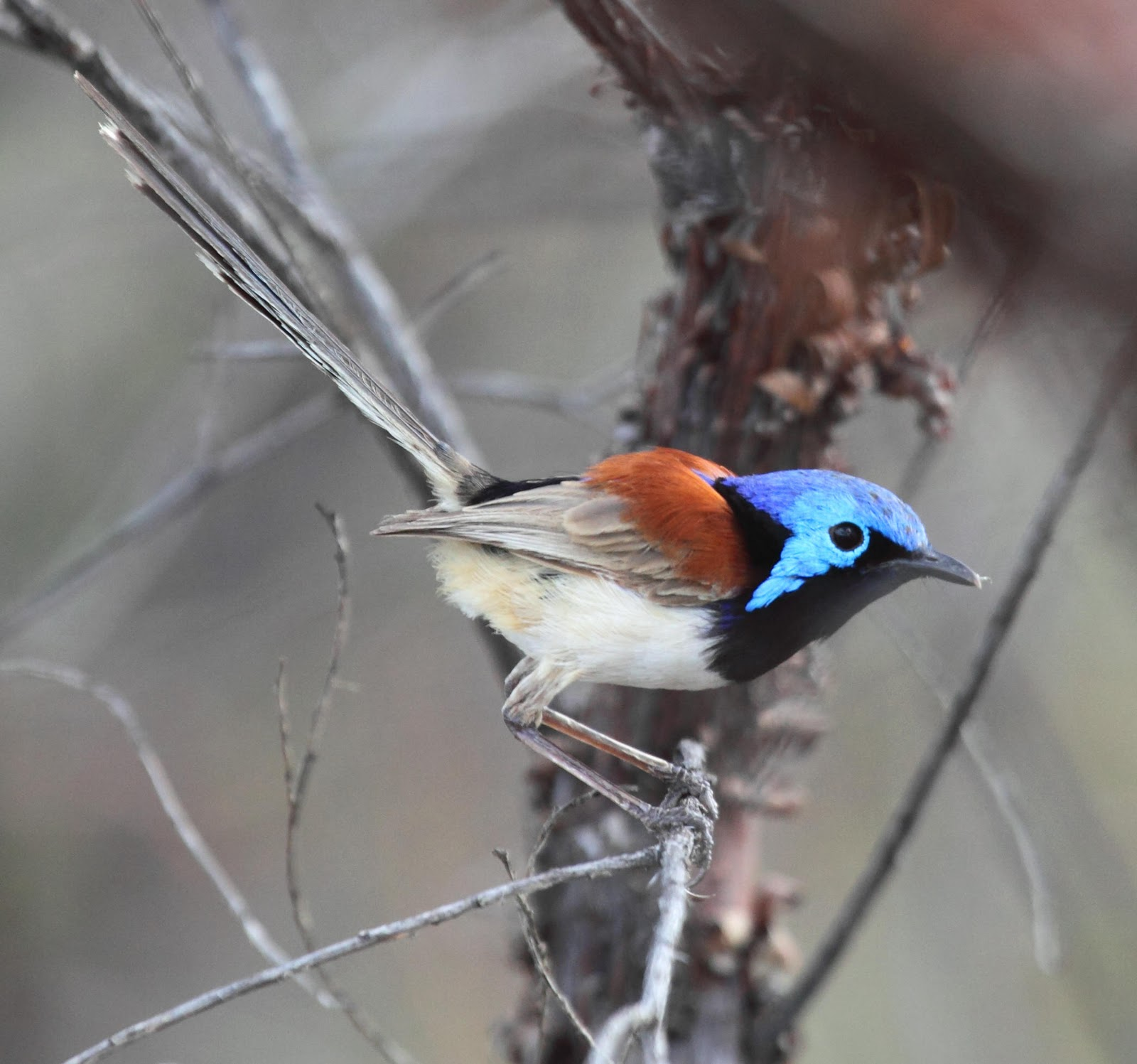

Conservation status
- Least Concern (IUCN 3.1)

Scientific classification
- Kingdom: Animalia
- Phylum: Chordata
- Class: Aves
- Order: Passeriformes
- Family: Maluridae
- Genus: Malurus
- Species: M. assimilis

Binomial name
- Malurus assimilis North, 1901

= Purple-backed fairywren =

Species of bird

The purple-backed fairywren (Malurus assimilis) is a fairywren that is native to Australia. Described by Alfred John North in 1901, it has four recognised subspecies. In a species that exhibits sexual dimorphism, the brightly coloured breeding male has chestnut shoulders and azure crown and ear coverts, while non-breeding males, females and juveniles have predominantly grey-brown plumage, although females of two subspecies have mainly blue-grey plumage. Distributed over much of the Australian continent, the purple-backed fairywren is found in scrubland with plenty of vegetation providing dense cover.

== Taxonomy and systematics ==
Australian ornithologist Alfred John North described the purple-backed fairywren in 1901, proposing it be called the purple-backed superb warbler. He added that Edward Pierson Ramsay had noted that inland specimens differed from coastal specimens of the variegated fairywren around 25 years previously. However, Australian amateur ornithologist Gregory Mathews considered it a subspecies of the variegated fairywren.

Mathews went on to name subspecies mastersi from the Northern Territory on the basis of a paler blue colouring of the adult male's ear coverts, subspecies occidentalis from Western Australia on the basis of a blue rather than purplish crown, and subspecies mungi from northwestern Australia on the basis of the male's darker ear coverts and female's buff coloration. None are recognised as distinct.

He also described subspecies dulcis and subspecies rogersi as subspecies of the lovely fairywren.

It was long considered a subspecies of the variegated fairywren until its genetic distinctness led to it once again becoming a separate species in 2018.

Within the genus it belongs to a group of five very similar species known collectively as chestnut-shouldered fairywrens. The other four species are the lovely fairywren, variegated fairywren, red-winged fairywren, and the blue-breasted fairywren. Mathews erected the genus Leggeornis for the group, now reclassified as a subgenus within Malurus.

A 2011 analysis of mitochondrial and nuclear DNA found that the purple-backed fairywren was nested within the variegated fairywren complex, and is the sister taxon of the lovely fairywren.

Like other fairywrens, the purple-backed fairywren is unrelated to the true wrens. Initially, fairywrens were thought to be a member of the Old World flycatcher family, Muscicapidae, or the warbler family, Sylviidae, before being placed in the newly recognised Maluridae in 1975. More recently, DNA analysis has shown the family to be related to the honeyeaters (Meliphagidae) and the pardalotes (Pardalotidae) in a large superfamily Meliphagoidea.

"Purple-backed fairywren" has been designated the official name by the International Ornithologists' Union (IOC).

=== Subspecies ===
Four subspecies are currently recognised. There are zones with intermediate forms between the ranges of each subspecies.

- M. a. assimilis - North, 1901: Occurs across central Australia, from Queensland and western New South Wales to coastal Western Australia. There is a broad area where intermediate forms between this and the variegated fairywren live that is bordered by Goondiwindi, Wide Bay, Rockhampton and Emerald in southern Queensland.
- Lavender-flanked fairywren (M. a. dulcis) - Mathews, 1908: Originally described as a separate species though this and M. a. rogersi were long considered forms of the lovely fairywren until intergrades were noted over a wide area of northern Australia with subspecies assimilis. Alternatively named the lavender-flanked wren. Like subspecies rogersi, females are predominantly blue-grey rather than grey-brown and have white lores and eye rings rather than the rufous coloration of the other subspecies. It also has a longer bill and wing than subspecies assimilis. It is found in Arnhem Land in north-central Australia.
- Rogers's fairywren (M. a. rogersi) - Mathews, 1912: Formerly considered as a separate species and also as the same taxon as the lavender-flanked fairywren. Though the males are similar to the widely occurring inland subspecies assimilis, the females are predominantly blue-grey rather than grey-brown. It also has a longer bill and shorter tail than subspecies assimilis. It is found in the Kimberleys in north-western Australia. A broad hybrid zone with females of both subspecies has been recorded from northeastern Western Australia and the northwestern Northern Territory.
- M. a. bernieri - Ogilvie-Grant, 1909: Found on Bernier Island and Dorre Island off the coast of Western Australia. Populations from the latter island intergrade with the neighbouring subspecies assimilis. The male breeding plumage is much darker than that of subspecies assimilis from Western Australia, more closely resembling that of eastern Australian populations. The ear coverts are dark blue and the tail more bluish than those of assimilis, which it otherwise resembles. Females and immatures are poorly known but thought to resemble those of subspecies assimilis.

=== Evolutionary history ===
In his 1982 monograph, ornithologist Richard Schodde proposed a northern origin for the chestnut-shouldered fairywren group due to the variety of forms in north and their absence in the southeast of the continent. Ancestral birds spread south and colonised the southwest during a warm wetter period around 2 million years ago at the end of the Pliocene or beginning of the Pleistocene. Subsequent cooler and drier conditions resulted in loss of habitat and fragmentation of populations. South-western birds gave rise to what is now the red-winged fairywren, while those in the northwest of the continent became the variegated fairywren and yet another isolated in the northeast became the lovely fairywren. Further warmer, humid conditions again allowed birds to spread southwards, this group occupying central southern Australia east to the Eyre Peninsula became the blue-breasted fairywren. Cooler climate after this resulted in this being isolated as well and evolving into a separate species. Finally, after the end of the last glacial period 12,000–13,000 years ago, the northern variegated forms have again spread southwards, resulting in the purple-backed fairywren. This has resulted in the variegated fairywren's range to overlap with all four other species. Schodde also proposed that the blue-grey coloured females of the lavender-flanked subspecies were ancestral, while the browner coloration of females of southern forms was an adaptation to dry climates. Further molecular studies may result in this hypothesis being modified.

A 2017 molecular analysis by Alison J. McLean and colleagues of the various subspecies across Australia largely supported Schodde's hypothesis. The Great Dividing Range was a major barrier and there is a deep genetic split between subspecies lamberti to its east, and subspecies assimilis and the others to the west. McLean proposed resurrecting the separate species status of the purple-backed fairywren as M. assimilis and the other subspecies to the north and west as reallocated to this species. A genetic split was also found across the Eyrean barrier, suggesting splitting those east and west (as M. assimilis mastersi Mathews) into separate subspecies would reflect the divergence.

== Description ==
The purple-backed fairywren is on average 14.5 cm (5.5 in) long. Like other fairywrens, it is notable for its marked sexual dimorphism, males adopting a highly visible breeding plumage of brilliant iridescent blue and chestnut contrasting with black and grey-brown. The brightly coloured crown and ear tufts are prominently featured in breeding displays. The male in breeding plumage has striking bright blue ear coverts and blue-purple crown and forehead, a black throat and nape, a blue-purple upper back, chestnut shoulders and a bluish-grey tail. The wings are drab brown and the belly white. Within subspecies assimilis, the plumage of both sexes is becomes paler from east to west across its range, with those of northwestern Australia paler still. Non-breeding males, females and juveniles of subspecies assimilis are predominantly grey-brown in colour, while those of subspecies rogersi and dulcis are mainly blue-grey. Males of all subspecies have a black bill and lores (eye-ring and bare skin between eyes and bill), while females of subspecies assimilis and rogersi have a red-brown bill and bright rufous lores, and those of subspecies dulcis have white lores. Immature males will develop black bills by six months of age, and moult into breeding plumage the first breeding season after hatching, though this may be incomplete with residual brownish plumage and may take another year or two to perfect. Both sexes moult in autumn after breeding, with males assuming an eclipse non-breeding plumage. They will moult again into nuptial plumage in winter or spring. The blue coloured plumage, particularly the ear-coverts, of the breeding males is highly iridescent due to the flattened and twisted surface of the barbules. The blue plumage also reflects ultraviolet light strongly, and so may be even more prominent to other fairywrens, whose colour vision extends into that part of the spectrum.

== Distribution and habitat ==
The purple-backed fairywren is widely distributed over much of the Australian continent. It is replaced in southwestern Western Australia by the red-winged and blue-breasted fairywrens, and by the lovely fairywren north of a line between Normanton and Townsville in north Queensland. Some early evidence suggested subspecies assimilis may be nomadic, but later more detailed fieldwork indicated it was generally sedentary, with pairs of purple-backed fairywrens maintaining territories year-round. There is little information on the other subspecies.

It is found in scrubland with plenty of vegetation providing dense cover. It prefers rocky outcrops and patches of Acacia, Eremophila or lignum in inland and northern Australia. Fieldwork in the Northern Territory showed that the species preferred open woodland dominated by thickets of lancewood (Acacia shirleyi) and bullwaddy (Macropteranthes kekwickii) than eucalyptus. Chenopod scrubland with plants such as saltbush, bluebush, black rolypoly (Sclerolaena muricata), nitre goosefoot (Chenopodium nitrariaceum), grass tussocks, and overstory plants such as black box (Eucalyptus largiflorens) and native cypress (Callitris).

Clearing of native vegetation for agriculture in the Western Australian wheatbelt and Murray-Mallee region of Victoria had a negative impact on the species, as does the consumption of saltbush by cattle.

== Behaviour ==
=== Breeding ===
Breeding can occur at any time in inland Australia, with birds taking the opportunity to nest after heavy rains, although only one brood is usually raised each year.

The nest is a round or domed structure made of loosely woven grasses, twigs, bark and spider webs, with an entrance in one side, and is often larger than those of other fairywrens. Nest measured at Shark Bay ranged from 9 to 11 cm tall and 5 to 9 cm wide.
