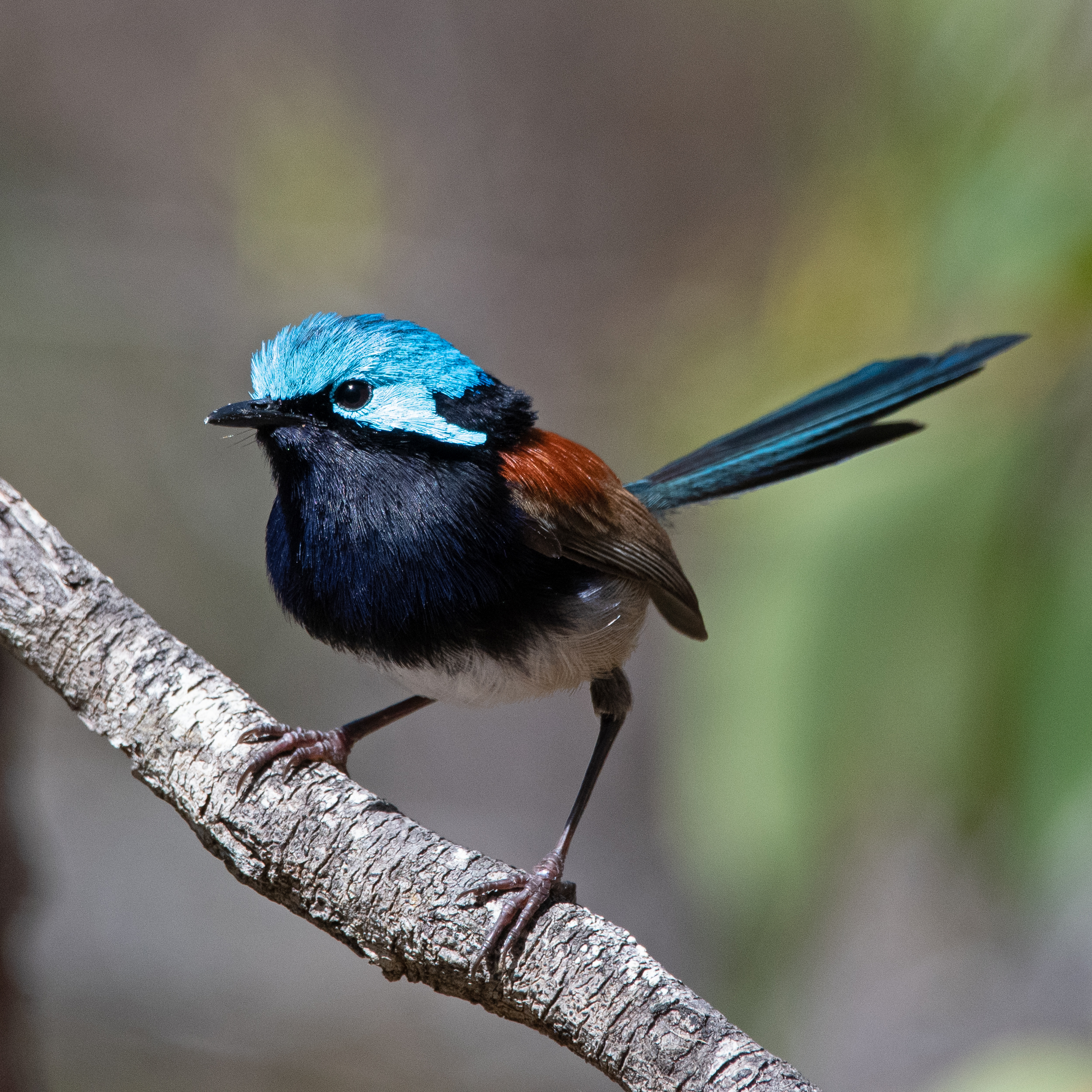
- Male at Mount Hallowell, Denmark, Western Australia.

Conservation status
- Least Concern (IUCN 3.1)

Scientific classification
- Kingdom: Animalia
- Phylum: Chordata
- Class: Aves
- Order: Passeriformes
- Family: Maluridae
- Genus: Malurus
- Species: M. elegans

Binomial name
- Malurus elegans Gould, 1837
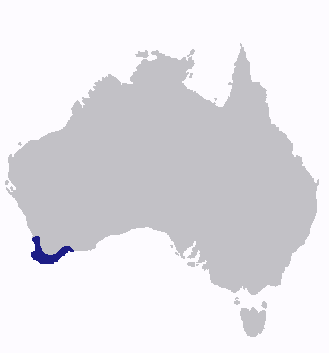
- Approximate range/distribution map of the red-winged fairywren. Blue indicates presence.

= Red-winged fairywren =

Passerine bird in the Australasian wren family

The red-winged fairywren (Malurus elegans) is a species of passerine bird in the Australasian wren family, Maluridae. It is non-migratory and endemic to the southwestern corner of Western Australia. Exhibiting a high degree of sexual dimorphism, the male adopts a brilliantly coloured breeding plumage, with an iridescent silvery-blue crown, ear coverts and upper back, red shoulders, contrasting with a black throat, grey-brown tail and wings and pale underparts. Non-breeding males, females and juveniles have predominantly grey-brown plumage, though males may bear isolated blue and black feathers. No separate subspecies are recognised. Similar in appearance and closely related to the variegated fairywren and the blue-breasted fairywren, it is regarded as a separate species as no intermediate forms have been recorded where their ranges overlap. Though the red-winged fairywren is locally common, there is evidence of a decline in numbers.

Bearing a narrow pointed bill adapted for probing and catching insects, the red-winged fairywren is primarily insectivorous; it forages and lives in the shelter of scrubby vegetation in temperate wetter forests dominated by karri trees, remaining close to cover to avoid predators. Like other fairywrens, it is a cooperative breeding species, with small groups of birds maintaining and defending small territories year-round. Groups consist of a socially monogamous pair with several helper birds who assist in raising the young. There is a higher proportion of female helpers recorded for this species than for other species of fairywren. A variety of vocalisations and visual displays have been recorded for communication and courtship in this species. Singing is used to advertise territory, and birds can distinguish other individuals by song alone. Male wrens pluck yellow petals and display them to females as part of a courtship display.

== Taxonomy and systematics ==
The red-winged fairywren was described by ornithologist John Gould in 1837, who gave it the bird's specific name which is derived from the Latin term elegans 'elegant'. He noted its location as the eastern coast of Australia, but corrected his error after further collections by John Gilbert from south-western Australia. Amateur ornithologist Gregory Mathews described birds from the southern karri forests as subspecies warreni in 1916 on the basis of darker female plumage. However, others have not observed this subsequently and the current consensus is that no separate subspecies are recognized. In fact there is little variation in size or colour within the species between populations or individuals.

It is one of eleven species of the genus Malurus, commonly known as fairywrens, found in Australia and lowland New Guinea. Within the genus it belongs to a group of four very similar species known collectively as chestnut-shouldered fairywrens. The other three species are the lovely fairywren, the variegated fairywren, and the blue-breasted fairywren. Molecular study showed the blue-breasted fairywren to be the most closely related to the red-winged fairywren.

Like other fairywrens, the red-winged fairywren is unrelated to the true wrens. Initially, fairywrens were thought to be a member of the Old World flycatcher family, or the warbler family, Sylviidae, before being placed in the newly recognised Australasian wren family, Maluridae, in 1975. More recently, DNA analysis has shown the family to be related to the honeyeaters (Meliphagidae) and the pardalotes (Pardalotidae) in a large superfamily, Meliphagoidea.

Alternative names for the red-winged fairywren include red-winged blue-wren and red-winged wren.

=== Evolutionary history ===
In his 1982 monograph, ornithologist Richard Schodde proposed a northern origin for the chestnut-shouldered fairywren group due to the variety of forms in the north and their absence in the southeast of the continent. Ancestral birds spread south and colonised the southwest during a warm and wetter period around 2 million years ago at the end of the Pliocene or beginning of the Pleistocene. Subsequent cooler and drier conditions resulted in the loss of habitat and fragmentation of populations. South-western birds gave rise to what is now the red-winged fairywren, while those in the northwest of the continent became the variegated fairywren. Further warmer, humid conditions again allowed birds to spread southwards; this group, occupying central southern Australia east to the Eyre Peninsula, became the blue-breasted fairywren. Cooler climate then resulted in this being isolated as well and evolving into a separate species. Finally, after the end of the last glacial period 12,000–13,000 years ago, the northern variegated forms again spread southwards. This has resulted in the ranges of all three species overlapping.

== Description ==
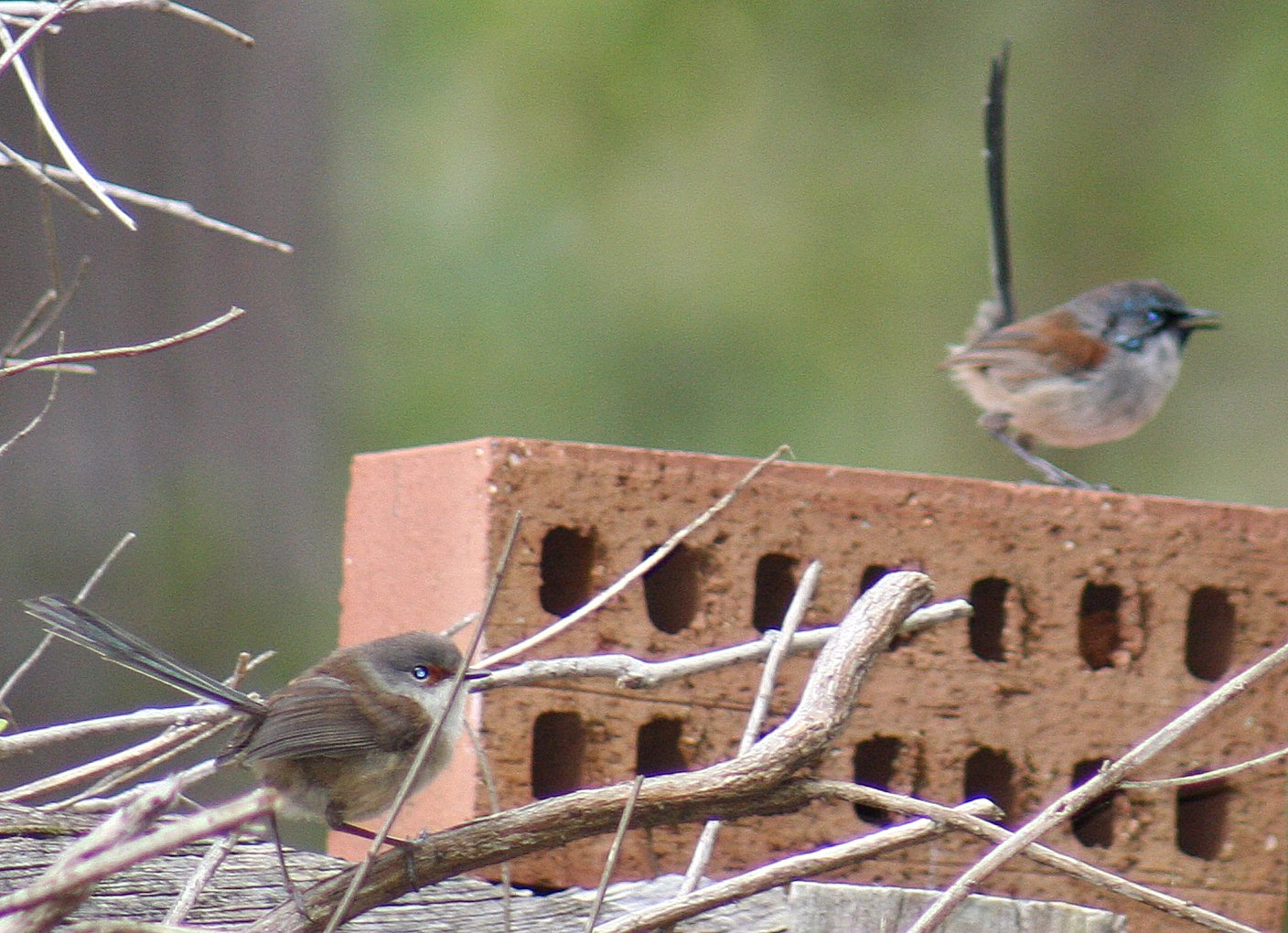
Female (left), black bill and red lores, male in eclipse plumage showing patches of black and blue

The red-winged fairywren is 15 cm (6 in) long and weighs 8–11 g (0.28–0.39 oz), making it the largest of the fairywrens. The average tail length is 7.5 cm (3.0 in), among the longest in the genus. Averaging 10 mm (0.4 in) in males and 9.3 mm (0.4 in) in females, the bill is relatively long, narrow and pointed, and wider at the base. Wider than it is deep, the bill is similar in shape to those of other birds that feed by probing for or by picking insects off of their environs.

Like other fairywrens, the red-winged fairywren is notable for its marked sexual dimorphism, males adopting a highly visible breeding plumage of brilliant iridescent blue and chestnut contrasting with black and grey-brown. The brightly coloured crown, ear tufts and upper back are prominently featured in breeding displays. The male in breeding plumage has a silvery blue crown, ear coverts and upper back, a black throat and nape, bright red-brown shoulders, a long grey-brown tail and wings, and a greyish-white belly. Non-breeding males, females and juveniles are predominantly grey-brown in colour, though males may retain traces of blue and black plumage. All males have a black bill and lores (eye-ring and bare skin between eyes and bill), while females have a black bill, rufous lores and pale grey eye-ring. Immature males will develop black lores by six weeks of age and generally moult into an incomplete breeding plumage the first breeding season after hatching.

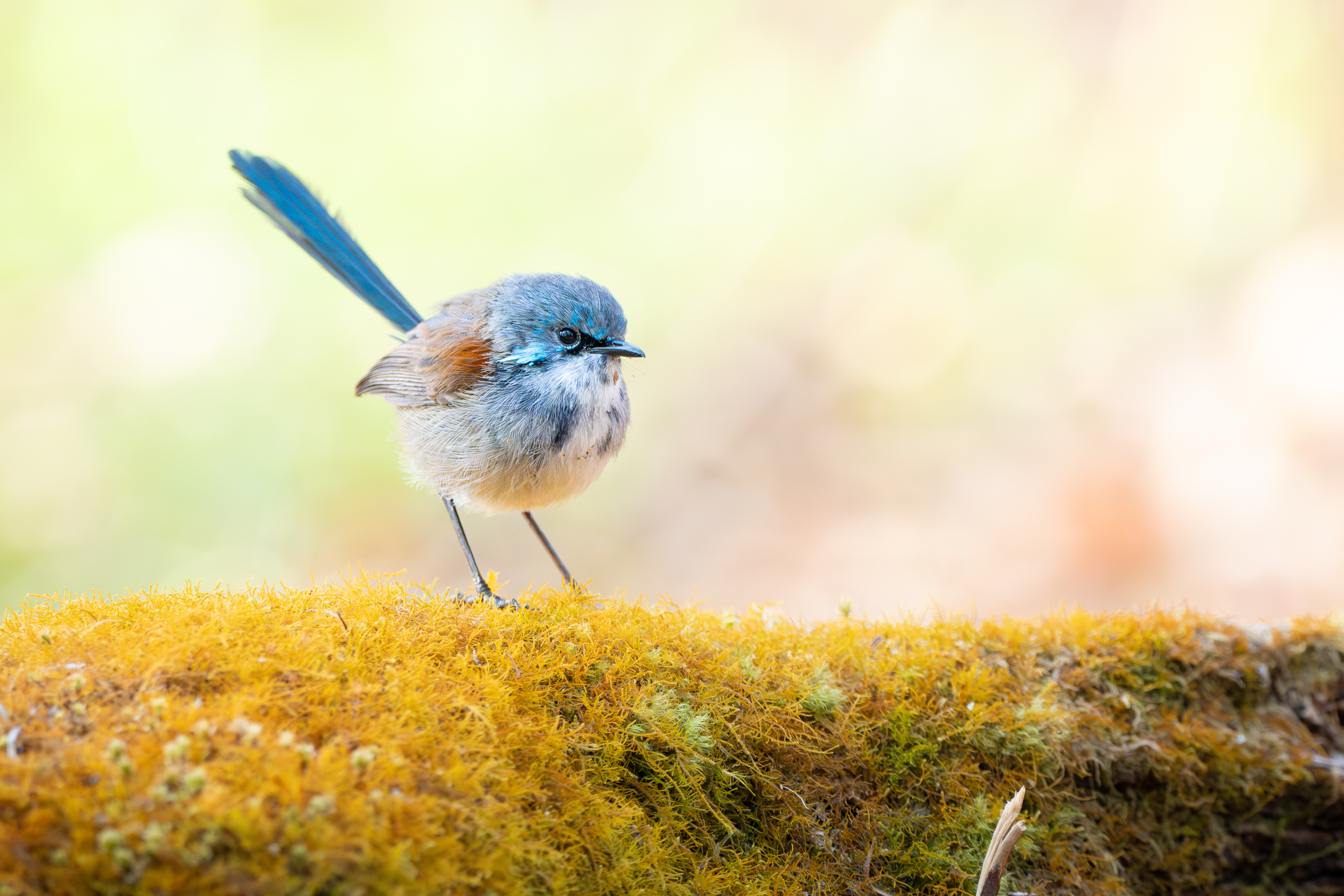
Non-breeding Male in eclipse plumage

This has a patchy or spotty appearance, with a mixture of blue and grey feathers on the head, and black and grey on the breast; birds born early in the breeding season will gain more nuptial plumage initially than those born late. Most perfect their nuptial moult by their second spring, though some may need another year. Several males have been observed in breeding plumage in a single group at the same time, although it is unknown if or how this is related to dominance or breeding status.

Both sexes moult in autumn after breeding, with males assuming an eclipse non-breeding plumage. They will moult again into nuptial plumage in winter or spring. Body feathers are replaced at both moults while wing and tail feathers are in spring only, though the latter may be replaced at any time if damaged or worn. The blue coloured plumage, particularly the ear-coverts, of the breeding males is highly iridescent due to the flattened and twisted surface of the barbules. The blue plumage also reflects ultraviolet light strongly, and so may be even more prominent to other fairywrens, whose colour vision extends into this part of the spectrum.

=== Vocalisations ===
Vocal communication among red-winged fairywrens is used primarily for communication between birds in a social group and for advertising and defending a territory. They are able to distinguish different individuals on the basis of song alone, which is integral to the identification of group members and strangers. The basic, or "type one", song is a one to four second high-pitched reel consisting of 10–20 short elements per second; it is sung by both males and females, particularly when there is a dispute over territory boundaries. Singing occurs most frequently before and just after dawn. Foraging birds maintain contact with each other by soft, repeating see-see-see descending tones, while a loud, sharp tsit serves as an alarm call.

== Distribution and habitat ==
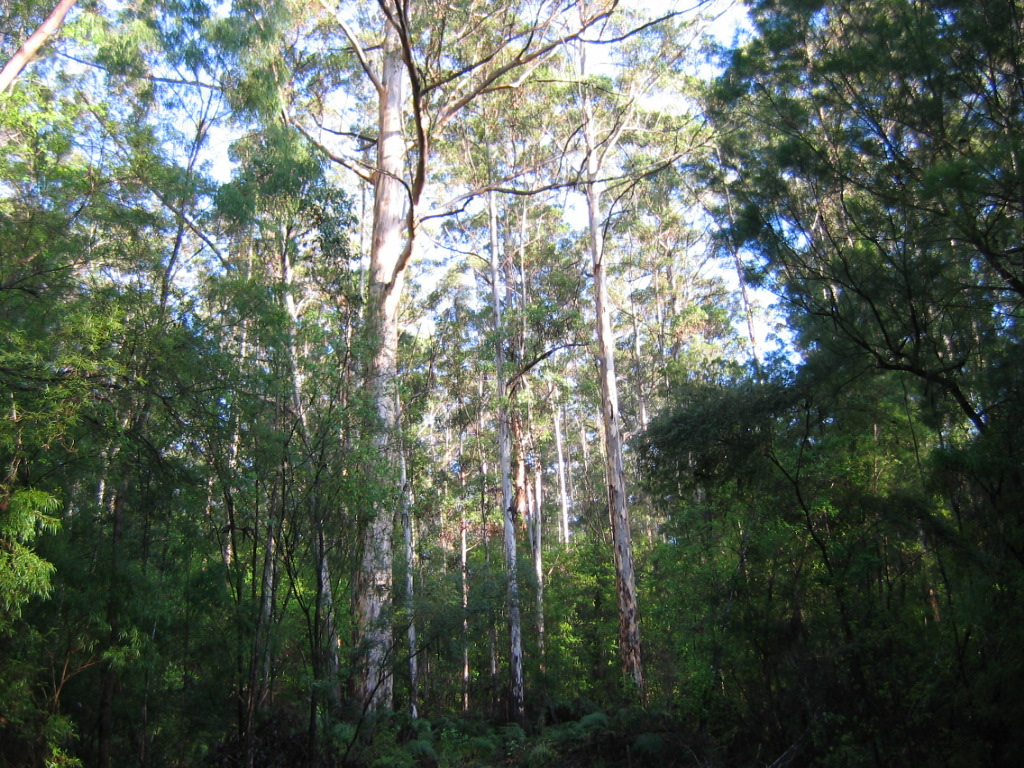
Karri Forest near Pemberton, the preferred habitat

The red-winged fairywren occurs in the wetter, southwest corner of Western Australia, from Moore River north of Perth south through to the Margaret River region and east to Albany. It is common in parts of its range, though there is some evidence of decline from draining of swampland. It lives in the understorey of karri and jarrah. Older forests appear to be less favourable habitats, while birds appear to be attracted to disturbed areas after logging. Fire also results in populations disappearing, returning after a period of two years. Forestry plantations of pine and eucalypts are generally unsuitable as they lack sufficient undergrowth.

Within the forest habitat, the red-winged fairywren prefers wetter gullies and riverside sword sedge. It borders the range of the variegated fairywren on the northern limit of its range, and the blue-breasted fairywren in the eastern limit, with those two species occupying dryer scrub while the red-winged fairywren is restricted to wetter forests. The lack of intermediate forms reinforces the status of all three taxa as separate species.

Sites identified by BirdLife International as being important for red-winged fairywren conservation are Araluen-Wungong, Jalbarragup, Mundaring-Kalamunda, North Dandalup, the Stirling Range, Two Peoples Bay and Mount Manypeaks.

== Behaviour and ecology ==
Hopping, with both feet leaving the ground and landing simultaneously, is the usual form of locomotion, though birds may run while performing the "rodent run display" detailed below. Its balance is assisted by a proportionally large tail, which is usually held upright and rarely still. The short, rounded wings provide good initial lift and are useful for short flights, though not for extended jaunts.

=== Courtship and breeding ===
The red-winged fairywren is a cooperative breeding species, with a pair or small group of birds maintaining and defending a territory year-round. These territories average around 0.4–2.4 hectares (1–6 acres) in optimal habitat of tall karri forest, although are smaller and restricted to dense riverbank undergrowth in less favourable habitats. The area maintained is large enough to support the group in poor years or to accommodate new members after a good breeding season. Groups range from two to nine members in size with an average of four birds, the largest for any fairywren studied to date. This is thought to be due to a very high annual survival and occupancy of suitable territory. Though reproduction rates are low, young birds still have few vacancies available for them to disperse into. Pairs are socially monogamous, with relationships ending for the most part when one partner dies. The survivor in this case selects a new partner, often a helper bird in the group. Though not directly studied, paired red-winged fairywrens are likely to be sexually promiscuous, with each partner mating with other individuals. Female helpers are much more common in this species than the other species intensively studied, the superb fairywren. Over half of the groups have two or more helpers, often female, which feed nestlings and reduce the workload of breeding females. Helpers have been shown to improve reproductive success in this species by increasing the number of young raised successfully per year from 1.3 to 2 birds. There is some evidence that groups with male helpers may enlarge the territory boundaries with a subsequent "budding-off" of a new territory by a helper.

Like other fairywrens, male red-winged fairywrens have been observed carrying brightly coloured petals to display to females as part of a courtship ritual. In this species, the petals that have been recorded have been yellow or, rarely, white. Petals are displayed and presented to a female in the male fairywren's own, or another's, territory. The "face fan" display is commonly seen as a part of aggressive or sexual display behaviours; it involves the flaring of the blue ear tufts by erecting the feathers. The silvery blue upper back feathers are also used more prominently in display than other species.

The breeding season is shorter than that of other fairywrens, occurring from October (rarely September) through to December. Constructed solely by the female, the nest is generally situated in thick vegetation and around 20 cm (8 in) above the ground. It is a round or domed structure made of loosely woven grasses and spider webs, with an entrance in one side. The interior may be lined with finer grass and material from common clematis and Bull Banksia. One or, rarely, two broods may be laid in a season, the second being laid on average 51 days after the first. A clutch consists of two or three matte cream-white eggs, tapered oval in shape with reddish-brown splotches and spots, measuring 12 mm × 16 mm (0.47 in × 0.63 in). The female incubates the eggs alone for around an hour at a time, after which the male calls her and she will leave to forage urgently for 15–30 minutes before returning. Her long tail is often bent from the cramped nest space and is a useful field indicator of nesting. Incubation takes 14 to 15 days, a day less in later broods, and an estimated 94% of eggs hatch successfully. The newly hatched nestlings are altricial–raw red in colour, naked and blind. Within a day, their skin darkens to blue–grey colour as their feathers develop underneath. Sheathed primary feathers emerge through the skin by the third day and eyes begin to open on the fifth day and fully open on the next. Young are fed and their fecal sacs removed by all group members for 11–12 days, by which time they are fledged. Though fully feathered, their tails and wings are not fully grown and they are poor fliers. Their wings take another 10 days to develop fully, during which time they generally stay well hidden in cover near the nest. Parents and helper birds will feed them for around one month after fledging. Young birds often remain in the family group as helpers for a year or more before moving to another group. Birds reach sexual maturity at one year of age, but females tend not to breed until their third year as breeding vacancies are scarce. The nests of red-winged fairywrens rarely play host to brood parasites, though parasitism by the Horsfield's bronze cuckoo and the fan-tailed cuckoo has been recorded.

=== Feeding ===
Like all fairywrens, the red-winged fairywren is an active and restless feeder, foraging in bracken and low shrubs, as well as in leaf-litter on the ground near shelter. It will occasionally ascend trees up to 5 m (16 ft) above the ground in the understorey, particularly in the late summer and autumn as the flaking eucalypt bark is a rich source of arthropods. However, birds are exposed to potential predators and forays are therefore brief. They consumes a wide range of small creatures, mostly insects, eating ants and beetles year-round, and adding spiders, bugs and caterpillars to their diet during breeding season. During spring and summer, birds are active in bursts through the day and accompany their foraging with song. Insects are numerous and easy to catch, which allows the birds to rest between forays. Groups often shelter and rest together during the heat of the day. Food is harder to find during the winter and they are required to spend the day foraging continuously. Ants in particular are an important food source during this period, constituting a high proportion of the diet.

=== Threats ===
Major nest predators include Australian magpies, butcherbirds, laughing kookaburras, currawongs, crows and ravens, and shrike-thrushes as well as introduced mammals such as the red fox, cat and black rat. Like other species of fairywrens, red-winged fairywrens may use a "rodent-run display" to distract predators from nests with young birds. While doing this, the head, neck and tail of the bird are lowered, the wings are held out and the feathers are fluffed as the bird runs rapidly and voices a continuous alarm call.

Observed in this species, the wing-fluttering display is seen in several situations: females responding, and presumably acquiescing, to male courtship displays, juveniles begging for food, by helpers to older birds, and immature males to senior ones. The fairywren lowers its head and tail, outstretches and quivers its wings and holds its beak open silently.

=== Lifespan ===
Survival of fairywrens from one season to the next is generally high for such small birds, and the red-winged fairywren has the highest rate of all—with 78% of breeding males and 77% of breeding females surviving from year to year. It is not unusual for red-winged fairywrens to reach 10 years of age, and the oldest known individual to date attained an age of 16 years.
