= Kalamunda National Park =

National park in Western Australia

- IUCN category II (national park)
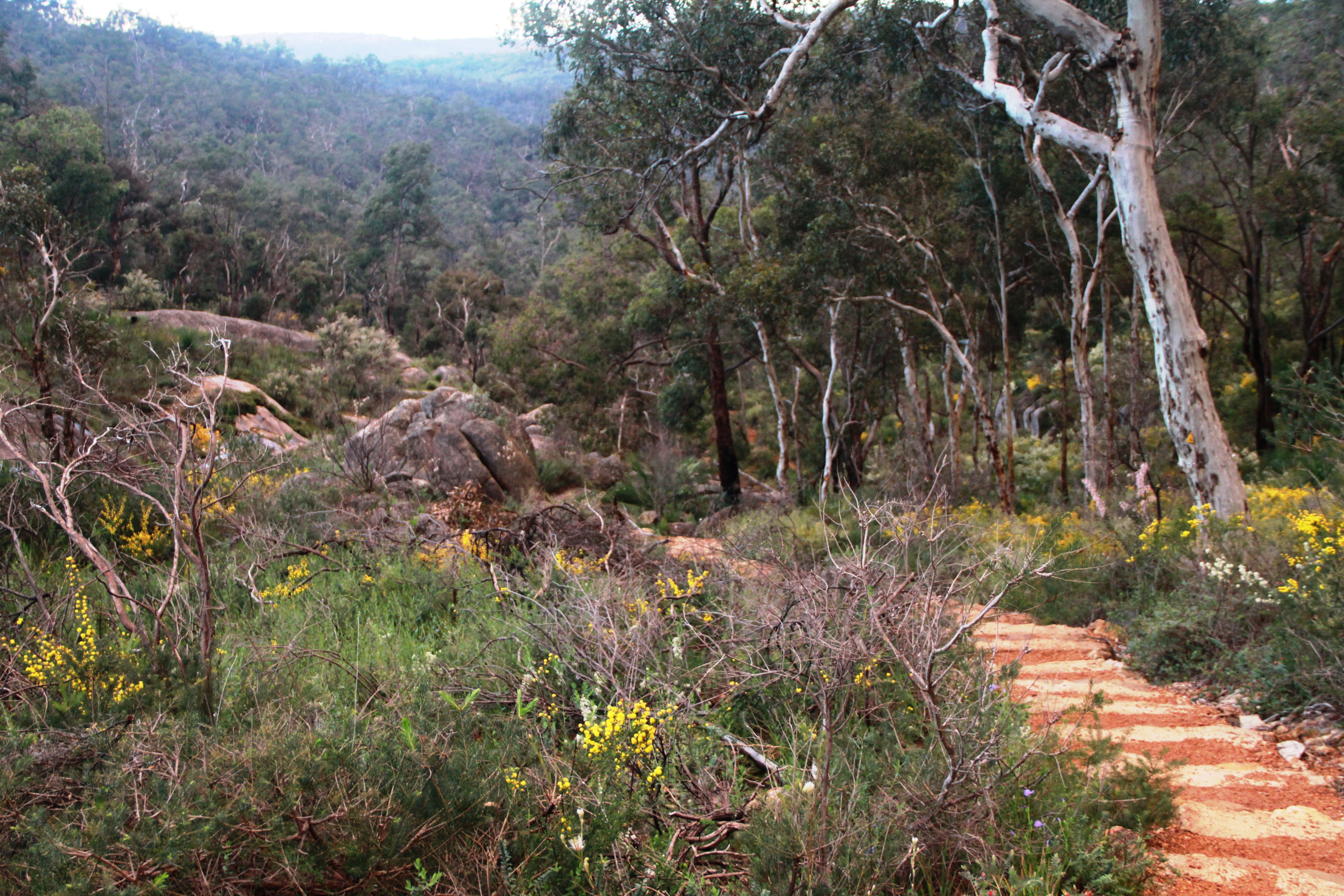
- Bibbulmun Rocky Pool track, Kalamunda

- Location within Western Australia
- Location: Western Australia
- Nearest city: Perth
- Coordinates: 31°57′31″S 116°04′17″E
- Area: 3.75 km^{2} (1.45 sq mi)
- Established: 1964
- Governing body: Department of Environment and Conservation
- Website: Official website

Kalamunda National Park is a national park in Western Australia, 23 kilometres (14 mi) east of Perth, near the town of Kalamunda.

== Description ==
The park is composed of typical Darling Scarp woodland including species of marri, jarrah and wandoo with a diverse understorey including a range of wildflowers.

Piesse Brook flows through the park before joining the Helena River, making the park and important catchment area for both the Helena and the Swan Rivers.

No fees apply to enter the park but facilities exist within the park for visitors apart from several walk trails including the northern end of the Bibbulmun Track.

== Important Bird Area ==
The park lies within the Mundaring-Kalamunda Important Bird Area, so identified by BirdLife International because of its importance as a non-breeding season roost site and foraging base for long-billed black cockatoos.

== See also ==
- Protected areas of Western Australia
