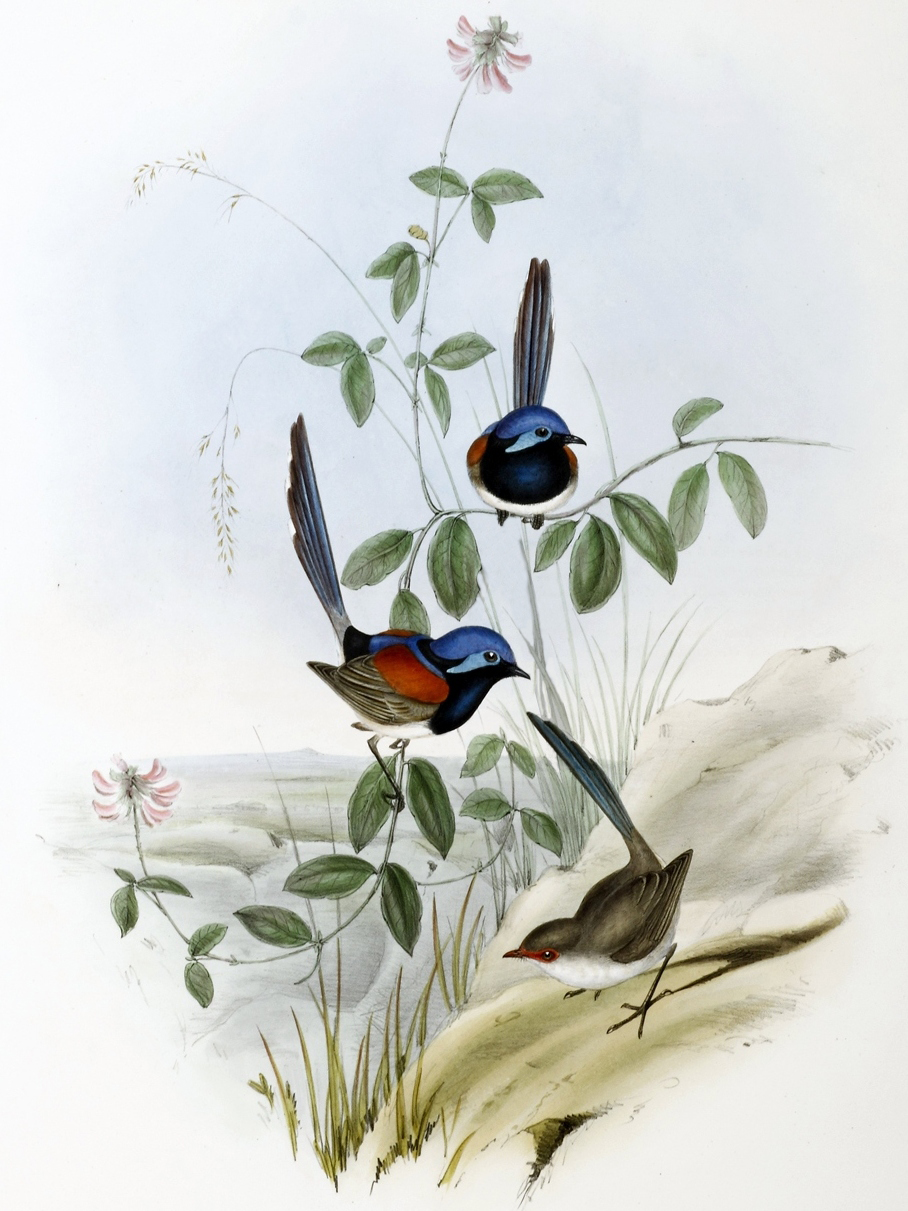

Conservation status
- Least Concern (IUCN 3.1)

Scientific classification
- Kingdom: Animalia
- Phylum: Chordata
- Class: Aves
- Order: Passeriformes
- Family: Maluridae
- Genus: Malurus
- Species: M. pulcherrimus

Binomial name
- Malurus pulcherrimus Gould, 1844
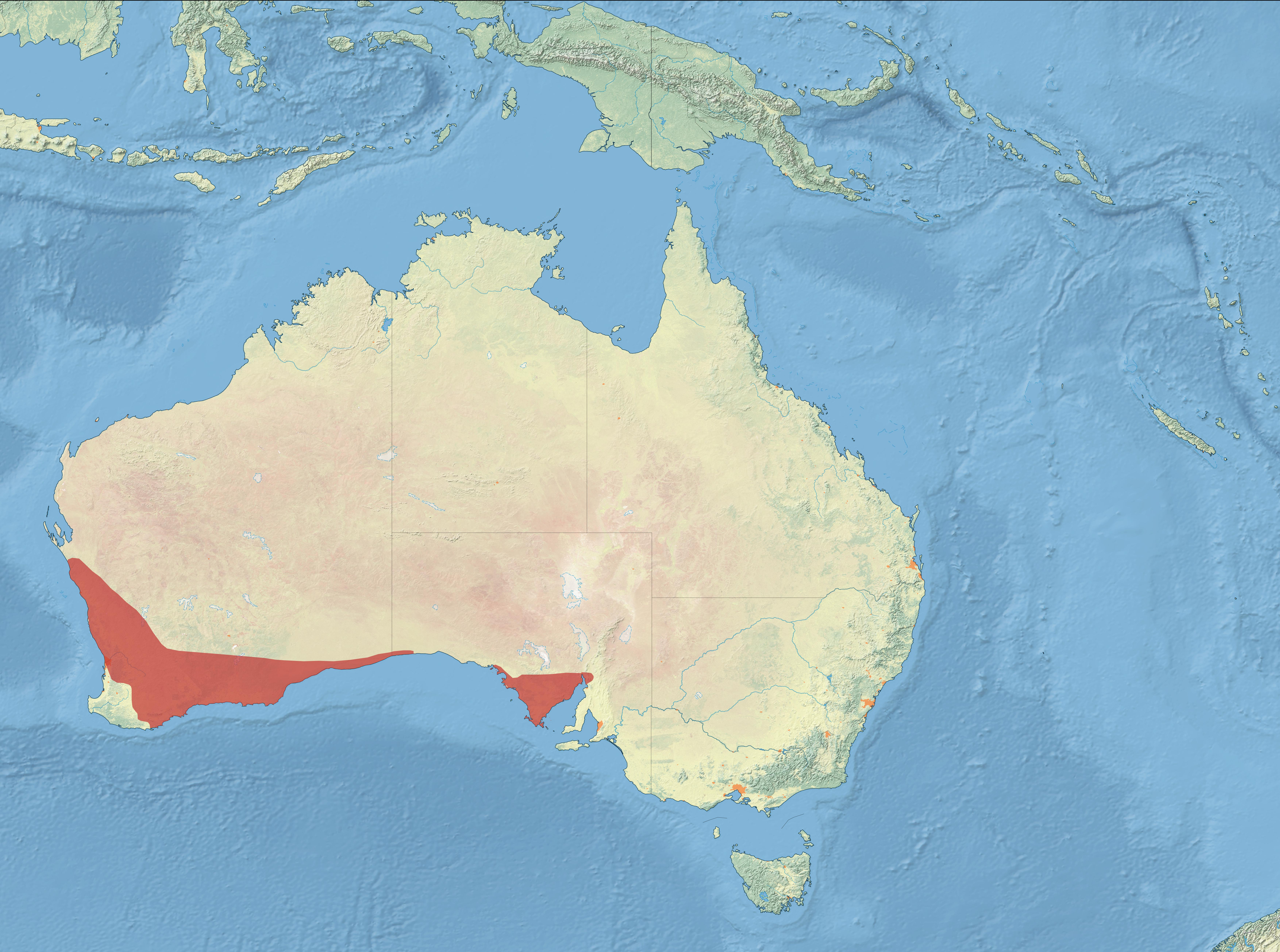
- Distribution of the blue-breasted fairywren

= Blue-breasted fairywren =

Species of bird

The blue-breasted fairywren (Malurus pulcherrimus), or blue-breasted wren, is a species of passerine bird in the Australasian wren family, Maluridae. It is non-migratory and endemic to southern Western Australia and the Eyre Peninsula in South Australia. Exhibiting a high degree of sexual dimorphism, the male adopts a brilliantly coloured breeding plumage, with a bright blue crown, ear coverts and upper back, red shoulders, contrasting with a dark blue throat, grey-brown tail and wings and pale underparts. Non-breeding males, females and juveniles have predominantly grey-brown plumage. No separate subspecies are recognised.

== Taxonomy and systematics ==
John Gould described the blue-breasted fairywren in 1844. Its species name is the Latin adjective pulcherrimus "very pretty".

It is one of eleven species of the genus Malurus, commonly known as fairywrens, found in Australia and lowland New Guinea. Within the genus it belongs to a group of four very similar species known collectively as chestnut-shouldered fairywrens. The other three species are the lovely fairywren, the variegated fairywren, and the red-winged fairywren. Molecular study showed the blue-breasted fairywren to be the most closely related to the red-winged fairywren.

Like other fairywrens, the blue-breasted fairywren is unrelated to the true wrens. Initially fairywrens were thought to be a member of the Old World flycatcher family Muscicapidae or warbler family Sylviidae before being placed in the newly recognised Maluridae in 1975. More recently, DNA analysis has shown the family to be related to the honeyeaters (Meliphagidae) and the pardalotes (Pardalotidae) in a large superfamily Meliphagoidea.

=== Evolutionary history ===
In his 1982 monograph, ornithologist Richard Schodde proposed a northern origin for the chestnut-shouldered fairywren species complex due to the variety of forms in the north and their absence in the southeast of the continent. Ancestral birds spread south and colonised the southwest during a warmer and wetter period around 2 million years ago at the end of the Pliocene or beginning of the Pleistocene. Subsequent cooler and drier conditions resulted in the loss of habitat and fragmentation of populations. South-western birds gave rise to what is now the red-winged fairywren, while those in the northwest of the continent became the variegated fairywren. Continuing warmer, humid conditions again allowed birds to spread southwards; this group, occupying central southern Australia east to the Eyre Peninsula, became the blue-breasted fairywren. Cooler climate after this resulted in this being isolated as well and evolving into a separate species. Finally, after the end of the last glacial period 12,000–13,000 years ago, the northern variegated forms have again spread southwards. This has resulted in the ranges of all three species overlapping.

== Description ==
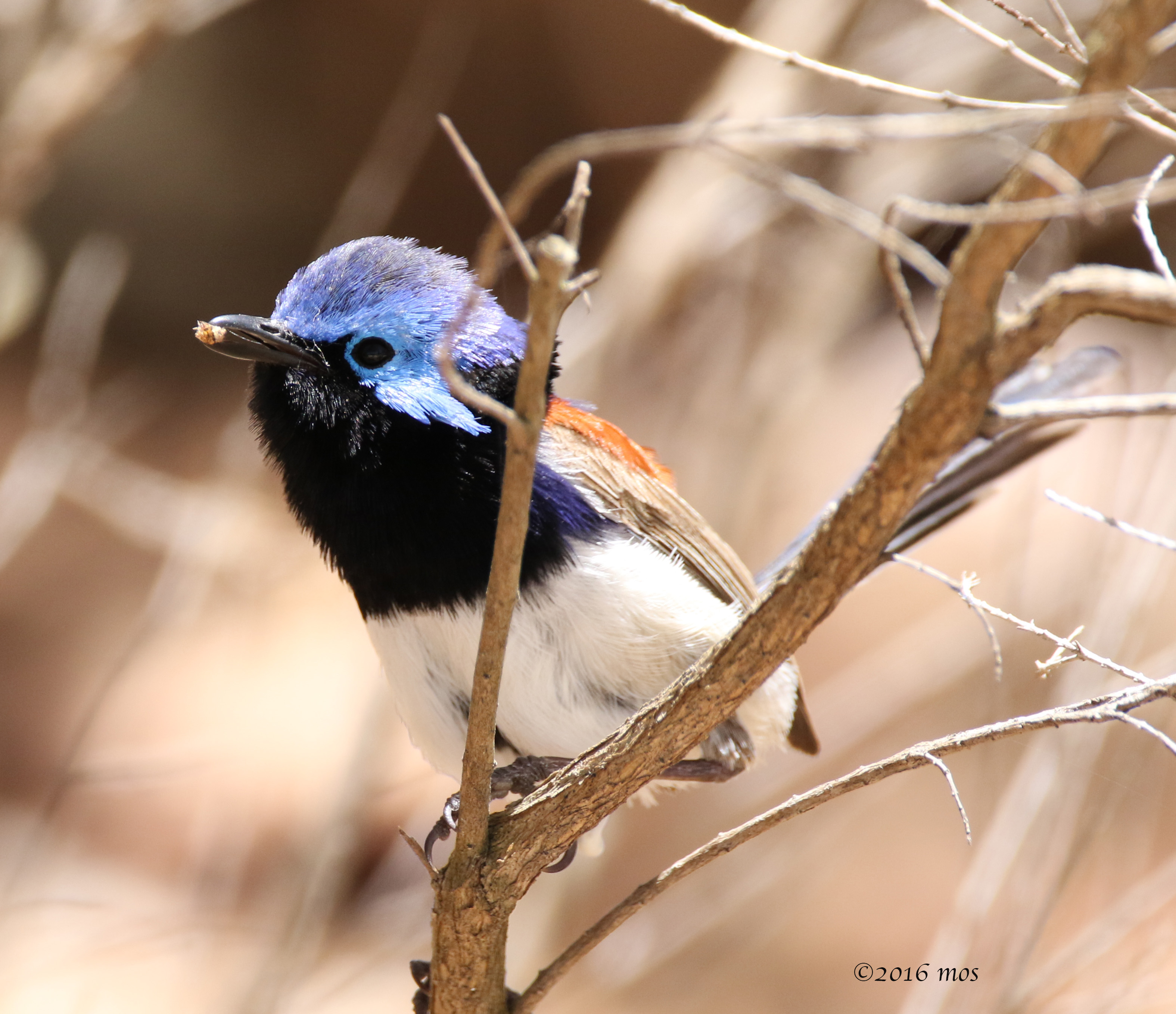
Blue-breasted fairy-wren, Kings Park, Perth

The contact call is a soft, short reed-like trill. The alarm call is the typical Malurus short churring notes repeatedly spat out and taken up by all members of the group. The males have the least distinctive song of the Australasian wren family; a soft whirring, buzzing trill, usually given from a sheltered vantage point deep within the foliage of shrubby vegetation.

== Distribution and habitat ==
The range of the blue-breasted fairywren is inland south-western Western Australia and the Eyre Peninsula of South Australia. Originally it was thought to only occur in Western Australia, but was later found in the more eastward area, where it was for some time mistaken for one of the many forms of the variegated wren. The distribution of the species is unusual in that there is a gap in their range of three hundred kilometres; from the head of the Great Australian Bight to their reappearance on Eyre Peninsula.

== Behaviour and ecology ==
It is not a common species, and being secretive by nature it is not an easy bird to observe. However, the females may be induced to show themselves if the wren distress call is imitated. The adult males are even more shy than the females and are usually only glimpsed skulking in the bushes.

=== Breeding ===
The comparatively short breeding season is from August to November. This means the species usually only has time to raise one, sometimes two, clutches per year. Only females have been observed nest building, and brooding the eggs and young. The time taken to complete a nest is roughly a week. The average clutch consists of three ovoid creamy eggs speckled with coarse smudges and blotches of reddish-brown, particularly on the larger end.

Little is known of the incubation period and the rearing of the young, but these tasks are probably similar in nature to the other closely related members of the wren family. However, both parents, and other members of the individual family group, have been observed feeding the nestlings.

If the nest, or young, are threatened both adult sexes employ the "rodent-run" predator distracting technique typical of the Maluridae.

=== Feeding ===
Blue-breasted wrens are predominantly ground feeders, taking beetles, grubs, ants, weevils flies, wasps and other small invertebrates.
