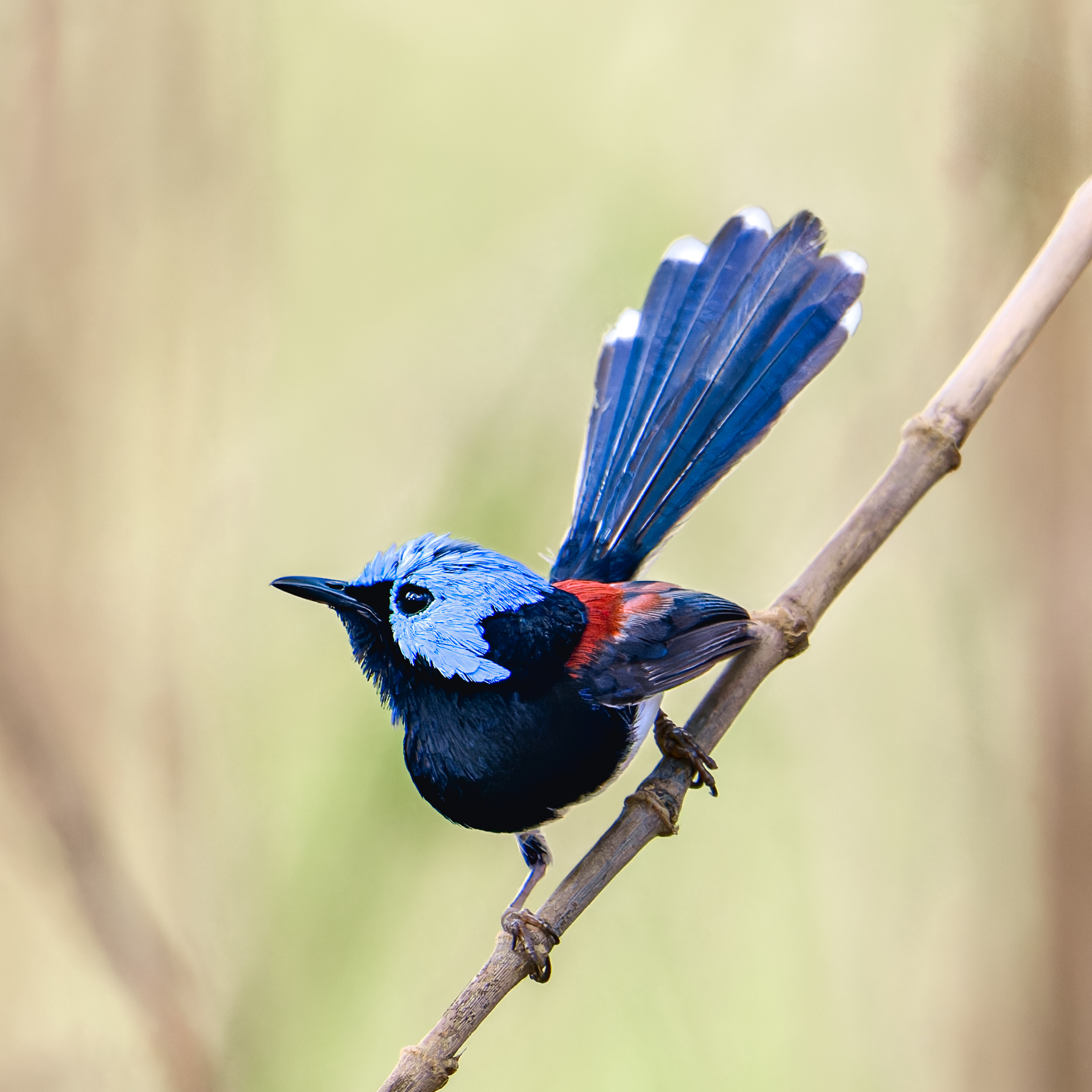
- Male
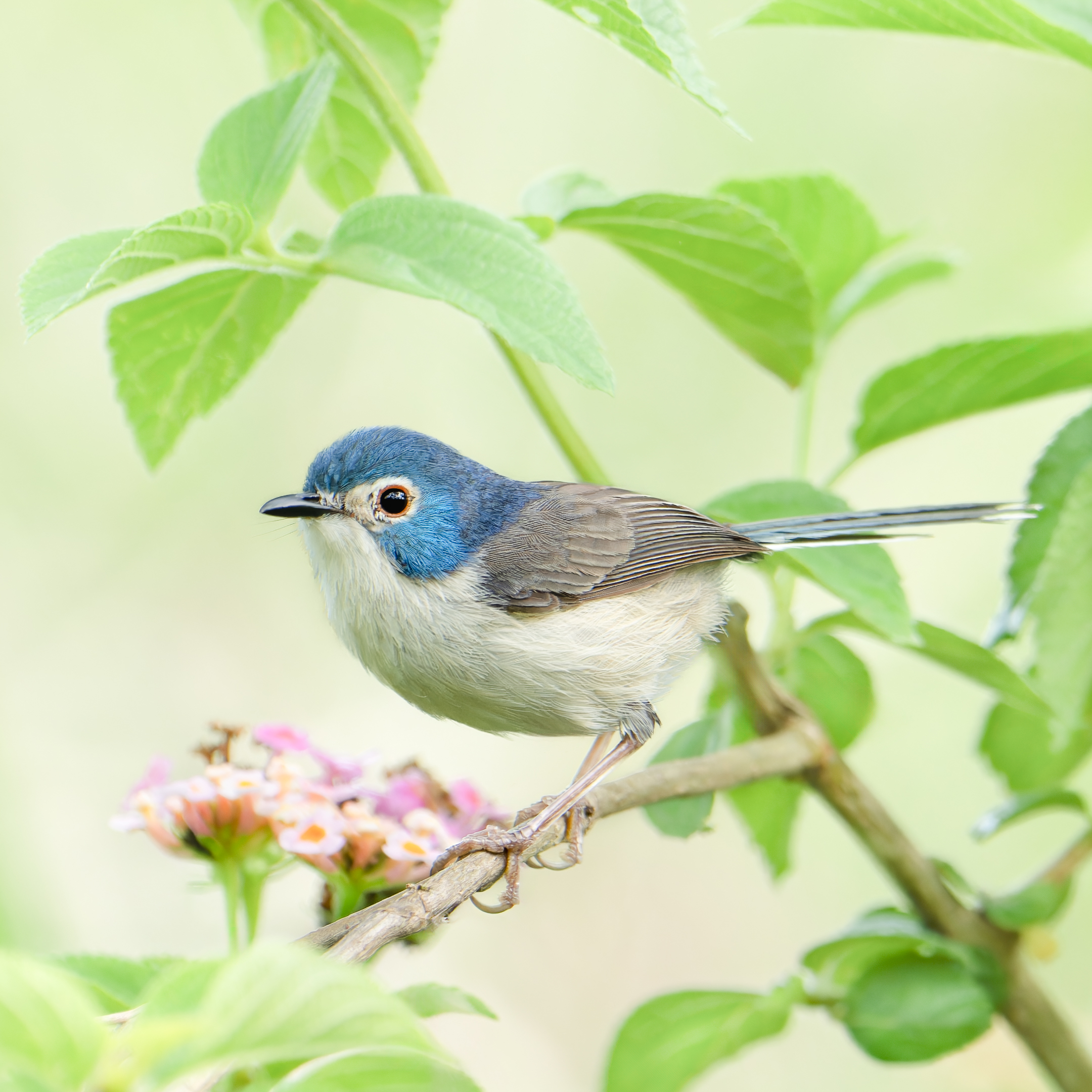
- Female

Conservation status
- Least Concern (IUCN 3.1)

Scientific classification
- Kingdom: Animalia
- Phylum: Chordata
- Class: Aves
- Order: Passeriformes
- Family: Maluridae
- Genus: Malurus
- Species: M. amabilis

Binomial name
- Malurus amabilis Gould, 1852

= Lovely fairywren =

Species of bird

The lovely fairywren (Malurus amabilis), or lovely wren, is a species of bird in the Australasian wren family, Maluridae. It is endemic to northeastern Australia. Its natural habitats are subtropical or tropical dry forest and subtropical or tropical moist lowland forest.

== Taxonomy and systematics ==
It is one of twelve species of the genus Malurus, commonly known as fairywrens, found in Australia and lowland New Guinea. Within the genus it belongs to a group of five very similar species known collectively as chestnut-shouldered fairywrens. The other four species are the variegated fairywren, purple-backed fairywren, red-winged fairywren, and the blue-breasted fairywren. A 2011 analysis of mitochondrial and nuclear DNA found that the lovely fairywren is the sister taxon of the Purple-backed fairywren.

The lovely fairywren was first described by the ornithologist John Gould in 1852, from a male specimen collected by Captain Owen Stanley in Cape York. Gould expected that a female would resemble that of a red-winged fairywren, and consequently described female specimens collected by John Jardine as a new species, Malurus hypoleucos. The generic name Malurus is from the Greek malos (soft) and oura (tail), while the specific epithet comes from the Latin adjective ămābǐlis, meaning lovely. Lovely fairywren has been designated as its official name by the IOU. Other names for the species include lovely fairy-wren.

== Description ==
Like other fairywrens, the lovely fairywren is notable for its marked sexual dimorphism, males adopting a highly visible breeding plumage of brilliant iridescent blue and chestnut contrasting with black and grey-brown. The brightly coloured crown and ear tufts are prominently featured in breeding displays. The male in breeding plumage has striking azure blue ear coverts, crown and upper back, a black throat and nape, chestnut shoulders and a white-tipped blue tail. The wings are black and the belly white. The female has smoky blue upperparts and tail, with turquoise ear tufts, and dark grey wings, and white below. Both sexes have black bills, brown eyes and flesh-grey feet. Immature birds resemble females but have brown bills.

== Behaviour and ecology ==
=== Diet ===
The lovely fairywren is insectivorous and eats several types of insects, including caterpillars.

=== Breeding ===
The lovely fairywren is brood-parasitized by the brush cuckoo.

== Works cited ==
- Driskell, Amy C.; Norman, Janette A.; Pruett-Jones, Stephen; Mangall, Elizabeth; Sonsthagen, Sarah; Christidis, Les (2011). "A multigene phylogeny examining evolutionary and ecological relationships in the Australo-papuan wrens of the subfamily Malurinae (Aves)". Molecular Phylogenetics and Evolution. 60 (3): 480–85. Bibcode:2011MolPE..60..480D. doi:10.1016/j.ympev.2011.03.030. PMID 21466855.
- Rowley, Ian; Russell, Eleanor (1997). Bird Families of the World: Fairy-wrens and Grasswrens. Oxford: Oxford University Press. ISBN 0-19-854690-4.
- Simpson, D.P. (1979). Cassell's Latin Dictionary (5th ed.). London: Cassell. ISBN 0-304-52257-0.
