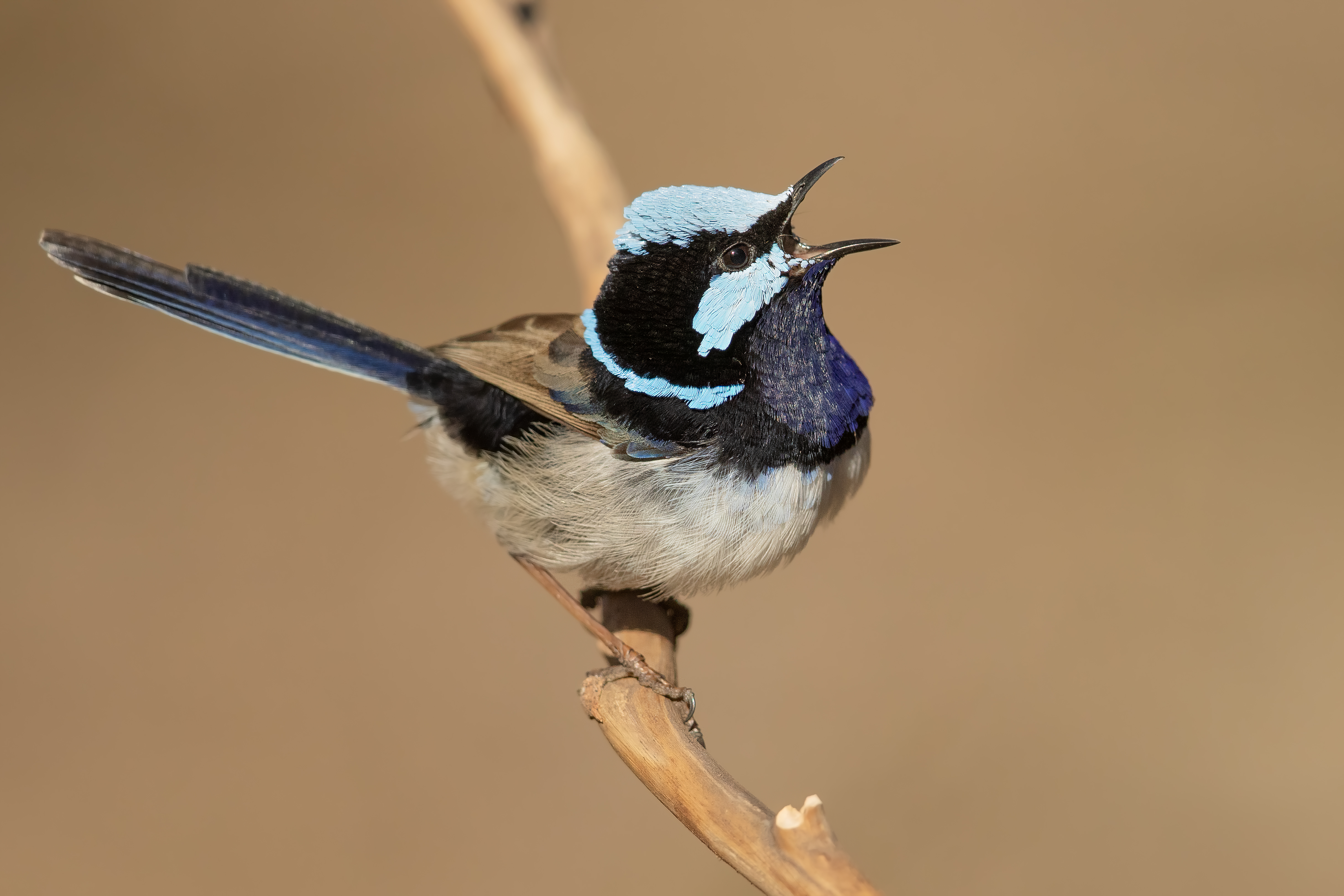
- Male in breeding plumage subspecies cyanochlamys
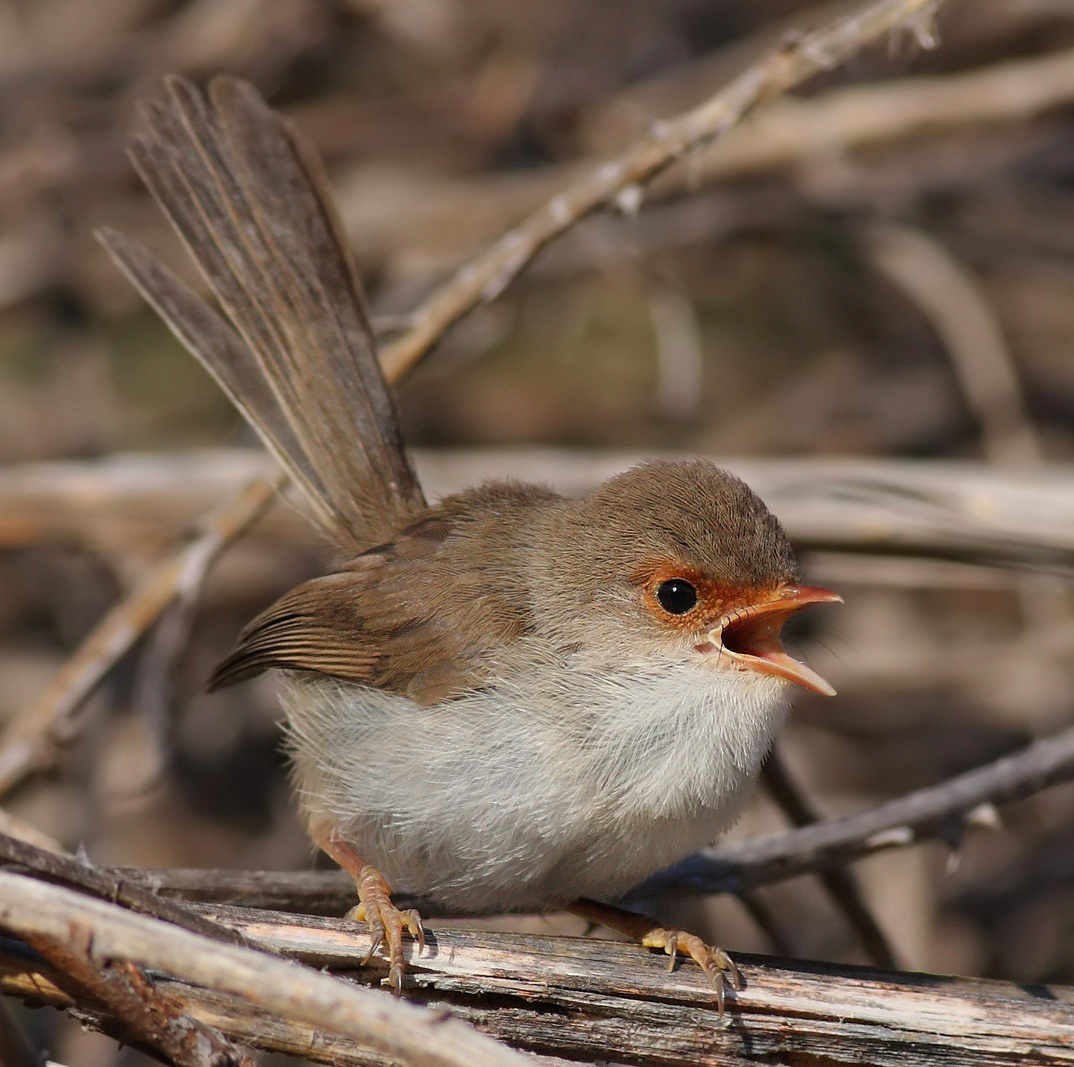
- Female – Victorian High Country

Conservation status
- Least Concern (IUCN 3.1)

Scientific classification
- Kingdom: Animalia
- Phylum: Chordata
- Class: Aves
- Order: Passeriformes
- Family: Maluridae
- Genus: Malurus
- Species: M. cyaneus

Binomial name
- Malurus cyaneus (Ellis, 1782)

Subspecies
- 6, see text
- Superb fairywren range

Synonyms
- Motacilla cyanea

= Superb fairywren =

Species of bird

The superb fairywren (Malurus cyaneus) is a passerine bird in the Australasian wren family, Maluridae, and is common and familiar across south-eastern Australia. It is a sedentary and territorial species, also exhibiting a high degree of sexual dimorphism; the male in breeding plumage has a striking bright blue forehead, ear coverts, mantle, and tail, with a black mask and black or dark blue throat. Non-breeding males, females and juveniles are predominantly grey-brown in colour; this gave the early impression that males were polygamous, as all dull-coloured birds were taken for females. Six subspecies groups are recognized: three larger and darker forms from Tasmania, Flinders and King Island respectively, and three smaller and paler forms from mainland Australia and Kangaroo Island.

Like other fairywrens, the superb fairywren is notable for several peculiar behavioural characteristics; the birds are socially monogamous and sexually promiscuous, meaning that although they form pairs between one male and one female, each partner will mate with other individuals and even assist in raising the young from such pairings. Male wrens pluck yellow petals and display them to females as part of a courtship display.

The superb fairywren can be found in almost any area that has at least a little dense undergrowth for shelter, including grasslands with scattered shrubs, moderately thick forest, woodland, heaths, and domestic gardens. It has adapted well to the urban environment and is common in suburban Sydney, Canberra, Melbourne and Brisbane. The superb fairywren eats mostly insects and supplements its diet with seeds.

The superb fairywren was named 'Australian Bird of the Year' for 2021, after a survey conducted by Birdlife Australia saw the species narrowly defeat the tawny frogmouth with a margin of 666 votes (over 400,000 votes were cast in total).

== Taxonomy and systematics ==
The superb fairywren is one of twelve species of the genus Malurus, commonly known as fairywrens, found in Australia and lowland New Guinea. Within the genus, the superb fairywren's closest relative is the splendid fairywren; these two "blue wrens" are also related to the purple-crowned fairywren of northwestern Australia.

William Anderson, surgeon and naturalist on Captain James Cook's third voyage, collected the first superb fairywren specimen in 1777 while traveling off the coast of eastern Tasmania, in Bruny Island's Adventure Bay. He classified it in the genus Motacilla because its tail reminded him of the European wagtails. Anderson did not live to publish his findings, although his assistant William Ellis described the bird in 1782. The genus Malurus was later described by Louis Pierre Vieillot in 1816, giving the bird its current scientific name.

Shortly after the First Fleet's arrival at Port Jackson, Sydney, the bird gained the common name superb warbler. In the 1920s came common names wren and wren-warbler—both from its similarity to the European wren—and fairywren. The bird has also been called Mormon wren, a reference to observations of one blue-plumaged bird accompanied by many brown-plumaged birds, which were incorrectly assumed to be all female. The Ngarrindjeri people of the Murray River and Coorong regions call it waatji pulyeri, meaning "little one of the waatji (lignum) bush", and the Gunai call it deeydgun, meaning "little bird with long tail". Both it and the variegated fairywren are known as muruduwin to the local Eora and Darug inhabitants of the Sydney basin. Other alternative names for the superb fairywren include the Australian fairywren, blue wren, superb blue fairywren, and superb blue wren.

Like other fairywrens, the superb fairywren is unrelated to the true wren. It was previously classified as a member of the Old World flycatcher family Muscicapidae and later as a member of the warbler family Sylviidae before being placed in the newly recognised Maluridae in 1975. More recently, DNA analysis has shown the family Maluridae to be related to the Meliphagidae (honeyeaters), and the Pardalotidae (pardalotes, scrubwrens, thornbills, gerygones and allies) in the large superfamily Meliphagoidea. To help resolve this uncertainty, a high-quality 1.07‐Gb reference genome was sequenced in 2019.

=== Subspecies ===
Six subspecies are currently recognized:

- M. c. cyaneus – (Ellis, 1782): The nominate subspecies, it is found throughout Tasmania. Birds are larger and darker than the mainland subspecies, with males having a deeper azure blue coloration. Some authorities have also reclassified subspecies elizabethae and samueli under M. c. cyaneus.
- M. c. samueli – Mathews, 1912: Endemic to Flinders Island and has males that are of intermediate colour between the King Island and Tasmanian subspecies.
- M. c. elizabethae – Campbell, AJ, 1901: Originally described as a separate species. Is endemic to King Island Males have a deeper blue colour than Tasmanian birds. King Island birds also have longer tarsi (lower legs).
- M. c. cyanochlamys – Sharpe, 1881: Originally described as a separate species. Found on mainland Australia. In general, birds are smaller and paler than those of Tasmania, with Queensland male birds bearing a pale silvery blue crown, ear tufts and mantle.
- M. c. leggei – Mathews, 1912: Found in eastern South Australia. Males in breeding plumage differ from those of subspecies cyanochlamys by having blue tinges on their belly below the chest band and on their wing remiges.
- M. c. ashbyi – Mathews, 1912: Found on Kangaroo Island, and has been separated from the mainland subspecies for around 9000 years. Birds of this subspecies are larger, have narrower bills and darker plumage than birds on nearby mainland South Australia. Females from Kangaroo Island are more uniformly grey in plumage than mainland birds.

=== Evolutionary history ===
In his 1982 monograph, Schodde proposed a southern origin for the common ancestor of the superb and splendid fairywrens. At some time in the past it was split into south-western (splendid) and south-eastern (superb) enclaves. As the southwest was drier than the southeast, once conditions were more favourable, the splendid forms were more able to spread into inland areas. In the east, the superb fairywren spread into Tasmania during a glacial period when the sea level was low and the island was connected with the rest of the continent via a land bridge. This gave rise to the subspecies cyaneus as it became isolated when the sea levels rose. The Bass Strait forms were isolated from Tasmania more recently and so their subspecific status was not maintained. A 2017 genetic study using both mitochondrial and nuclear DNA found the ancestors of the superb and splendid fairywrens diverged from each other around 4 million years ago, and their common ancestor diverged around 7 million years ago from a lineage that gave rise to the white-shouldered, white-winged and red-backed fairywrens.

== Description ==
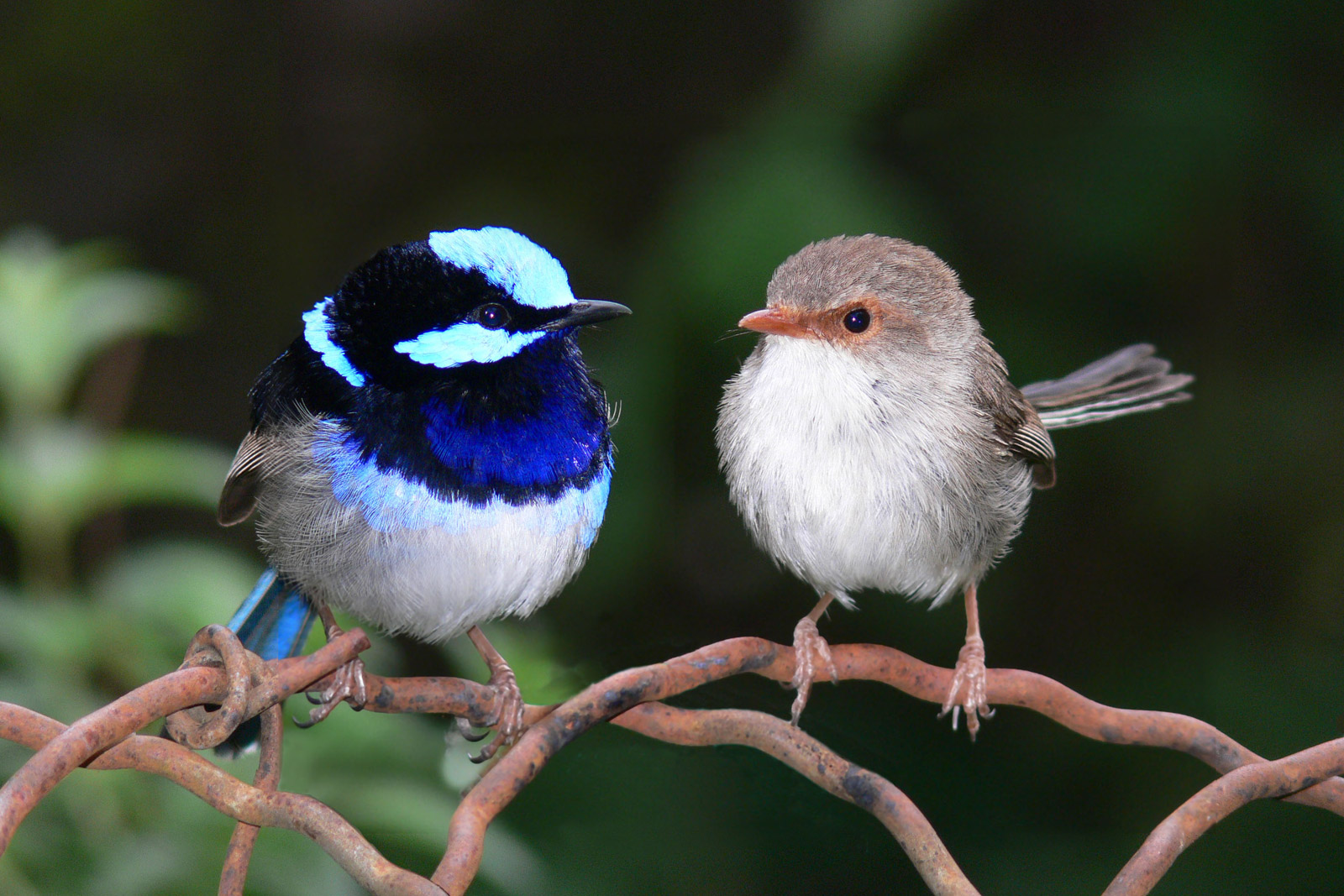
A pair in Ensay, Victoria, Australia

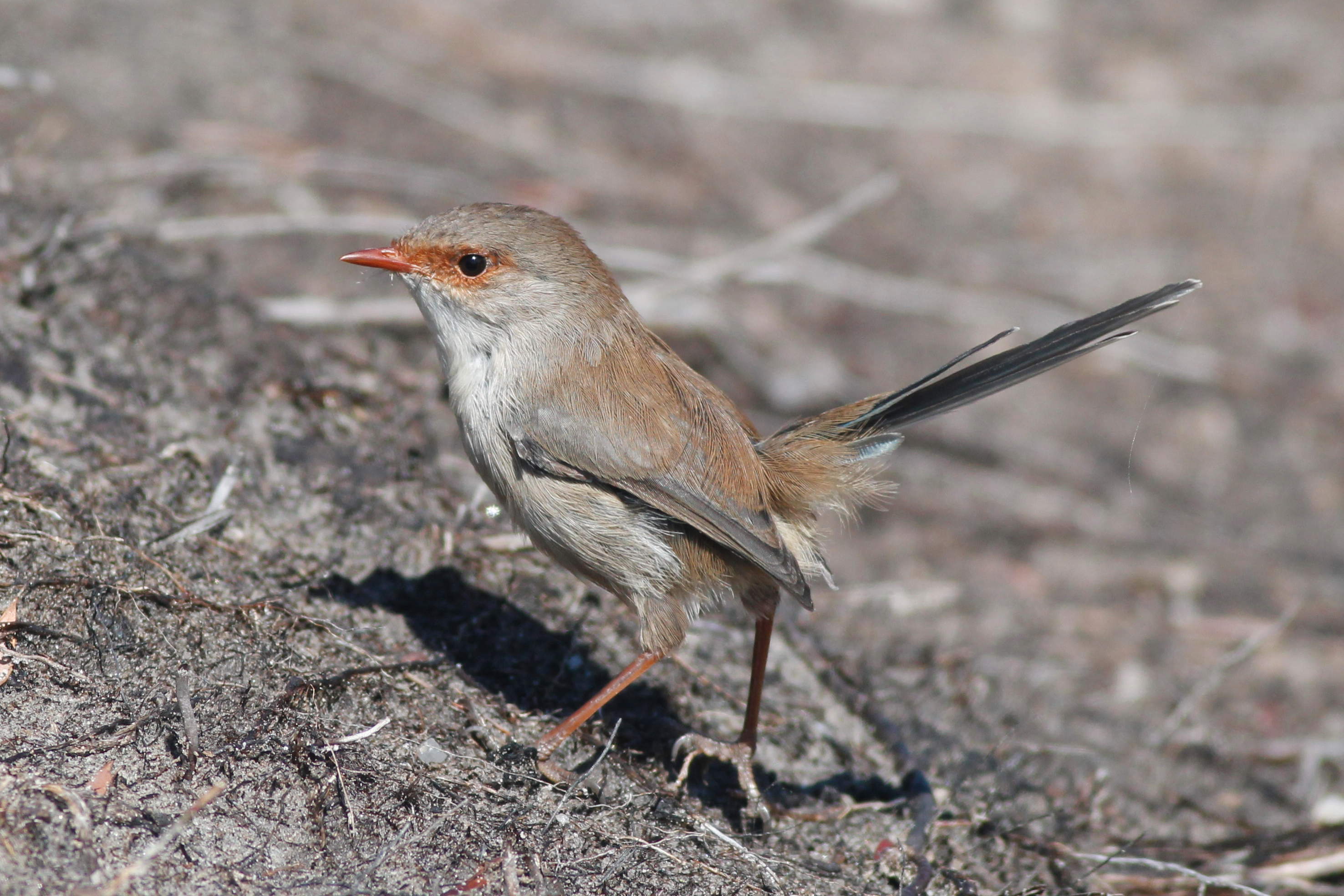
An immature male in Gippsland, Victoria, Australia. Young males usually develop a dark bill and blue tail before their first winter.

The superb fairywren is 14 cm (5 1/2 in) long and weighs 8–13 g (0.28–0.46 oz), with males on average slightly larger than females. The average tail length is 5.9 cm (2 1/3 in), among the shortest in the genus. Averaging 9 mm (0.4 in) in subspecies cyaneus and 8 mm (0.3 in) in subspecies cyanochlamys, the bill is relatively long, narrow and pointed and wider at the base. Wider than it is deep, the bill is similar in shape to those of other birds that feed by probing for or picking insects off their environs.

Like other fairywrens, the superb fairywren is notable for its marked sexual dimorphism, males adopting a highly visible breeding plumage of brilliant iridescent blue contrasting with black and grey-brown. The brightly coloured crown and ear tufts are prominently featured in breeding displays. The breeding male has a bright-blue forehead, ear coverts, mantle and tail, brown wings, and black throat, eye band, breast and bill. Females, immatures, and non-breeding males are a plain fawn colour with a lighter underbelly and a fawn (females and immatures) or dull greyish blue (males) tail. The bill is brown in females and juveniles and black in males after their first winter. Immature males moult into breeding plumage the first breeding season after hatching, though incomplete moulting sometimes leaves residual brownish plumage that takes another year or two to perfect. Both sexes moult in autumn after breeding, with males assuming an eclipse non-breeding plumage. They moult again into nuptial plumage in winter or spring. Breeding males' blue plumage, particularly the ear-coverts, is highly iridescent because of the flattened and twisted surface of the barbules. The blue plumage also reflects ultraviolet light strongly, and so may be even more prominent to other fairywrens, whose colour vision extends into this part of the spectrum.

=== Vocalisations ===
Vocal communication among superb fairywrens is used primarily for communication between birds in a social group and for advertising and mobbing, or defending a territory. The basic, or Type I, song is a 1–4 second high-pitched reel consisting of 10–20 short elements per second; it is sung by both males and females. Males also possess a peculiar song-like Type II vocalization, which is given in response to the calls of predatory birds, commonly grey butcherbirds. The purpose of this behaviour, which does not elicit a response from other nearby wrens, remains unknown. It is not a warning call, but in fact gives away the location of the vocalizing male to the predator. It may serve to announce male fitness, but this is far from certain. The superb fairywrens' alarm call is a series of brief sharp chits, universally given and understood by small birds in response to predators. Females also emit a purr while incubating. The bird appears to also use vocalisations as a password for its chicks to give it a chance to avoid cuckoo parasites.

== Distribution and habitat ==
At Samsonvale Cemetery, SE Queensland

The superb fairywren is common throughout most of the relatively wet and fertile south-eastern corner of the continent, from the south-east of South Australia (including Kangaroo Island and Adelaide) and the tip of the Eyre Peninsula, through all of Victoria, Tasmania, coastal and sub-coastal New South Wales and Queensland, through the Brisbane area and extending inland – north to the Dawson River and west to Blackall; it is a common bird in the suburbs of Sydney, Melbourne and Canberra. It is found in wooded areas, generally with plenty of undergrowth, and has also adapted to urban existence and can be found in gardens and urban parks as long as there is an undergrowth of native plants nearby. Lantana (Lantana camara), a prolific weed in Australia, has also been beneficial in providing shelter in disturbed areas, as has the introduced and invasive blackberry Unlike other fairywrens, it appears to benefit from the urban environment and has out-competed the introduced house sparrow in one study on the grounds of the Australian National University in Canberra. Colonies of wrens can be found in Hyde Park and the Royal Botanic Gardens in Sydney's urbanized centre. It is not found in dense forest nor in alpine environments. Forestry plantations of pine and eucalypts are also unsuitable as they lack undergrowth.

== Behaviour ==
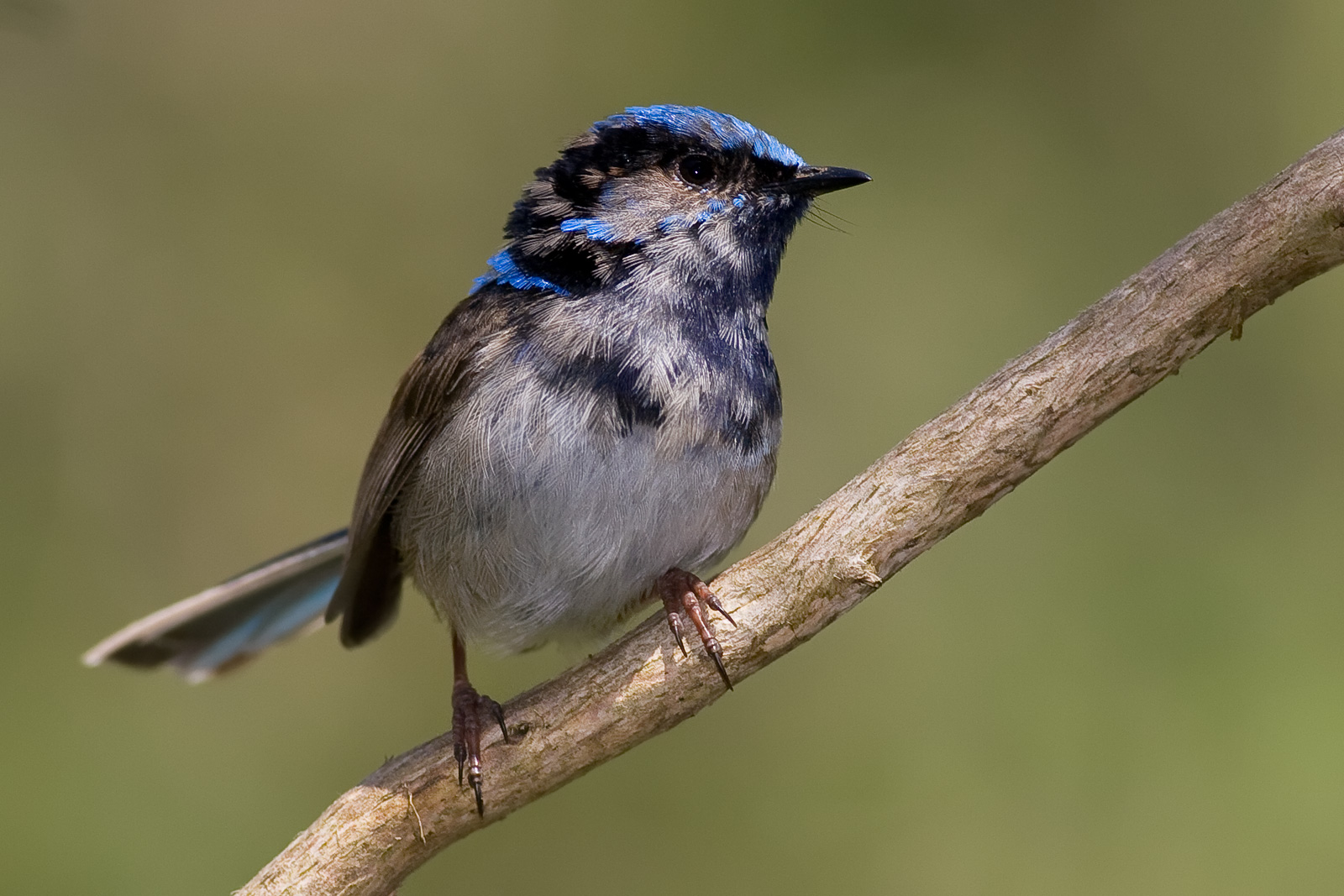
First-year male starting to moult into breeding plumage subspecies cyaneus

Like all fairywrens, the superb fairywren is an active and restless feeder, particularly on open ground near shelter, but also through the lower foliage. Movement is a series of jaunty hops and bounces, with its balance assisted by a proportionally large tail, which is usually held upright, and rarely still. The short, rounded wings provide good initial lift and are useful for short flights, though not for extended jaunts. During spring and summer, birds are active in bursts through the day and accompany their foraging with song. Insects are numerous and easy to catch, which allows the birds to rest between forays. The group often shelters and rests together during the heat of the day. Food is harder to find during winter and they are required to spend the day foraging continuously.

The superb fairywren is a cooperative breeding species, with pairs or groups of 3–5 birds maintaining and defending small territories year-round. The group consists of a social pair with one or more male or female helper birds that were hatched in the territory, though they may not necessarily be the offspring of the main pair. These birds assist in defending the territory and feeding and rearing the young. Birds in a group roost side-by-side in dense cover as well as engaging in mutual preening.

Major nest predators include Australian magpies, butcherbirds, laughing kookaburra, currawongs, crows and ravens, shrike-thrushes as well as introduced mammals such as the red fox, cat and black rat. Superb fairywrens may utilise a 'rodent-run' display to distract predators from nests with young birds. The head, neck and tail are lowered, wings held out and feathers fluffed as the bird runs rapidly and voices a continuous alarm call. A field study in Canberra found that superb fairywrens that lived in areas frequented by noisy miners recognised miner alarm calls and took flight, and had learnt to ignore their non-alarm calls, while those that live in areas not frequented by noisy miners did not respond to miner alarm calls. This suggests the species has adapted and learned to discriminate and respond to another species' vocalisations.

=== Courtship ===
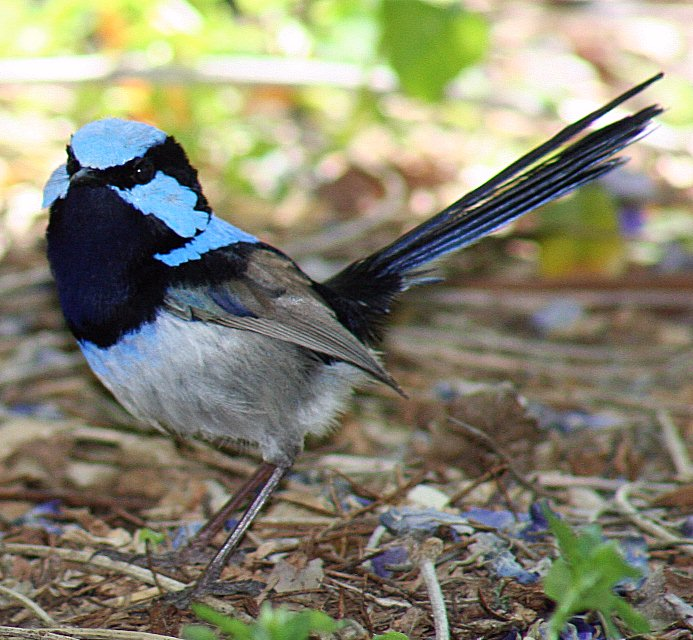
Male subspecies cyanochlamys with face fan display

Several courtship displays by superb fairywren males have been recorded. The 'sea horse flight', named for its seahorse-like undulations, is one such display. During this exaggerated flight, the male—with his neck extended and his head feathers erect—tilts his body from horizontal to vertical, and descends slowly and springs upwards by rapidly beating his wings after alighting on the ground. The 'face fan' display may be seen as a part of aggressive or sexual display behaviours; it involves the flaring of the blue ear tufts by erecting the feathers.

During the reproductive season, males of this and other fairywren species pluck yellow petals, which contrast with their plumage, and show them to female fairywrens. The petals often form part of a courtship display and are presented to a female in the male fairywren's own or another territory. Males sometimes show petals to females in other territories even outside the breeding season, presumably to promote themselves. Fairywrens are socially monogamous and sexually promiscuous: pairs will bond for life, though both males and females will regularly mate with other individuals; a proportion of young will have been fathered by males from outside the group. Young are often raised not by the pair alone, but with other males who also mated with the pair's female assisting.

=== Breeding ===
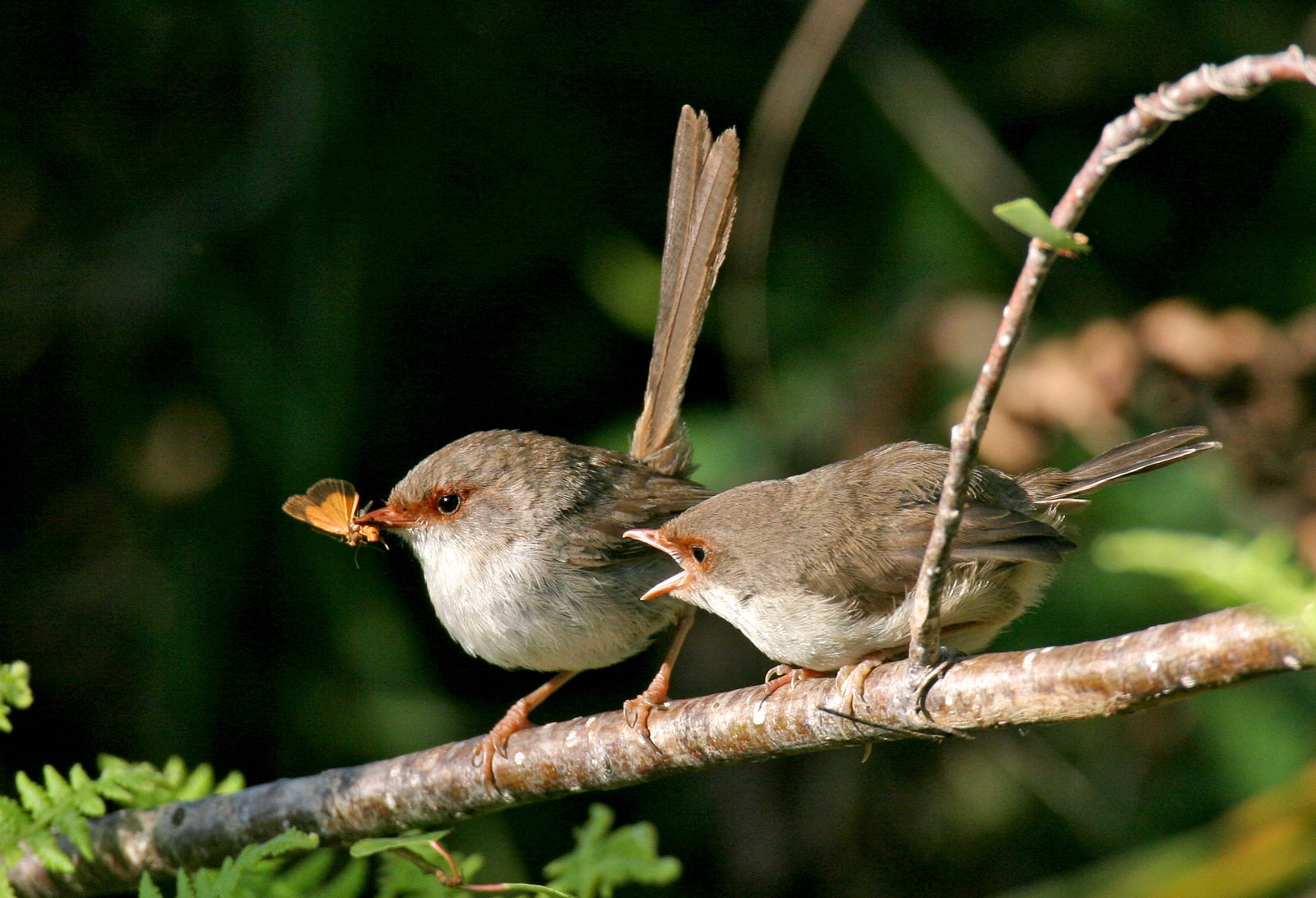
Female with juvenile begging for food, Northern Beaches, Sydney

Breeding occurs from spring through to late summer; the nest is a round or domed structure made of loosely woven grasses and spider webs, with an entrance in one side generally close to the ground, under 1 m (3.3 ft), and in thick vegetation. Two or more broods may be laid in an extended breeding season. A clutch of three or four matte white eggs with reddish-brown splotches and spots, measuring 12 mm × 16 mm (0.47 in × 0.63 in). The eggs are incubated for 14 days, after which they hatch within 24 hours. Newborn chicks are blind, red and featherless, though quickly darken as feathers grow. Their eyes open by day five or six and are fully feathered by day 10. All group members feed and remove fecal sacs for 10–14 days. Fledglings are able to feed themselves by day 40 but remain in the family group as helpers for a year or more before moving to another group or assuming a dominant position in the original group. In this role they feed and care for subsequent broods and repel cuckoos or predators. Superb fairywrens also commonly play host to the brood parasite Horsfield's bronze cuckoo and, less commonly, the shining bronze cuckoo and fan-tailed cuckoo.

=== Diet ===
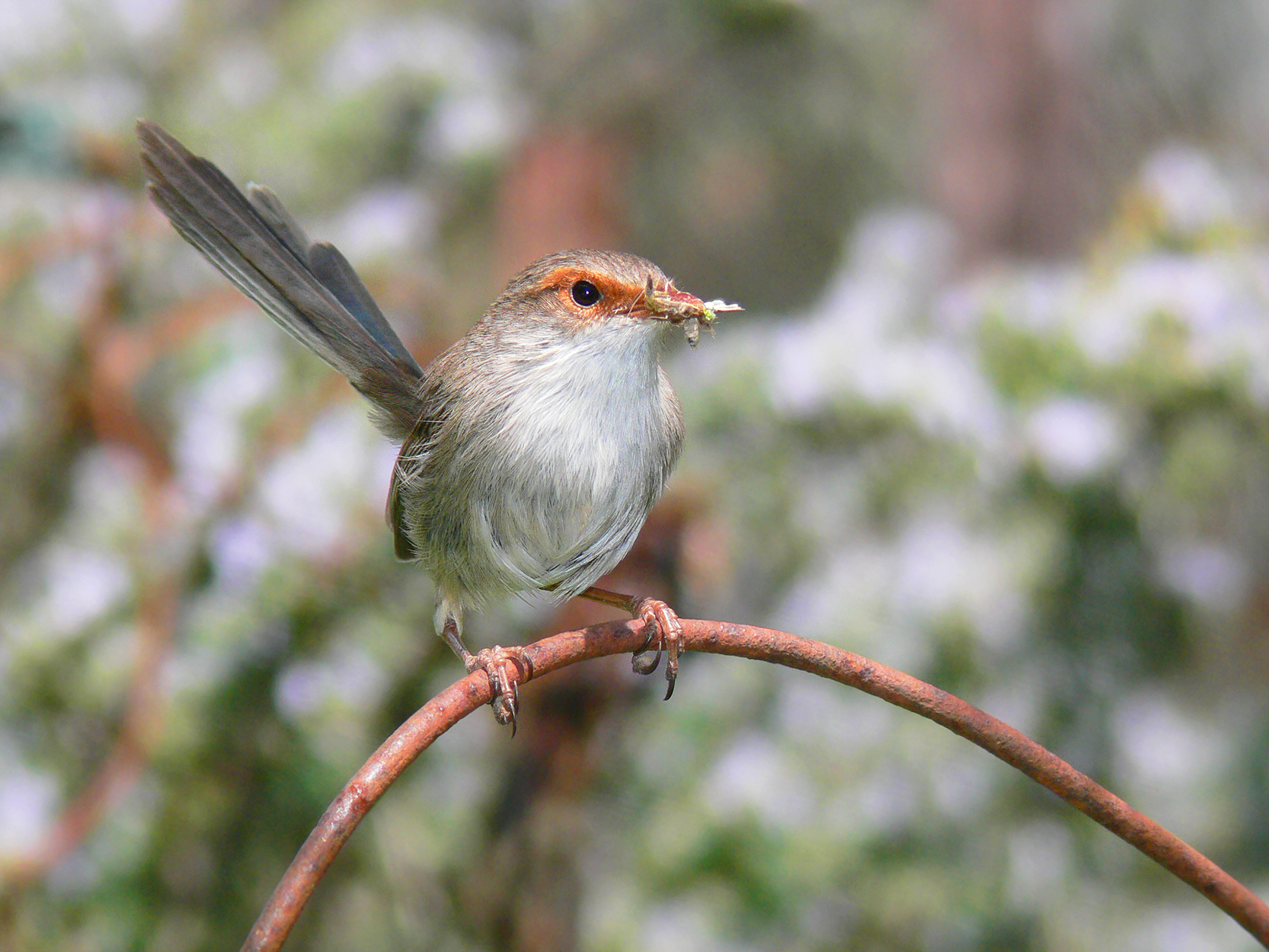
Female, subspecies cyanochlamys, with a grasshopper

Superb fairywrens are predominantly insectivorous. They eat a wide range of small creatures (mostly insects such as ants, grasshoppers, shield bugs, flies, weevils and various larvae) as well as small quantities of seeds, flowers, and fruit. Their foraging, termed 'hop-searching', occurs on the ground or in shrubs that are less than two metres high. Because this foraging practice renders them vulnerable to predators, birds tend to stick fairly close to cover and forage in groups. During winter, when food may be scarce, ants are an important 'last resort' food, constituting a much higher proportion of the diet. Nestlings, in contrast to adult birds, are fed a diet of larger items such as caterpillars and grasshoppers.

== Cultural depictions ==
The superb fairywren breeding male is used as an emblem by the Bird Observation & Conservation Australia. On 12 August 1999, a superb fairywren was mistakenly illustrated for an Australia Post 45c pre-stamped envelope meant to depict a splendid fairywren. Called the blue wren as it was then known, it had previously featured on a 2s.5d. stamp, released in 1964, which was discontinued with the advent of decimal currency.

== Notes ==
=== Cited text ===
- Rowley, Ian; Russell, Eleanor (1997). Bird Families of the World:Fairy-wrens and Grasswrens. Oxford, United Kingdom: Oxford University Press. ISBN 978-0-19-854690-0.
