= Mundaring-Kalamunda Important Bird Area =

Important Bird Area in Western Australia

Coordinates: 31°57′38″S 116°08′23″E

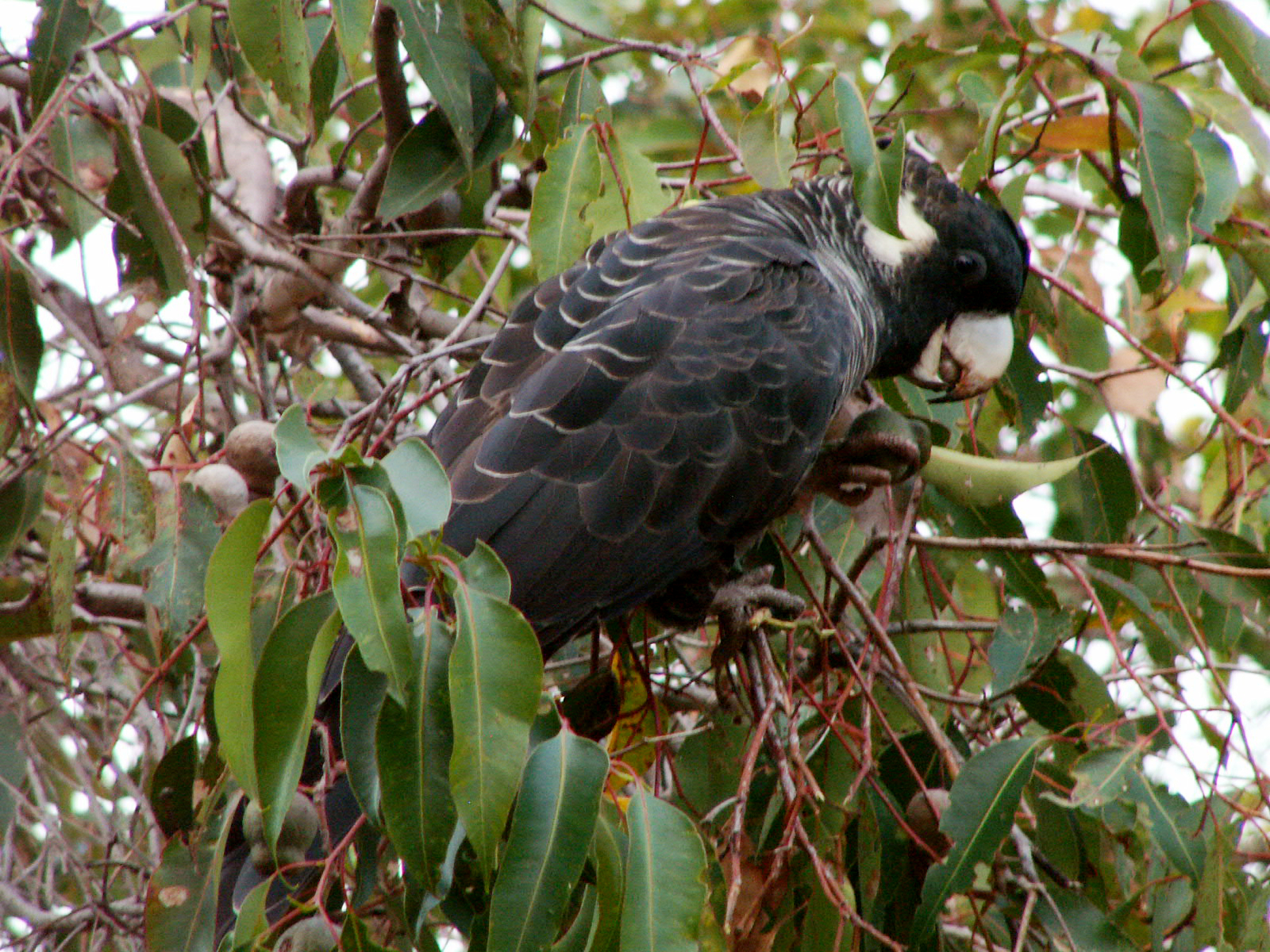
The IBA is an important area for long-billed black cockatoos

The Mundaring-Kalamunda Important Bird Area comprises a fragmented 137 km^{2} of land centred on the towns of Mundaring and Kalamunda in the Darling Scarp region of Western Australia. It lies inside, as well as adjacent to the Beelu National Park.

== Description ==
The boundaries of the Important Bird Area (IBA) are defined by the presence of blocks of native vegetation greater than 1 ha within a 6 km foraging radius of two prominent, non-breeding season, roost sites for long-billed black cockatoos.

== Birds ==
The site has been identified by BirdLife International as an IBA because it supports about 800 long-billed black cockatoos, and up to 200 short-billed black cockatoos, in the non-breeding season. It also supports important populations of red-capped parrots, western rosellas, red-winged fairywrens, western spinebills, western thornbills, western yellow and white-breasted robins, and red-eared firetails. Rufous treecreepers and the forest redtail subspecies of red-tailed black-cockatoo (Calyptorhynchus banksii naso) have been regularly recorded.
