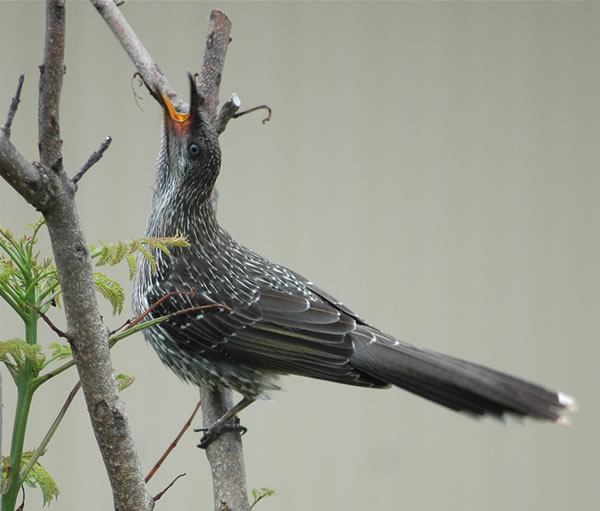
- Little wattlebird (Anthochaera chrysoptera, Meliphagidae)

Scientific classification
- Kingdom: Animalia
- Phylum: Chordata
- Class: Aves
- Order: Passeriformes
- Suborder: Passeri
- Infraorder: Meliphagides
- Superfamily: Meliphagoidea

Families
- Acanthizidae; Dasyornithidae; Meliphagidae; Maluridae; Pardalotidae (but see text) and see text

= Meliphagoidea =

Superfamily of birds

Meliphagoidea is a superfamily of passerine birds. They contain a vast diversity of small to mid-sized songbirds widespread in the Austropacific region. The Australian Continent has the largest richness in genera and species.

== Systematics ==
This group was proposed based on the phenetic DNA-DNA hybridization studies of Charles Sibley et al.. A more modern definition of a monophyletic Meliphagoidea based on cladistic analysis was made by ornithologists at the American Museum of Natural History.

=== Families ===
- Family Maluridae: fairy-wrens, emu-wrens and grasswrens (33 species)
- Family Dasyornithidae: bristlebirds. Formerly in Acanthizidae (3 species)
- Family Acanthizidae: scrubwrens, thornbills and gerygones (66 species)
- Family Pardalotidae: pardalotes (but see below) (4 species)
- Family Meliphagidae: honeyeaters (195 species)

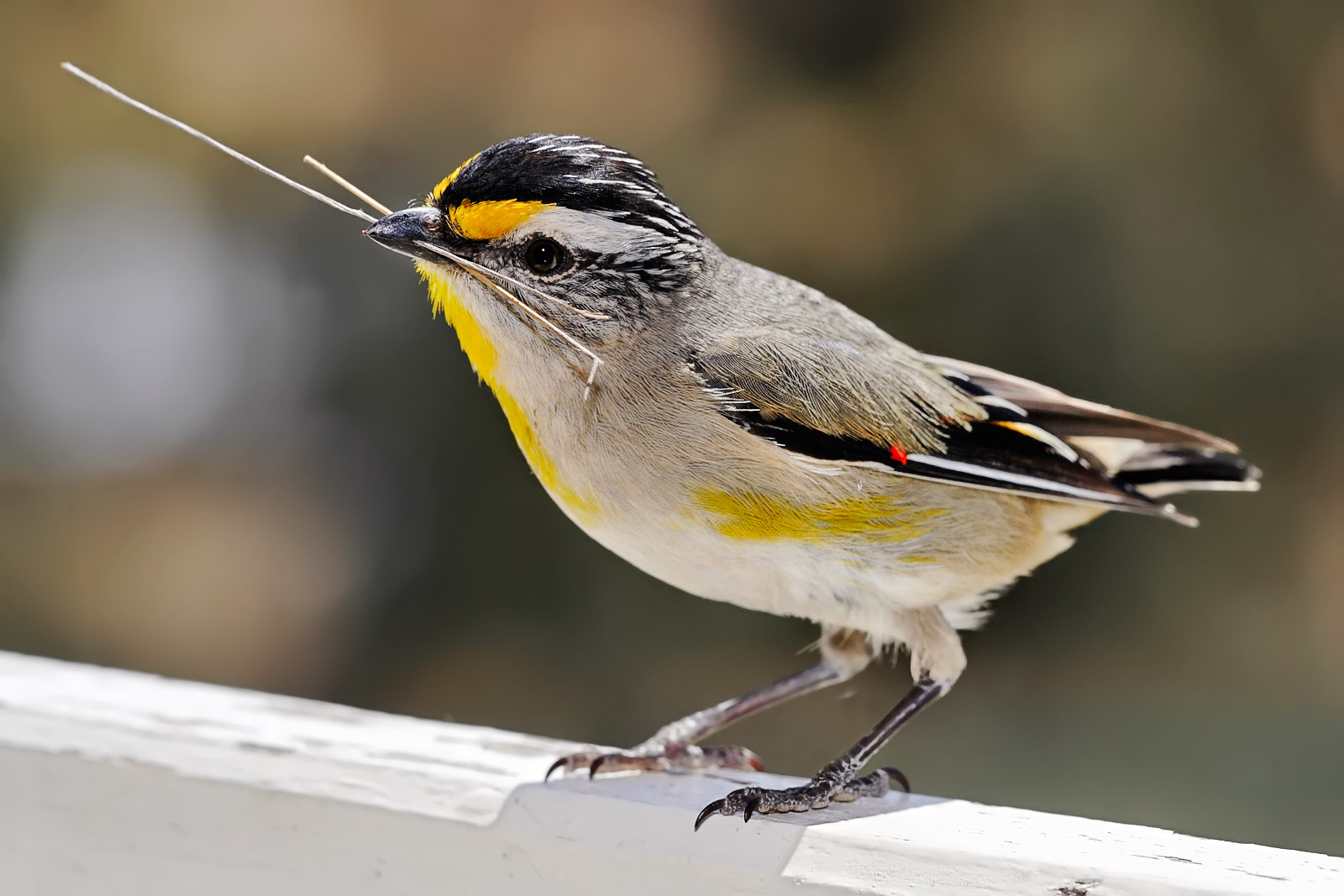
Eastern striated pardalote, Pardalotus striatus ornatus. Their molecular and morphological plesiomorphy has long misled researchers about the pardalotes' affiliations.

The Sibley-Ahlquist taxonomy controversially redefines the families Acanthizidae (thornbills) and Dasyornithidae (bristlebirds) as subfamilies within the larger family Pardalotidae (pardalotes). However, later work indicated that the Pardalotidae are more closely related to the Meliphagidae (honeyeaters) and could be considered a subfamily within them. The Acanthizidae have also been traditionally considered aberrant honeyeaters, and could also be considered a subfamily of Meliphagidae; however, they seem to be very ancient members of Meliphagoidea and if the pardalotes are separated as a distinct family apart from Meliphagidae, the thornbills might be split off too. But some ornithologists maintain that separating the thornbills and pardalotes into separate families would mean creating two monotypic families with a mere six species in total, and so keeping the thornbills within the Meliphagidae and possibly merging the pardalotes therein as well seems to be a more sensible course of action.

The Sibley-Ahlquist taxonomy also placed the Petroicidae (Australasian "robins") in the Meliphagoidea. This is now no longer favoured; as more recent work show that they form a distinct lineage of uncertain relationships; all that can be said at present with reasonable certainty is that the Petroicidae are neither Passerida ("advanced" songbirds) nor a very ancient songbird group.

The following cladogram is based on a large molecular phylogenetic study of the passerines by Carl Oliveros and collaborators that was published in 2019.

- Meliphagoidea
  - Maluridae (Australasian wrens)
  - - Dasyornithidae (bristlebirds)
    - - Meliphagidae (honeyeaters)
      - - Acanthizidae (Australasian warblers)
        - Pardalotidae (pardalotes)
