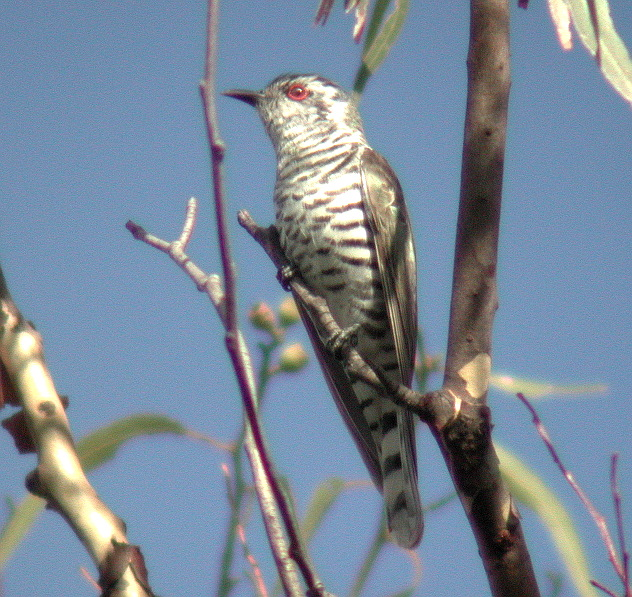

Conservation status
- Least Concern (IUCN 3.1)

Scientific classification
- Kingdom: Animalia
- Phylum: Chordata
- Class: Aves
- Order: Cuculiformes
- Family: Cuculidae
- Genus: Chalcites
- Species: C. minutillus

Binomial name
- Chalcites minutillus (Gould, 1859)

= Little bronze cuckoo =

Species of bird

The little bronze cuckoo (Chalcites minutillus) is a species of cuckoo in the family Cuculidae. It was formerly placed in the genus Chrysococcyx. It is a common brood parasite of birds from the genus Geryone. This cuckoo is found in Southeast Asia, New Guinea and some parts of Australia, where its natural habitat is subtropical or tropical moist lowland forest. It is the world's smallest cuckoo. The pied bronze cuckoo was formerly considered to be a subspecies. Other common names for the little bronze cuckoo include the red-eyed bronze cuckoo and the Malay green cuckoo. It has 11 subspecies which are generally recognized.

== Description ==
As the world's smallest cuckoo, the little bronze cuckoo measures 15-16 centimeters (5.9-6.3 in) in length and weighs 14.5-17.0 grams (0.51-0.60 oz). The females are slightly larger than the males. The generation length of the Little Bronze Cuckoo is approximately three years.

The little bronze cuckoo is characterized by its bronze-green upperparts, white underparts with dark barring, and a distinctive white spot behind the eye. It has a slender body and a long tail, allowing it to maneuver swiftly through dense vegetation. In flight, it is described as being direct with subtle undulation. Males of this species can most easily be distinguished from females by a red orbital ring. Juveniles are much less bright and may lack mottling on their flanks.

The little bronze cuckoo's appearance resembles the shining bronze cuckoo, Horsfield's bronze cuckoo, the rufous-throated bronze cuckoo, the pied bronze cuckoo, the violet cuckoo, the banded bay cuckoo and juvenile brush cuckoos.

== Distribution and habitat ==
The little bronze cuckoo's range covers Southeast Asia, New Guinea and northern and eastern Australia.

In terms of habitat, the little bronze cuckoo prefers open woodlands, forest edges, and scrubby areas with dense vegetation. It is also known to live near humans in places such as villages and gardens. The habitats populated by the little bronze cuckoo depends on where they are located geographically:

- Thai-Malay Peninsula: forest edges, mangrove lowlands, scrub and gardens.
- Java: mangroves, monsoon vine forests
- Australia: Densely vegetated areas, mangroves, monsoon forest edges, near wetlands, forests
- South-East Queensland and North-East New South Wales: Forest edges and forest
- New Guinea: Forests and woodlands including eucalyptus, sclerophyll and paperbarks.

Members of this species are often located below 500m of elevation but there are some exceptions across its range, and it has been known to occur at up to 2000 meters of elevation.

== Evolutionary history ==
A big driver of evolution in parasitic cuckoo species is the hosts available to them. Cuckoo species with many potential hosts are more likely to split off into multiple species that lay their eggs in the nests of specific hosts. The little bronze cuckoo is a good example of this because it is the brood parasitic cuckoo with the most subspecies. In fact, Gerygones, their main hosts, also reflect an unusually high level of speciation which could signal an evolutionary arms race against their brood parasites. The little bronze cuckoo and Geryones have entangled evolutionary histories.

== Taxonomy ==
Synonyms for the little bronze cuckoo, Chalcites minutillus (Gould, 1857), include Chrysococcyx minutillus, Chrysococcyx rufomerus and Chrysococcyx russatus. Genetic analyses have shown that it is most closely related to the white-eared bronze cuckoo (Chrysococcyx meyerii).

In Australia, the subspecies C. m. russatus is genetically very similar to C. minutillus however, the genes evaluated do show some overall separation dividing C. m. russatus from the rest of its species. Specimens that are somewhere in between both subspecies have been discovered, suggesting hybridization does occur. Additionally, there are also reports of C. m. russatus and C. minutillus which describe both group laying eggs in the nests of different hosts and that their chicks look different from each other to better mimic the specific host chicks. The conflicting evidence suggests both groups may be diverging into distinct species but have not yet reached this point. There is also no guarantee the situation is the same for populations elsewhere, such as in New Guinea. C. m russatus is also sometimes considered to be a synonym of C. m poecilurus but remains recognized as a distinct subspecies by the International Ornithologists' Union.

The subspecies C. m salavdorii is occasionally placed with the species C. crassirostris but morphologically more closely resembles the little bronze cuckoo.

The pied bronze cuckoo (Chalcites crassirostris) was formerly considered as a subspecies but differs from C. minutillus in coloration and vocalizations.

There may also be an undescribed subspecies from the island of Timor.

List of the eleven subspecies recognized by the International Ornithologists' Union:

- C. m. peninsularis (Parker, SA, 1981) – southern Thailand and the Malay Peninsula
- C. m. albifrons Junge, 1938 – Sumatra and western Java
- C. m. aheneus Junge, 1938 – Borneo and the southern Philippines
- C. m. jungei Stresemann, 1938 – Sulawesi, Flores and Madu Island
- C. m. rufomerus (Hartert, 1900) (green-cheeked bronze cuckoo) – Lesser Sunda Islands
- C. m. salvadorii Hartert & Stresemann, 1925 – Babar Islands
- C. m. misoriensis (Salvadori, 1876) – Biak (Schouten Islands)
- C. m. poecilurus (G.R.Gray, 1862) – coastal New Guinea and northern Queensland
- C. m. minutillus (Gould, 1859) – northern Australia
- C. m. barnardi (Mathews, 1912) – eastern Australia
- C. m. russatus (Gould, 1868) – (Gould's bronze cuckoo) - formerly considered by some authorities as a separate species. Found in north-eastern Australia, New Guinea

== Behaviour ==
=== Diet ===
The little bronze cuckoo is insectivorous and feeds on ants, bees, sawflies, wasps, ladybugs, true bugs as well as butterflies and their caterpillars. They have been observed catching insects mid-flight both from within vegetation and from the forest floor. This species often hunts alone but has also been seen hunting in groups with as many as 5 birds participating.

=== Vocalizations ===
The little bronze cuckoo has territorial vocalizations that are often called from an unobstructed vantage point. These calls consist of 3-5 repeating notes that lower in pitch towards the end. There are some variants: the repeated notes can sound like "rhew", "eug" or be a screeching trill. The calls of individuals in Wallacea have not been described. There are also more variants of these calls specific to subspecies or varying by geographic region.

Superb fairywrens, common hosts of the little bronze cuckoo, will call to their eggs before they hatch to teach them vocalizations that are used to separate them from brood parasites post-hatching. Cuckoo nestlings are not able to replicate the password calls as well as their nestmates, consequently the host can identify and reject them.

=== Breeding ===
The little bronze cuckoo is a polygamist species, which is unusual among birds. One explanation for the behavior is that members of this species do not raise their young and they have dense populations so finding multiple mates is not an issue. The little bronze cuckoo also lays its eggs within a large time window, anytime between the morning and afternoon. This is thought to make it harder for the host to anticipate the visit of a cuckoo to guard their nest against. Male cuckoos also occupy a territory during the breeding season to call for females. Once they find a female, the courtship ritual of male cuckoos includes feeding her.

Geryone dorsalis, a common host for the little bronze cuckoo, is known to dive-bomb adult little bronze cuckoos.

==== Brood parasitism ====
As a brood parasite, the little bronze cuckoo lays its eggs in nests constructed and tended to by other bird species. Their main hosts are birds from genus Geryone, but they can also parasitize multiple species of small passerines. Geryone species are ideal hosts for the little bronze cuckoo because the hatchlings of both species resemble each other, and the hosts construct dark nesting cavities which hide the cuckoo eggs. The host species available are not consistent across the little bronze cuckoo's range and they have a long list of potential hosts including nine Geryone species and hosts from other genera.

When the little bronze cuckoo lays its eggs in a host's nest, it often throws out an egg already occupying the nest. It also occasionally lays eggs in a nest before the host does. While hosts do not throw out cuckoo eggs, Geryone magnirostris and Geryone levigaster have been documented rejecting little bronze cuckoo hatchlings.

==== Cryptic eggs ====
Unlike some species of cuckoo who have evolved eggs that mimic their host's, the little bronze cuckoo has dark green or brown eggs which do not look like host eggs and instead blend in with the nesting material. These cryptic eggs are not meant to protect unhatched cuckoos from their hosts, rather they prevent other cuckoo species from throwing them out of the nest. Because 1 in 3 parasitized host nests will be parasitized by a second cuckoo, unconcealed eggs are at risk of being discovered and removed.

== Migration ==
There remains some uncertainty on the issue of migration for the little bronze cuckoo. Some authors report that this species migrates to New Guinea and Wallacea, while others say there is no credible evidence that they migrate at all. In Australia the little bronze cuckoo has been recorded travelling through the Torres Strait and for this reason is reported to occasionally migrate. The subspecies C. m minutillus and C. m barnardi, may be partial migrants. C. m russatus, C. m crassirostris and C. m poecilurus have also been names in more ambiguous examples of possible migration. The difficulties with finding evidence to resolve this issue are made worse by the morphological similarities between subspecies.

== Conservation ==
The IUCN places the little bronze cuckoo at least concern worldwide. This species is often reported to be common, with some regional exceptions. The population also does not seem to be decreasing. Despite the population size remaining unknown, it is believed to be sizeable. However, there are some isolated declines, for example at Holmes Jungle the population is reported to have dropped by half. They are also rare on Borneo and Java.
