= Emerald cuckoo =

Emerald cuckoo refers to either of two cuckoo species in genus Chrysococcyx.

- African emerald cuckoo (Chrysococcyx cupreus)
- Asian emerald cuckoo (Chrysococcyx maculatus)
