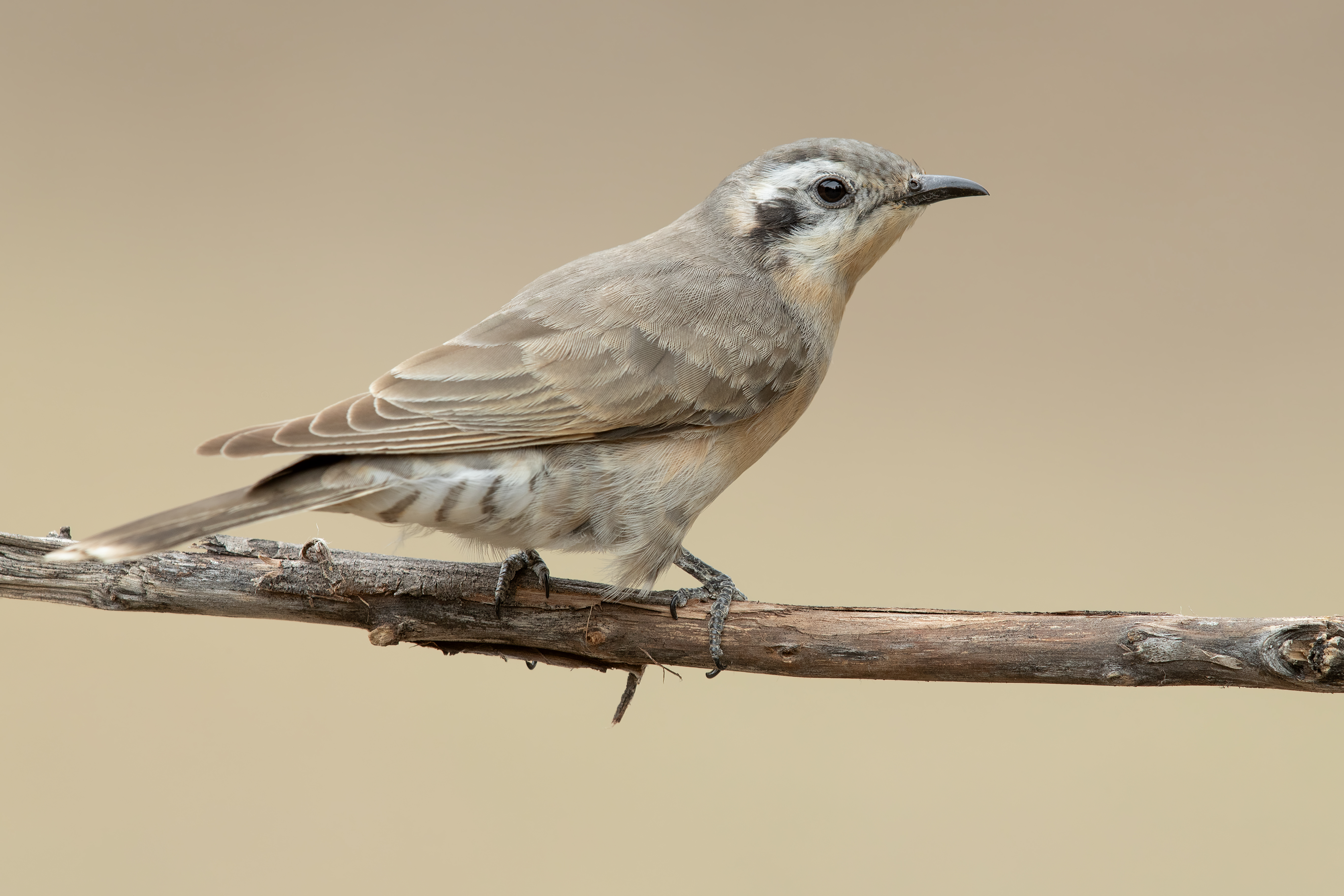

Conservation status
- Least Concern (IUCN 3.1)

Scientific classification
- Kingdom: Animalia
- Phylum: Chordata
- Class: Aves
- Order: Cuculiformes
- Family: Cuculidae
- Genus: Chalcites
- Species: C. osculans

Binomial name
- Chalcites osculans Gould, 1847

Synonyms
- Chalcites osculans

= Black-eared cuckoo =

Species of bird

The black-eared cuckoo (Chalcites osculans) is a species of cuckoo in the family Cuculidae. Found across Australia, it migrates to eastern Indonesia and southern New Guinea. They are usually observed by themselves or in a pair as they don't raise their own young, rather they leave eggs in another species nest to be raised by host. This species was formerly placed in the genus Chrysococcyx.

== Description ==
Adult weight on average 30 grams (1.1 oz) and are 19 to 20 cm (7.5 to 7.9 in) long, with dull greyish-brown back with distinctive black eye-stripe from the bill to the neck. Rump is pale white and breasts area is pale salmon in colour. Feet and legs are black, eyes are brown, bill is black tail is grey/brown on top, with white tips, while underneath the tail is cream with brownish bars. What distinguishes it from other small sized cuckoo species in Australia is that it doesn't have a metallic coloured feathers on its back. Juveniles are duller in colour with a more brown eye-stripe.

=== Vocalization ===
Chicks will give a chirp, while in adults a descending feeeuw or pee-o-weer call in a lower mournful tone than the Horsfield's bronze cuckoo, which may be a singular or repeated. During courtship a call of pee-o-wit may be also heard. Males are often are observed calling from high branches but can still be found on lower branches

== Distribution and habitat ==
Common in most areas of Australia except wet coastal forested areas, basically inland side of great dividing range in Victoria, New South Wales and Queensland. Vagrants found in Tasmania. Breeds in southern Australia below 23rd parallel south some birds will stay in southern Australia during winter, while many will migrate to Northern Australia and further north into Indonesia and PNG,

It is found in dry open forests, scrublands, mallee, mulga, lignum, saltbush and riverside thickets. They prefers to fly direct between low trees and shrubs, rather than large trees, and are rare in subhumid areas.

== Behaviour and ecology ==
=== Food and feeding ===
They feed on beetles, diptera, hemiptera, insects, sandflies and have been observed eating hairy caterpillars. Majority of food is obtained on the ground but they have been observed foraging in trees and shrubs.

=== Breeding ===
Breeding season varies depending on rain and location in Australia, generally the drier inland starts earlier in the year. In the west breeding starts earlier in the year around June, while in the east it can be later in August, with season finishing in October in the west and December in the east. During courtship, females and males will call to each other, with females starting loud and then quieting down as males approach, males will feed females during courtship.

As a brood parasitic species, they lay one dark brown egg in enclosed or domed shaped nests of passerine bird species. In particular studies have shown it prefers to target speckled warbler and redthroat birds. Eggs have also been found in nests of fieldwrens, thornbills, scrubwrens and heathwrens

Often a female black-eared cuckoo will remove one host eggs when replacing it with its own. These eggs are coloured and sized to mimic the hosts eggs, often the eggs are so well mimicked, that they can only be identified apart by rubbing the egg to remove the brown pigmentation. Therefore, hatchings are raised by host species, with speckled warblers having been observed feeding black-eared cuckoo chicks. After at least 18-day, the chick will leave its hosts nest.
