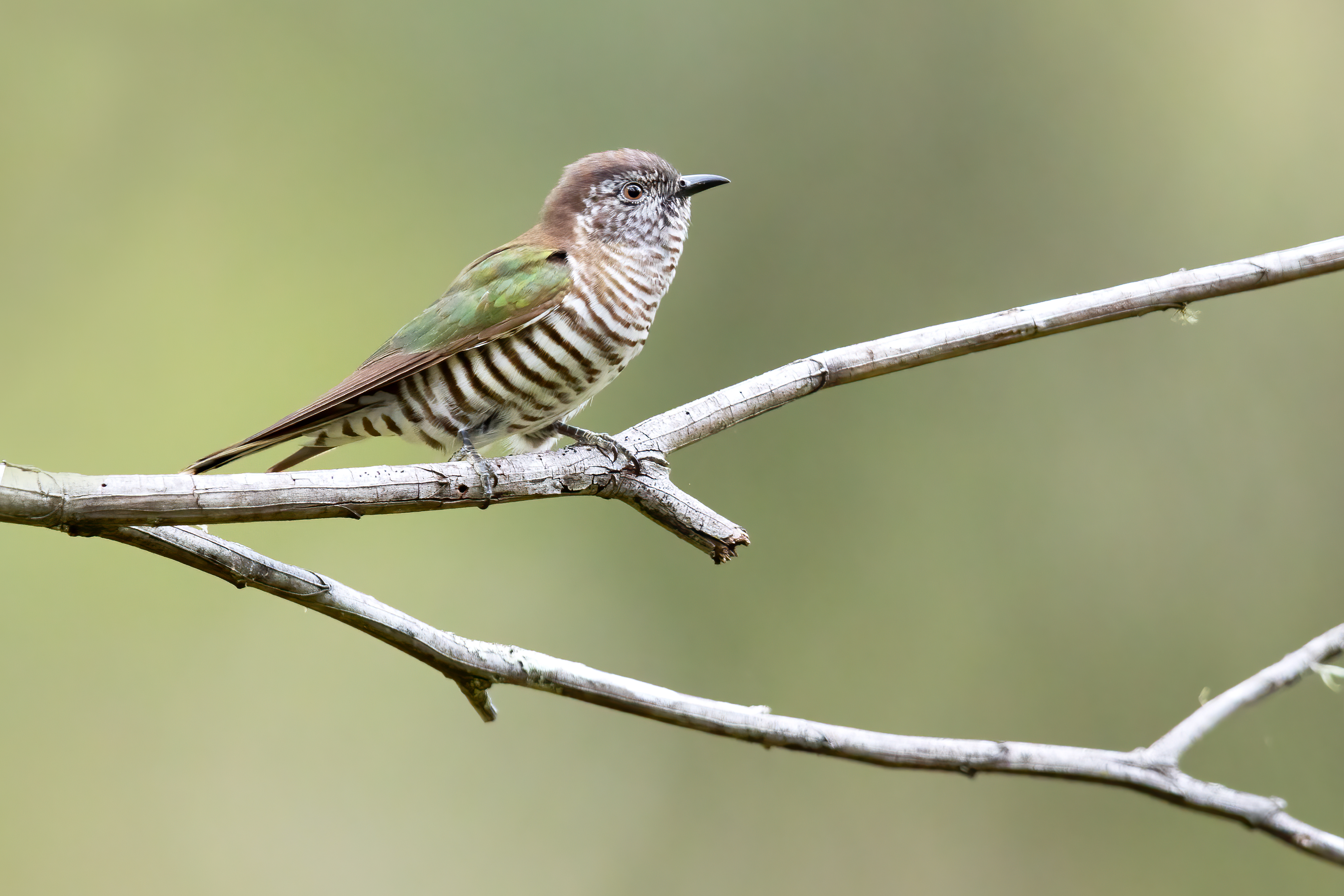
- In NSW, Australia

Conservation status
- Least Concern (IUCN 3.1)

Scientific classification
- Kingdom: Animalia
- Phylum: Chordata
- Class: Aves
- Order: Cuculiformes
- Family: Cuculidae
- Genus: Chalcites
- Species: C. lucidus

Binomial name
- Chalcites lucidus (Gmelin, 1788)

Synonyms
- Chrysococcyx lucidus (Gmelin, 1788); Cuculus lucidus Gmelin, 1788

= Shining bronze cuckoo =

Species of bird

The shining bronze cuckoo or pīpīwharauroa (Chalcites lucidus) is a species of cuckoo in the family Cuculidae, found in Australia, Indonesia, New Caledonia, New Zealand, Papua New Guinea, Solomon Islands, and Vanuatu. It was formerly placed in the genus Chrysococcyx.

It is a very small cuckoo, being only 13 to 18 cm (5.1 to 7.1 in) in length, and parasitises chiefly dome-shaped nests of various Gerygone species, having a range that largely corresponds with the distribution of that genus. It may also parasitise other Acanthizidae species, and is also the most southerly ranging brood parasitic bird species in the world, extending to at least 46°S in New Zealand.

== Description ==
Hard to spot and easier to hear, the shining bronze cuckoo is 13–18 cm (5.1–7.1 in) in overall length, has a wingspan of 25–32 cm (9.8–12.6 in) and weighs around 25 g (0.88 oz). It is slightly larger than Horsfield's bronze cuckoo (Chalcites basalis). It has metallic golden or coppery green upperparts and white cheeks and underparts barred with dark green. The female is similar with a more purplish sheen to the crown and nape and bronzer-tinged barring on the belly. The bill is black and the feet are black with yellow undersides.

== Taxonomy ==
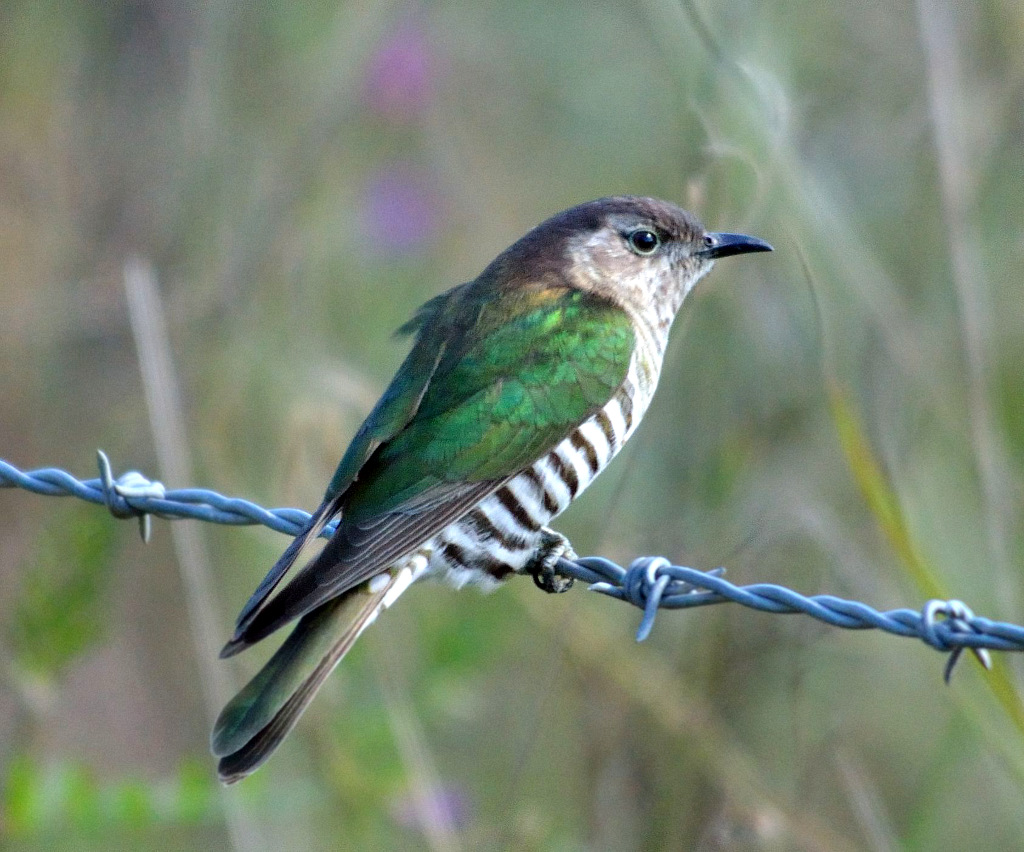
In Brisbane

The shining bronze cuckoo was formally described in 1788 by the German naturalist Johann Friedrich Gmelin in his revised and expanded edition of Carl Linnaeus's Systema Naturae. He placed it with all the other cuckoos in the genus Cuculus and coined the binomial name Cuculus lucidus. Gmelin based his description on the Shining cuckoo from New Zealand that had been described and illustrated in 1782 by the English ornithologist John Latham in his A General Synopsis of Birds. Latham had in turn based his account on a drawing obtained from Joseph Banks. The shining bronze cuckoo is now placed together with 7 other species in the genus Chalcites that was introduced in 1830 by the French naturalist René Lesson. The genus name combines the Ancient Greek χρυσος khrusos meaning "gold" with κοκκυξ kokkux "cuckoo". The specific epithet lucidus is from Latin and means "clear" or "bright".

In 1801 Latham described the "Glossy cuckoo" as Cuculus plagosus from New South Wales, and the two were classified as separate species for many years. However Latham's Cuculus plagosus is now considered as a subspecies of the shining bronze cuckoo. In New Zealand it is usually known as the shining cuckoo, or by its Māori name pīpīwharauroa.

Formerly some authorities placed the shining bronze cuckoo together with a group of Afro-Asian species in the genus Chrysococcyx.

Four subspecies are recognised:

- C. l. harterti Mayr, 1932 – resident on Rennell and Bellona (south Solomon Islands)
- C. l. layardi Mathews, 1912 – resident on Temotu (=Santa Cruz Islands, southeast Solomon Islands), Vanuatu including Banks Islands and New Caledonia including Loyalty Islands
- C. l. plagosus (Latham, 1801) – breeds southwest Western Australia, Cape York Peninsula, northeast Queensland to southeast South Australia and Tasmania (southwest, northeast Australia and Tasmania): winters Lesser Sunda Islands, New Guinea and Bismarck Archipelago
- C. l. lucidus (Gmelin, JF, 1788) – breeds North, South, Stewart Island, satellites and Chatham Islands (east of South Island; New Zealand): winters to east Australia, New Guinea, D'Entrecasteaux Archipelago (east of southeast New Guinea), Bismarck Archipelago including Admiralty Islands and Solomon Islands

== Distribution and habitat ==
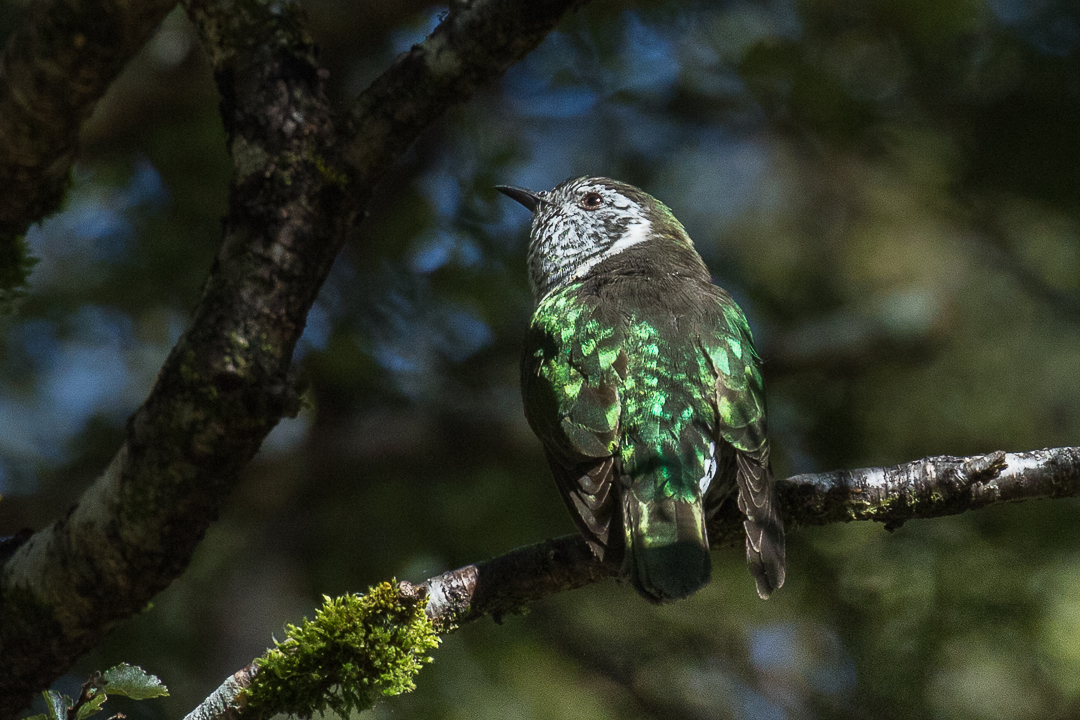
in New Zealand

The shining bronze cuckoo is a summer visitor to Eastern Australia from the Cape York Peninsula in Queensland to South Australia's Eyre Peninsula and Kangaroo Island and Tasmania, as well as Western Australia from Carnarvon in the north to the southwest and east to Esperance. These winter in the Lessa Sunda Islands and New Guinea. New Zealand populations winter in the Solomon Islands and arrive in New Zealand from mid August, though they are not common until October. They spread out to Stewart and Chatham Islands and are found to an altitude of 4,000 ft (1,220 m). The island races, layardi in New Caledonia, Vanuatu and some of the islands of the Solomon Islands, and harterti of Rennell and Bellona Islands in the Solomons, are non-migratory.

== Behaviour and ecology ==
=== Breeding ===
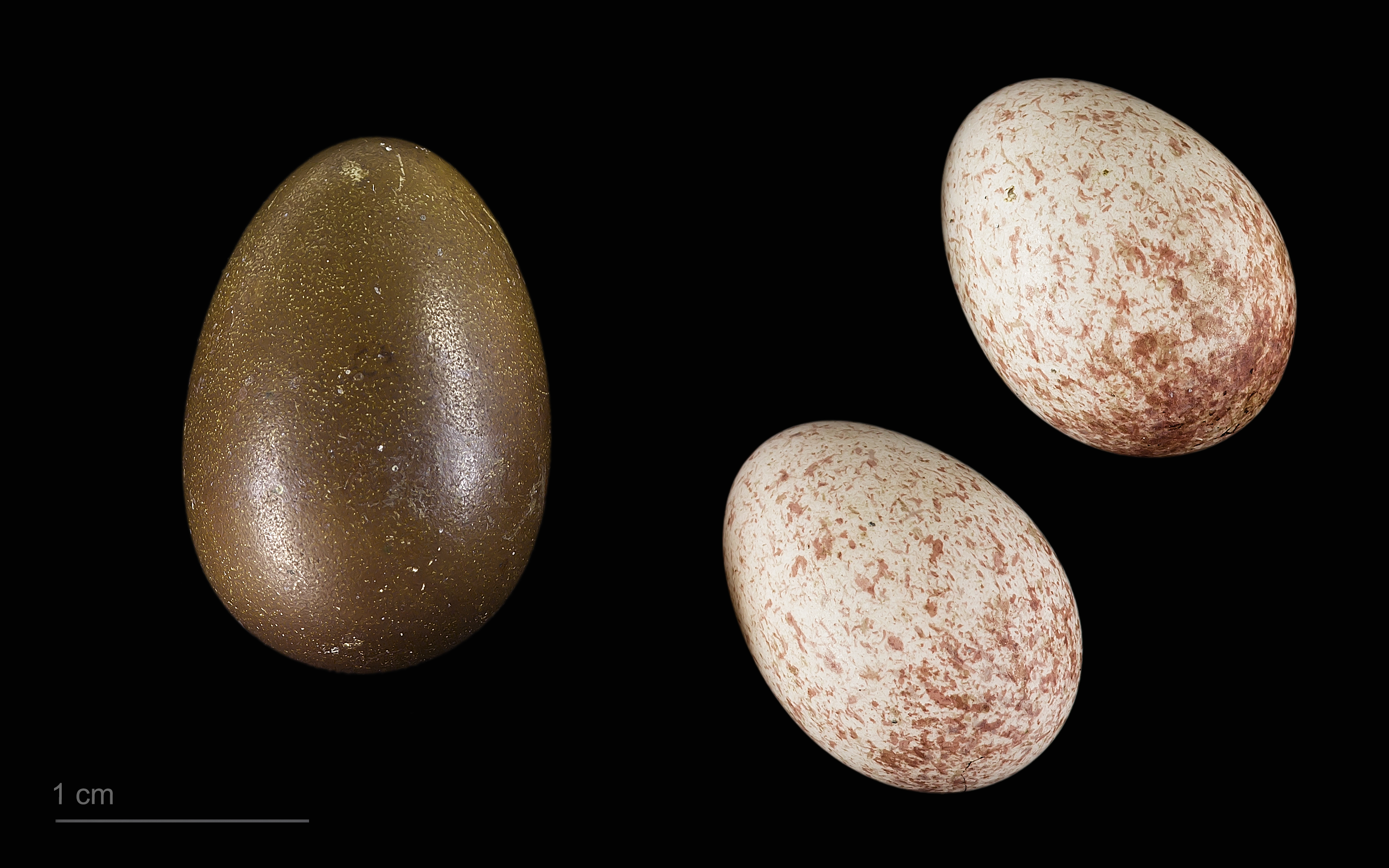
Dark shining bronze cuckoo egg in a clutch from the fan-tailed gerygone

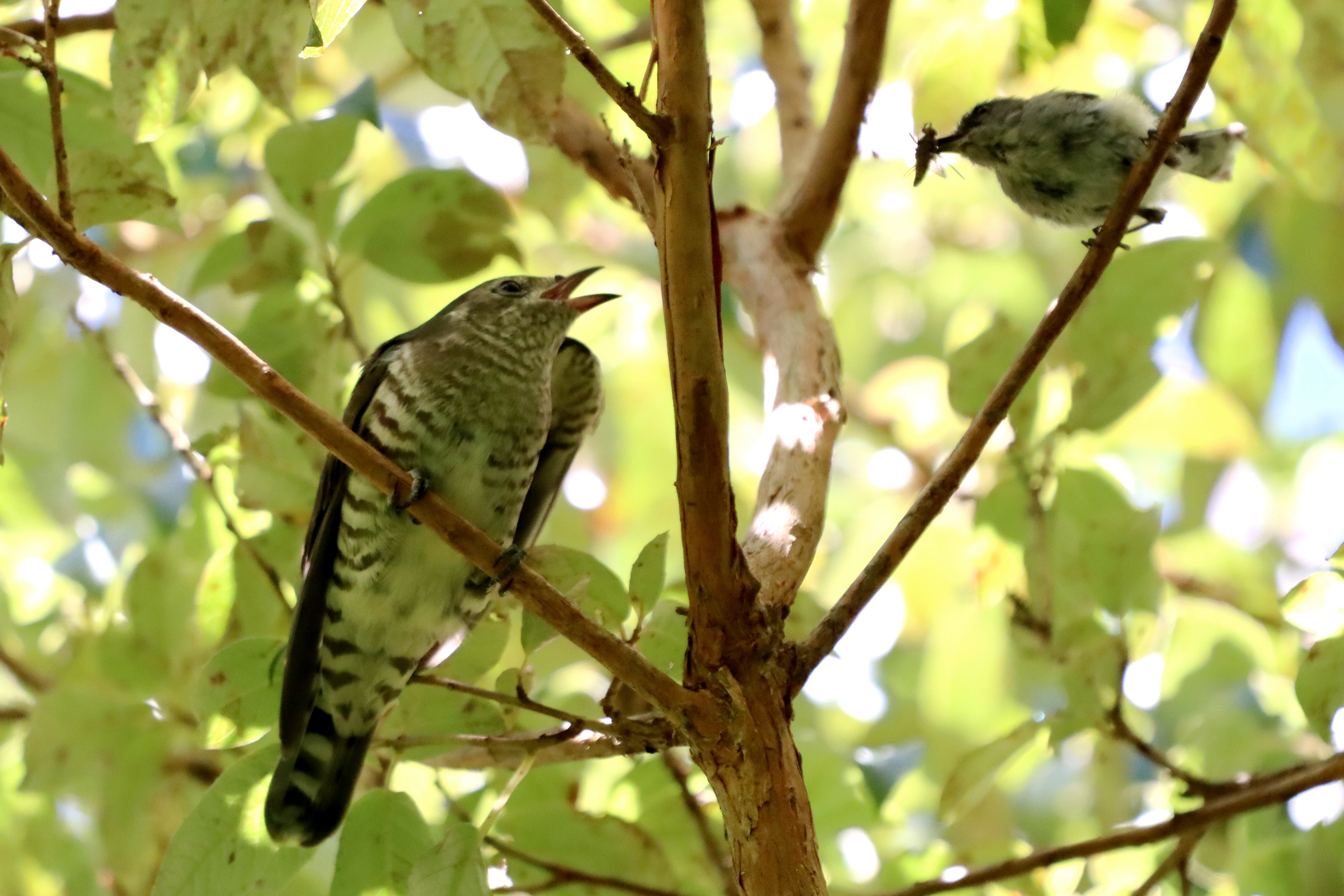
A juvenile shining cuckoo being fed by a grey warbler

A female shining bronze cuckoo lays a single egg in a host nest and removes a host egg. After hatching, the baby cuckoo ejects the host nestlings from the nest.

The grey warbler is a common host species in New Zealand, the shining bronze cuckoos missing the first but parasitising heavily the second broods of the season (55% of nests in a study in Kaikōura). Fieldwork near Kaikōura showed that the dark colour of cuckoo eggs seemed to serve to protect cuckoo eggs from being removed by other cuckoos in grey warbler nests rather than the hosts. A test using model eggs of different tones showed that the hosts did not reject eggs, but that cuckoos removed eggs of brighter colours. The dark matte cuckoo eggs are hard to see in the shadows of a grey warbler nest.

The Chatham Island warbler is a host species in the Chatham Islands. The matte eggs laid are olive brown in Western Australia and various shades of green or greenish white to olive to dark brown elsewhere, and do not resemble the eggs of their host. The dark pigment rubs off easily. The eggs are often dark coloured in thornbill and gerygone nests, whose eggs are likewise domed and dark. This is thought to minimise the risk of ejection by a second female cuckoo visitor to the already parasitised nest, which might overlook a dark egg when laying another egg.

Several other species are occasional hosts. In Victoria in 2005, a pair of chestnut-rumped heathwren was encountered with a juvenile shining bronze cuckoo which imitated the alarm call of a baby heathwren. The introduced house sparrow and song thrush have been recorded as hosts in New Zealand.

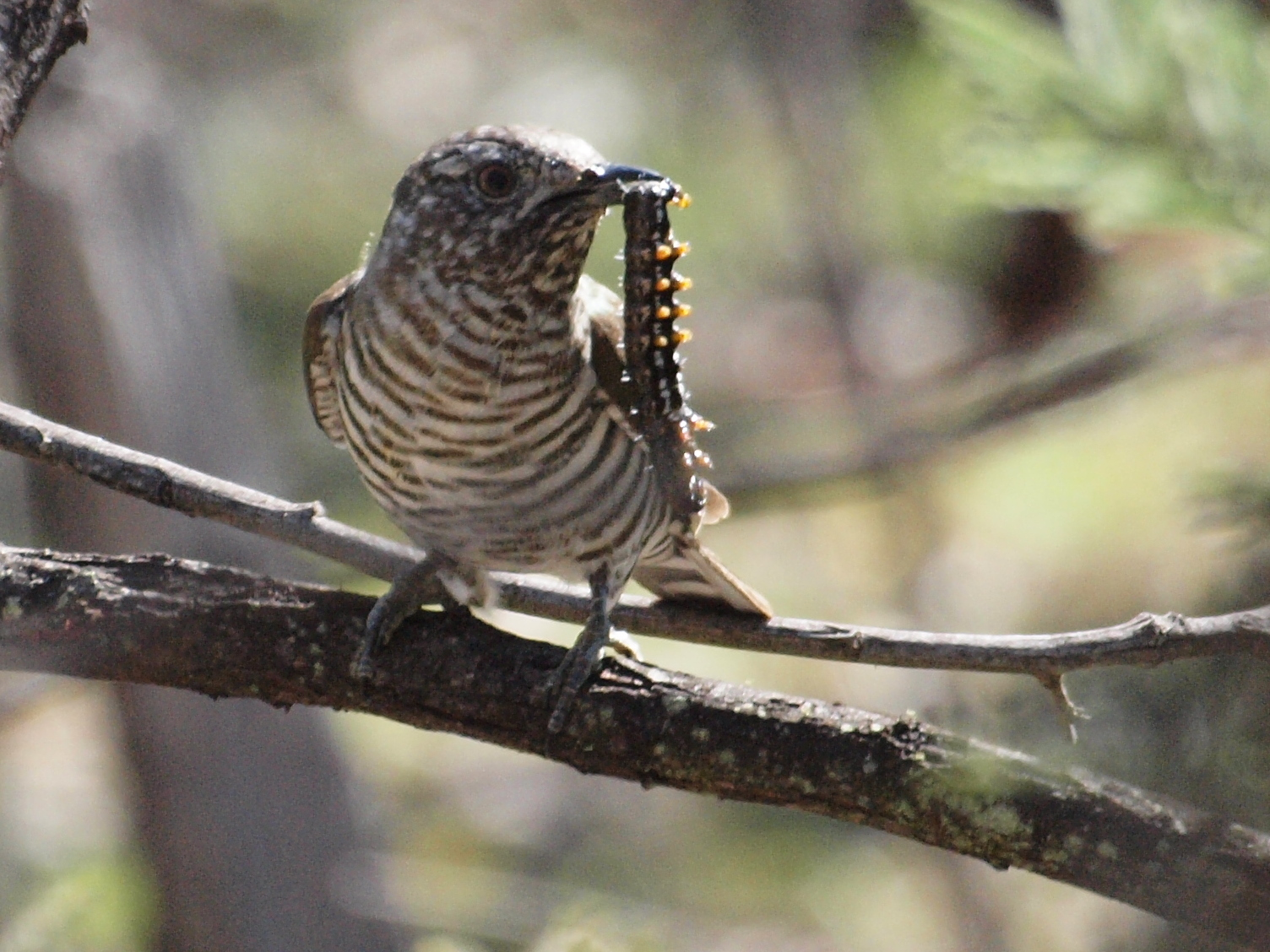
Young shining bronze cuckoo with caterpillar, Mulligans Flat Nature Reserve, Canberra

In New Caledonia, the fan-tailed gerygone (Gerygone flavolateralis) is the sole host of the species.

=== Food and feeding ===
Insectivorous, the shining bronze cuckoo eats insects that are avoided by other birds, such as caterpillars, particularly those of the magpie moth, and beetles, particularly ladybirds. The shining bronze cuckoo's gizzard is lined with a soft thick lining which catches the caterpillar spines; these fall away and are spat out by the bird. The species is also known to eat bird eggs.

== Predators and threats ==
The shining bronze cuckoo falls prey to cats. It has been recorded dying after flying into windows.
