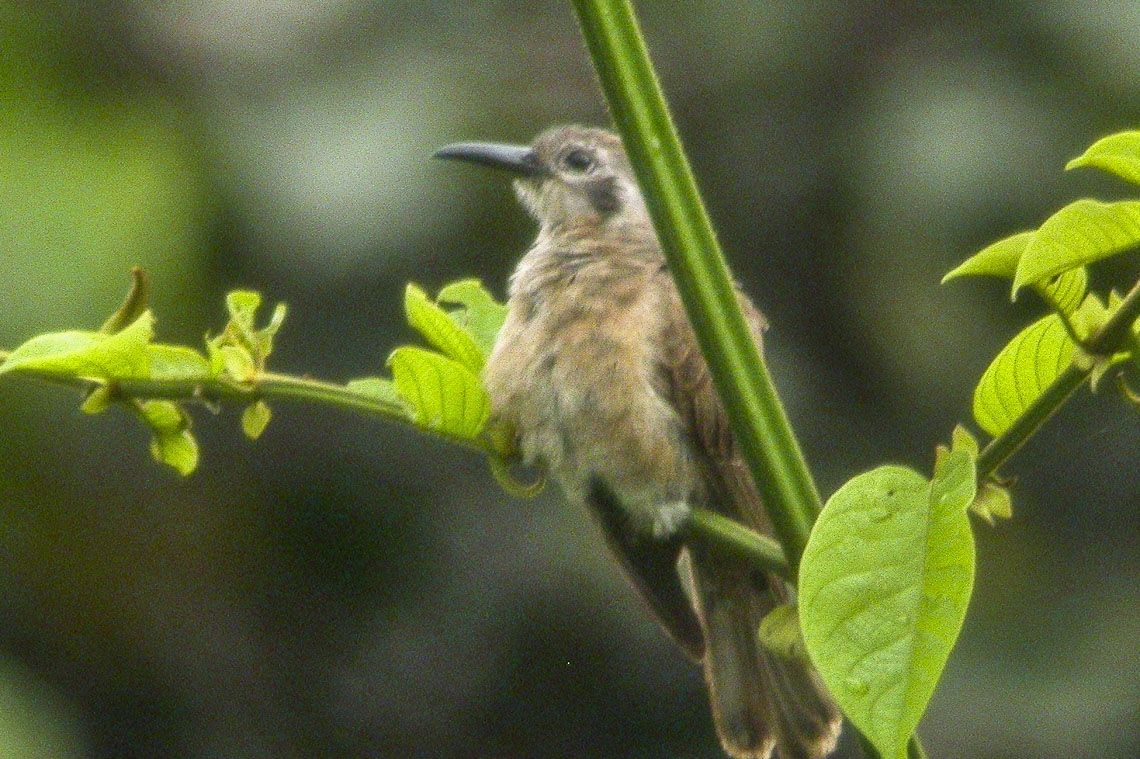
- Female

Conservation status
- Least Concern (IUCN 3.1)

Scientific classification
- Kingdom: Animalia
- Phylum: Chordata
- Class: Aves
- Order: Cuculiformes
- Family: Cuculidae
- Genus: Chalcites
- Species: C. megarhynchus

Binomial name
- Chalcites megarhynchus (Gray, 1858)

Synonyms
- Rhamphomantis megarhynchus

= Long-billed cuckoo =

Species of bird

The long-billed cuckoo (Chalcites megarhynchus) is a species of cuckoo in the family Cuculidae. Found in the Aru Islands and New Guinea, its natural habitats are subtropical or tropical moist lowland forests. This species was formerly placed in the genus Chrysococcyx.

== Description ==
The long-billed cuckoo is a medium-sized cuckoo, measuring 18 cm (7.1 in) in length and weighing approximately 31 g (1.1 oz). Adult males are characterized by dark brown upperparts, a black head, and dull greyish-brown underparts, along with a red eye-ring and iris, and a long, black bill with a drooping tip. Females differ with dark cinnamon upperparts, a dark grey-brown head, and a rufous buff, finely barred breast and belly, transitioning to cinnamon on the lower breast; their iris is dark brown with a narrow whitish outer ring. Juveniles exhibit cinnamon upperparts, a pale grey and brown face, a dark eye-ring, and a dark brown iris.
