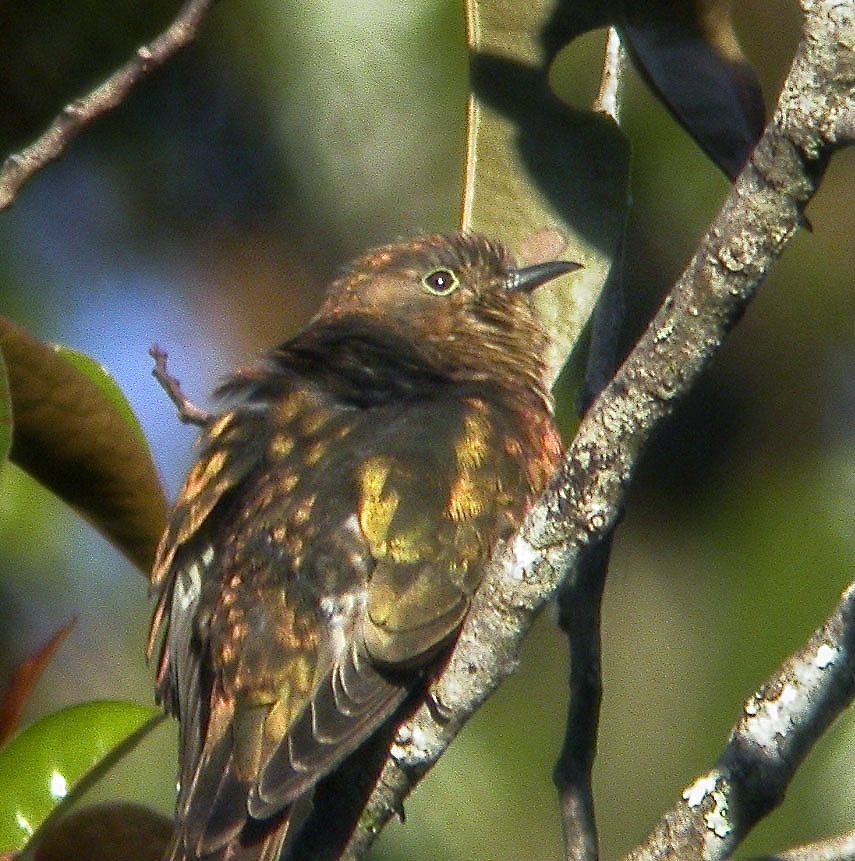

Conservation status
- Least Concern (IUCN 3.1)

Scientific classification
- Kingdom: Animalia
- Phylum: Chordata
- Class: Aves
- Order: Cuculiformes
- Family: Cuculidae
- Genus: Chalcites
- Species: C. ruficollis

Binomial name
- Chalcites ruficollis (Salvadori, 1876)

Synonyms
- Chrysococcyx ruficollis

= Rufous-throated bronze cuckoo =

Species of bird

The rufous-throated bronze cuckoo (Chalcites ruficollis) is a species of cuckoo in the family Cuculidae. It was formerly placed in the genus Chrysococcyx. It is found in the highlands of New Guinea where its natural habitat is tropical moist montane forests.
