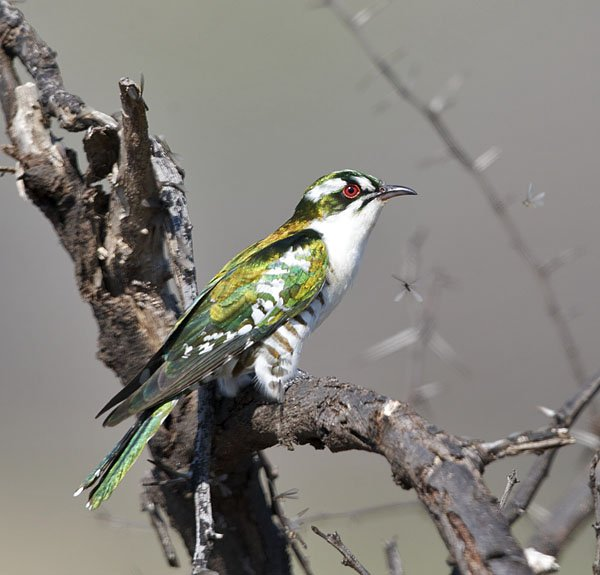

Conservation status
- Least Concern (IUCN 3.1)

Scientific classification
- Kingdom: Animalia
- Phylum: Chordata
- Class: Aves
- Order: Cuculiformes
- Family: Cuculidae
- Genus: Chrysococcyx
- Species: C. caprius

Binomial name
- Chrysococcyx caprius (Boddaert, 1783)

Audio
- Calls recorded in southwestern Kenya

= Diederik cuckoo =

Species of bird

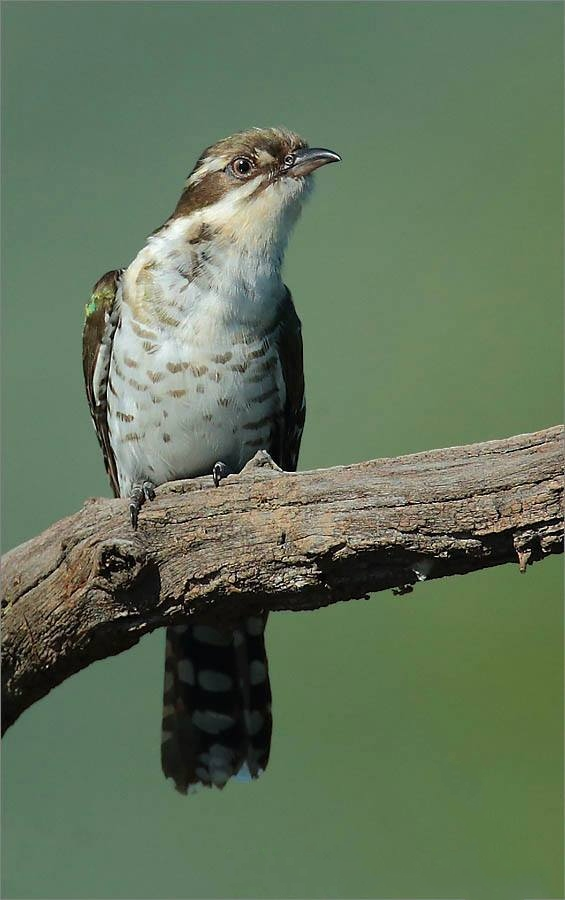
Diederik cuckoo – female

The diederik cuckoo (Chrysococcyx caprius), formerly dideric cuckoo or didric cuckoo, is a member of the cuckoo family of birds, Cuculidae, which also includes the roadrunners and the anis.

== Taxonomy ==
The diederik cuckoo was described by the French polymath Georges-Louis Leclerc, Comte de Buffon in 1780 in his Histoire Naturelle des Oiseaux from a specimen collected in the Cape of Good Hope region of South Africa. The bird was also illustrated in a hand-coloured plate engraved by François-Nicolas Martinet in the Planches Enluminées D'Histoire Naturelle which was produced under the supervision of Edme-Louis Daubenton to accompany Buffon's text. Neither the plate caption nor Buffon's description included a scientific name but in 1783 the Dutch naturalist Pieter Boddaert coined the binomial name Cuculus caprius in his catalogue of the Planches Enluminées. The diederik cuckoo is now placed in the genus Chrysococcyx that was erected by the German zoologist Friedrich Boie in 1826. The species is monotypic.

The generic name Chrysococcyx combines the Ancient Greek khrusos meaning "gold" and kokkux meaning "cuckoo". The specific epithet caprius is from the Latin cupreus meaning "coppery". The common name "diederik" is from Afrikaans "diedrik", an onomatopoeic rendition of the bird's call.

== Description ==
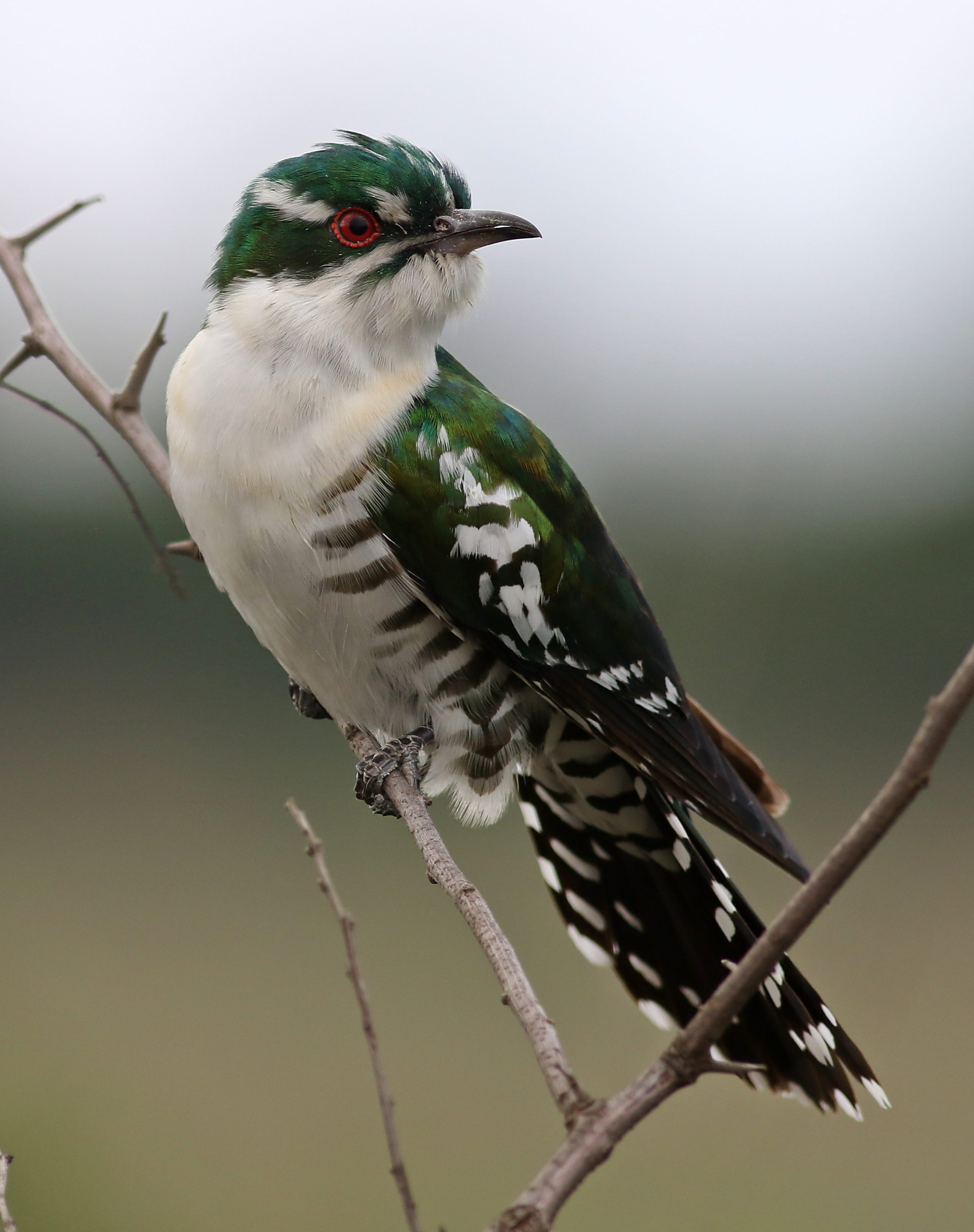
At Rietvlei Nature Reserve, Gauteng, South Africa

The diederik cuckoo is a smallish cuckoo at 18 to 20 cm. Adult males are glossy green above with copper-sheened areas on the back and whitish underparts. They have a broken white eye-stripe and a short, green malar stripe. All remiges have three to four white spots on the inner vanes. The four green outer tail feathers are tipped white, and the outermost pair are spotted white on both vanes.

Females show more copper above, and have coppery barring on the flanks. The underparts are often washed brownish.

Juveniles have a red bill, streaky throat and a white wing-bar. They are more copper-coloured above and browner below than the females, and the flank markings are brown blotches.

== Behaviour ==
=== Breeding ===
The diederik cuckoo is a brood parasite. It lays a single egg mostly in the nests of weavers, especially the village weaver and the bishops in the genus Euplectes. For example, it has been recorded in red-collared widowbirds.

=== Feeding ===
The diederik cuckoo takes a variety of insects and insect larvae. It is a noisy species, with the persistent and loud deed-deed-deed-deed-er-ick call from which it gets its name. Usually four clear, roughly identical, notes followed by a little twitter.

== Distribution and habitat ==
It is a common resident breeder in Sub-Saharan Africa and the southern Arabian Peninsula. It has been recorded as far north as Cyprus (1982 & 2023). It is a short-distance seasonal migrant, moving with the rains. It is a solitary bird, found in open woodland, savanna and riverside bushes.
