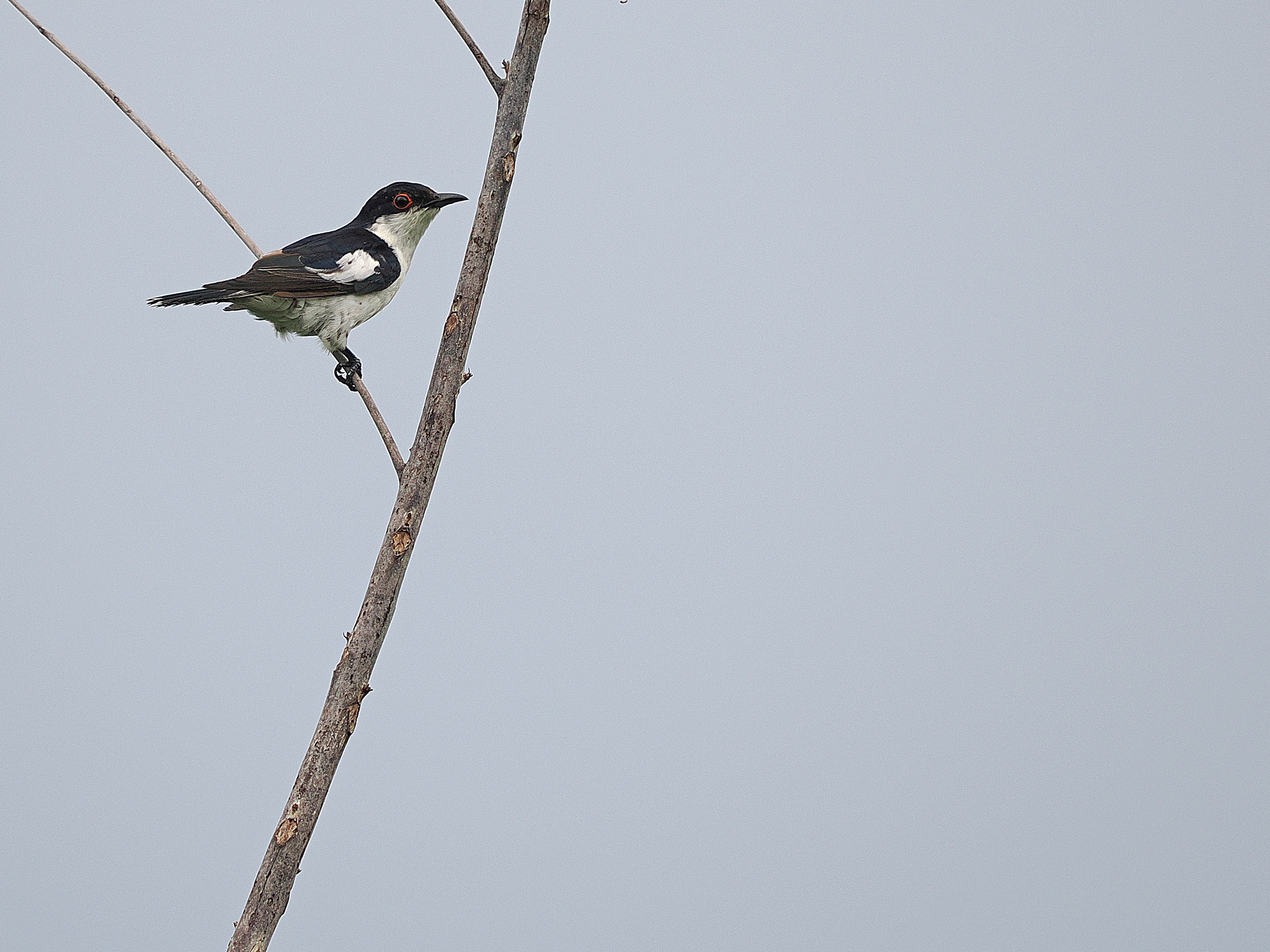

Conservation status
- Least Concern (IUCN 3.1)

Scientific classification
- Kingdom: Animalia
- Phylum: Chordata
- Class: Aves
- Order: Cuculiformes
- Family: Cuculidae
- Genus: Chalcites
- Species: C. crassirostris

Binomial name
- Chalcites crassirostris (Salvadori, 1878)

= Pied bronze cuckoo =

Species of bird

The pied bronze cuckoo (Chalcites crassirostris) is a species of cuckoo in the family Cuculidae. It is found on the Tayandu Islands, the Kai Islands and the Tanimbar Islands, all of which are part of the Maluku Islands in Southeast Asia. It was formerly treated as conspecific with the little bronze cuckoo (Chalcites minutillus).

== Taxonomy ==
The pied bronze cuckoo was formally described in 1878 by the Italian zoologist Tommaso Salvadori under the binomial name Lamprococcyx crassirostris. The type locality is Tual on the island of Kai Kecil (Little Kai Island) in the Maluku Islands. It is now one of the eight species placed in the genus Chalcites was introduced in 1830 by the French naturalist René Lesson. The genus name is from Ancient Greek χαλκιτης (khalkitēs) meaning "containing copper" or "coppery". The specific epithet crassirostris combines the Latin crassus meaning "thick", "heavy" with -rostris meaning "-billed". This species was formerly considered as one of the subspecies of the widely distributed little bronze cuckoo (Chalcites minutillus). It was elevated to species status based on its distinct plumage and vocalization.
