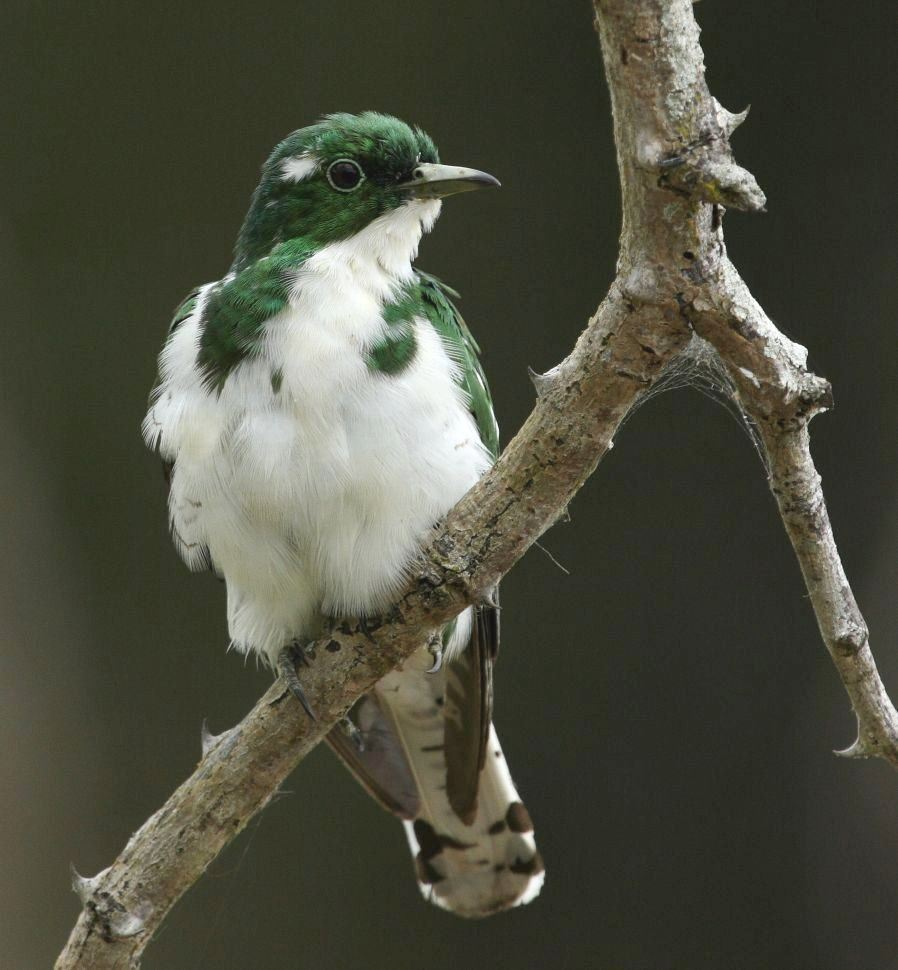
- Male Klass's cuckoo in Mpumalanga, South Africa
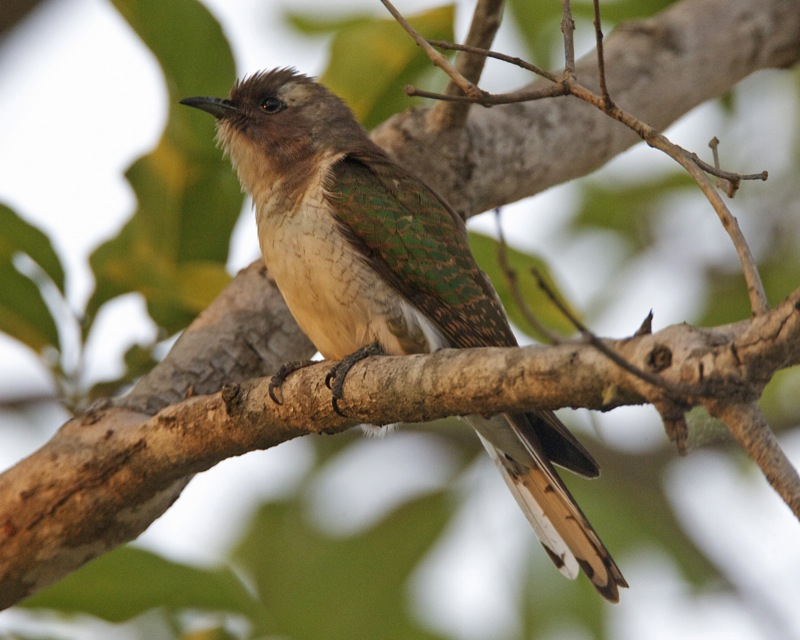
- Female Klass's cuckoo in Mpumalanga, South Africa

Conservation status
- Least Concern (IUCN 3.1)

Scientific classification
- Kingdom: Animalia
- Phylum: Chordata
- Class: Aves
- Order: Cuculiformes
- Family: Cuculidae
- Genus: Chrysococcyx
- Species: C. klaas

Binomial name
- Chrysococcyx klaas (Stephens, 1815)

= Klaas's cuckoo =

Species of bird

Klaas's cuckoo (Chrysococcyx klaas) is a species of cuckoo in the family Cuculidae which is native to the wooded regions of sub-Saharan Africa. The specific name honours Klaas, the Khoikhoi man who collected the type specimen.

== Name ==
The species was named Le Coucou de Klaas by French explorer François Le Vaillant in 1806, in his book Histoire naturelle des oiseaux d'Afrique in recognition of his Khoikhoi servant and assistant, named Klaas, who found the type specimen. Le Vaillant wrote: (Note: "...my friend Klaas ... Receive my homage to you here ... May naturalists preserve for the species I am going to describe, the name I give it, and thus consecrate the services you have rendered me: they will prove to me by this that my work has had some value in their eyes.")

...mon ami Klaas ... Recois l'hommage que je t'adresse ici ... Puissent les naturalistes conserver à l'espèce que je vais décrire, le nom que je lui donne, et consacre ainsi les services que tu m'as rendus: ils me prouveront par là que mes travaux ont eu quelque prix à leurs yeux.

Le Vaillant's wish was honoured when the bird's first binomial name, Cuculus klaas, was applied by James Francis Stephens in 1815, and the tribute to Klaas has persisted to the present binomial.

The bird is the first known case of a species being named after an Indigenous individual, and Le Vaillant is one of the only colonial biologists to name bird species after local people. Edgar Leopold Layard named the brown-breasted flycatcher after Muttu, his servant.

== Range ==
The species occurs throughout sub-Saharan Africa with the exception of very arid areas in the south-west.

== Description ==
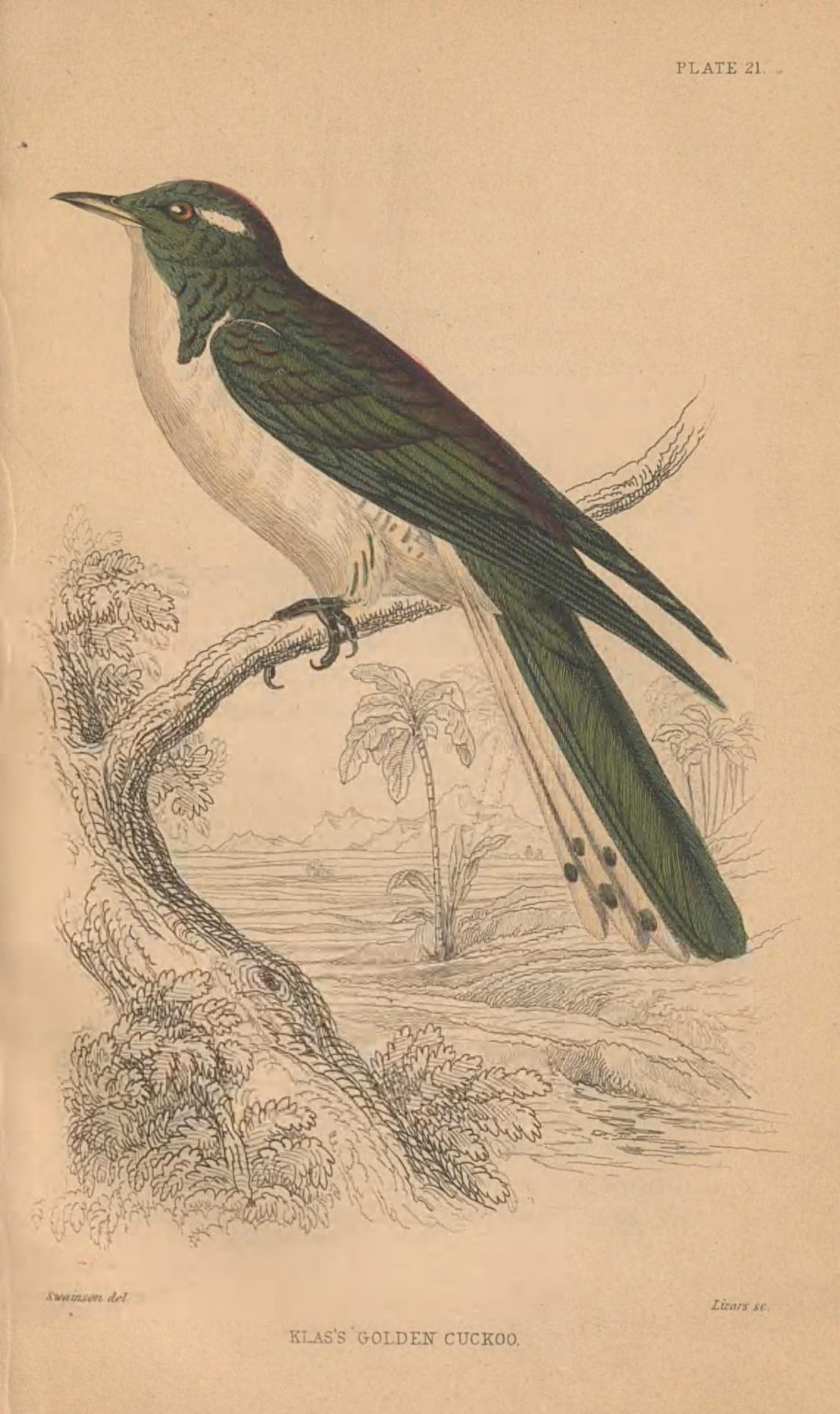
Engraving by William Lizars after William Swainson from Sir William Jardine's "Naturalist's Library: Ornithology" (v. 12, 1853 edition).

Klaas's cuckoo is 16–18 cm (6.3–7.1 inches) in length. The species exhibits sexual dimorphism. Males have a glossy green body with few markings and plain white underparts. Females have a bronze-brown body, greenish wing coverts and faintly barred white underparts. Viewed in flight, the male is largely white with dark primaries and females appear mostly brown. Males and females both have a small white post-ocular patch.
