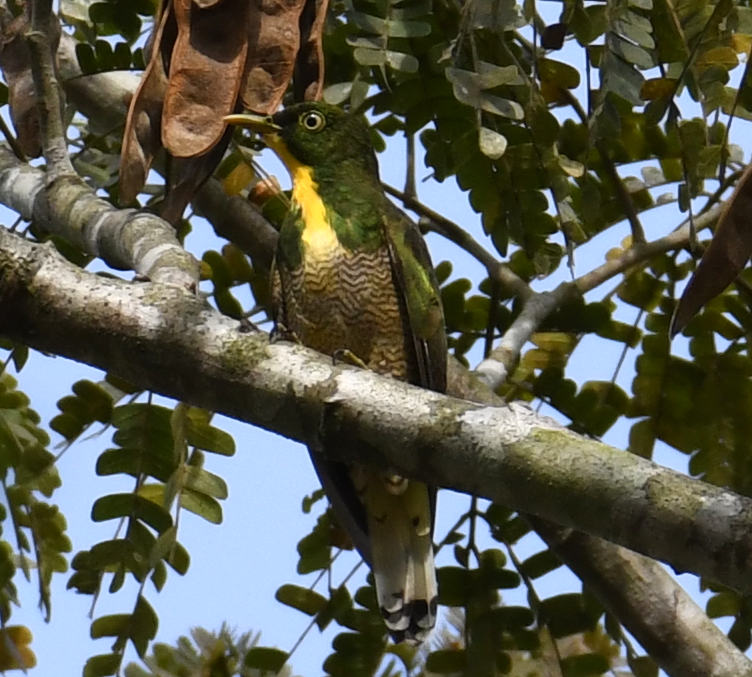

Conservation status
- Least Concern (IUCN 3.1)

Scientific classification
- Kingdom: Animalia
- Phylum: Chordata
- Class: Aves
- Order: Cuculiformes
- Family: Cuculidae
- Genus: Chrysococcyx
- Species: C. flavigularis

Binomial name
- Chrysococcyx flavigularis Shelley, 1880

= Yellow-throated cuckoo =

Species of bird

The yellow-throated cuckoo (Chrysococcyx flavigularis) is a species of cuckoo in the family Cuculidae. It is sparsely present across the African tropical rainforest and Jos Plateau (northern Nigeria). It is threatened by deforestation.

Yellow-throated cuckoos are obligate brood parasites; they always lay their eggs in other birds' nests. Their only known host is the grey-throated tit-flycatcher, (Myioparus griseigularis).
