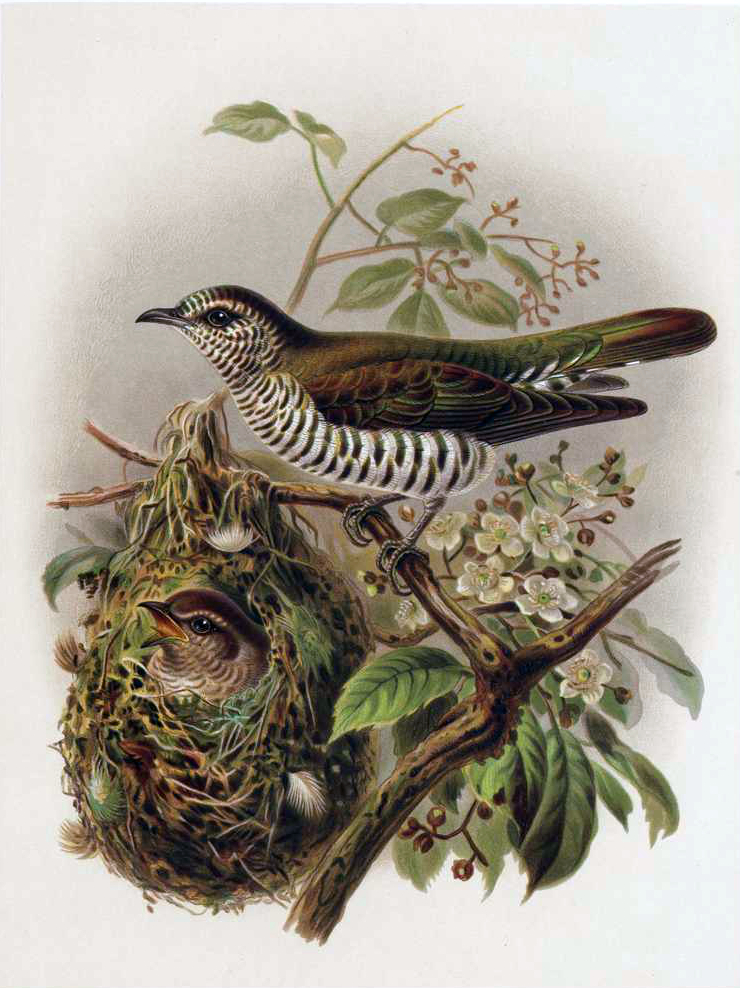
- Shining bronze cuckoo (Chalcites lucidus)

Scientific classification
- Domain: Eukaryota
- Kingdom: Animalia
- Phylum: Chordata
- Class: Aves
- Order: Cuculiformes
- Family: Cuculidae
- Genus: Chalcites; Lesson, RP, 1830

Type species
- Cuculus plagosus Latham, 1801

= Chalcites =

Genus of birds

Chalcites is a genus of Australasian cuckoos in the family Cuculidae. They were formerly placed in the genus Chrysococcyx.

== Taxonomy ==
The genus Chalcites was introduced in 1830 by the French naturalist René Lesson. The type species is, by tautology, Cuculus chalcites which is a junior synonym of Cuculus plagosus Latham, now considered to be a subspecies of the shining bronze cuckoo (Chalcites lucidus). The genus name is from Ancient Greek χαλκιτης (khalkitēs) meaning "containing copper" or "coppery".

The cuckoos in this genus were formerly placed with group of Afro-Asian cuckoos in the genus Chrysococcyx. They were moved to Chalcites based on differences in morphology and the lack of significant sexual dimorphism.

The genus contains eight species:

- Long-billed cuckoo, Chalcites megarhynchus
- Horsfield's bronze cuckoo, Chalcites basalis
- Black-eared cuckoo, Chalcites osculans
- Rufous-throated bronze cuckoo, Chalcites ruficollis
- Shining bronze cuckoo, Chalcites lucidus
- White-eared bronze cuckoo, Chalcites meyerii
- Little bronze cuckoo, Chalcites minutillus
- Pied bronze cuckoo, Chalcites crassirostris
