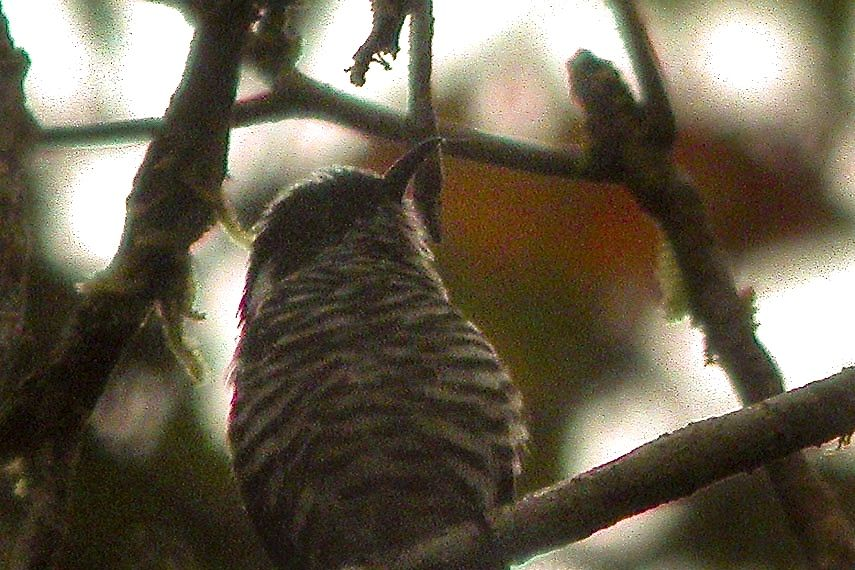

Conservation status
- Least Concern (IUCN 3.1)

Scientific classification
- Kingdom: Animalia
- Phylum: Chordata
- Class: Aves
- Order: Cuculiformes
- Family: Cuculidae
- Genus: Chalcites
- Species: C. meyerii

Binomial name
- Chalcites meyerii (Salvadori, 1874)

= White-eared bronze cuckoo =

Species of bird

The white-eared bronze cuckoo (Chalcites meyerii) is a species of cuckoo in the family Cuculidae. It was formerly placed in the genus Chrysococcyx. It is found in New Guinea.
