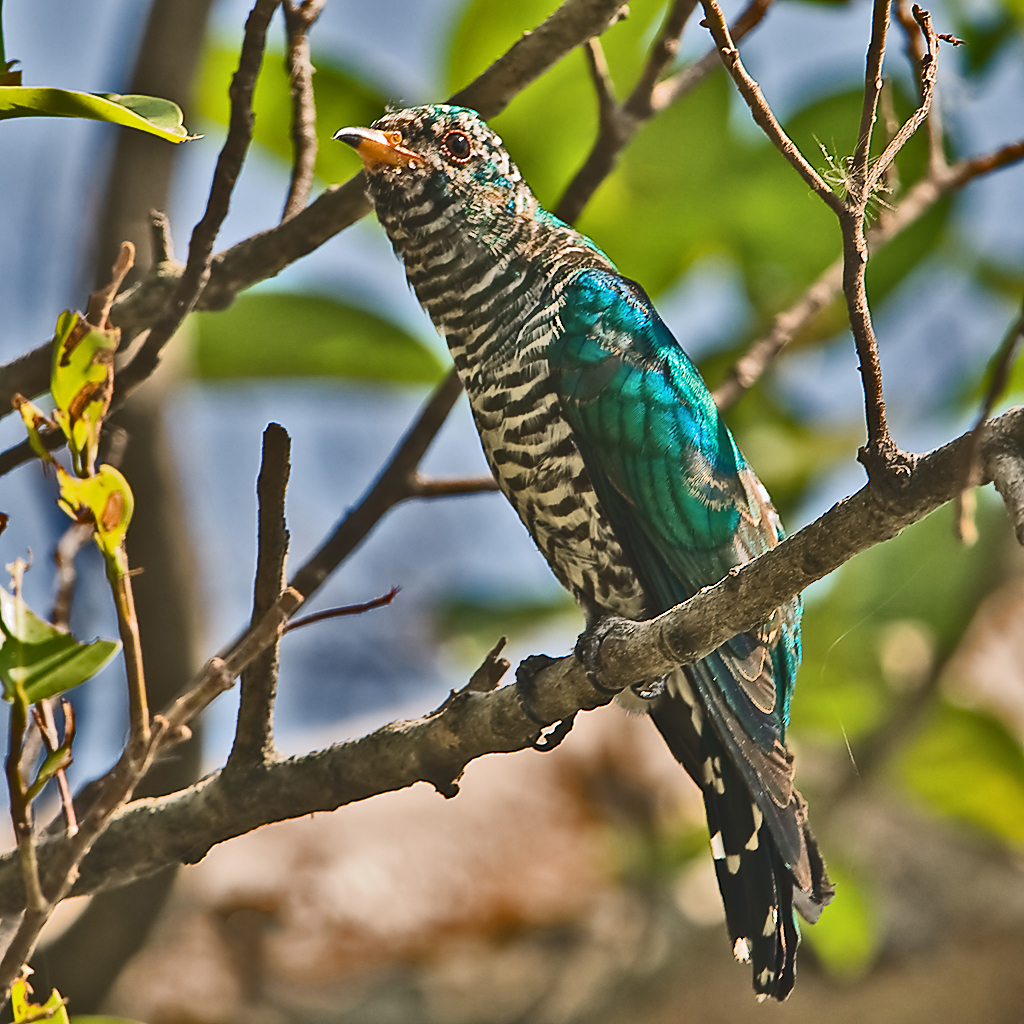
- Male (♂) from Rama IX Park in Bangkok, Thailand
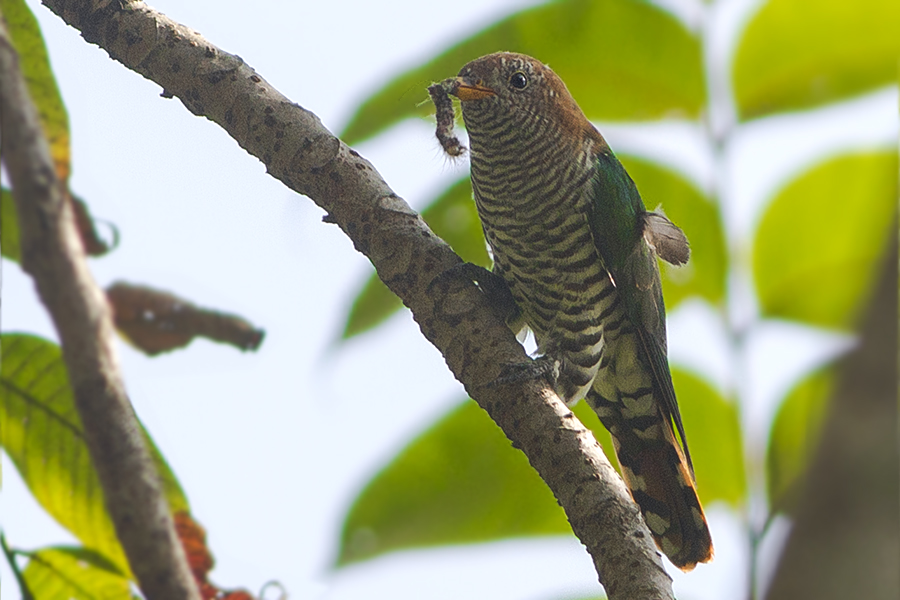
- Female (♀) from Mahananda WLS in West Bengal, India

Conservation status
- Least Concern (IUCN 3.1)

Scientific classification
- Kingdom: Animalia
- Phylum: Chordata
- Class: Aves
- Order: Cuculiformes
- Family: Cuculidae
- Genus: Chrysococcyx
- Species: C. maculatus

Binomial name
- Chrysococcyx maculatus (Gmelin, JF, 1788)

= Asian emerald cuckoo =

Species of bird

The Asian emerald cuckoo (Chrysococcyx maculatus) is a species of cuckoo in the family Cuculidae. It is found in Bangladesh, Bhutan, Cambodia, China, India, Indonesia, Laos, Malaysia, Myanmar, Nepal, Sri Lanka, Thailand, and Vietnam. Its natural habitats are subtropical or tropical moist lowland forests and subtropical or tropical moist montane forest.

== Taxonomy ==
The Asian emerald cuckoo was formally described in 1788 by the German naturalist Johann Friedrich Gmelin in his revised and expanded edition of Carl Linnaeus's Systema Naturae. He placed it with all the other cuckoos in the genus Cuculus and coined the binomial name Cuculus maculatus. Gmelin based his description on the "Spotted Curucui" from Ceylon that had been described and illustrated in 1776 by the English naturalist Peter Brown. The Asian emerald cuckoo is now placed together with 12 other species in the genus Chrysococcyx that was introduced in 1826 by the German zoologist Friedrich Boie. The genus name combines the Ancient Greek χρυσος khrusos meaning "gold" with κοκκυξ kokkux "cuckoo". The specific epithet maculatus is from Latin and means "spotted" or "blotched". The species is monotypic: no subspecies are recognised.

== Description ==
The Asian emerald cuckoo grows to a length of about 18 cm (7 in). The adult male has an iridescent dark green head, upper parts and upper breast, a white lower breast and a green barred belly. Bare skin round the eye is orange and the beak is orange/yellow tipped with black. The adult female has coppery-green upper parts, rusty brown crown and nape and green-barred underparts. Both sexes show a white band on the underwing when in flight. The underparts of the juvenile male lack the white lower breast and are more heavily barred. The voice is a "chweek" uttered while flying, and various whistled twitters.

== Distribution and habitat ==
This cuckoo has a breeding range that extends from the Himalayas eastwards to Myanmar, China and northern Thailand. Further south it is a vagrant or migrant in northern India, Sri Lanka, Malaysia and Sumatra; it is not known to breed in these areas. It frequents forests and woodland margins.

== Ecology ==
The Asian emerald cuckoo mainly forages in the upper levels of the canopy where it feeds on insects and other small invertebrates, including ants, caterpillars and bugs. It is a brood parasite, the females laying their eggs in the nests of other birds, such as the crimson sunbird (Aethopyga siparaja) and the little spiderhunter (Arachnothera longirostra).

== Status ==
C. maculatus has a very wide range but is generally an uncommon species. No particular threats have been recognised and the population is believed to be stable, so the International Union for Conservation of Nature has assessed its conservation status as being of "least concern".
