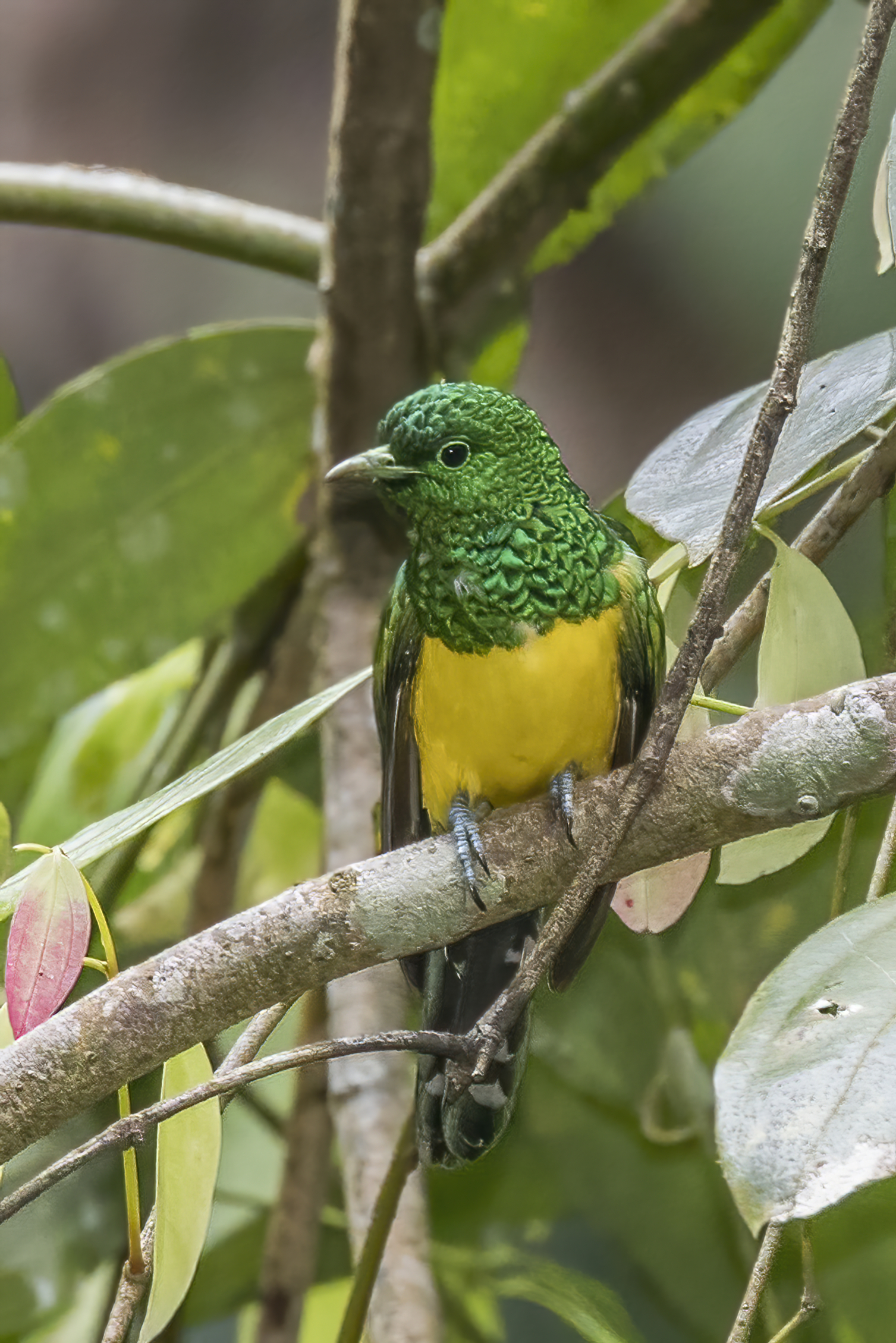
- Male C. c. intermedius São Tomé and Príncipe
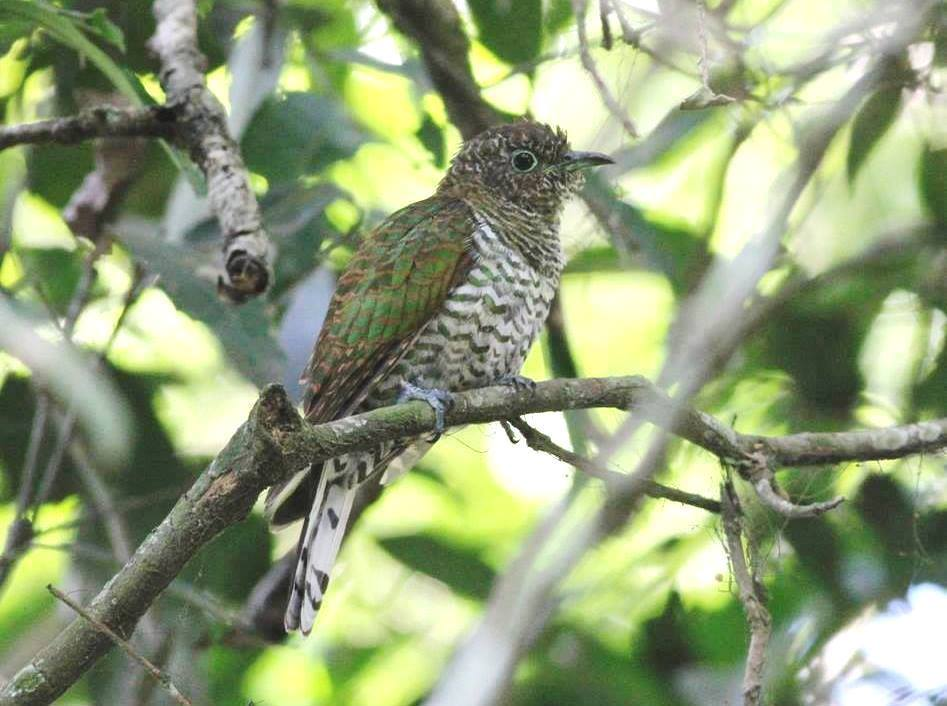
- Female *C. c. Eshowe, KwaZulu-Natal

Conservation status
- Least Concern (IUCN 3.1)

Scientific classification
- Kingdom: Animalia
- Phylum: Chordata
- Class: Aves
- Order: Cuculiformes
- Family: Cuculidae
- Genus: Chrysococcyx
- Species: C. cupreus

Binomial name
- Chrysococcyx cupreus (Shaw, 1792)

= African emerald cuckoo =

Species of bird

The African emerald cuckoo (Chrysococcyx cupreus) is a species of cuckoo that is native to Africa.

== Taxonomy and phylogeny ==
As a member of the family Cuculidae, the African emerald cuckoo is an Old World cuckoo. There are four subspecies, namely C. c. cupreus, C. c. sharpei, C. c. intermedius, and C. c. insularum.

- C. c. cupreus: Africa south of the Sahara
- C. c. intermedius: Bioko (Gulf of Guinea)
- C. c. insularum: São Tomé, Príncipe, and Annobón (Gulf of Guinea)

== Distribution ==
Its range covers most of sub-Saharan Africa, including Angola, Botswana, Burundi, Cameroon, Central African Republic, Republic of the Congo, DRC, Ivory Coast, Equatorial Guinea, Eritrea, Eswatini, Ethiopia, Gabon, Gambia, Ghana, Guinea, Guinea-Bissau, Kenya, Liberia, Malawi, Mali, Mozambique, Namibia, Nigeria, Rwanda, São Tomé and Príncipe, Senegal, Sierra Leone, South Africa, South Sudan, Tanzania, Togo, Uganda, Zambia, and Zimbabwe.

== Description ==
The African emerald cuckoo is sexually dimorphic. The males have a green back and head with a yellow breast. Females are barred green and brown on their backs and green and white on their breasts. The African emerald cuckoo can also be identified by its call, a four-note whistle with the mnemonic device of "Hello Ju-dy."

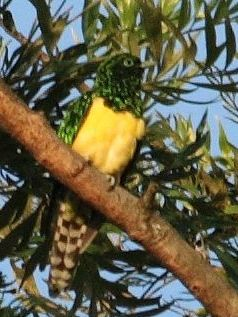
male C. c. cupreus, KwaZulu-Natal

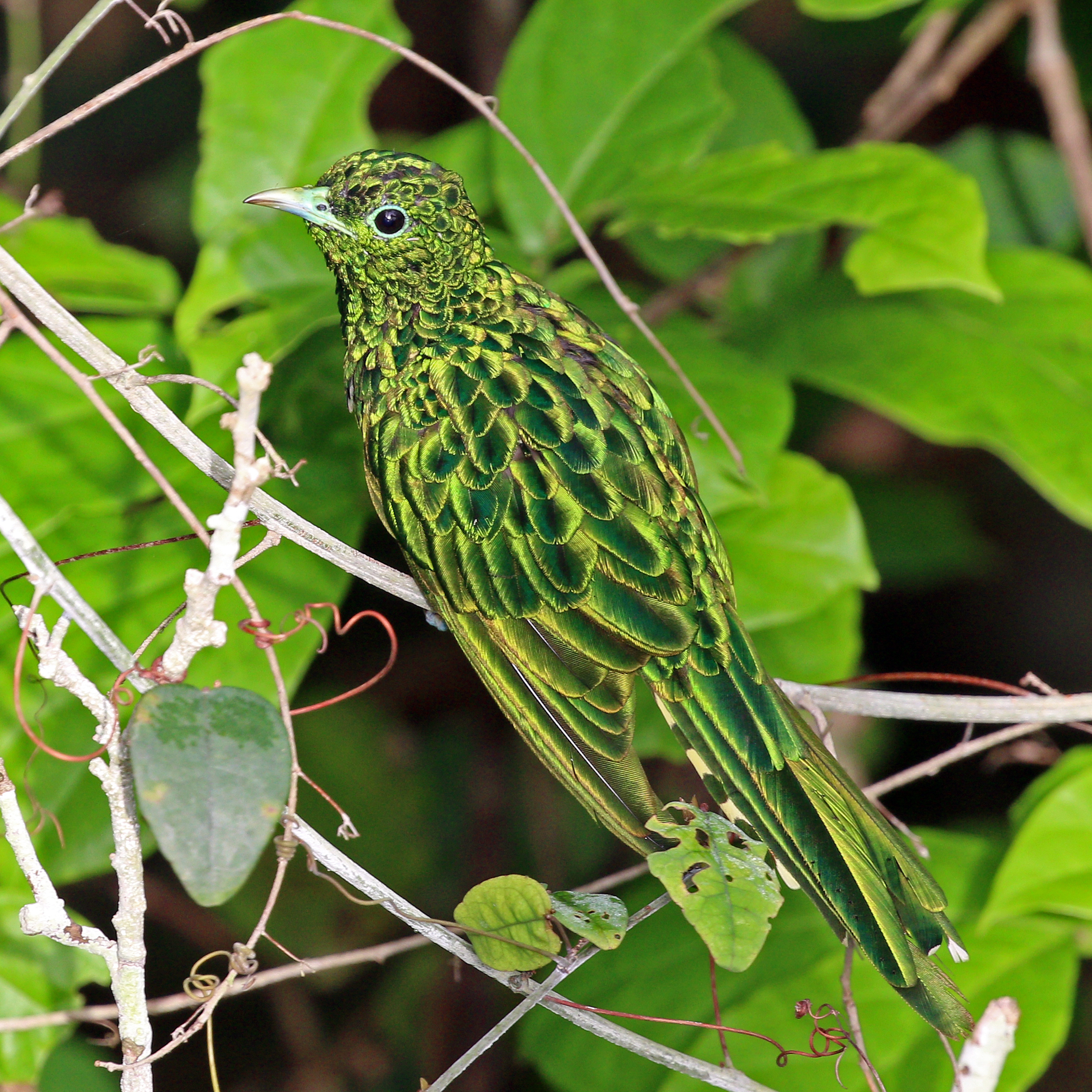
male C. c. cupreus, Ghana

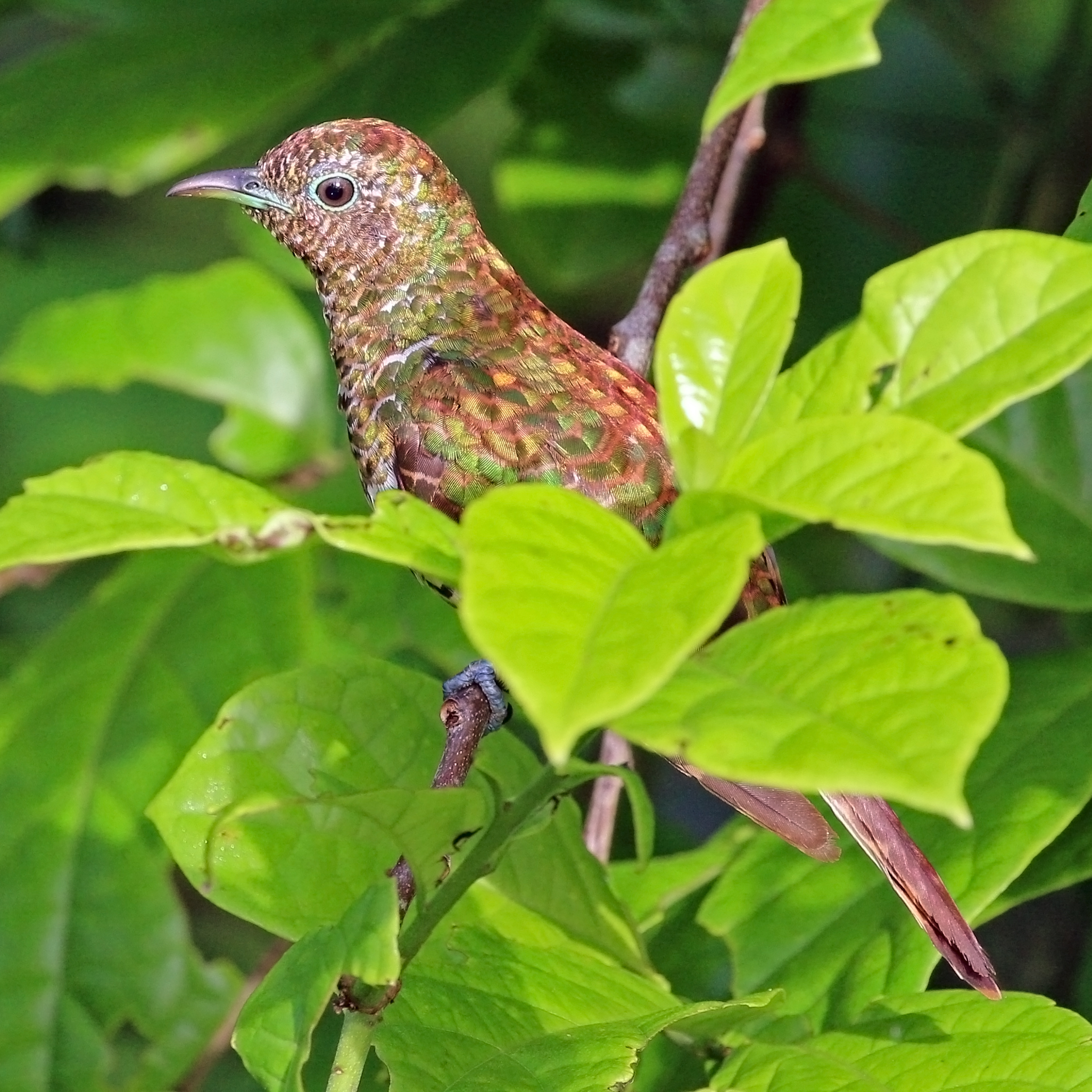
female C. c. cupreus, Ghana

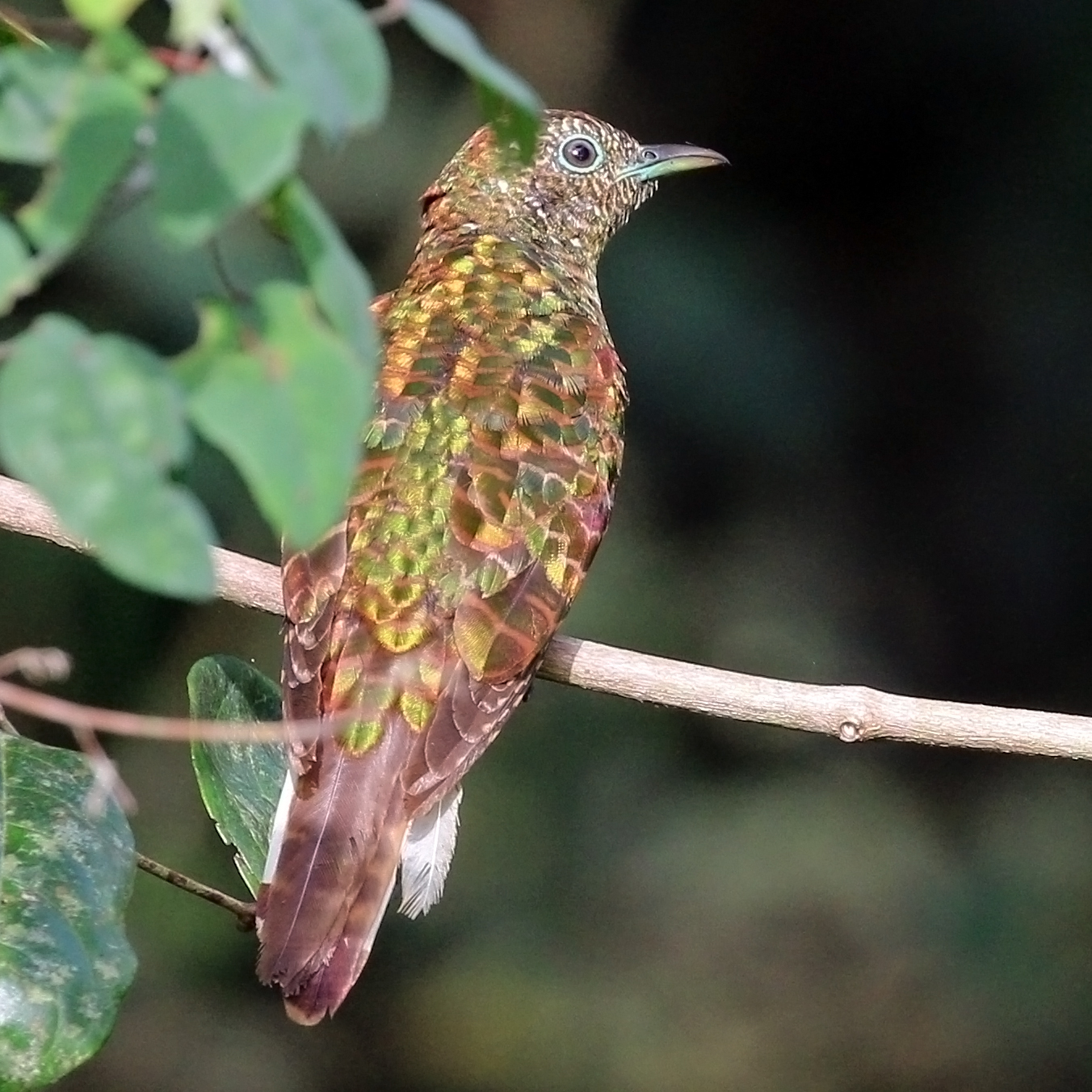
female C. c. cupreus, Ghana

== Diet ==
The cuckoo's diet consists mainly of insects like caterpillars and ants. The diet can be supplemented with some fruit, and the African emerald cuckoo often forages in the middle and top layers of the canopy.

== Breeding ==
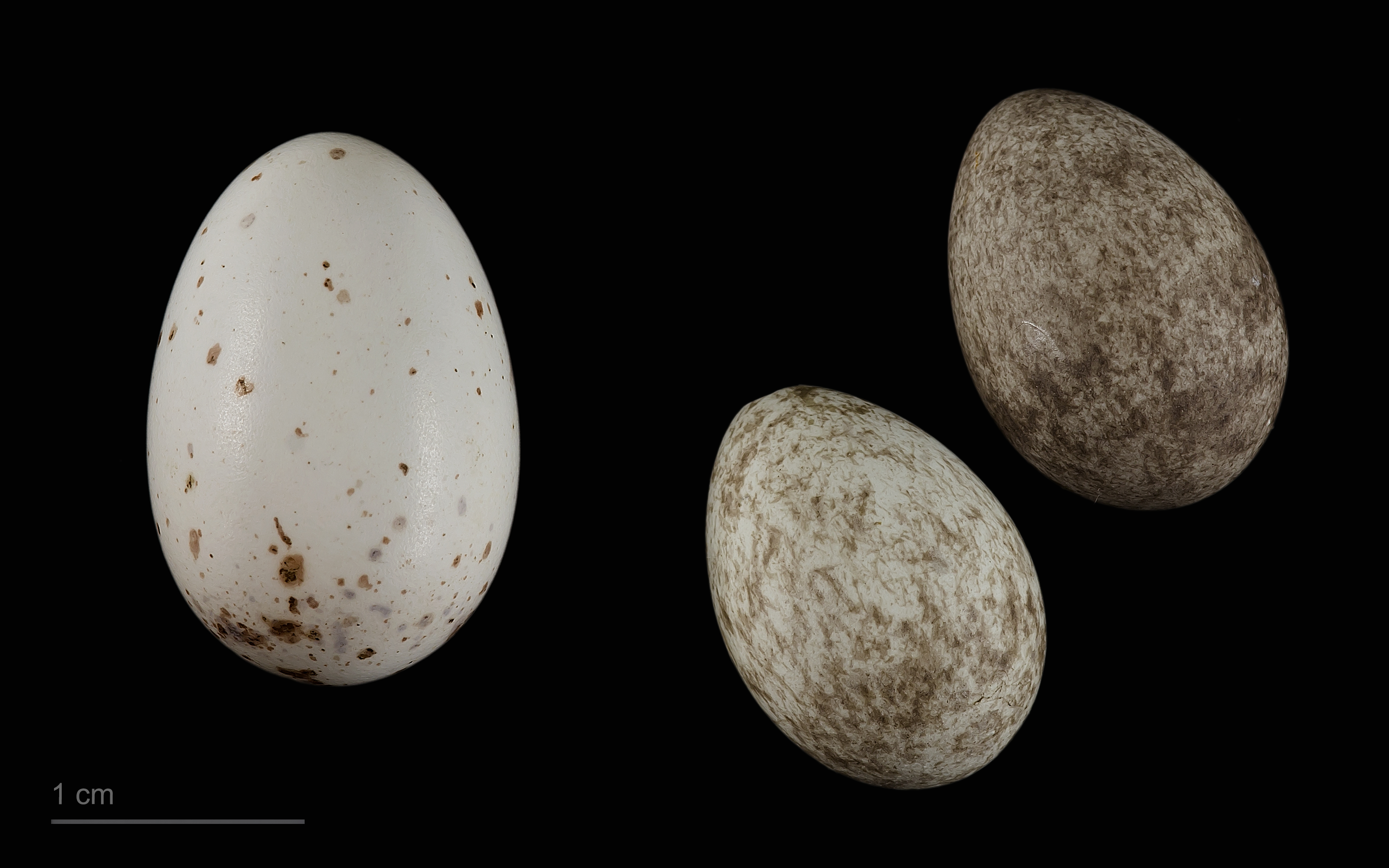
Chrysococcyx cupreus in a spawn of Anabathmis newtonii - MHNT

Like most cuckoos, the African emerald cuckoo is a brood parasite. Female African emerald cuckoos lay eggs in the nests of other bird species. A female cuckoo can lay between 19 and 25 eggs on average per breeding season. The breeding season occurs during the rainy seasons, generally during the months between September and March. Even though the cuckoos do not need territory to feed fledglings, male African emerald cuckoos still maintain territories to display themselves to potential mates.

== Conservation status and threats ==
The cuckoo's distribution is 11,400,000 km (7,100,000 mi) across sub-Saharan Africa, and subsequently the species is not in any immediate threat of decline. However, there is some concern about habitat reduction and fragmentation of riparian areas and lowland forests in the upcoming years.

== Folklore ==
In the Zigula language its call has been rendered as ziwkulwa tuoge, ("let's go and bathe"). In Zulu it is known as ubantwanyana, or "little children", which suggests the song Bantwanyana! ning'endi!, or "Little children, don't get married!". In Xhosa it is mostly known as intananja, but its call is also rendered as ziph' iintombi?, meaning "where are the girls?" In Afrikaans, it is known as the mooimeisie, or "pretty girl".
