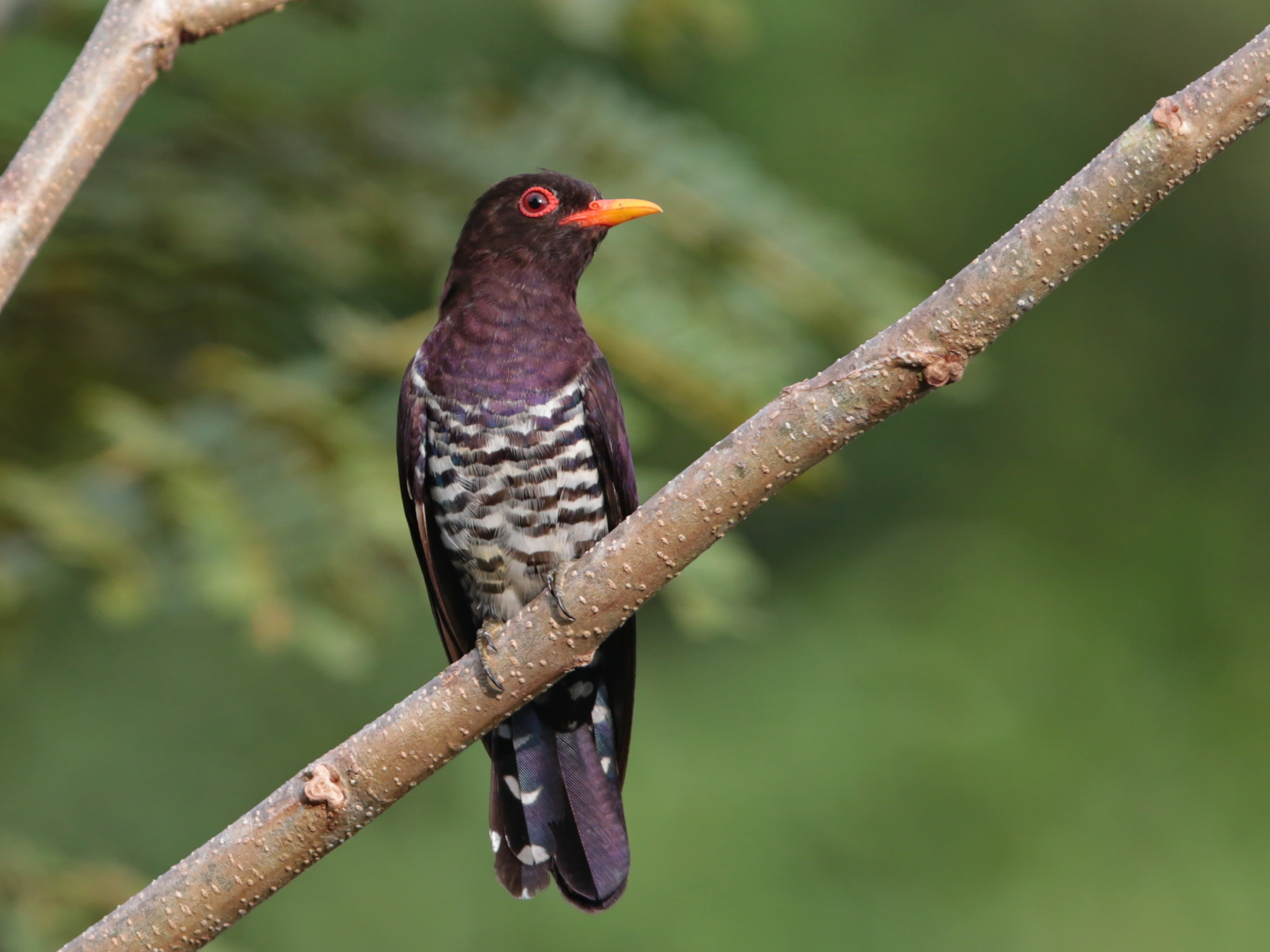
- nominate subspecies

Conservation status
- Least Concern (IUCN 3.1)

Scientific classification
- Kingdom: Animalia
- Phylum: Chordata
- Class: Aves
- Order: Cuculiformes
- Family: Cuculidae
- Genus: Chrysococcyx
- Species: C. xanthorhynchus

Binomial name
- Chrysococcyx xanthorhynchus (Horsfield, 1821)

= Violet cuckoo =

Species of bird

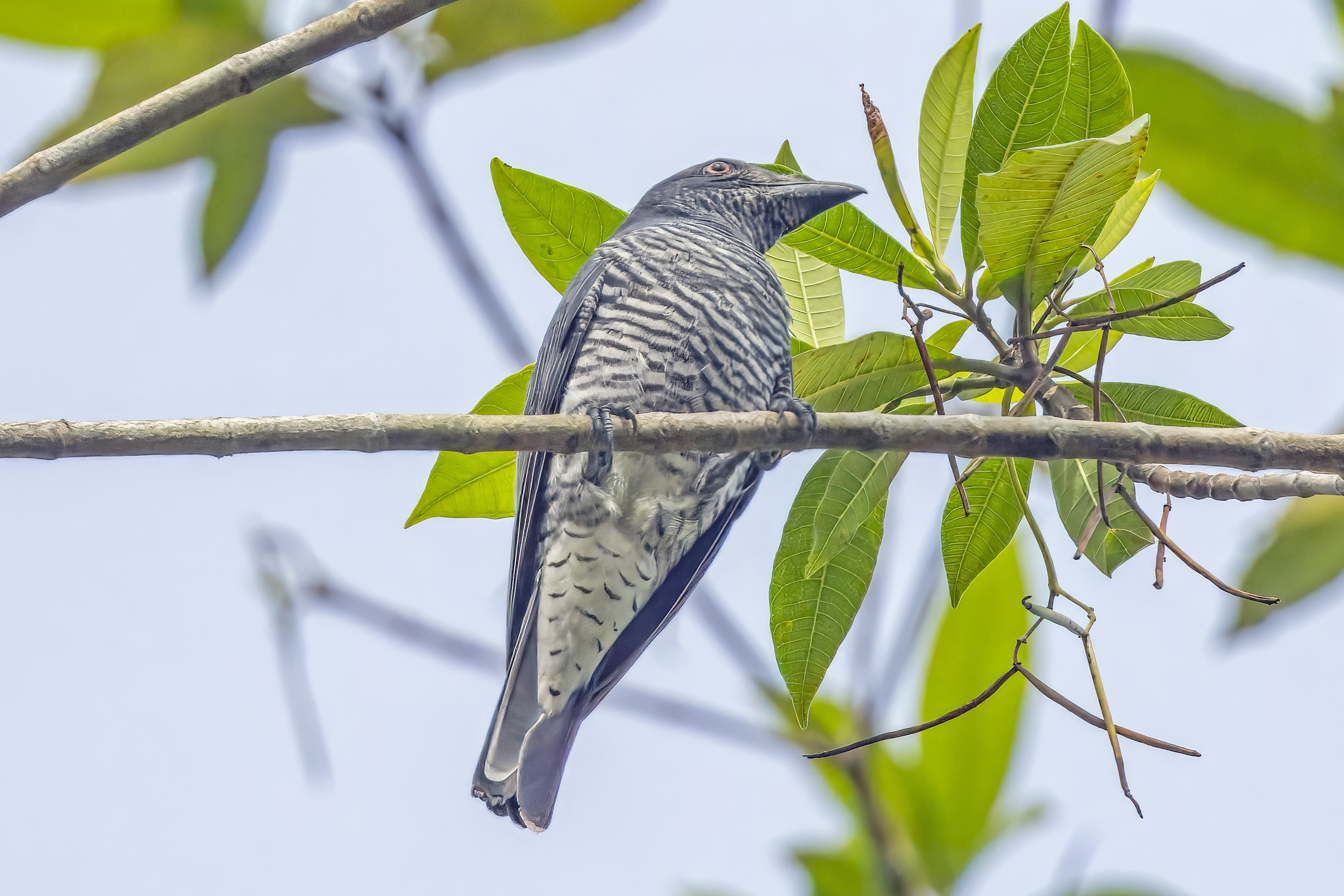
C. x. amethystinus female, Bohol, Philippines

The violet cuckoo (Chrysococcyx xanthorhynchus) is a species of cuckoo in the family Cuculidae.

== Description ==
The males have glossy violet feathers on the head and upper parts of the body. The blackish tail has a white tip, and barred outer feathers. The most spectacular feature is the brightly iridescent violet chin and upper breast. The belly is white with broad black, green or violet bars. Mature males also have a red eye-ring. The closely related species, C. amethystinus has a glossy blue-violet throat patch rather than reddish violet of this cuckoo.

The females have mottled, greenish-bronze upper parts and a dark brown crown. There are white markings around the eyes and sometimes on the forehead. The central tail feathers are greenish while the outer feathers are rufous with greenish bars. The outer rectrices are barred black and white. The breast is whitish with bronze-green bars and variably washed rufous markings.

Juveniles have barred rufous and greenish bronze feathers on the upper parts of the body, a bright rufous crown, rufous and mottled green or brown wings, a barred brown and rufous tail and brown-barred white under parts.

== Distribution and habitat ==
The violet cuckoo is found from north-eastern India to Southeast Asia, Greater Sundas, Palawan and the Philippines. Southern populations are resident, while northern populations in locations such as Assam and Bangladesh appear to be migratory.

Its natural habitats are subtropical or tropical moist lowland forests and subtropical or tropical mangrove forests. It is also seen in gardens, orchards, and rubber plantations. It occurs from lowlands up to 1500m, but mainly below 700m.

The species is reported to be uncommon throughout its range. However, because it has a wide range, the species is not considered to be threatened by the IUCN. However one source suggests that the species is threatened in areas of its range because of habitat loss.

== Behaviour ==
Violet cuckoos are insectivorous but they will also eat fruit. They have been seen shaking hairy caterpillars to remove the stomach contents for consumption. They forage by creeping up and down branches, but they can also flycatch on the wing.

Cuckoos are brood parasites and lay their eggs in the nests of other birds. The males are active and vocal during the breeding season in order to attract mates. Once they have mated, the females become secretive as they search for appropriate nests in which to lay their eggs.

Host species recorded for the violet cuckoo are sunbirds and spiderhunters (thirteen species of the genus Arachnothera, small birds related to sunbirds). Host species often recognise adult cuckoos as a threat and chase them off, but then do not recognise that the cuckoo eggs in the nest are aliens. Cuckoo chicks are usually larger than host chicks. The chicks of many cuckoo species have been observed to throw the host chicks out of the nest, although this behaviour has not been recorded for the violet cuckoo yet.
