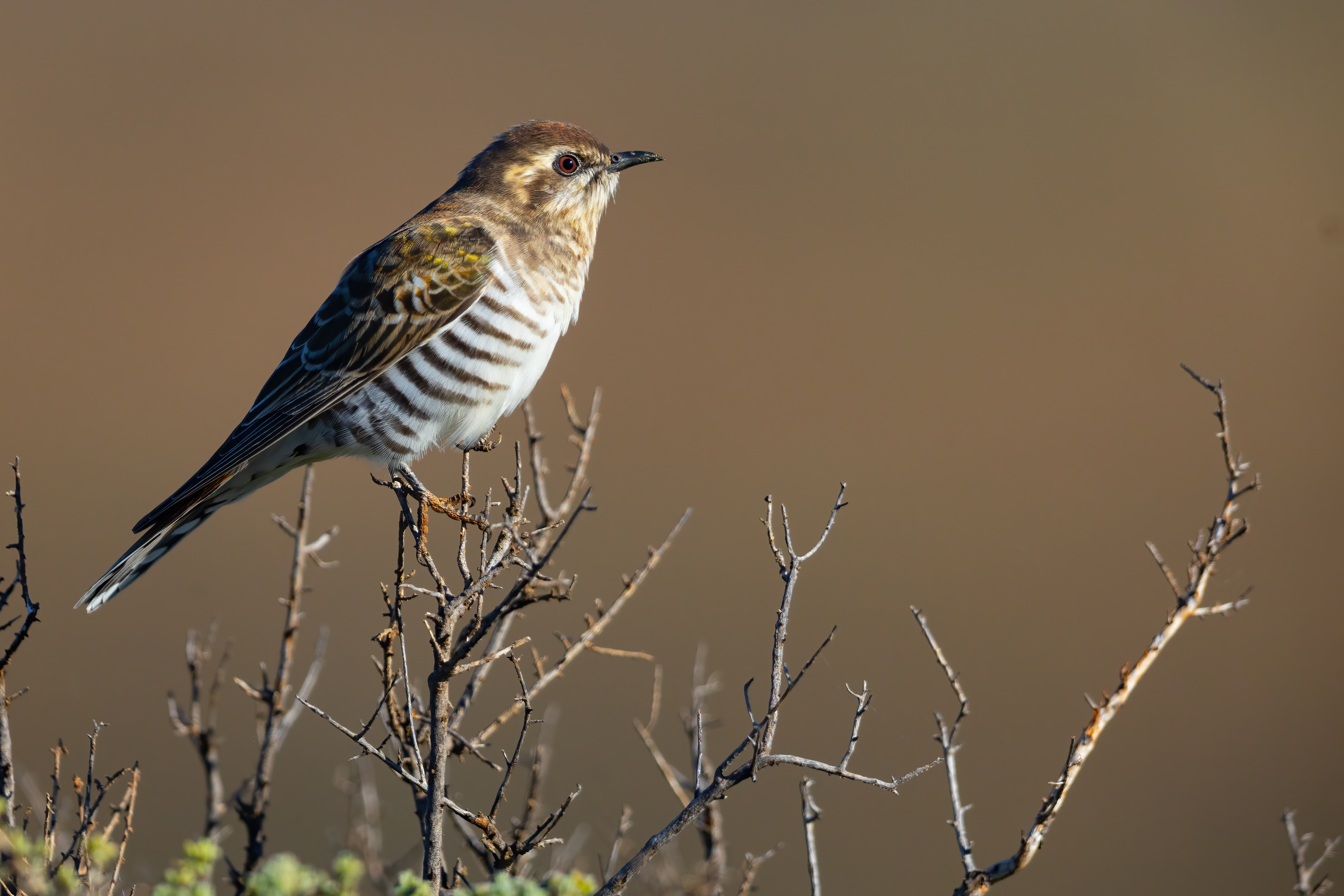

Conservation status
- Least Concern (IUCN 3.1)

Scientific classification
- Kingdom: Animalia
- Phylum: Chordata
- Class: Aves
- Order: Cuculiformes
- Family: Cuculidae
- Genus: Chalcites
- Species: C. basalis

Binomial name
- Chalcites basalis (Horsfield, 1821)

= Horsfield's bronze cuckoo =

Species of bird

Horsfield's bronze cuckoo (Chalcites basalis) is a small cuckoo in the family Cuculidae. Its size averages 22 g (0.78 oz) and is distinguished by its green and bronze iridescent colouring on its back and incomplete brown barring from neck to tail. Horsfield's bronze cuckoo can be distinguished from other bronze cuckoos by its white eyebrow and brown eye stripe. The Horsfield's bronze cuckoo is common throughout Australia preferring the drier open woodlands away from forested areas. This species was formerly placed in the genus Chrysococcyx.

== Taxonomy ==
The Horsfield's bronze cuckoo is one of five Australian species in the genus Chalcites (formerly Chrysococcyx) a type of parasitic bird, that parasitizes fairy-wrens primarily to raise their young.

== Diet and behaviour ==
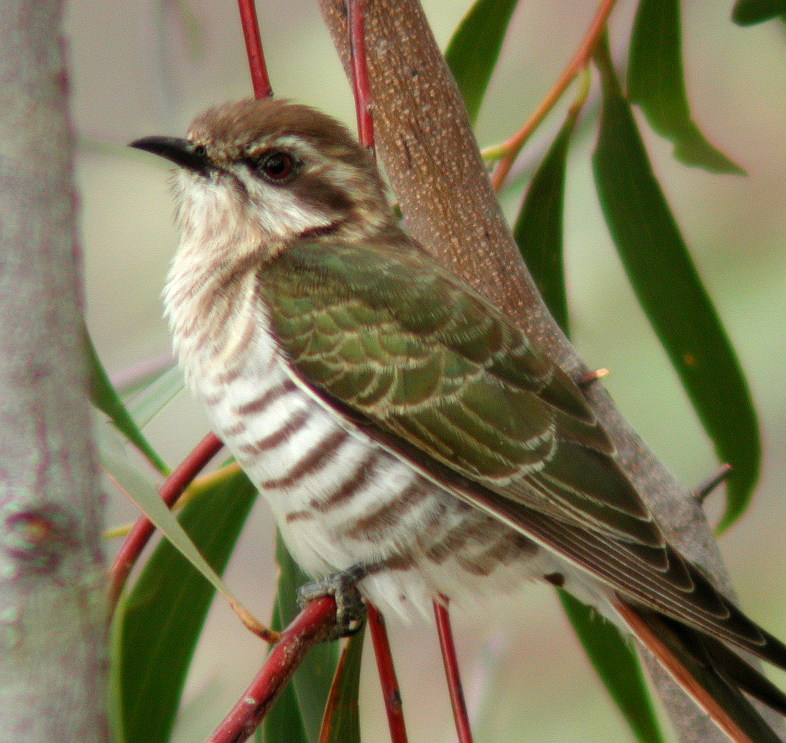
Photographed at Capertee Valley, NSW, Australia

The main diet of the Horsfield's bronze cuckoo is insects and they are nomadic, travelling to different regions of Australia to breed and find food. Small insects are taken from leaves, branches, caught on the wing and in breeding season, Horsfield's bronze cuckoos feed each other in a courtship ritual.

The Horsfield's bronze cuckoo is known as a brood parasite, this means that they lay their eggs in a host species nest. They mainly parasitize the fairy-wrens in the genus Malurus. It has been well documented that the superb fairy-wren (Malurus cyaneus) and the splendid fairy-wren (Malurus splendens) are the two main species to bear host to the Horsfield's bronze cuckoo, although they may also parasitise other small Passeriformes including thornbills, warblers and scrub-wrens that can be utilised as a secondary host in certain locations. Although the behavioural attributes of a host species may play a role in parasitism, it is thought that the female selects its host through imprinting, remembering the species that it was raised by and ultimately using that species to raise its brood.

== Breeding ==
The Horsfield's bronze cuckoos are known to form monogamous pairs in the breeding season and occupy the same breeding territories as their host species; however, partnerships are short-lived as a female will only occupy the breeding territory for a few weeks, as another female takes her place, she may form a pairing with the same male. Females that leave a breeding site after several weeks may move to another site and continue to breed with another male, forming another bond in a new breeding territory. Breeding territories of the Horsfield's bronze cuckoo generally do not overlap giving rise to the possibility that a pair will defend an area through the season.

== Range ==
The species is native to Australia and South East Asia, found in Indonesia, Papua New Guinea, Malaysia, and southern Thailand. In 2024, the first known specimen was recorded in New Zealand.

== Parasitism ==
As a brood parasite, the Horsfield's bronze cuckoo does not build its own nest but will use a host species' nest to lay its eggs. The breeding season for the Horsfield's bronze cuckoo relies on their host and they will lay one to mimic that of the fairy wren or thornbill's egg, an elongated pinkish-white egg, that is speckled with red-brown spots. The breeding season for the superb fairy-wren is between September and February and a female may have three consecutive broods in this time, allowing the cuckoo multiple attempts to parasitize this species. The female cuckoo may choose a breeding site with a high density of hosts, which allows extra opportunity for her success in parasitizing a nest successfully. Studies have shown at one site a female did not parasitize a territory with less than 23 breeding pairs of their primary host (Malurus cyaneus).

The egg of a Horsfield's bronze cuckoo is small for its size, evolving over time to mimic those of their host in what can be described as an evolutionary arms race between parasite and host. Also, the smaller the host for the cuckoo, the likelihood of successfully raising multiple broods thus the energy and nutrients needed to produce more smaller eggs than few larger eggs can be utilised more efficiently. Egg laying is very fast for the Horsfield's bronze cuckoo; it is able to lay an egg in under 6 seconds typically in the morning shortly after the host has laid. The adult cuckoo removes one egg each time she lays, only laying one egg per nest and replacing one host egg with one of her own.

Younger, semi-experienced females were generally selected over new and novice breeding females due to their success and experience. The Horsfield's bronze cuckoo chose females that would choose similar breeding sites to previous years and were likely to raise several broods in one season. Generally, the superb fairy wren will not reject the cuckoo's egg. Fairy-wrens make oval dome nests that can be dark inside, meaning it is harder for the fairy-wren to distinguish between its own egg and the host's egg. Furthermore, the mimicry in eggs from the Horsfield's bronze cuckoo has evolved over time and the parasite eggs are hard to distinguish except for their slight elongation and glossier finish.

The cuckoo chick hatches within 12 days of incubation, 2 days before the host egg, ejecting other eggs in the nests within two days of hatching, leaving the cuckoo the sole chick. As newly hatched cuckoo chicks eject host eggs they do not get to learn the host's begging call, but can possess begging call polymorphism, where nestlings produce the calls of their primary host. As the nestling grows it will be fed by the host parent and possibly the group, growing more rapidly until fledged.

== Coevolutionary arms race ==
Counter-adaptations have been documented for host species and cuckoos alike, as each adapts to the other in a coevolutionary "arms race". Studies show that coevolutions happen at all stages of the growth cycle, not just the early stages.

Fairy-wrens have adapted some host defences to reduce parasitism. The high cost of hosting a parasitic species, in energy and genetics, drives the host to improve its defences, which in turn drive the parasite to improve its offences.

Among the host's defensive adaptations:

- Hosts like to nest in large colonies, to cooperate in spotting cuckoos and chasing them away.
- Helpers in large colonies provision the female so she can spend more time guarding the nest.
- Hosts learn and recognise their own eggs, and abandon any that are in the nest before they have started their own.

Among the cuckoo's adaptations:

- Mimicry of host eggs.
- Eggs that are cryptic and therefore unable to be seen in the dark nest.
- Thickened egg shells.
- Efficiency in laying the egg, being able to lay an egg secretly and quickly while the host is absent.

== Media ==
Typical call, SE Queensland, Australia
