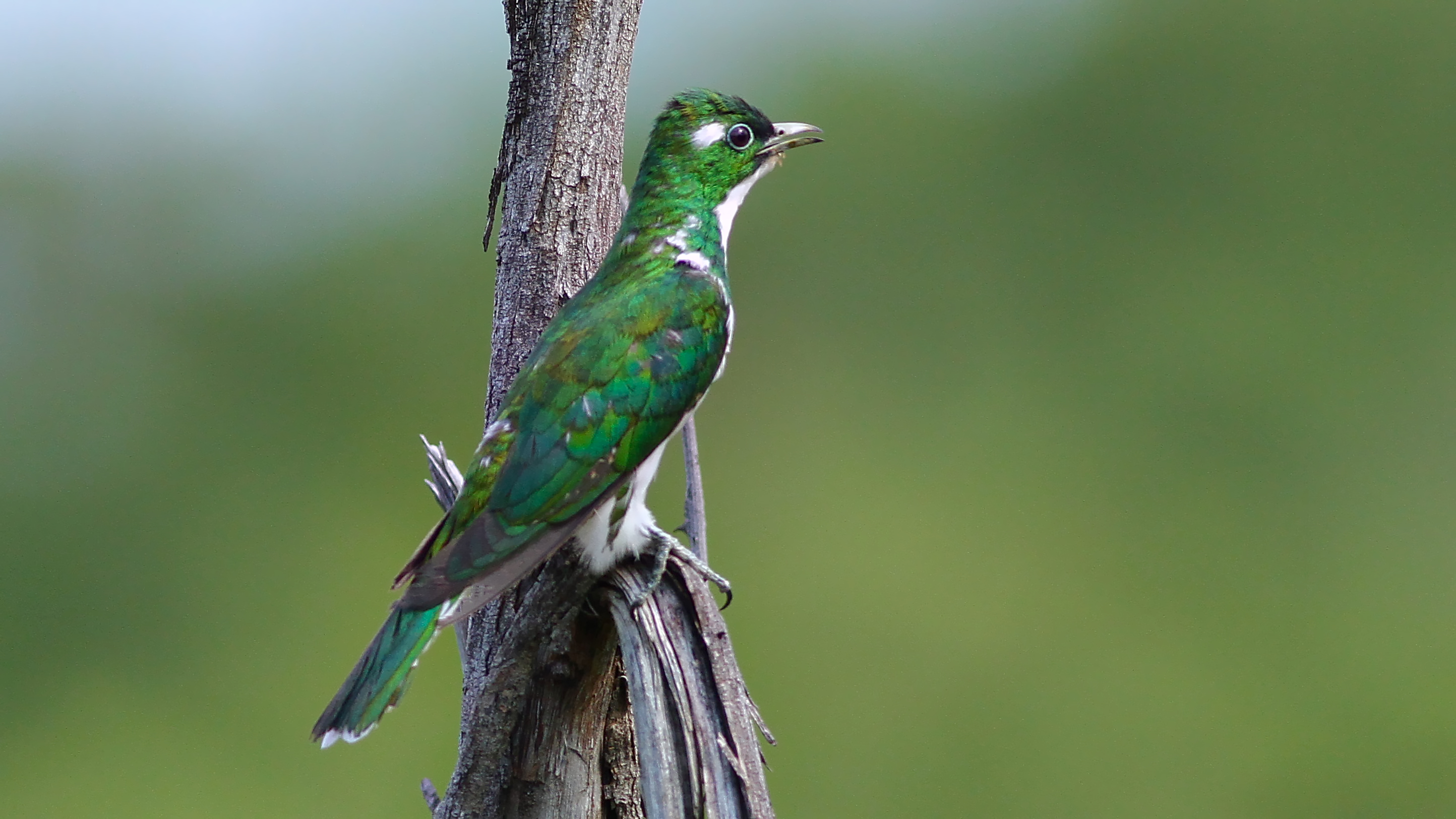
- Klaas's cuckoo (Chrysococcyx klaas)

Scientific classification
- Kingdom: Animalia
- Phylum: Chordata
- Class: Aves
- Order: Cuculiformes
- Family: Cuculidae
- Genus: Chrysococcyx; Boie, F, 1826

Type species
- Cuculus cupreus (African emerald cuckoo) Shaw, 1792

= Chrysococcyx =

Genus of birds

Chrysococcyx is a genus of cuckoos in the family Cuculidae.

== Taxonomy ==
The genus Chrysococcyx was erected by the German zoologist Friedrich Boie in 1826 with the African emerald cuckoo (Chrysococcyx cupreus) as the type species. The name Chrysococcyx comes from the Ancient Greek words χρυσος (khrusos), meaning "gold", and κοκκυξ (kokkux), meaning "cuckoo".

A group of Australo-Papuan taxa that were formerly included in this genus are now placed in the genus Chalcites.

The genus contains the following species:

Image	Scientific name	Common name	Distribution
	Chrysococcyx caprius	Diederik cuckoo	Sub-Saharan Africa and southern Arabia
	Chrysococcyx cupreus	African emerald cuckoo	Sub-Saharan Africa
	Chrysococcyx flavigularis	Yellow-throated cuckoo	African tropical rainforest
	Chrysococcyx klaas	Klaas's cuckoo	Sub-Saharan Africa
	Chrysococcyx maculatus	Asian emerald cuckoo	southern Himalayas, China and Indochina
	Chrysococcyx xanthorhynchus	Violet cuckoo	northeast India and Southeast Asia
