= List of islands of Indonesia =

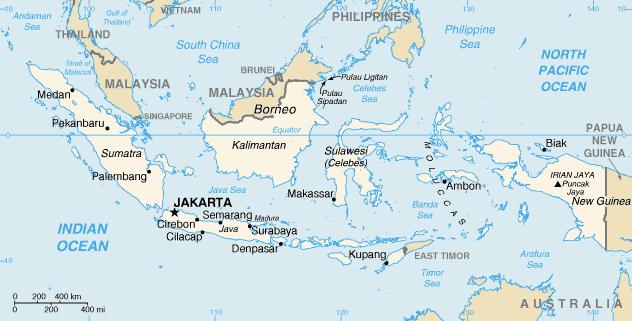
- The Indonesian archipelago is estimated to encompass 17,000 to 18,000 islands.
- Etymology: Indonesia from Greek: Ινδο (Indo, lit. 'Indies') + νησιά (nisiá, lit. 'islands'); Nusantara from Javanese: ꦤꦸꦱ (Nusa, lit. 'islands') + ꦲꦤ꧀ꦠꦫ (antara, lit. 'outer'); See also: Names of Indonesia

Geography
- Location: Southeast Asia and Oceania
- Adjacent to: Indian Ocean; Pacific Ocean
- Total islands: ± 17,000–18,000 islands
- Major islands: Java; Borneo (Excluding Malaysia’s territory and Brunei); Papua (Excluding Papua New Guinea); Sumatra; Sulawesi
- Area: 8,300,000 km^{2} (3,200,000 sq mi)
- Highest elevation: 4,884 m (16024 ft) (Note: The elevation given here was determined by the 1971–73 Australian Universities' Expedition and is supported by the Seven Summits authorities and modern high resolution radar data. An older but still often quoted elevation of 5,030 metres (16,503 ft) is obsolete.)
- Highest point: Puncak Jaya

Administration
- Indonesia
- President: Prabowo Subianto

Demographics
- Demonym: Indonesians
- Population: ± 280,000,000 (2023)
- Population rank: 4
- Pop. density: 143/km^{2} (370/sq mi)
- Pop. density rank: 88th
- Languages: See Languages of Indonesia
- Ethnic groups: See Ethnic groups in Indonesia

The islands of Indonesia, also known as the Indonesian Archipelago (Kepulauan Indonesia) or Nusantara, may refer either to the islands composing the country of Indonesia or to the geographical groups which include its islands. Indonesia is the world's largest archipelagic state and country, stretching from Sumatra in Asia to the western part of New Guinea in Oceania.

== History ==
The exact number of islands composing Indonesia varies among definitions and sources. According to the Law No. 9/1996 on Maritime Territory of Indonesia, there are 17,508 officially listed islands within the territory of the Republic of Indonesia. According to a geospatial survey conducted between 2007 and 2010 by the National Coordinating Agency for Survey and Mapping (Bakorsurtanal), Indonesia has 13,466 islands. However, according to earlier survey in 2002 by National Institute of Aeronautics and Space (LAPAN), the Indonesian archipelago has 18,307 islands, and according to the CIA World Factbook, there are 17,508 islands. The discrepancy of the numbers of Indonesian islands is due to the earlier surveys including "tidal islands"; sandy cays and rocky reefs that appear during low tide and are submerged during high tide. As of 2023, 17,024 islands have been named by Geospatial Information Agency and published in the Indonesian Gazetteer.

Modern Wawasan Nusantara the Indonesian archipelagic baselines pursuant to article 47, paragraph 9, of the UNCLOS

== Major islands ==
- Sunda Islands
  - Greater Sunda Islands
    - Java, formerly Jawa Dwipa.
    - Sumatra, formerly Swarna Dwipa.
    - Borneo: divided between the Indonesian region Kalimantan, the country of Brunei and the Malaysian states of Sabah and Sarawak.
    - Sulawesi, formerly Celebes.
  - Lesser Sunda Islands
    - Bali
    - Lombok
    - Sumbawa
    - Flores
    - Sumba
    - Timor: divided between Indonesian West Timor and the country of East Timor.
- Maluku Islands (Moluccas)
- New Guinea: divided between the Indonesian provinces of Highland Papua, Papua, South Papua, Southwest Papua, Central Papua and West Papua and the country of Papua New Guinea.

== List of islands ==
The following islands are listed by province:

=== Java ===
==== Banten ====
- Panaitan
- Sangiang
- Tinjil
- Umang

==== Central Java ====
- Karimunjawa
- Nusa Kambangan

==== Special Capital Region of Jakarta ====
- Thousand Islands (Kepulauan Seribu)

==== East Java ====
- Bawean
- Gili Iyang Island
- Kangean Islands
- Madura
- Raas
- Nusa Barong
- Raja Island
- Sempu Island

==== West Java ====
- Monitor Lizard Island (Pulau Biawak), Indramayu

=== Sumatra ===
==== Aceh ====
- Banyak Islands
  - Tuangku
- Lasia Island
- Simeulue
- Weh
- Breueh Island

==== North Sumatra ====
- Batu Islands
- Berhala on the Strait of Malacca
- Hinako Islands
- Makole Island
- Masa Island
- Nias Islands
- Samosir, Lake Toba

==== West Sumatra ====
- Mentawai Islands
  - North Pagai
  - Siberut
  - Sipura
  - South Pagai
- Pasumpahan
- Sikuai

==== Bengkulu ====
- Enggano Island

==== Lampung ====
- Child of Krakatoa (Anak Krakatau)
- Legundi
- Sebesi
- Sebuku

==== Riau ====
- Basu Island
- Bengkalis
- Padang
- Rangsang
- Rupat
- Tebing Tinggi Island
- Mendol Island

==== Riau Islands ====
- Natuna Islands (Kepulauan Natuna)
  - Anambas Islands
  - Natuna Besar Islands
  - South Natuna Islands
  - Tambelan Islands
    - Badas Islands
- Riau Archipelago
  - Batam
  - Bintan
  - Bulan
  - Galang
  - Karimun islands
  - Penyengat
    - Great Karimun
    - Little Karimun
  - Kundur
  - Rempang
- Lingga Islands
  - Lingga with nearby islands
  - Singkep with nearby islands

==== Bangka-Belitung Islands ====
- Bangka
- Belitung

=== Kalimantan ===
==== Central Kalimantan ====
- Damar
- Baning Island
- Buaya Island
- Burung Island

==== East Kalimantan ====
- Balabalagan Islands
- Benawa Besar
- Derawan Islands
  - Kakaban

==== North Kalimantan ====
- Bunyu
- Sebatik: divided between Indonesia and Sabah, East Malaysia
- Tarakan

==== South Kalimantan ====
- Laut
- Laut Kecil Islands
- Sebuku

==== West Kalimantan ====
- Bawal
- Galam
- Karimata Islands
  - Karimata
- Maya

=== Sulawesi ===
==== Central Sulawesi ====
- Banggai Islands
  - Banggai
  - Bowokan Islands (Kepulauan Treko)
  - Buka Buka
  - Peleng
- Masoni Island
- Simatang Island
- Togian Islands
  - Togian
  - Tolitoli

==== North Sulawesi ====
- Bangka
- Bunaken
- Lembeh
- Manado Tua
- Nain
- Sangihe Islands
  - Nanipa
  - Bukide
  - Sangir Besar
  - Siau
  - Tagulandang
- Talaud Islands
  - Kabaruan
  - Karakelang
  - Salibabu
- Talise

==== South Sulawesi ====
- Pabbiring Islands
- Sabalana Islands
- Selayar Islands
  - Selayar Island
- Takabonerate Islands
- Tengah Islands

==== Southeast Sulawesi ====
- Buton
- Kabaena
- Muna
- Tukangbesi Islands
  - Wakatobi
    - Wangiwangi
- Wowoni

=== Lesser Sunda Islands ===
==== Bali ====
- Bali
- Menjangan Island
- Nusa Lembongan
- Nusa Penida
- Serangan Island
- Nusa Ceningan

==== East Nusa Tenggara ====
- Alor Islands
  - Alor
  - Batang
  - Buaya
  - Kambing
  - Kangge
  - Kepa
  - Lapang
  - Pantar
  - Pura
  - Rusa
  - Sika
  - Tereweng
  - Ternate (Little Pura)
- Flores
  - Babi Island
  - Mules Island
- Komodo
  - Gili Lawadarat
  - Gili Lawalaut
  - Mangiatan Island
  - Makasar Island
    - Taka Makasar
  - Mauwang Island
  - Pararambah Island
  - Siaba Besar Island
    - Siaba Kecil Island
    - Mangiatan Island
    - Tatawa Island
      - Tukoh Pemaroh
    - Pararambah Island
- Padar Island
  - Batubilah Island
  - Padar Kecil Island
- Palu Island
- Pemana Islands
- Rinca
  - Gili Motang
  - Golo Mori
  - Muang Island
  - Rohbong Island
    - Tukoh Gagak
    - Tukoh Rohbongkoe
  - Papagaran Besar Island
    - Papagaran Kecil Island
    - Batu Island
    - Mole Island
  - Pengah Besar Island
    - Pengah Kecil Island
    - Batupengah Island
- Rote Island
- Savu
- Solor Islands
  - Adonara
  - Lembata
  - Solor
- Sumba
  - Halura Island
- Timor, divided between Indonesia (West Timor) and the independent nation of East Timor
  - Semau Island

==== West Nusa Tenggara ====
- Gili Islands
  - Gili Air
  - Gili Trawangan
  - Gili Meno
- Banta Island
- Gili Biaha
- Gili Mimpang
- Gili Selang
- Gili Tepekong
- Lombok
- Medang Island
- Moyo Island
- Menjangan Island
- Sangeang
- Satonda
- Sumbawa

=== Maluku Islands ===
==== Maluku ====
- Aru Islands
  - Enu
  - Kobroor
  - Maikoor
  - Trangan
  - Wokam
- Babar
- Banda
- Barat Daya Islands
  - Damer
  - Liran
  - Romang
  - Wetar
- Boano
- Buru
- Gorong archipelago
- Kai Islands
- Kelang
- Leti Islands
  - Lakor
  - Leti
  - Moa
- Manipa
- Nusa Laut
- Seram
  - Ambon
  - Osi
  - Saparua
- Tanimbar Islands
  - Selaru
  - Yamdena
- Small volcanic islands in Banda Sea
- Tayandu Islands (Kepulauan Tayando)
- Watubela archipelago

==== North Maluku ====
- Bacan, with nearby islands:
  - Kasiruta
  - Mandioli
  - Muari
- Erà Islands
- Halmahera, with nearby islands:
  - Makian
  - Ternate
  - Tidore
  - Hiri
  - Mare
  - Maitara
  - Kayoa
  - Laluin
  - Moti
  - Rau
  - Kakara
  - Meti
  - Medi
  - Tagalaya
  - Cumo
  - Widi Islands
- Morotai, with nearby islands:
  - Rau
- Obi Islands, which include:
  - Bisa
  - Gomumu
  - Obi
  - Obilatu
  - Tobalai
- Sula Islands

=== Western New Guinea ===
Islands near the Indonesian half of New Guinea island.

==== West Papua ====
- Asia Island
- Karas
- Semai

==== Southwest Papua ====
- Ayu Islands
  - Palau Ayu
  - Palau Reni
- Raja Ampat Islands
  - Salawati
  - Batanta
  - Boo Islands
  - Fam Islands
  - Misool
  - Waigeo
    - Gam
    - Kawe

==== Papua ====
- Biak Islands
  - Biak
  - Mios Num
  - Numfor
  - Supiori
  - Yapen

==== South Papua ====
- Komoran
- Yos Sudarso
- Marauke

== See also ==
- Malay archipelago
- Maritime Southeast Asia
- List of Indonesian islands by area
- List of Indonesian islands by population
- List of outlying islands of Indonesia, an officially designated list of islands that are close to or divided by another country

== Bibliography ==
- "Indonesia counts its islands before it's too late". Antara. 17 May 2007.
