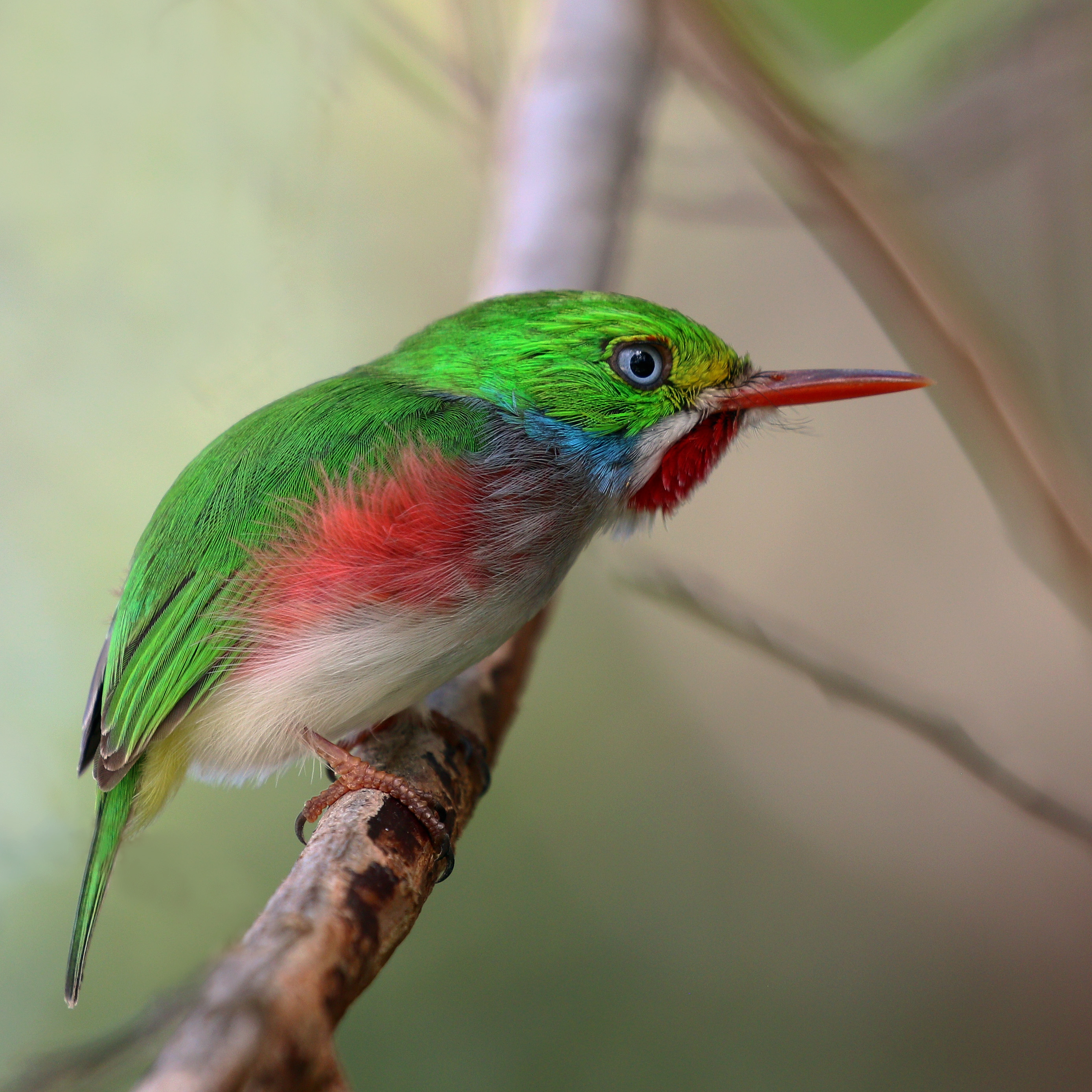
- on Cayo Guillermo

Conservation status
- Least Concern (IUCN 3.1)

Scientific classification
- Kingdom: Animalia
- Phylum: Chordata
- Class: Aves
- Order: Coraciiformes
- Family: Todidae
- Genus: Todus
- Species: T. multicolor

Binomial name
- Todus multicolor Gould, 1837

= Cuban tody =

Species of bird

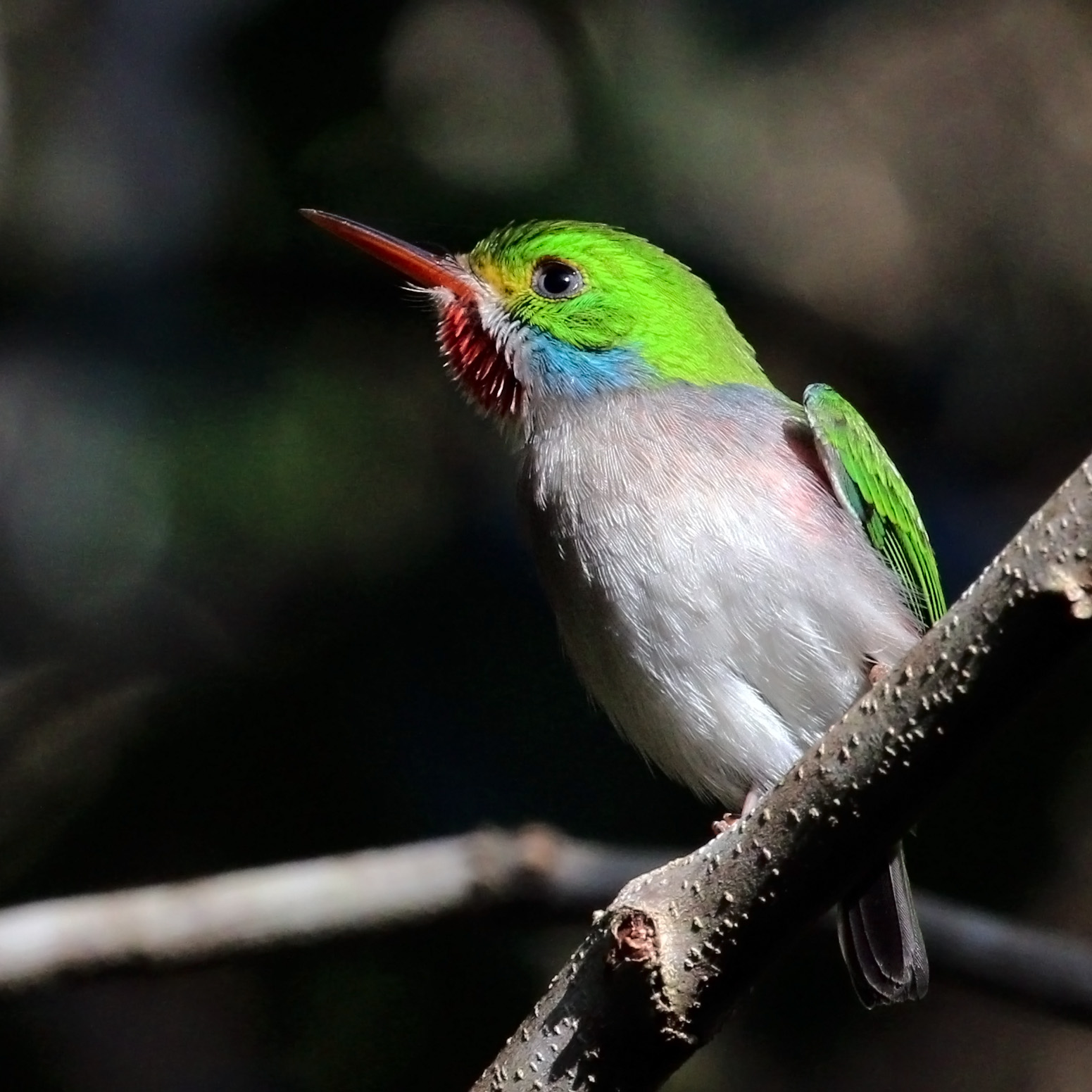
juvenile

The Cuban tody (Todus multicolor) is a bird species in the family Todidae that is restricted to Cuba and the adjacent islands.

== Description ==
The species is characterized by small size with a length of 11 cm (4.3 in) and weighing 5.9 g (0.21 oz). It has a large head relative to body size, and a thin, flat bill. Similar to other todies, the coloration of the Cuban Tody includes an iridescent green dorsum, pale whitish-grey underparts, and red highlights. This species is distinguished by its pink flanks, red throat, yellow lores, and blue ear-patch. The bill is bicolored: black on the top and red on the bottom.

== Distribution and habitat ==
The Cuban tody is a year-round resident of only portions of Cuba and the islands just off the Cuban coast. Analysis of song variation suggests that the species is structured into two populations, corresponding to eastern and western Cuba.

The tody, like many resident Cuban bird species, is a habitat generalist. It is known to live in dry lowlands, evergreen forests, coastal vegetation, and near streams and rivers. Cuban toadies may be difficult to see; Vaurie reported, "Only one seen at the Cape, in dense underbrush, but several heard."

== Behaviour ==
They often are seen in pairs. When perched, they sometimes repeat a peculiar short "tot-tot-tot-tot", but their most characteristic call is a soft "pprreeee-pprreeee" (which is the origin of its Cuban common name, 'Pedorrera'). Its wings produce a whirring sound that is used during display flights.

=== Breeding ===
Nests consist of a tunnel about 30 cm (12 in) long in a clay embankment, with a terminal chamber, although sometimes they use a rotten trunk or tree cavity. They cover the walls of the tunnel and the egg chamber with a thick glue-like substance mixed with grass, lichen, algae, small feathers, and other materials. Three or four eggs are laid and they are incubated by both parents.

=== Feeding ===
The diet of the Cuban tody is dominated by insects, but also may include small fruits, small lizards, and spiders. Although the ecology of these birds has been little-studied, they are known to participate in mixed-species flocks. They are also prey used as food items: predators include both the mongoose and humans in poor areas.

== See also ==
- Jamaican tody
- Narrow-billed tody
- Broad-billed tody
- Puerto Rican tody
