= Asia Islands =

Island group in Indonesia

- Asia Islands (upper right corner) within the Raja Ampat Archipelago

- Location in Southwest Papua Location in Western New Guinea

Geography
- Coordinates: 1°04′N 131°15′E

The Asia Islands (Indonesian: Kepulauan Asia) are a group of three small islands in the open sea north of the Raja Ampat Archipelago of eastern Indonesia. They are located 117 kilometres (73 mi) north of the island of Waigeo, around 50 kilometres (31 mi) north of the last of the Ayu Islands (both in the Raja Ampat Achipelago), and 210 kilometres (130 mi) south of the island of Tobi in Palau. The individual islands (in descending order of size, and running from north to south) are known as Fani, Igi and Miarin (also spelled Miaren). Fani, known locally as Fangkawab, covers about 689 hectares. It is one of 111 outermost small islands designated by the Indonesian government under Presidential Decree No. 6 of 2017, and marks Indonesia's maritime border with Palau. On the largest island of Fani, there is a pier and a small settlement, intermittently inhabited by visitors from Reni Island and Rutum Island to the south. Administratively the Asia Islands are part of the Ayau Islands (Kepulauan Ayau) District of the Raja Ampat Regency of the province of Southwest Papua.
