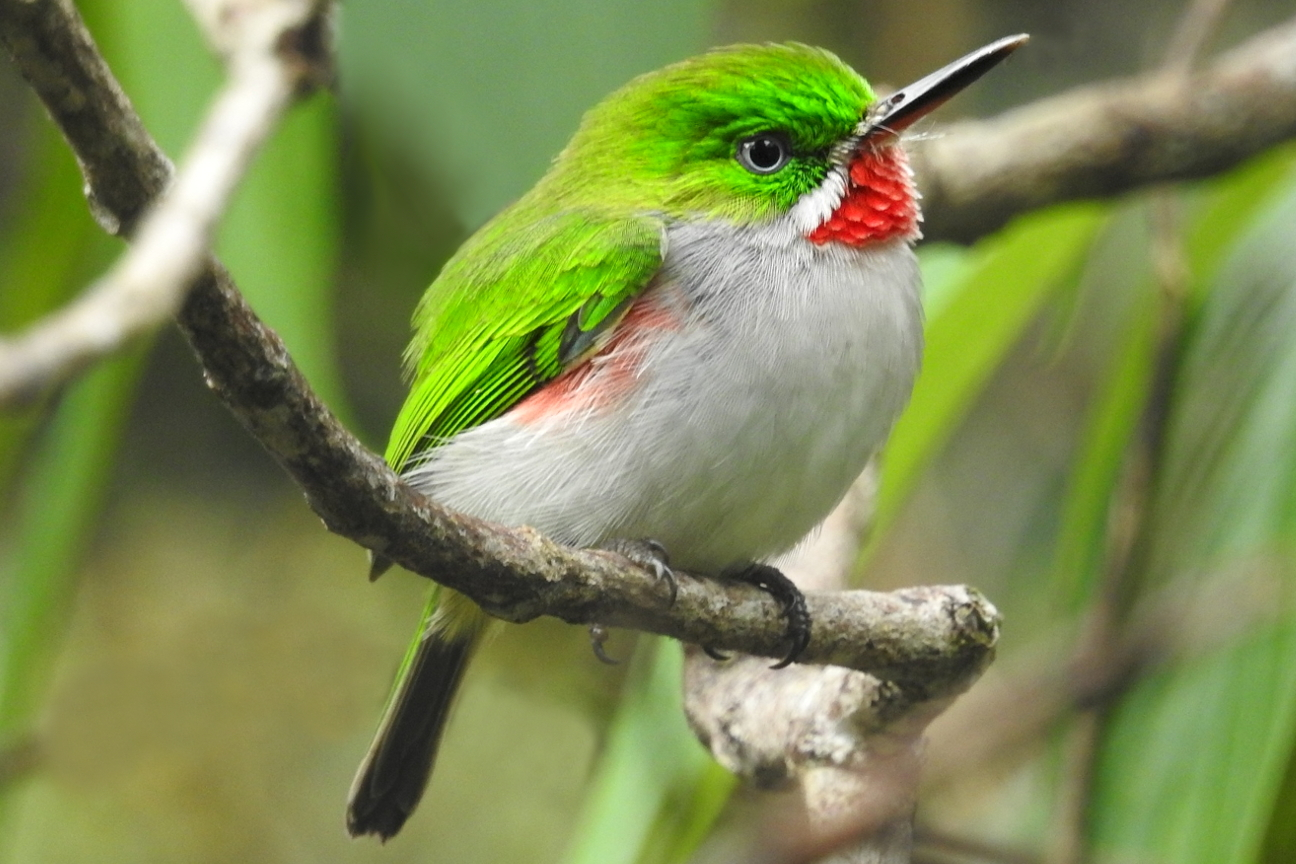

Conservation status
- Least Concern (IUCN 3.1)

Scientific classification
- Kingdom: Animalia
- Phylum: Chordata
- Class: Aves
- Order: Coraciiformes
- Family: Todidae
- Genus: Todus
- Species: T. angustirostris

Binomial name
- Todus angustirostris Lafresnaye, 1851

= Narrow-billed tody =

Species of bird endemic to Hispaniola

The narrow-billed tody (Todus angustirostris) is a species of bird in the family Todidae. It is one of two Todus species endemic to Hispaniola, a Caribbean island shared by the Dominican Republic and Haiti.

== Taxonomy and systematics ==
The narrow-billed tody and the other Hispaniolan tody, the broad-billed (T. subulatus), were originally thought to share a recent common ancestor, because the other three todies are each the only one on different islands. However, phylogenetic analysis suggests that the narrow-billed tody descended from the Cuban tody (T. multicolor) and the broad-billed tody descended from the Puerto Rican tody (T. mexicanus). The separation between the lineages occurred two to three million years ago, before either ancestor colonized Hispaniola.

== Description ==
All five members of genus Todus are very small, chunky, and short tailed. The narrow-billed tody weighs about 7.5 g (0.26 oz). Its upperparts are bright green, becoming almost emerald around the white eyes. A white malar stripe separates the face from the carmine red chin and throat. The sides of the neck and breast are deep lead gray; the rest of the breast and the belly are white. The flanks are geranium pink to red. The upperside of the wing is bright green and much of the underwing is sulphur yellow. Its maxilla is black and the mandible red, both with darker tips.

== Distribution and habitat ==
The narrow-billed tody is resident on Hispaniola and occurs in both countries of the island. It mostly inhabits dense wet jungle and forest between elevations of 900 and 2,400 m (3,000 and 7,900 ft). It is also found locally at lower elevations, where it overlaps the distribution of the broad-billed tody.

== Behavior ==
=== Feeding ===
The narrow-billed tody's diet is almost entirely insects; at least 49 families of them have been identified. Curiously, they do not prey on larger butterflies or caterpillars, which are part of the broad-billed tody's diet. The narrow-billed tody tends to forage high in the forest canopy, especially when part of a mixed-species foraging flock. They also feed low down among coffee bushes in plantations.

=== Breeding ===
The narrow-billed tody makes display flights without vocalizations, in a manner similar to those of others of its order, but includes wing rattling that others do not. Both sexes excavate a nest burrow about 30 cm (12 in) deep in an earthen bank. The clutch size ranges from one to four glossy white eggs. Usually one clutch is laid per season, between April and July. Both sexes incubate the eggs. Pairs separate after the young fledge and do not necessarily mate with each other the next year.

=== Vocalization ===
A characteristic narrow-billed tody vocalization is "a two note call, described as chip-chee, accented on the second syllable." They also make a short chatter.

== Status ==
The IUCN originally in 1988 assessed the narrow-billed tody as Near Threatened, but since 2004 has rated it as being of Least Concern. However, its population has not been quantified and is believed to be decreasing due to habitat loss.
