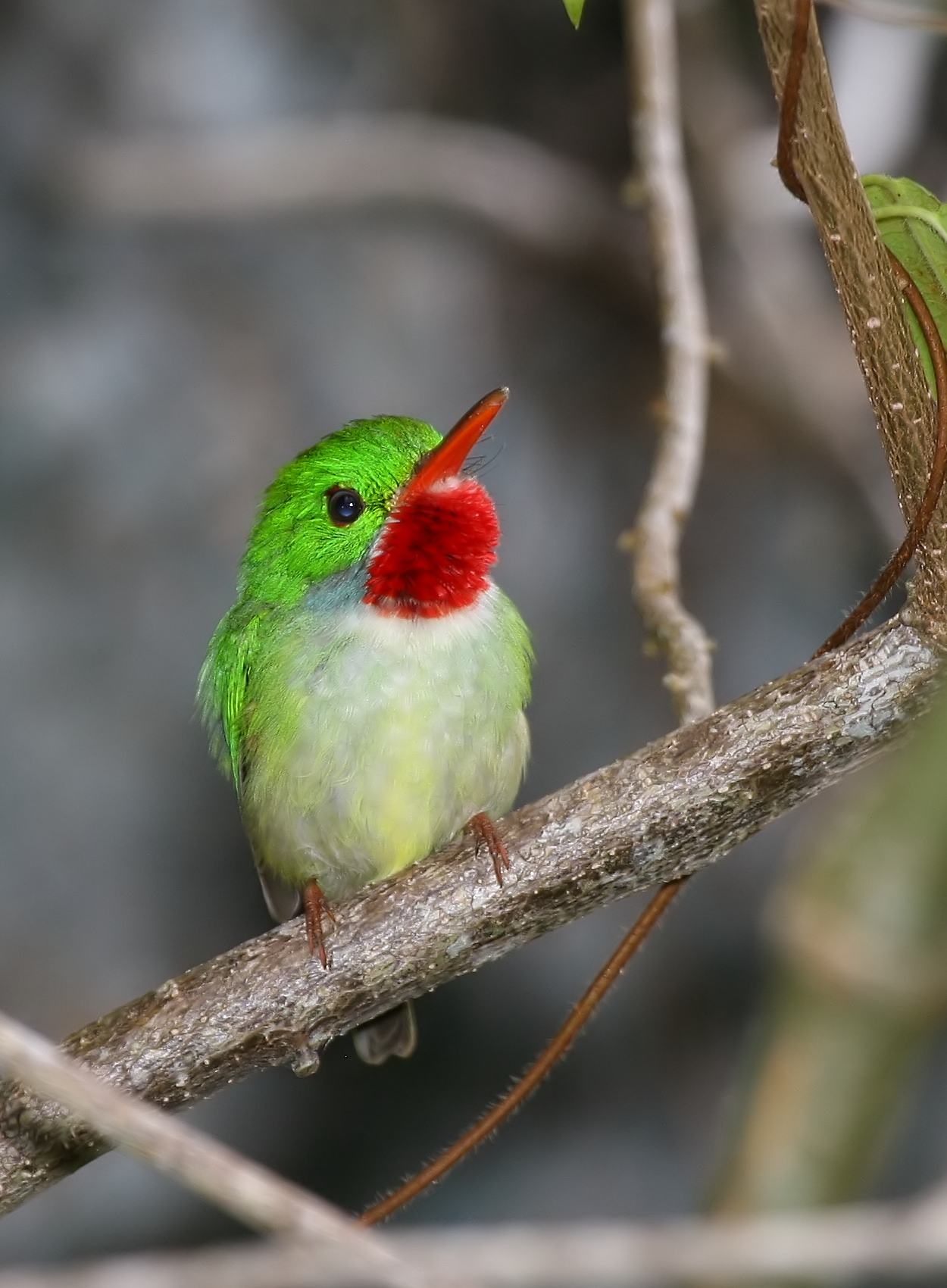
- Jamaican tody (Todus todus)

Scientific classification
- Kingdom: Animalia
- Phylum: Chordata
- Class: Aves
- Order: Coraciiformes
- Family: Todidae
- Genus: Todus; Brisson, 1760

Type species
- Alcedo todus Linnaeus, 1758

Species
- See text
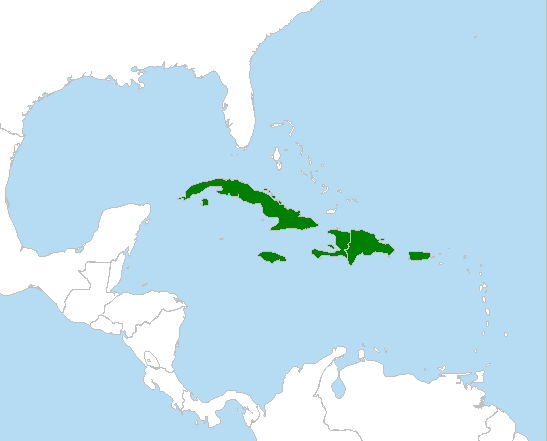
- Global range (in green)

= Todus =

Genus of birds

Todus is a genus of birds found in the Caribbean. It is the only genus within the todies family Todidae. The five species are small birds of the forests of the Greater Antilles: Puerto Rico, Jamaica, and Cuba, with adjacent islands, have one species each, and Hispaniola has two, the broad-billed tody in the lowlands (including Gonâve Island) and the narrow-billed tody in the highlands.

== Taxonomy and systematics ==
The genus Todus was introduced by the French zoologist Mathurin Jacques Brisson in 1760 with the Jamaican tody (Todus todus) as the type species. Todus is a Latin word for a small bird mentioned by the Roman playwright Plautus and the grammarian Sextus Pompeius Festus. This name had earlier been used for the Jamaican tody by the Irish physician Patrick Browne in his book The Civil and Natural History of Jamaica that was published in 1756.

=== Extant species ===
Five species are recognized:

Image	Scientific name	Common name	Distribution
	Todus multicolor	Cuban tody	Cuba
	Todus subulatus	Broad-billed tody	Hispaniola
	Todus angustirostris	Narrow-billed tody	Haiti and the Dominican Republic.
	Todus todus	Jamaican tody	Jamaica
	Todus mexicanus	Puerto Rican tody	Puerto Rico

=== Former species ===
- Emperor fairywren (as Todus cyanocephalus)
- Leaden flycatcher (as Todus rubecula)

== Description ==
Todies range in weight from 5 to 7 g and in length from 10 to 11.5 cm. They have colourful plumage and resemble kingfishers in their general shape. They have green heads, backs and wings, red throats (absent in immature Puerto Rican, broad-billed, and narrow-billed Todies) with a white and blue-grey stripe on each side, and yellow undertail coverts; the colour of the rest of the undersides is pale and varies according to species. The irises are pale grey. They have long, flattened bills (as do many flycatching birds) with serrated edges; the upper mandible is black and the lower is red with a little black. The legs, and especially the feet, are small. Todies are highly vocal, except that the Jamaican tody seldom calls in the non-breeding season (August to November); they give simple, unmusical buzzing notes, beeps, and guttural rattles, puffing their throats out with every call. Their wings produce a "strange, whirring rattle", though mostly when courting or defending territory in the Puerto Rican tody.

== Behaviour and ecology ==
Todies are generally sedentary; the longest single flight known for the broad-billed tody is 40 m. Their activity is greatest in the morning when sunny weather follows rain, and in March and September.

=== Breeding ===
Like most of the Coraciiformes, todies nest in tunnels, which they dig with their beaks and feet in steep banks or rotten tree trunks. The tunnel is 30 cm long in the Cuban and narrow-billed Todies, 30 to 60 cm in the broad-billed tody, and ends in a nest chamber, generally not reused. They lay about four round white eggs in the chamber. Both parents incubate but are surprisingly inattentive to the eggs. The young are altricial and stay in the nest until they can fly. Both parents also care for the nestlings, much more attentively; they may feed each chick up to 140 times per day, the highest rate known among birds.

=== Food and feeding ===
Todies eat small prey such as insects and lizards. Insects, particularly grasshoppers, crickets, beetles, bugs, butterflies, bees, wasps, and ants, form the greater part of the diet. Spiders and millipedes may also be taken, as is a small amount of fruit (2% of the diet). Todies typically sit on a low, small branch, singly or in pairs, keeping still or stepping or hopping sideways. When they see prey moving on the lower surface of a leaf, they fly a short distance (averaging 2.2 m in the broad-billed tody and 1.0 m in the Puerto Rican tody), diagonally upward to glean it. They may also take prey from the ground, occasionally chasing it with a few hops.
