= Tengah =

Tengah is an Indonesian and Malay word meaning "central" or "middle". It can be found in topography, e.g.

- Jawa Tengah
- Kalimantan Tengah
- Papua Tengah
- Sulawesi Tengah
- Tengah Islands or Central Archipelago.

== Other usages ==
- Tengah, Singapore
- Tengah Air Base
- Tengah MRT station
