= Sempu =

Sempu may refer to:

- Sempu (island), an island
- Mount Sempu, a volcano
