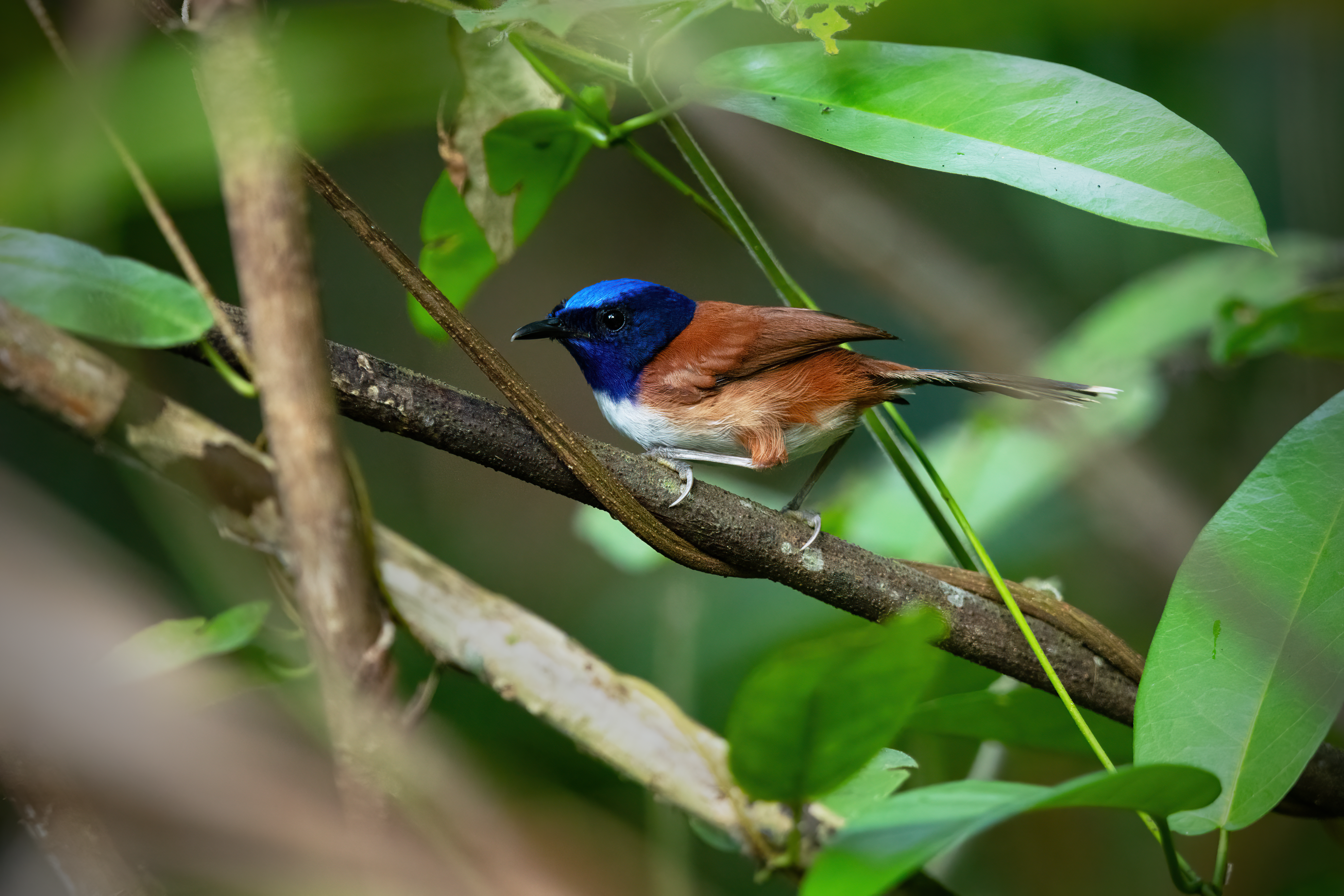
- Female M. c. bonapartii
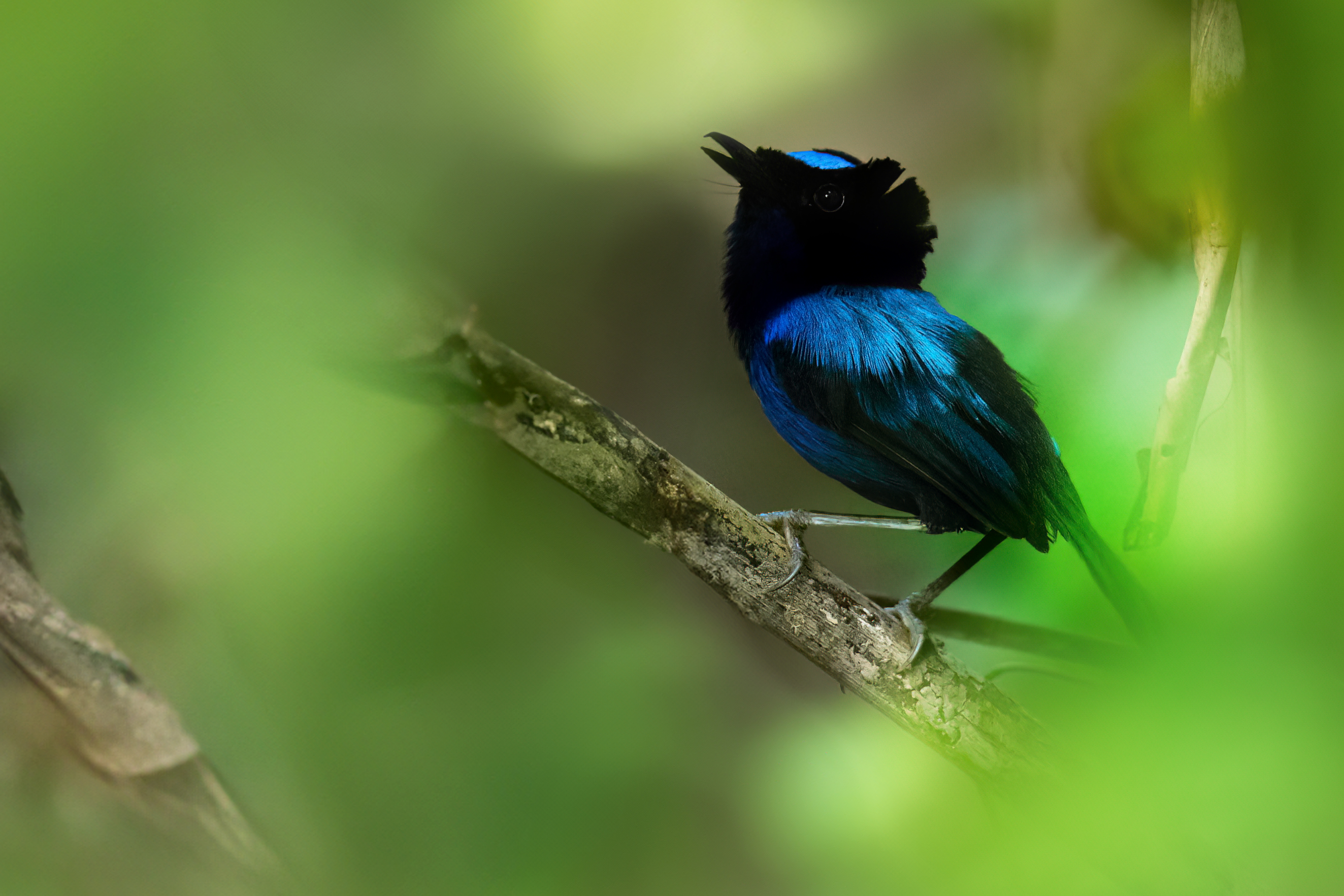
- Male M. c. bonapartii

Conservation status
- Least Concern (IUCN 3.1)

Scientific classification
- Kingdom: Animalia
- Phylum: Chordata
- Class: Aves
- Order: Passeriformes
- Family: Maluridae
- Genus: Malurus
- Species: M. cyanocephalus

Binomial name
- Malurus cyanocephalus (Quoy & Gaimard, 1832)

Synonyms
- Todus cyanocephalus; Todopsis cyanocephala

= Emperor fairywren =

Species of bird

The emperor fairywren (Malurus cyanocephalus) is a species of bird in the Australasian wren family, Maluridae. It is found in New Guinea in its natural habitat of subtropical or tropical moist lowland forests. It is the largest species of fairywren. It is highly sexually dimorphic. Males have a blue and black plumage, with the females having blue and black plumage only on their heads, with the rest of the body being coloured a rusty brown and having a black tail tipped with white. There are 3 recognized subspecies of the emperor fairywren, one from north and northwestern New Guinea, one from Biak Island, and one from south New Guinea and the Aru Islands.

Like other fairywrens, the emperor fairywren is socially monogamous and sexually promiscuous, and is a cooperative breeder. Its nests are made of leaves, ferns, and moss, and laced in bushes at an elevation. Its diet is mostly composed of insects. Foraging occurs in family groups.

== Taxonomy and systematics ==
The emperor fairywren was originally described by Jean Quoy and Joseph Gaimard in 1830 based on specimens collected by them in northwestern New Guinea in 1827 on a voyage of the Astrolabe. They mistook the specimens as todies, and described the species as Todus cyanocephalus. In 1854, Charles Lucien Bonaparte recognised that the species was not a tody, and created the genus Todopsis, making the emperor fairywren its type species. In 1859, George Gray described Todopsis bonapartii as a species on the basis of specimens from the Aru Islands, while Adolf Meyer described Todopsis mysorensis on the basis of specimens from Biak in 1874. However, Walter Rothschild and Ernst Hartert included them as subspecies of T. cyanocephalus, while adding T. c. dohertyi as a fourth subspecies from northern New Guinea on the basis of differences in the colour of the females. In 1982, Richard Schodde moved the emperor fairywren from Todopsis to Malurus and included dohertyi as a part of M. c. cyanocephalus.

The generic name Malurus is from the Greek malos (soft) and oura (tail), while the specific epithet comes from the Greek kuanos (dark blue) and kephalos (headed). Alternate names include the blue fairywren, blue wren-warbler, emperor wren, imperial fairywren, imperial wren, and New Guinea blue-wren.

The emperor fairywren is one of 12 species in the genus Malurus. Within the genus, it is variously said to be most closely related to the chestnut-shouldered wrens and a group comprising the bi-colored and blue wrens. Like other fairywrens, the emperor fairywren is not related to the true wrens. The fairywrens were previously classified in the Muscicapidae and the Sylviidae before being put in the newly established Maluridae in 1975. DNA evidence has shown the Maluridae to be most closely related to the Meliphagidae and the Pardalotidae in the superfamily Meliphagoidea.

=== Subspecies ===
Three subspecies of the emperor fairywren are recognized:

- M. c. cyanocephalus (Quoy & Gaimard, 1830): It is the nominate subspecies, and is found in north-western and northern New Guinea.
- M. c. mysorensis (Meyer, AB, 1874): It was originally described as a separate species in the genus Todopsis. It is found on Biak (off north-western New Guinea). Its crown tends to be slightly lighter than that of the nominate subspecies.
- M. c. bonapartii (Gray, GR, 1859): It was originally described as a separate species in the genus Todopsis. It is found in southern New Guinea and Aru Islands. It is slightly darker than the other two subspecies.

== Description ==
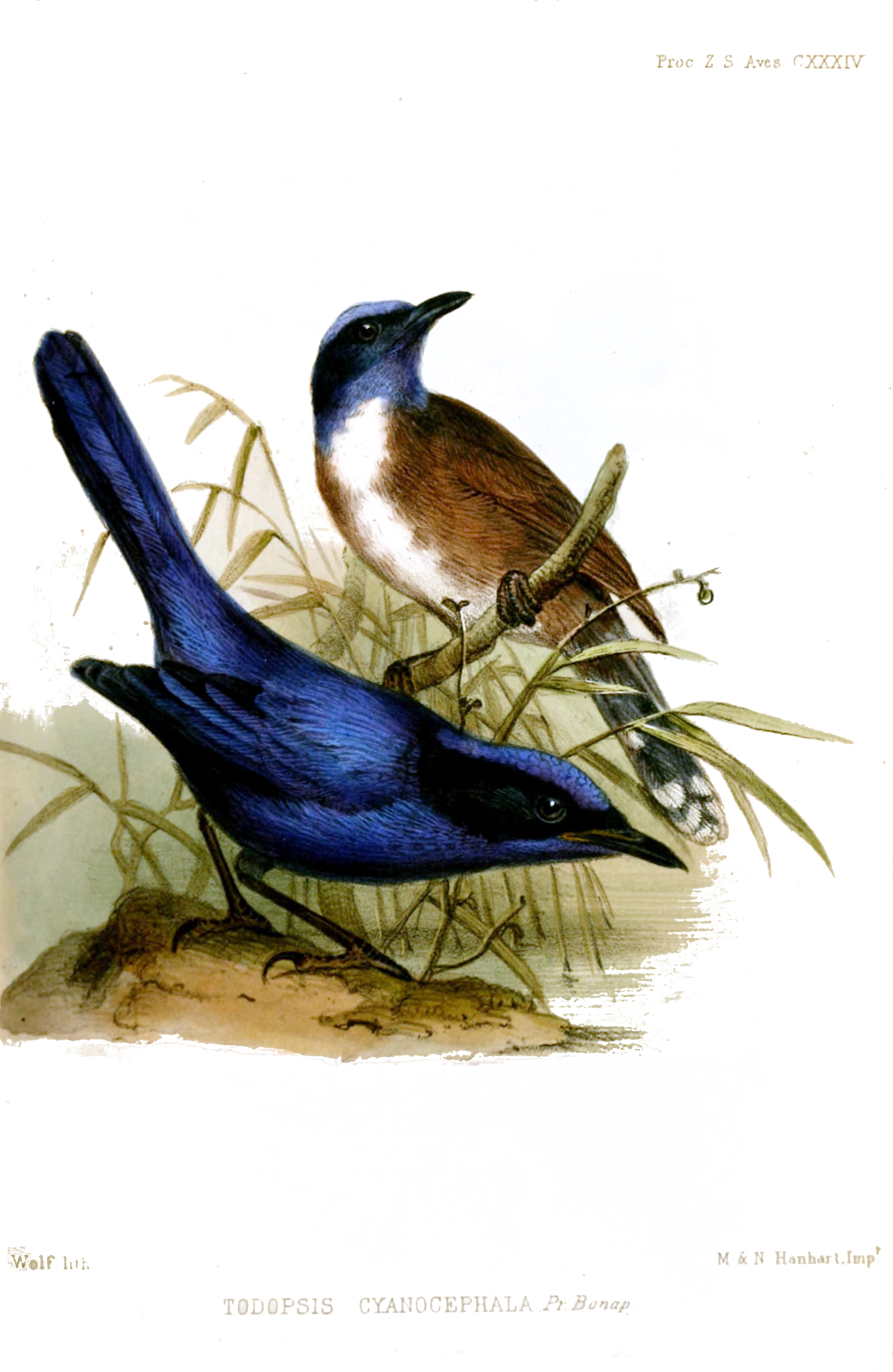
A painting of a male and female emperor fairywren.

It is the largest fairywren, being 13–16 cm (5.1–6.3 in) long and weighing 12–17 g (0.42–0.60 oz). Males of the nominate race have light royal blue crowns. The forehead, lores, and the side of the head up till the narrow collar is black. The upper back, along with the scapulars and uppertail-coverts is a deep turquoise-blue, with the lower back being blue-black. The upperwing and the tail are blackish-blue with tinges of blue, and the throats and underparts are a navy blue in color. It has dark brown eyes, black bill, and dark grey-brown legs. Females of the nominate race have a head that looks similar to the male, but have chestnut upperparts, white underparts, deep blue throats, and a black tail with whitish tips. They also have lighter and more mid-brown legs, along with duller crowns that are deeper in colour. Juveniles look like females, but have a dusky head, rusty brown upperparts, and entirely white underparts. M. c. mysorensis differs slightly in appearance with its crown being cobalt blue instead of royal blue, and M. c. bonapartii is slightly darker than the nominate race.

=== Vocalisations ===
Its songs are a reel that are preceded and followed by sets of 3 notes. This call is frequently given by groups of emperor fairywrens while they are foraging. The contact calls for the bird are "tst-tst-tst-tst", with the alarm call being "tschik".

== Distribution and habitat ==
It is found on New Guinea and the Aru Islands. It is found in tropical lowland, forests, wetlands, and degraded former forests. They inhabit dense secondary growth that occurs at the edges of forest, along with forest openings, riversides, roadsides and overgrown gardens. They are not as affected by habitat disturbance and appear to like disturbed habitats like gardens and parks.

== Behaviour and ecology ==
=== Diet ===
The emperor fairywren feeds mainly on arthropods. They eat beetles, bugs, moths, grasshoppers, and spiders. Foraging is conducted in noisy family groups, with the insects foraged from leaves, palm fronds and branches within 1 m (3.3 ft) of the ground.

=== Reproduction ===
Little is known about the breeding habits of the emperor fairywren, but as juveniles have been recorded from March-December, it probably breeds throughout the year. They are socially monogamous but sexually promiscuous, remaining paired throughout the year. It is a cooperative breeder, having helpers, most frequently former chicks, in pairs or small groups to help raise young.

The only observed nest was gourd-shaped with a side entrance, placed 1 m (3.3 ft) off the ground in a bush and containing 4 young. The nest was made out of strips of fern and leaves which were woven together with moss.
