= Palaeotodus =

Palaeotodus Temporal range: 33.9–28.4 Ma Lower Oligocene

Scientific classification
- Kingdom: Animalia
- Phylum: Chordata
- Class: Aves
- Order: Coraciiformes
- Family: Todidae
- Genus: †Palaeotodus; Olson, 1976

Species
- see text

Extinct genus of birds

Palaeotodus is an extinct genus of todies in the family Todidae. The genus has at least three species known from fossils found in France and the American state of Wyoming. They were larger than modern todies, and closer in size to the modern living tody motmot.

== Species ==
The following species have been classified within the genus:

- †Palaeotodus emryi - Olson, 1976: Oligocene fossils found in Wyoming (United States). These remains of Palaeotodus emryi indicate a larger size and proportionally larger wings than those of modern todies.
- †Palaeotodus escampsiensis - Mourer-Chauviré, 1985: Upper Eocene fossils found in France.
- †Palaeotodus itardiensis - Mourer-Chauviré, 1985: Lower Oligocene fossils found in France.
