= Pulau Kanobe =

- Location within Western New Guinea
- Coordinates: 0°30′1″N 131°7′26″E
- Country: Indonesia
- Province: Southwest Papua
- Time zone: UTC+09:00 (Eastern Indonesian Time)

Pulau Kanobe
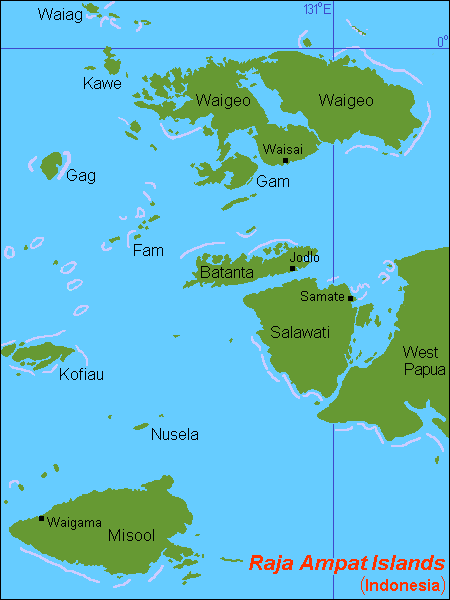
- Location of Pulau Kanobe listed as Ayau (Ayau Islands) in the Raja Ampat Islands located in the top right corner of the map
- Interactive map of Pulau Kanobe

Geography
- Location: South East Asia
- Coordinates: 0°22′N 131°02′E
- Archipelago: Ayu Islands
- Total islands: 5 (two uninhabited)
- Major islands: Pulau Ayau, Pulau Reni, Pulau Kanobe
- Province: Southwest Papua

Demographics
- Ethnic groups: Melanesians, Papuans, Austronesians

Pulau Kanobe is a small Indonesian island located in the Ayu Archipelago above the northern tip of the Waigeo Islands.

Pulau Reni is part of the Raja Ampat Regency in the Southwest Papua Province of Indonesia.

Pulau Ayau and Pulau Reni are two other small inhabited islands near Pulau Kanobe.

Access to the island is limited to small boats due to the reefs and the small size of the island.

== World War II ==
Pulau Reni and all the islands in the Ayau Archipelago were occupied by the Empire of Japan during World War II from 1942 until the end of the war in 1945.
