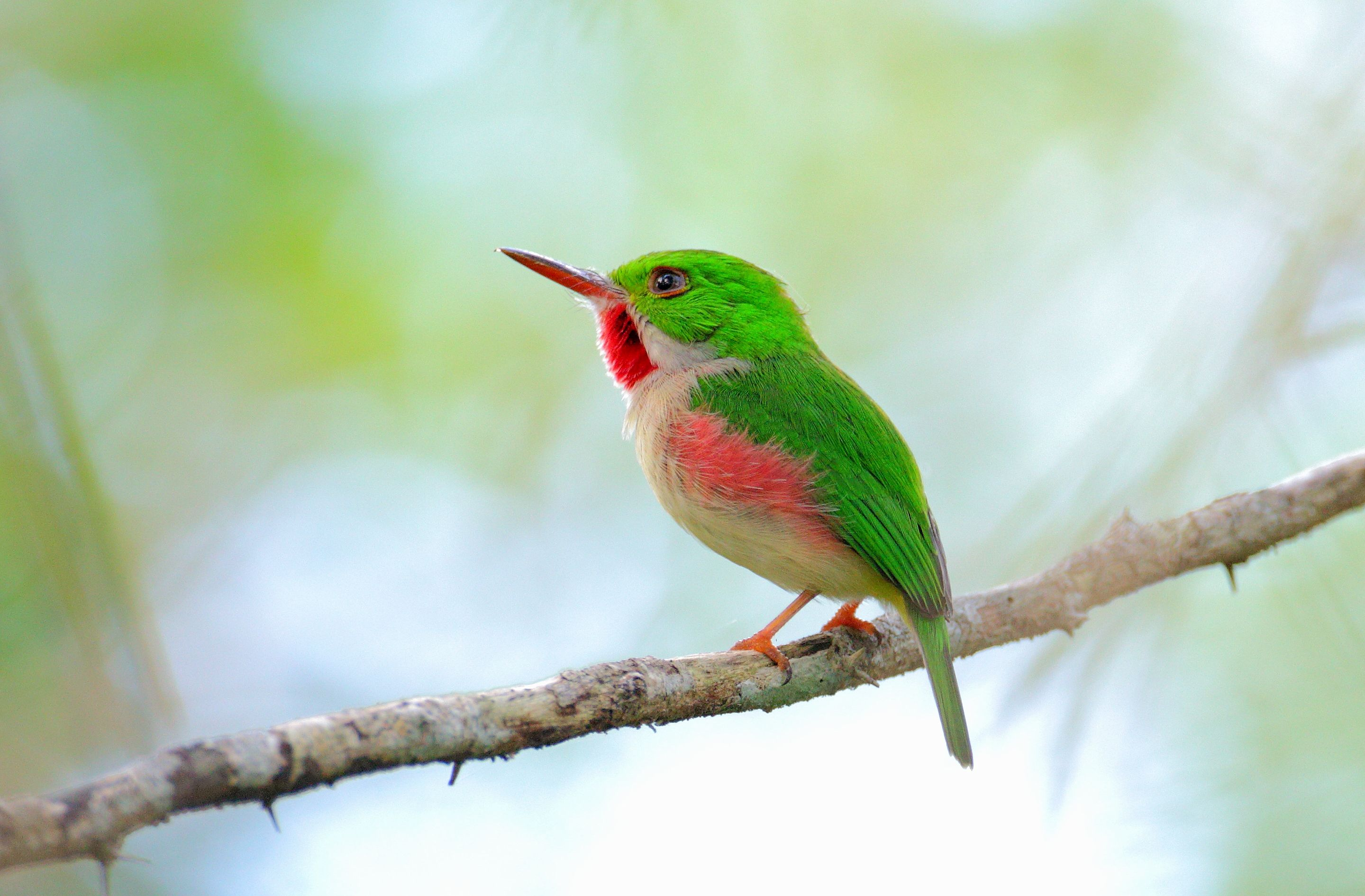

Conservation status
- Least Concern (IUCN 3.1)

Scientific classification
- Kingdom: Animalia
- Phylum: Chordata
- Class: Aves
- Order: Coraciiformes
- Family: Todidae
- Genus: Todus
- Species: T. subulatus

Binomial name
- Todus subulatus G.R. Gray, 1847

= Broad-billed tody =

Species of bird endemic to Hispaniola

The broad-billed tody (Todus subulatus) is a species of bird in the family Todidae, and one of two Todus species found on Hispaniola, along with the narrow-billed tody. They are small insectivorous birds, characterized by their bright green feathers, pink flanks and red throats.

They occur at elevations lower than 1700 meters and prefer drier habitats to that of wet rainforests. The broad-billed tody does not migrate and occupies very small territories.

These birds are often seen hopping along perches, foraging for insects with their long bills among the leaves. Broad-billed todies have two principle vocalizations, the first being their general call which sounds like a whistle and the second call sounding more trilly, when they encounter a predator. They can also create a rattling noise by running wind through their feathers.

Their breeding season runs from April to July, in which the female will lay one clutch of eggs, containing one to four eggs. The nestlings take three weeks to mature into juveniles and then fly off to establish their own territory. Broad-billed todies are not a threatened species, and are therefore of least concern to the International Union for the Conservation of Nature (IUNC).

== Taxonomy and systematics ==
The broad-billed tody is one of five species in the genus Todus, which is the only genus in the monotypic family Todidae. Originally, it was thought that broad-billed and narrow-billed todies shared a common ancestor and then split into two species, as they are the only tody species that share an island. However, mitochondrial DNA analysis has shown that the broad-billed tody descended from the Puerto Rican tody, while the narrow-billed tody descended from the Cuban tody, which was native to the island first. The ancestors of the broad-billed tody migrated to the island two to three million years ago, meaning they have always been distinct species. There has also been a question about where to place the todies among other taxonomic groups, due to their similarities with other birds, such as the nightjars, the trogons, the puffbirds, among others. In 1790, the genus Todus was established, to separate the todies from the kingfishers of genus Alcedo, with the order "Todiformes" being proposed in 1882 but rejected. Currently, in combination with DNA, geographical and evolutionary analysis, it is firmly believed that todies belong to the order Coraciiformes.

== Description ==
The broad-billed tody is a small, rotund bird with a short tail, distinctive bright green feathers on its back, head and wings, as well as a plain white breast tinged with yellow. Additionally, it has a striking red throat, pale pink flanks, slate-colored irises and bright yellow on its underside, where its body meets its tail. The broad-billed tody has the widest bill of the tody family, measuring 0.6 centimeters wide and 2.1 centimeters long, the upper part of which is black, while its lower part is entirely red. The broad-billed tody has short, rounded feathers that are not streamlined for efficient flight. Its body measures 11.5 centimeters tall and it weighs approximately 7.5 grams, making it the largest bird in the genus Todus. The females and males are nearly indistinguishable, though the juveniles can be distinguished by the absence of the red throat, instead having pale yellow throats somewhat tinged with red, as well as shorter bills and gray-streaked breasts. Tody eggs are the smallest eggs of the Coraciiformes, measuring 1.6 centimeters by 1.4 centimeters and weighing approximately 1.4 grams. The eggs are glossy white, with no markings, though they often pick up a reddish tint from dirt stains, as well as a rosy tinge from the large orange/red yolk inside, necessary to sustain their unusually long incubation time.

== Habitat and distribution ==
The broad-billed tody is endemic to the island of Hispaniola, which is split between Dominican Republic and Haiti. It shares the island with the narrow-billed tody, although the two species are geographically separated for much of the island, excluding specific pine forests and mangroves, where the two species can be seen flocking together. The broad-billed tody inhabits primarily low elevations, ranging from sea level to 1700 meters, and is also more prevalent in the Dominican Republic than Haiti. It prefers arid habitats containing low-land scrubs, sub-desert habitats with plentiful cacti and agave, as well as shaded coffee plantations and pine forests. Despite being a tropical bird, it is rarely seen in dense rainforest and dislikes wet conditions. The broad-billed tody is not a migratory species, and is instead completely sedentary. During the breeding season, the breeding pair will remain within the same territory for the duration of the season, though during the non-breeding months, the tody will forage slightly further from its home range and may join a mixed flock with the narrow-billed tody temporarily. When the breeding season begins again, the tody will stay close to its original territory and maintain it year to year. The juveniles also do not travel far once they leave the next. The first suitable territory that they will claim will be only a few kilometers away from their original home.

== Behavior and ecology ==
=== Reproduction ===
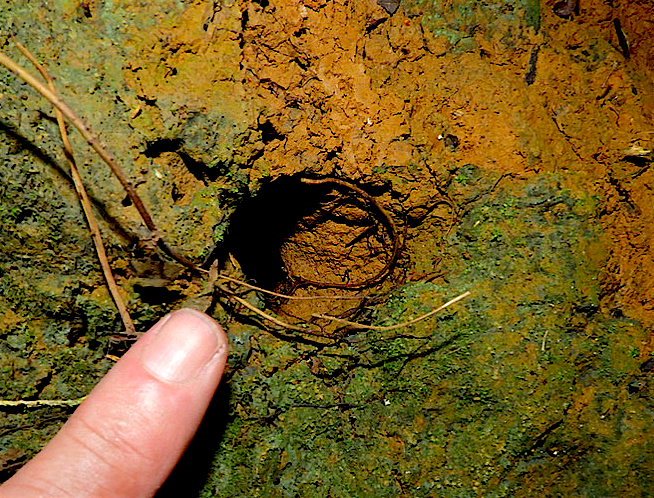
Broad-billed tody nest entrance, Los Limones, Dominican Republic. This nest was a half-meter down in the vertical wall of a 2m x 2m x 1 m-deep sinkhole in the backyard of a residence.

Similar to other Coraciiformes, the broad-billed tody will dig burrows within embankments to house their nests, which are 3.7 centimeters wide and 4.0 centimeters high, while the burrow can be as deep as 60 centimeters. Males and females will both participate in the creation of burrows, with their construction beginning as early as September and continuing until June. The breeding season begins in April and extends to July, which will begin with the male tody attempting to court the female tody using a variety of techniques. The male may chase the female in mid-air and perform a series of flights and tumbles as the female chases the male back, it may also hop around on perches, seemingly agitated, while fluffing its feathers. A very important component of the courtship is the 'flank display'. This is where the male puffs up its pink flank feathers to varying degrees of intensity. At the height of his display, he will completely inflate, appearing as a round green puffball with no wings, and his pink flank feathers will seemingly extend over his back. The most attractive male will be the male with the most flank feathers, as the extension of the pink color over the back is what most impresses the female. Finally, the male will also flick its wings to generate a 'rattling' sound, which is a courtship trait unique to the tody. Broad-billed todies are seasonally monogamous, meaning that once a pair forms, they will usually stay with that mate until the end of the breeding season, though multiple matings and clutches have been observed. The female indicates her desire for copulation by flapping her wings and then spreading them out, while lifting her tail. Tody females will usually lay one clutch of one to four eggs per season, the incubation of which takes about two to three weeks, with both the male and the female participating, though the female does incubate a larger percent of the time. The broad-billed tody is considered an inattentive parent, because it spends less than a quarter of its daylight time incubating the eggs. The parents do not have any ritual greeting when they return to the nest and are primarily silent when encountering their young. In terms of feeding their young, the broad-billed tody is extremely diligent, with one study recording 420 feedings a day for a clutch of three, which is higher than any other insectivorous bird. Once the nestlings are born, they are kept in the nest for another two to three weeks until they leave, upon which the breeding pair separates and the young birds survive on their own.

=== Vocalization ===
The broad-billed tody is a very chatty bird, constantly making noise and bobbing its body among perches. Their main vocalization is a whistle, which a monotonous terp, terp, terp sound, with no change in tempo or pitch. When the broad-billed tody encounters a predator, a competitor or is generally being aggressive, it has a "trilly, chattering vocalization. It also makes unusual guttural sounds, which do not sound like a call and are most likely reserved for the breeding season. Broad-billed todies, like other species of todies, have the simplest range of frequencies of all avian vocalizations. In terms of non-vocal sounds, they can make a rattling sound with their wings by passing air through their feathers rapidly, the sound of which resembles quickly pulling one's finger across a comb. This wing-rattling can be heard most often during the breeding season.

=== Diet ===
Broad-billed todies are insectivorous and require a large amount of prey year-round, having a varied diet consisting of around fifty insect families, with the most foraged invertebrates being grasshoppers, crickets, beetles, moths and butterflies, flies, and cockroaches. The broad-billed tody will also eat specific fruits belonging to the families Brunelliaceae, Chenopodiaceae and Clusiaceae, as well as small vertebrates like small anole lizards. To catch prey, the broad-billed tody uses a technique common to the family Todidae, called the underleaf-sally. The tody will sit on a perch and keep its eyes and bill pointed upward, scanning for prey on the underside of leaves. In a quick, jerking motion, the tody will jump up in a parabolic arc and catch the prey mid-air, landing onto another perch or farther down the same perch, without interruption. Since it lives in a dry habitat, the broad-billed tody also utilizes the "Sally-Pounce", which is where prey is snapped from the upperparts of leaves, as the tody swoops downwards from its perch. Of all the todies, the broad-billed tody forages at the highest height, approximately 3.1 meters off the ground. Since the broad-billed tody and the narrow billed-tody coexist on the same island, some inter-species flocking does occur in pine forests, in which case the broad-billed tody will forage at significantly higher heights, approximately 5.2 meters off the ground. These broad-billed todies will fly into more open canopies, and catch larger prey, also using more broad and horizontal maneuvers to catch prey, rather than short, jerky movements.

== Anatomy and flight ==
The broad-billed tody's wings are short and rounded making them inefficient for long-distance flight. However, due to the nature of the tody's sedentary lifestyle, feeding techniques and small territory size, elaborate wings are not necessary. Their wing chord measures 5.0 centimeters, with their average flight distance being 2.2 meters, giving them the largest wing chord and the longest flight distance of all the todies, owing to the fact they forage higher off the ground, in more open canopies. Despite this advantage, they are the least active of all the todies. The broad-billed tody rarely flies, and instead hops sideways along perches for movement, by flapping its wings one to two times to barely lift its body off the surface. This method is the least expensive in terms of energy expenditure. Furthermore, broad-billed todies rarely visit the ground, preferring to hop along the ground instead of walking if they do. Since the broad-billed tody spends most of its life hopping along perches, it has tiny feet able to grasp the slimmest of branches or twigs, its average perch diameter being 1.1 centimeters. During foraging, the broad-billed tody will fly less than 1.5 meters per maneuver, and then have to sit for several seconds before attempting to fly again.

== Status and conservation ==
According to the IUCN Red List, the broad-billed tody is categorized as a least-concern species. The species occupies a large area on Hispaniola, estimated to be 121,000 square kilometers. Furthermore, the population does seem to be in decline, but not at a fast enough rate to be considered threatened. Human development has partly helped the broad-billed tody in some ways, the building of ditches and trail sides having created the embankments that the todies seem to prefer to dig their burrows, as well as the growth of coffee plantations grown under canopies providing more shelter and food for the broad-billed tody. However, coffee corporations have realized that growing coffee directly under the sun creates a more economical, but lower-quality product, which, coupled with the use of pesticides for local hotel resorts, has accelerated the habitat destruction of broad-billed todies. In regards to the conservation of this species, efforts must be made to protect wooded habitats and prevent further deforestation. Finally, encouraging population growth in wooded areas would be simple, needing only the return to canopy-grown coffee plantations and providing man-made embankments to encourage reproductive success.
