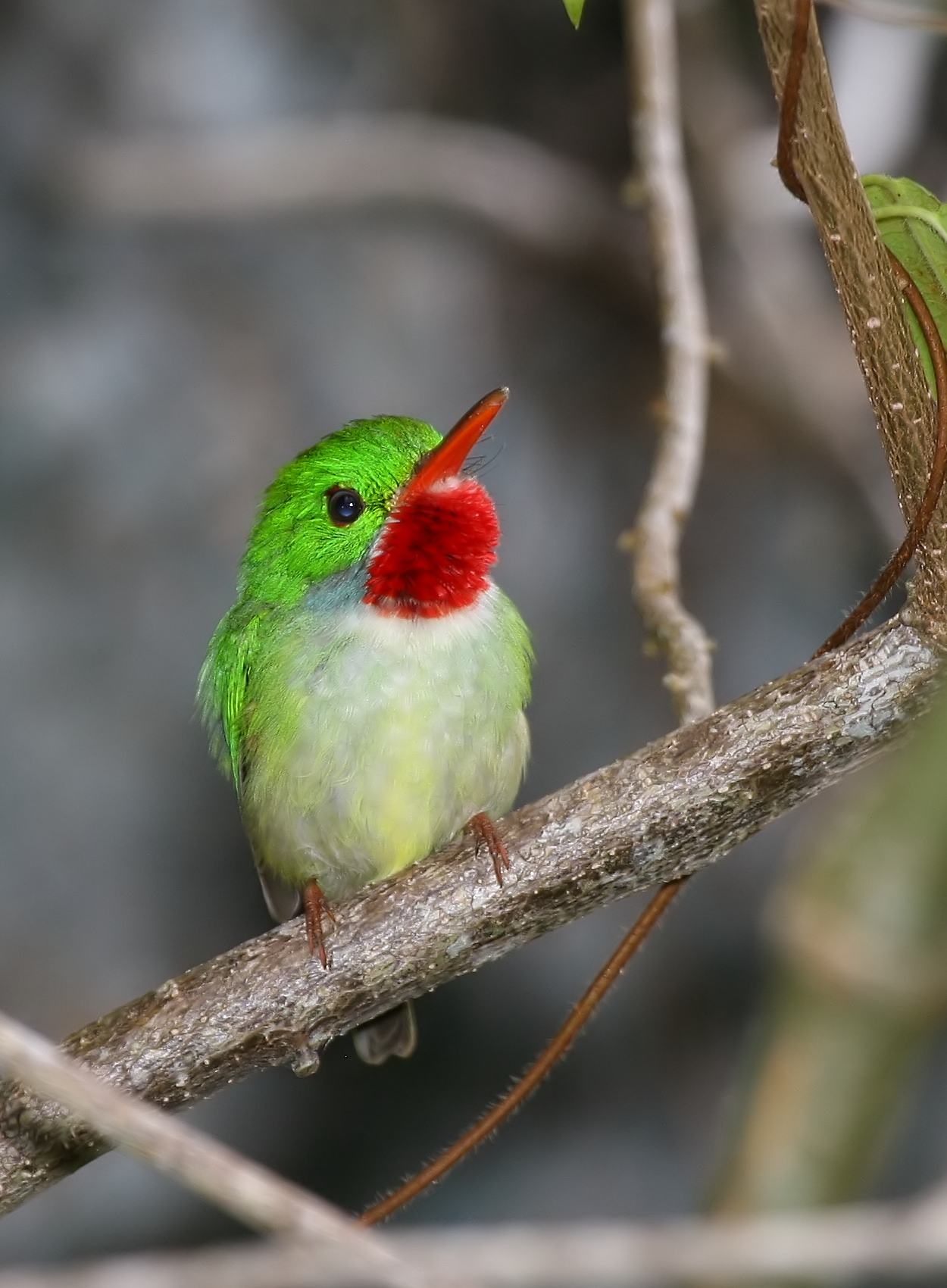
- Photo of Jamaican tody (Todus todus) taken by Dominic Sherony

Conservation status
- Least Concern (IUCN 3.1)

Scientific classification
- Kingdom: Animalia
- Phylum: Chordata
- Class: Aves
- Order: Coraciiformes
- Family: Todidae
- Genus: Todus
- Species: T. todus

Binomial name
- Todus todus (Linnaeus, 1758)
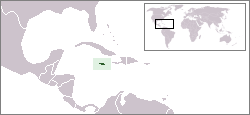
- Green color shows range of species Todus todus - only found in Jamaica

Synonyms
- Alcedo todus Linnaeus, 1758; Todus viridis Linnaeus, 1766

= Jamaican tody =

Species of bird

The Jamaican tody (Todus todus) is a species of bird in the genus Todus endemic to Jamaica. Local names for the Jamaican tody include rasta bird, robin and robin redbreast.

== Taxonomy ==
The Jamaican tody was formally described in 1758 by the Swedish naturalist Carl Linnaeus in the tenth edition of his Systema Naturae. He placed it with the kingfishers in the genus Alcedo and coined the binomial name Alcedo todus. Linnaeus cited earlier works including the 1713 description by the English parson and naturalist John Ray, the 1725 description by the collector Hans Sloane, the 1750 description and hand-colour etching by George Edwards and the 1756 description by Irish physician Patrick Browne. The Jamaican tody is now one of five species placed in the genus Todus that was introduced in 1760 by the French zoologist Mathurin Jacques Brisson.

== Description ==
The Jamaican tody is a small, chunky bird that averages about 9 cm (or 4.25") in size. The wing size for all tody species ranges between 42.8mm and 50.3mm. The Jamaican tody's wing size is intermediate between these sizes (about 46mm) compared to the Cuban and Puerto Rican todies, which tend to have smaller wings, and the broad-billed tody, which has the largest. The wing size of the Jamaican tody correlates with their average flight distance, which is about 1.5m, and their maximum flight distance, which is 26m. The average weight of the Jamaican tody is around 6.4 grams. They have a bright green head, red throat and a long, broad and flat red bill. They look very similar to the Puerto Rican tody (Todus mexicanus) but have a whitish breast that is blended with green, becoming even slightly yellow on the abdomen and under the tail-coverts. The Jamaican tody also has blue-gray subauricular feathers. Their legs and feet are reddish brown. Todies are generally a sexually monomorphic genus. However, some tody species have different eye colors between males and females, but in the Jamaican tody, this iris color is undistinguishable. Jamaican todies are very quiet birds during nonbreeding months but can be heard more frequently during the spring and summer. The vocalizations of the Jamaican tody are predominately a loud beep sound and a throat-rattle. (see external link below) The loud beep is a nasal sounding note that is similar in length to the loud beep of the Puerto Rican tody. The throat-rattling is a rapid, harsh-sounding noise that is produced often in territorial defense.

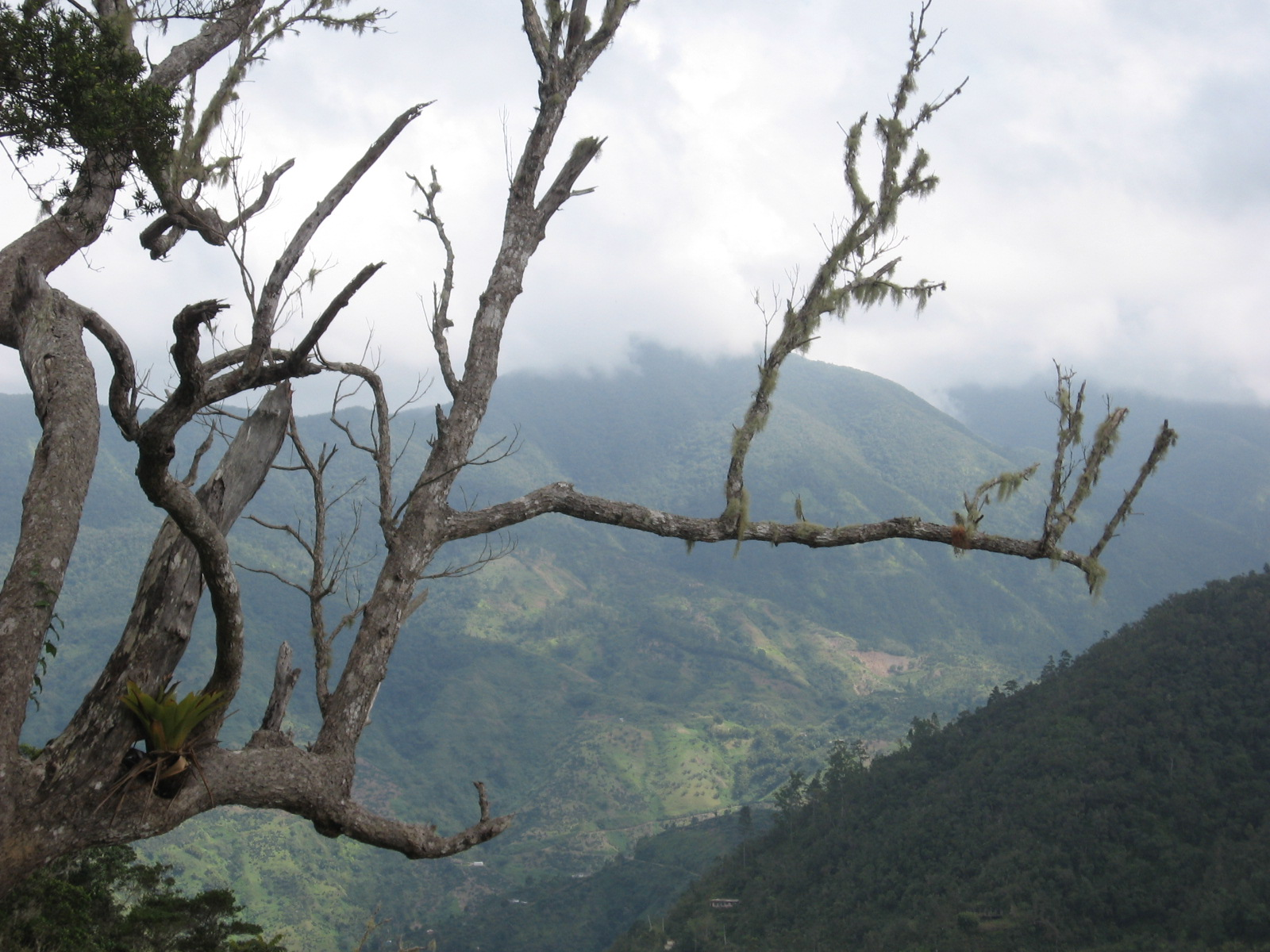
The Blue Mountains in Jamaica are one of the Jamaican tody's most common habitats

== Distribution and habitat ==
The Jamaican tody is endemic to Jamaica. They are found all around the island and can be seen near the semi-arid coast or in the humid mountains. They generally travel in pairs and can be found most commonly in forested areas, occurring in second-growth, untouched habitats, including mesic limestone forests, arid limestone forests, montane forest, shaded coffee plantations and even mangroves. The Jamaican tody is most visible during the spring and summer months, and are much more silent and easy to find during the fall and winter.

== Ecology and behavior ==
=== Maintenance behavior ===
Todies can be found generally performing two bathing techniques, bathing in flight after a dive and bathing in wet plant leaves or in light rain. They also perform bill-wiping, where they will clean both sides of their beak, from base to tip, especially after eating or preening and fluffing their feathers. To fluff their head feathers, they will shake their head back and forth in a fast, jerky movement. Todies also preen their feathers with their flat bills and this mainly occurs in their breast and wing areas on their body.

=== Breeding ===
The Jamaican tody is a relatively quiet bird during the non-breeding season. However during the breeding season, they perform increased wing-rattling for both courtship and to show other todies that this is their territory. Courtship feeding has also been observed in the Jamaican tody where a dead insect is exchanged between two partners. In one observation of Jamaican tody copulation, the male chased the female a short distance and once she landed, he swooped down on her and held her crown while performing 29 cloacal contacts in the span of 35 seconds. Soon after, throat-rattles were heard and the two todies flew away in separate directions.

Jamaican todies can sometimes be found digging, in which they mainly use their rhamphotheca to create a nesting site. Their eggs are laid in unlined chambers near the end of their burrows, which are holes created in the soil on top of the hard, limestone habitats. The eggs are round, shiny and white, except when they are freshly laid and have a pinkish tint to them. They lay between 1 and 4 white eggs during their breeding season which lasts from December to July. The average size of a Jamaican tody egg is about 16.1 mm long and 13.3 mm wide. One egg is laid each night until the clutch is finished, and then eggs are incubated between 21 and 22 days before hatching asynchronously. Once the young emerge from the shell, the eggs are left in the chamber. While the burrows are generally occupied by todies, other species can sometimes be found inhabiting their homes such as spiders, field mice and lizards.

=== Food and feeding ===
The Jamaican tody uses a sit-and-watch foraging strategy to capture its prey, which is similar to other todies in the genus Todus that can be found on nearby islands in the West Indies. They nearly entirely feed on insects and the larvae of insects but will occasionally eat fruit as well. The majority of their foraging is done below nine-tenths of the maximum canopy height of the forest, and is done in both dry and wet forests. From a perch, Jamaican todies scan the undersides and occasionally, uppersides of leaves for insects in which they will swoop down or up, respectively to catch insects. The smaller insects are swallowed in air while the larger ones are smashed against twigs before consuming. This insect consumption occurs almost continuously throughout the day, where they will eat around 1 to 2 insects per minute if available. The method of drinking for the Jamaican tody has not been observed but it is assumed that they get most of their water from leaf droplets and food they consume.

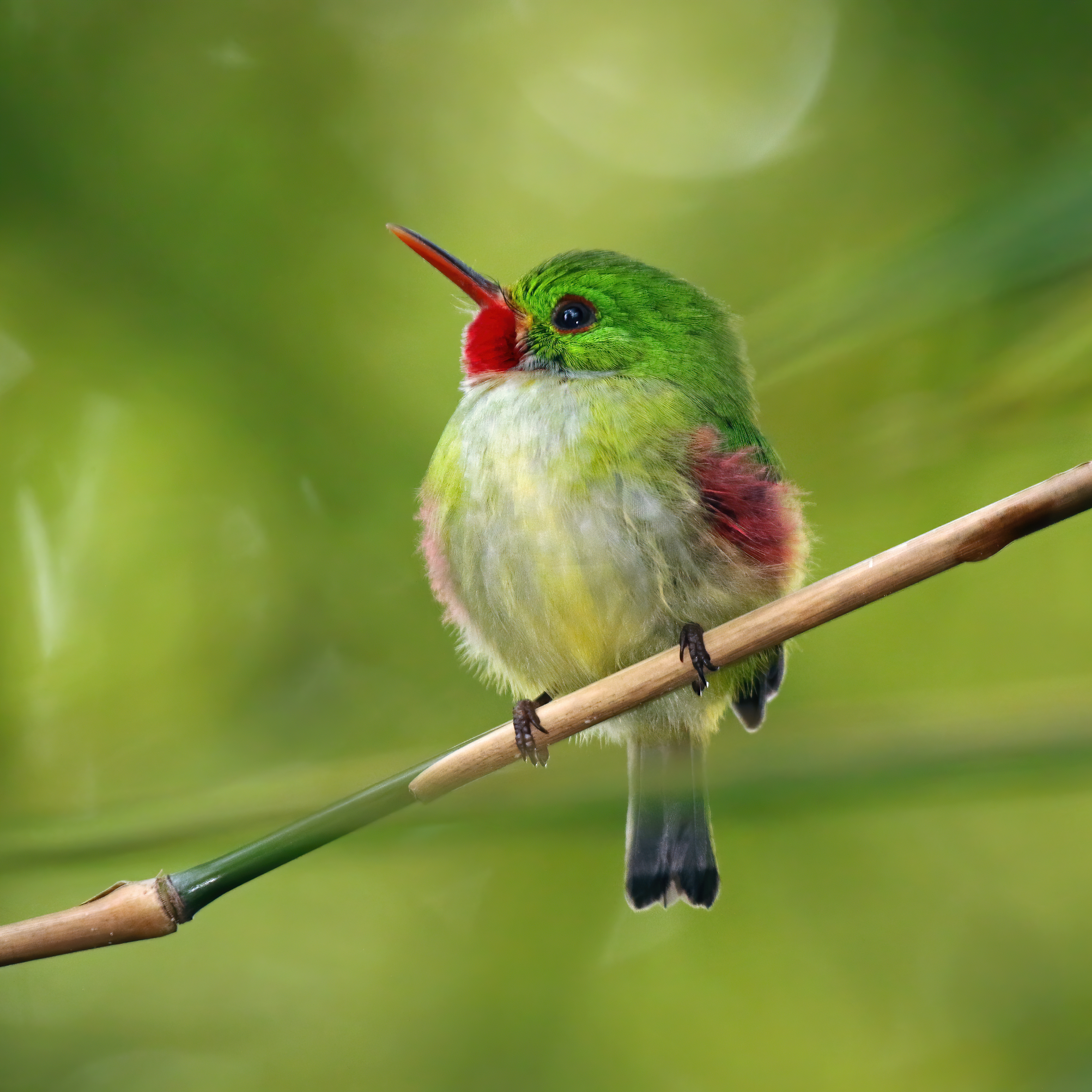
Jamaican tody perched on branch in tree

== Threats to survival ==
Forest fragmentation may have an impact on the Jamaican tody. When the todies were translocated between 0.6km and 4km in a study, only 62% returned to their territories. Increasing the number of tree coverage seemed to increase normal bird movement and therefore supports the need to increase protection of forested areas as well as increase restoration of tree coverage in deforested areas. Aside from humans, loud noises, such as cars, may seem threatening to the Jamaican tody and cause them to display territorial behavior. These displays include wing-flicking, flank displays where the flank feathers expand over the edge of lower wings, and a horizontal glare, where the Jamaican tody will stare down an opponent as a form of intimidation. Territorial vocalizations can also be heard and include throat-rattles and loud beeps. The major predatory threat to the Jamaican tody is the introduced mongoose, which destroy tody burrows that house young that are still in their nestling stage.

== Relationship to humans ==
A large number of avian habitats in Jamaica are being altered by humans for both settlement as well as farming purposes. Coffee production is a large export for Jamaica and with coffee farms comes a great amount of biodiversity, some more welcomed than others. The pest control services provided by birds was examined in Jamaica's Blue Mountains. The most common pest found was the coffee berry borer, since their entire life is spent inside of coffee berries. The Jamaican tody was found to be one of the top five birds on coffee farms in the Blue Mountains that help to keep the number of pests under control, leading to more saleable fruit, increased coffee yields and increased income for farmers.

== Status ==
According to the IUCN Red List of Threatened Species, the Jamaican tody is classified as least concern. The justification for this classification is that although they live in a small range, they still meet the size criterion and do not have greater than 30% decrease in population size over 10 years.
