= Masoni Island =

Island in Indonesia

Native name: Pulau Masoni
- Interactive map of Masoni Island

Geography
- Coordinates: 1°45′S 124°10′E
- Archipelago: Banggai archipelago

Masoni Island (Id:Pulau Masoni), also known as Sonit Island, is an island in Central Sulawesi, Indonesia. The island is low-lying, and is around 12 miles northwest of Timpaus Island. The waters surrounding the island are rich in corals, and the island is considered a regional water conservation area.
