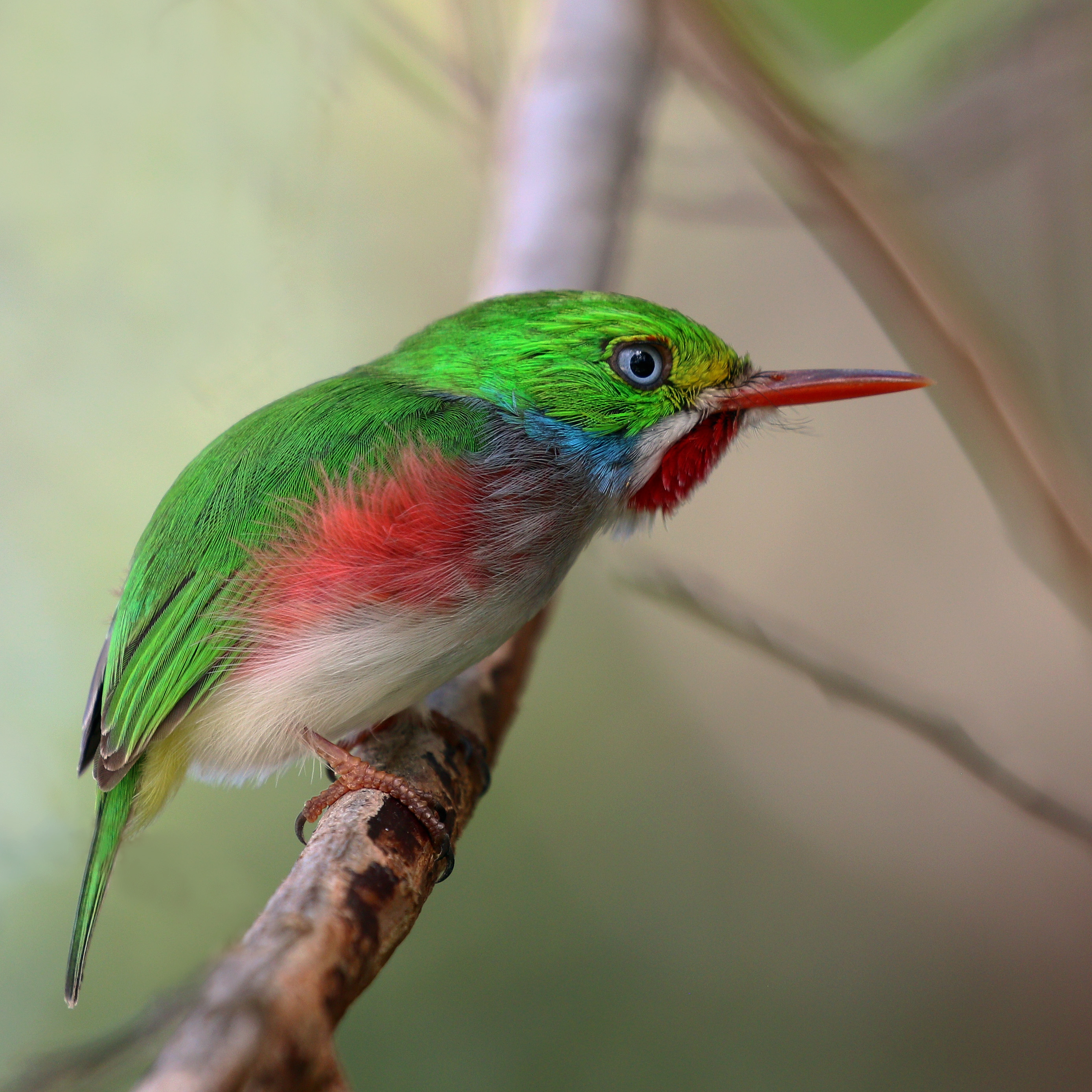
- Cuban tody (Todus multicolor)

Scientific classification
- Kingdom: Animalia
- Phylum: Chordata
- Class: Aves
- Order: Coraciiformes
- Family: Todidae; Vigors, 1825

Genera
- Todus †Palaeotodus
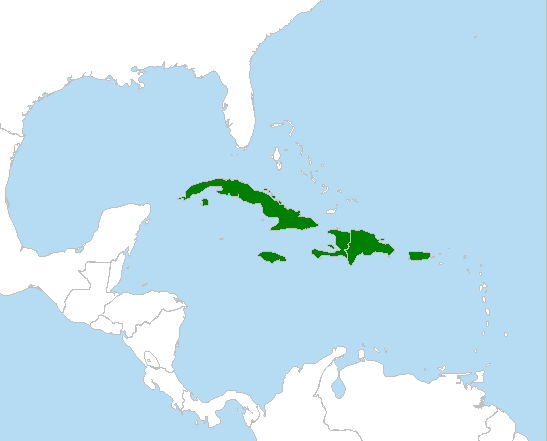
- Global range (in green)

= Tody =

Todies Temporal range: 34–0 Ma Oligocene to present

Family of birds

The todies are a family, Todidae, of tiny Caribbean birds in the order Coraciiformes, which also includes the kingfishers, bee-eaters and rollers. The family has one living genus, Todus, with five extant species, and one extinct genus known from the fossil record, Palaeotodus, with three known species.

== Taxonomy and systematics ==
The todies were originally placed in the kingfisher genus Alcedo before being placed in the genus Todus in 1760 by Mathurin Jacques Brisson. In the past they have been linked to a large number of potential relatives in different orders, including nightjars, trogons, barbets, jacamars, puffbirds, kingfishers, motmots, and even some passerine species such as broadbills, cotingas, and flowerpeckers. The todies were then previously placed in their own order, Todiformes, before being placed in the Coraciiformes under the family Todidae.

Genetic analysis of the extant species suggests that they diversified between 6–7 million years ago. The fossil record of the family is sparse, although three species of tody have been described from fossils found in North America, Germany, and France, showing that the family was once more widespread than it is today, with the tody's present-day range restricted entirely to the Greater Antilles islands in the Caribbean Sea. Species from the fossil genus Palaeotodus are larger than living species and may have been closer in size to the modern tody motmot.

The phylogenetic relationship between the six families that make up the order Coraciiformes is shown in the cladogram below. The number of species in each family is taken from the list maintained by Frank Gill, Pamela C. Rasmussen and David Donsker on behalf of the International Ornithological Committee (IOC).

- Coraciiformes
  - - Meropidae – bee-eaters (31 species)
    - - Brachypteraciidae – ground rollers (5 species)
      - Coraciidae – rollers (13 species)
  - - Todidae – todies (5 species)
    - - Momotidae – motmots (14 species)
      - Alcedinidae – kingfishers (118 species)

== Distribution and habitat ==
The todies are endemic to the islands of the Caribbean. These are small birds that live in the forests of the Greater Antilles. Each main island of the four islands (and their respective adjacent islands) that make up the Greater Antilles has one species of tody, with the exception of the island of Hispaniola (and its adjacent islands) which has two species of tody: the Puerto Rican tody (Todus mexicanus) is found in Puerto Rico; the type species, the Jamaican tody (Todus todus), is found in Jamaica; and the Cuban tody (Todus multicolor) is found in Cuba. In Hispaniola, the broad-billed tody (Todus subulatus) is found in the lowlands (including Gonâve Island of Haiti), and the narrow-billed tody (Todus angustirostris) is found in the highlands.

== Description ==
Todies range in weight from 5 to 7 g and in length from 10 to 11.5 cm. They have colourful plumage and resemble kingfishers in their general shape. They have green heads, backs and wings, red throats (absent in immature Puerto Rican, broad-billed, and narrow-billed todies) with a white and blue-grey stripe on each side, and yellow undertail coverts; the colour of the rest of the undersides is pale and varies according to species. The irises are pale grey. They have long, flattened bills (as do many flycatching birds) with serrated edges; the upper mandible is black and the lower is red with a little black. The legs, and especially the feet, are small. Todies are highly vocal, except that the Jamaican tody seldom calls in the non-breeding season (August to November); they give simple, unmusical buzzing notes, beeps, and guttural rattles, puffing their throats out with every call. Their wings produce a "strange, whirring rattle", though mostly when courting or defending territory in the Puerto Rican tody.

== Behaviour and ecology ==
=== Diet ===
Todies eat small prey such as insects and lizards. Insects from 50 families have been identified in their diet, particularly grasshoppers, crickets, beetles, bugs, butterflies, bees, wasps, and ants, form the greater part of the diet. Spiders and millipedes may also be taken, as is a small amount of fruit (2% of the diet).

Their preferred habitat for foraging is in the forest understory. Todies typically sit on a low, small branch, singly or in pairs, keeping still or stepping or hopping sideways. When they see prey moving on the lower surface of a leaf, they fly a short distance (averaging 2.2 m in the broad-billed tody and 1.0 m in the Puerto Rican tody), diagonally upward to glean it. They may also take prey from the ground, occasionally chasing it with a few hops. Todies are generally sedentary; the longest single flight known for the broad-billed tody is 40 m. Their activity is greatest in the morning when sunny weather follows rain, and in March and September.

Todies are highly territorial but will join mixed-species foraging flocks composed of resident species and migrants from North America, when they pass through their territories.

=== Breeding ===
Like most of the Coraciiformes, todies nest in tunnels, which they dig with their beaks and feet in steep banks or rotten tree trunks. The tunnel is 30 cm long in the Cuban and narrow-billed todies, 30 to 60 cm in the broad-billed tody, and ends in a nest chamber, generally not reused. They lay about four round white eggs in the chamber. Both parents incubate but are surprisingly inattentive to the eggs. The young are altricial and stay in the nest until they can fly. Both parents also care for the nestlings, much more attentively; they may feed each chick up to 140 times per day, the highest rate known among birds.

== Species list ==
- Todus

- Broad-billed tody, Todus subulatus
- Cuban tody, Todus multicolor
- Jamaican tody, Todus todus
- Narrow-billed tody, Todus angustirostris
- Puerto Rican tody, Todus mexicanus

- †Palaeotodus

- †Palaeotodus emryi
- †Palaeotodus escampsiensis
- †Palaeotodus itardiensis
