= Pulau Ayu =

Pulau Ayau
- Location within Western New Guinea
- Coordinates: 0°22′29″N 131°2′45″E
- Country: Indonesia
- Province: Southwest Papua

Area
  - Land: 5.06 km^{2} (1.95 sq mi)
- Time zone: UTC+09:00 (Eastern Indonesian Time)

Pulau Ayu
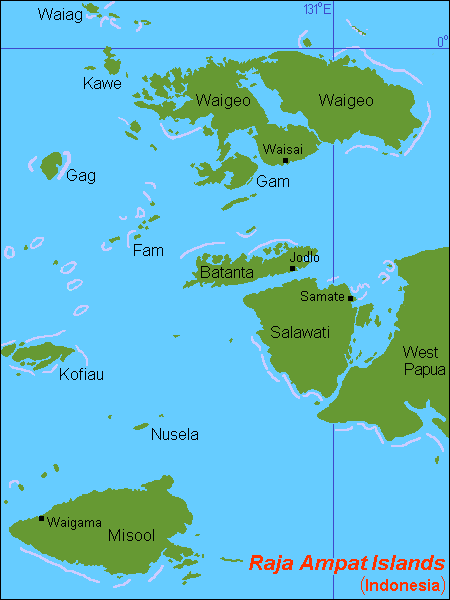
- Location of Pulau Ayu listed as Ayau (Ayu Islands) in the Raja Ampat Islands located in the top right corner of the map.
- Interactive map of Pulau Ayu

Geography
- Location: South East Asia
- Coordinates: 0°22′N 131°02′E
- Archipelago: Ayu Islands
- Total islands: 5 (2 uninhabited)
- Major islands: Pulau Ayau, Pulau Reni, Pulau Kanobe
- Province: Southwest Papua

Demographics
- Ethnic groups: Melanesians, Papuans, Austronesians

Pulau Ayau, often called Pulau Aju or simply Ajoe, is a small Indonesian island located in the Ayau Islands above the northern tip of the Waigeo Islands.

Pulau Ayau is administratively part of the Raja Ampat Regency in the Southwest Papua Province of Indonesia.

The two major settlements on the island include Imbik Kuan and Ayu.

The island is surrounded by two large reefs.

Pulau Reni and Pulau Kanobe are two other small inhabited islands north of Pulau Ayau.

Access to the island is limited to small boats due to the reefs and the small size of the island.

== World War II ==
Pulau Ayau and all the islands in the Ayau Archipelago were occupied by the Empire of Japan during World War II from 1942 until the end of the war in 1945.
