= Mules Island =

Island in Indonesia

Native name: Pulau Mules
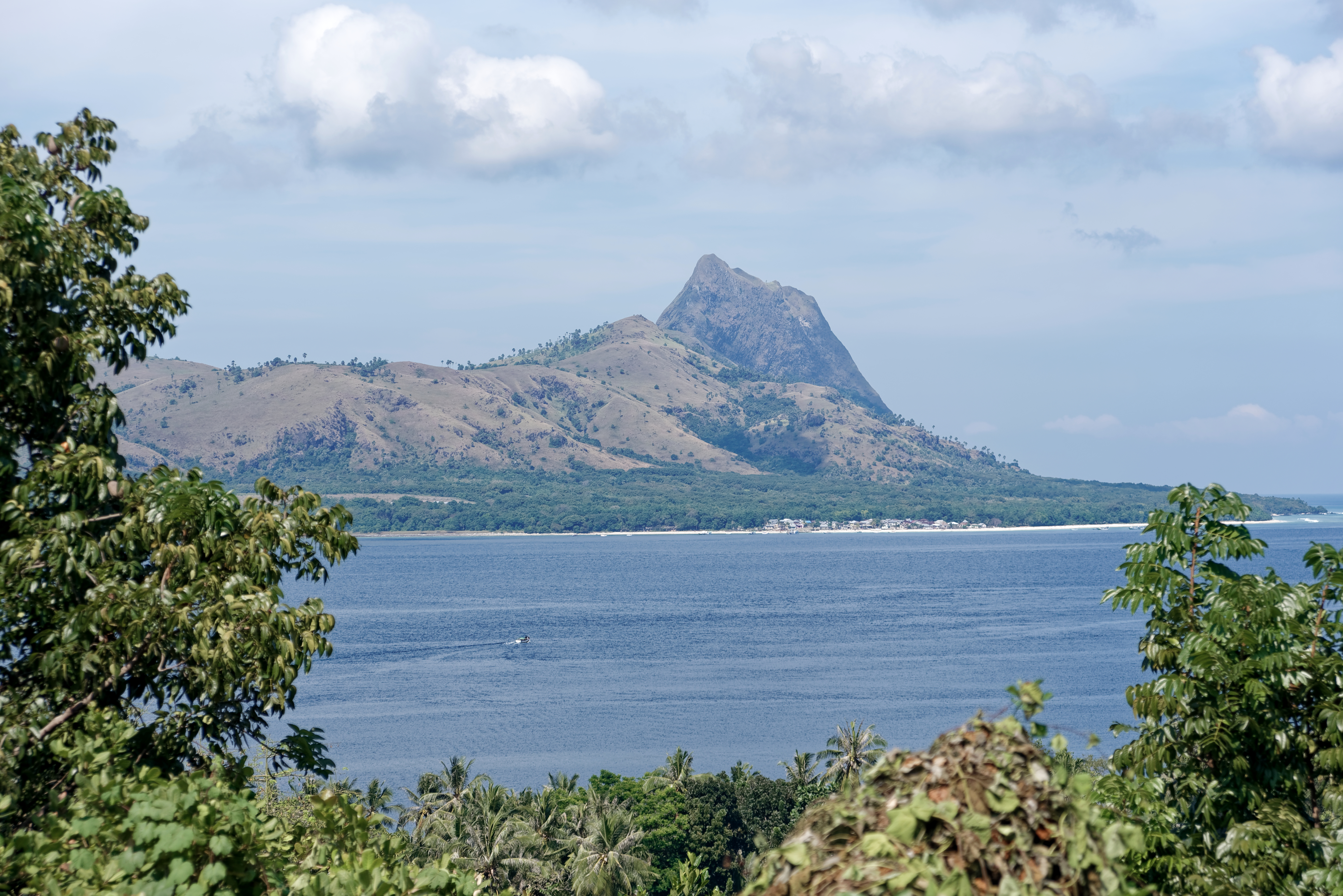
- A view of muses island's mountain
- Interactive map of Mules Island

Geography
- Coordinates: 8°54′S 120°17′E
- Adjacent to: Savu Sea

Mules Island (Indonesian: Pulau Mules), also known as Nuca Molas, is an island in the Savu Sea. The island is administered as part of Manggarai Regency in the province of East Nusa Tenggara, Indonesia.

== Description ==
Myles Island is located in the Savu Sea and is located just south of the island of Flores. The economy of the island is dominated by farming and fishing, though in 2018 the government of Indonesia began to invest on the island as a tourist destination.

The island is intermittently affected by water shortages. The island is a nesting ground for both endemic and migratory birds.

== Demographics ==
Unlike the island of Flores, where the majority adhere to Catholicism, the population here is adhere to Islam. Islam is said to have been brought to the island's early inhabitants by the Bimanese, Ende, and Bugis. They finally lived together on this island, with ethnic diversity, including the Manggarai, Ende, Bugis, Bimanese, and a small part of the Ngada.
