= Simatang Island =

Island in Indonesia

Coordinates: 01°02′35.16″N 120°23′01″E

Native name: Pulau Simatang
- Interactive map of Simatang Island

Geography
- Location: Central Sulawesi, Indonesia
- Adjacent to: Celebes Sea

Simatang Island (Indonesian: Pulau Simatang) is an island in the Celebes Sea off the north-central coast of Sulawesi. The island is administered as part of the Indonesian province of Central Sulawesi.

== Description ==
The island is covered in greenery and is famous for its level of marine diversity. In the 1960s, the island was described as being heavily wooded with extensive reefs surrounding it.

Simatang was used as a reference point during World War II. In one notable instance, American president Franklin Delano Roosevelt requested to see Simatang island on a map. When the White House staff and the United States navy were unable to find an accurate map showing Simatang, the National Geographic Society was contacted to provide a map. This incident spurred the society to create a special map cabinet for President Roosevelt, starting a tradition of the society gifting maps to US presidents.
