= Bawal Island =

Island in Indonesia

Native name: Pulau Bawal
- Interactive map of Bawal Island

Geography
- Location: West Kalimantan, Borneo, Indonesia
- Coordinates: 2.721°S 110.096°E
- Adjacent to: Java Sea

Administration
- Indonesia
- Province: West Kalimantan

Bawal Island, also known as Pulau Bawal, is an island in West Kalimantan, Indonesia. Located off the southern coast of Borneo, the island was heavily wooded as of 2005.
