= Sabalana Islands =

Indonesian atoll

Coordinates: 6°45′S 118°50′E

The Sabalana Islands (Kepulauan Sabalana) are an atoll in the Flores Sea in Indonesia, lying just north of the Lesser Sunda Islands, closer to Sumbawa than Sulawesi. They are west of Tanahjampea Island and north-east of the Tengah Islands (Central Islands). Administratively, the atoll belongs to the province of South Sulawesi. The total area, including the large lagoon, is 2694 km^{2}, making Sabalana one of the largest atolls by total area. The land area of the largest individual island, Pulau Sabalana, measures about 7 km^{2}, followed by Pulau Banawaja with 3 km^{2} and Pulau Sabaru with 1.4 km^{2}.

The Sabalana Islands were formerly known as the Postillon Islands.

The individual islets are listed, clockwise from the northernmost to the southernmost (the western rim of the atoll is free of islets):

1. Pulau Djailamu
2. Pulau Sabaru
3. Pulau Balobaloang-besar
4. Pulau Balobaloang-ketjil
5. Pulau Sumanga
6. Pulau Makaranangang
7. Pulau Laija
8. Pulau Sanane-ketjil
9. Pulau Sanane-besar
10. Pulau Sabalana
11. Pulau Banawaja (easternmost)
12. Pulau Pamolikang
13. Pulau Santigiang
14. Pulau Soroabu
15. Pulau Meong
16. Pulau Matalang
17. Pulau Balalohong
18. Pulau Manukang
19. Pulau Sadulangang
20. Pulau Sarege
