= Pabbiring Islands =

Coordinates: 4.8218099°S 119.355451°E

The Pabbiring Islands are an archipelago off the west coast of South Sulawesi, Indonesia, scattered north-west of the city of Makassar.
