= Ayu Islands =

Archipelago in Southwest Papua, Indonesia

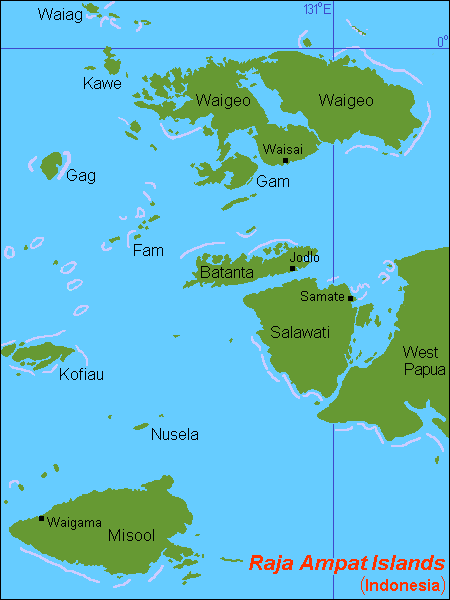
- The Ayau Islands are situated to the north of Waigeo in the Raja Ampat Islands, Southwest Papua, Indonesia
- Interactive map of Ayu Islands

Geography
- Location: South East Asia
- Coordinates: 0°22′N 131°02′E
- Archipelago: Raja Ampat Islands
- Total islands: 5 (2 uninhabited)
- Major islands: Pulau Ayu, Pulau Reni, Pulau Kanobe
- Highest elevation: 106 m (348 ft)

Administration
- Indonesia
- Province: Southwest Papua

Demographics
- Ethnic groups: Melanesians, Papuans, Austronesians

The Ayau Islands (Kepulauan Ayau) are a small archipelago located south of the Asia Islands and north of Waigeo Island within the Raja Ampat Islands of Indonesia. They are separated from Waigeo Island by the Bougainville Strait. The archipelago consists of two coral atolls. The highest elevation reaches 106 m.

On older maps, the islands are labeled as the Ajoe Islands, reflecting the Dutch spelling "Ajoe-eilanden".

The beaches of these islands are a breeding ground for the leatherback turtle (Dermochelys coriacea), while the surrounding waters are popular for snorkeling and scuba diving.

Administratively, the Ayau Islands belong to the Indonesian province of Southwest Papua, and form part of the Raja Ampat Regency.
