= Pulau Reni =

- Location within Western New Guinea
- Coordinates: 0°35′0″N 131°11′33″E
- Country: Indonesia
- Province: Southwest Papua

Area
  - Land: 0.92 km^{2} (0.36 sq mi)
- Time zone: UTC+09:00 (Eastern Indonesian Time)

Pulau Reni
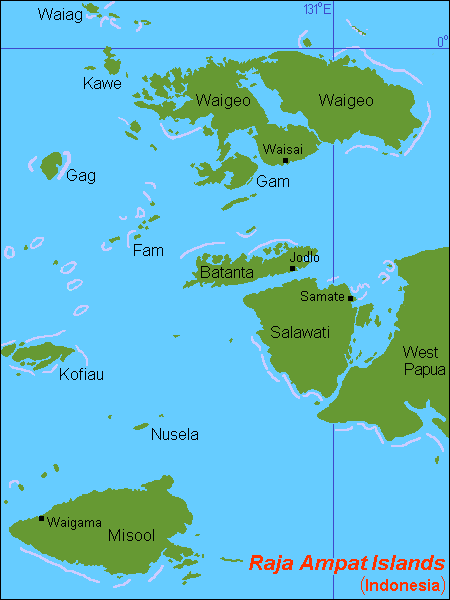
- Location of Pulau Reni listed as Ayau (Ayu Islands) in the Raja Ampat Islands located in the top right corner of the map
- Interactive map of Pulau Reni

Geography
- Location: South East Asia
- Coordinates: 0°22′N 131°02′E
- Archipelago: Ayu Islands
- Total islands: 5 (2 uninhabited)
- Major islands: Pulau Ayu, Pulau Reni, Pulau Kanobe
- Province: Southwest Papua

Demographics
- Ethnic groups: Melanesians, Papuans, Austronesians

Pulau Reni is a small Indonesian island located in the Ayu Archipelago above the northern tip of the Waigeo Islands.

Pulau Reni is part of the Raja Ampat regency of the Southwest Papua geographical and administrative region of Indonesia.

The island is surrounded by two large reefs.

Pulau Ayu and Pulau Kanobe are two other small inhabited islands south-west and south of Pulau Reni.

Pulau Reni lies 27 km (17 mi) north-east of Pulau Ayu and 11 km (6.8 mi) north of Pulau Kanobe.

Access to the island is limited to small boats due to the reefs and the small size of the island.

== World War II ==
Pulau Reni and all the islands in the Ayu Archipelago were occupied by the Empire of Japan during World War II from 1942 until the end of the war in 1945.
