= Tengah Islands =

Islands in the Flores Sea in Indonesia

The Tengah Islands are a group of islands in the Flores Sea in Indonesia, lying just north of the Lesser Sunda Islands, scattered off the north coast of Mount Tambora in Sumbawa. They are south-west of the Sabalana Islands.
