= Sempu (island) =

Island in East Java, Indonesia

Sempu Island
Native name: Pulau Sempu
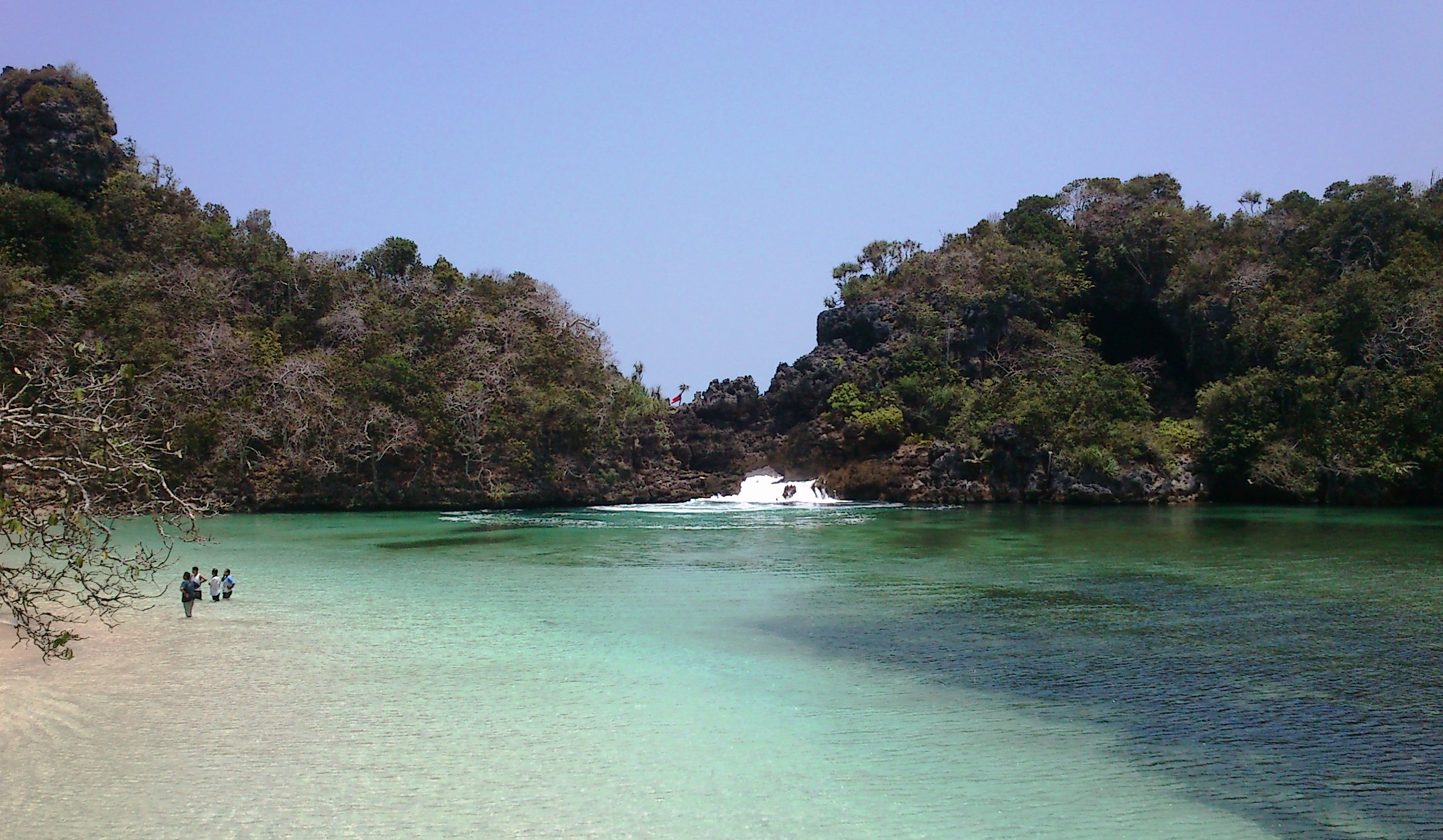

- Location within Indonesia

Geography
- Location: South East Asia
- Coordinates: 8°26′48″S 112°41′43″E
- Archipelago: Greater Sunda Islands
- Area: 8.77 km^{2} (3.39 sq mi)
- Highest elevation: 100 m (300 ft)

Administration
- Indonesia
- Province: East Java

Sempu is an island located 800 meters from the southern coast of the province of East Java in Indonesia, about 70 km south of the city of Malang. The island comprises the administrative village of Tambakrejo within the Sumbermanjing District of Malang Regency, with a population at the 2020 Census of 7,193. It is 3.9 km long and 3.6 km wide and covers a land area of 8.77 km^{2}. Its topography is largely rolling hills whose altitude ranges from 50 to 100 meters above sea level. The coastline consists mainly of limestone cliffs characteristics of the façade of the island of Java in the Indian Ocean.

Sempu is accessed from the village of Sendang Biru, the most important fishing port on the south coast of Java.
