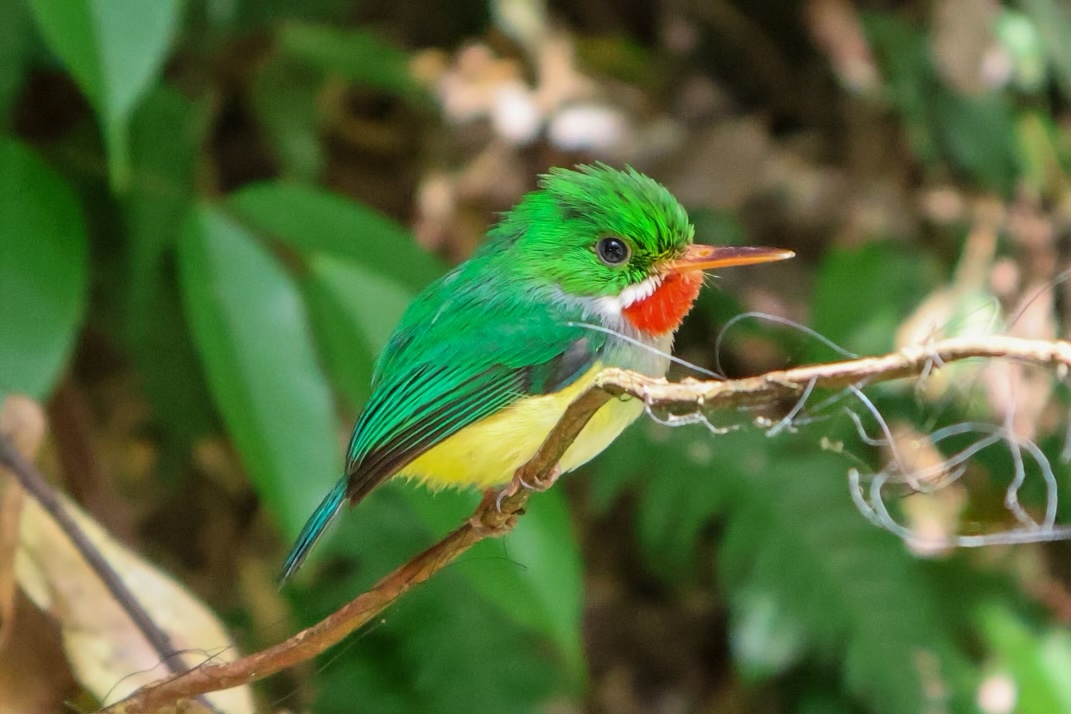

Conservation status
- Least Concern (IUCN 3.1)

Scientific classification
- Kingdom: Animalia
- Phylum: Chordata
- Class: Aves
- Order: Coraciiformes
- Family: Todidae
- Genus: Todus
- Species: T. mexicanus

Binomial name
- Todus mexicanus Lesson, 1838

= Puerto Rican tody =

Species of bird

The Puerto Rican tody (Todus mexicanus), locally known in Spanish as San Pedrito ("little Saint Peter"), is a bird endemic to the main island of Puerto Rico. In 2022, the tody was approved as the official national bird of Puerto Rico by the legislative assembly. However, the proposal did not advance, largely due to the scientific name of the bird which erroneously identifies it as a native of Mexico. In 2023, the assembly approved a petition to the International Commission on Zoological Nomenclature (ICZN) seeking the renaming of the tody as Todus borinquensis.

== Taxonomy ==
Todies are the closest relative to the motmots of Central America. It is thought that the Jamaican tody (Todus todus) gave rise to the Puerto Rican tody after hurricane dispersals, but the relationship between both species has not yet been confirmed. Studies show the Todus genus probably developed before the Pleistocene. Mitochondrial gene studies point to the motmots as their closest relative, although egg white protein electrophoresis studies suggest a relationship to kingfishers.

The Puerto Rican tody's specific epithet, mexicanus (Latin for "from Mexico"), is a misnomer; it is thought that the ornithologist who first described it, René Lesson, erroneously wrote the type specimen's retrieval location as Mexico.

The Puerto Rican tody makes up one of the five endemic Todus species of the Greater Antilles. Hispaniola has two endemic species, while Cuba, Jamaica, and Puerto Rico each have one.

== Description ==
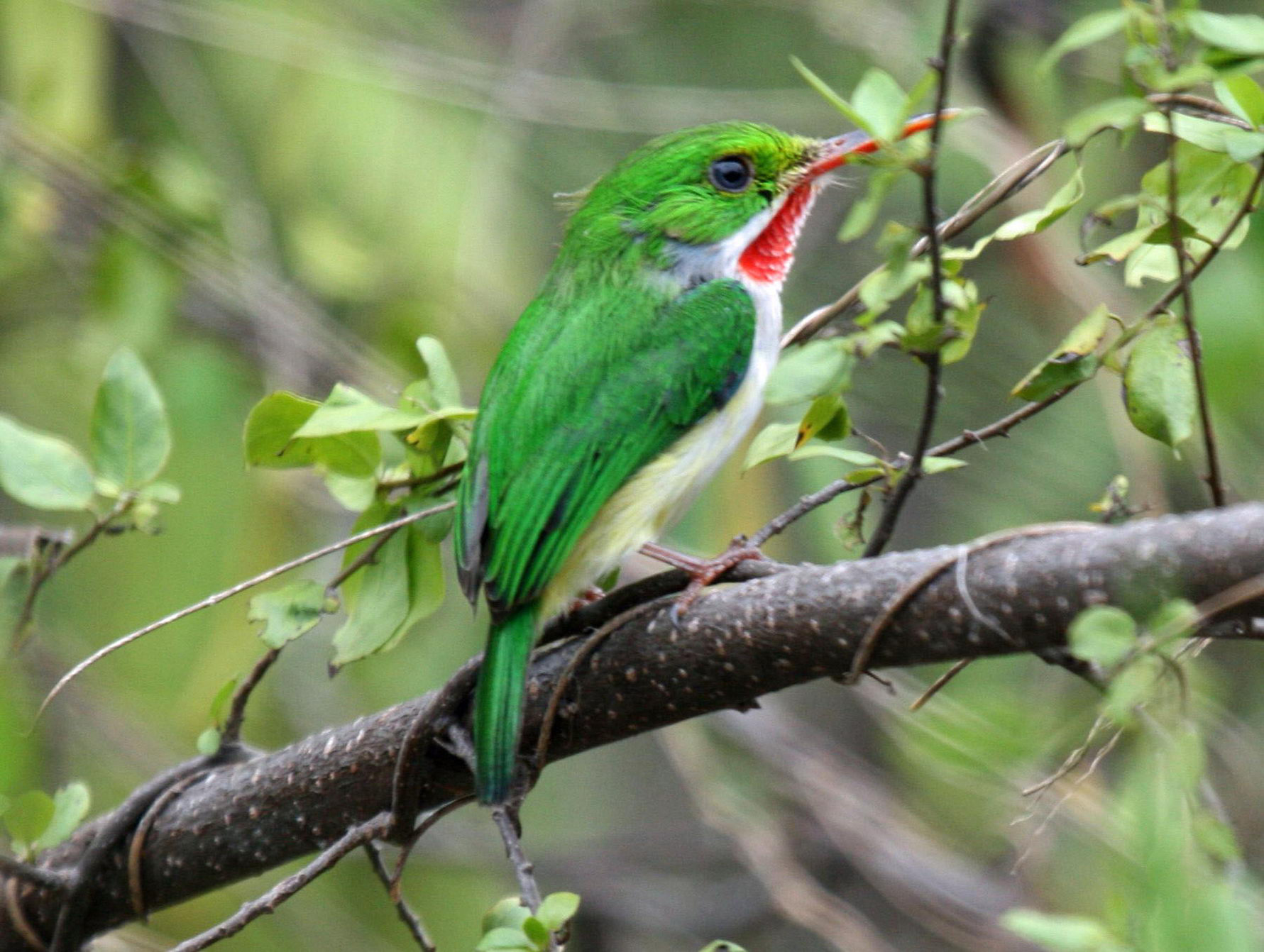

The Puerto Rican tody is a small, brightly colored, non-passerine forest bird. It is one of the smallest representatives of the order Coraciiformes, with an average body length of 11 cm and weight of 5 to 6 g. The upperparts of the Puerto Rican tody are an emerald green color, and it has light-yellow flanks and underside tail coverts, and a white belly and chest. The "San Pedrito", also known as "Medio Peso" by the local people, has a red throat and lower bill, which in itself is long and broad. It can be as long or longer than the head, and as half as long as the wing. Their legs and feet are a brownish color and the tarsus is similar in length to the bill. Both males and females have a short tail, ranging from two-thirds to three-fourths as long as the wings. Males and females are not sexually dichromatic, and their only difference is their eye color; males have gray eyes whereas females' eyes are white. The young have similar colored feathers as the adults, but lack the red markings, have a grayish colored belly and have shorter bills. The Puerto Rican tody differs from the other todies in that it is the only species without pink or yellow-green colored feathers on its flanks.

== Habitat ==
The Puerto Rican tody can be found throughout the main island of Puerto Rico. It is found predominantly in forested areas, especially in high-altitude damp forests where insect concentrations are higher, as well as in dense thickets, such as the Guánica Forest located in the southern region of the island.

=== Territory ===
Todies have small territories. In lowland forests a tody's territory size is approximately 0.7 hectares (1.8 acres), but in higher elevations, where insect prey is less abundant, the territory size can increase up to two hectares per pair. Breeding territories are centered around the nest burrow and are smaller than their home ranges which are defended by the pair year-round.

==== Agonistic displays ====
When the Puerto Rican tody encounters an intruder it fluffs up and raises its crest. If disturbed, a bobbing up and down motion accompanied by vocalizations is portrayed; though both males and females are capable of this display, males tend to bob more. This bobbing display has also been seen after feeding and during nest building. Chasing intruders, wing flicking and wing rattles are also some of the other exhibited displays. The majority of these territorial defense displays is reserved for other todies, as they tend to be very tolerant of other species.

== Diet ==
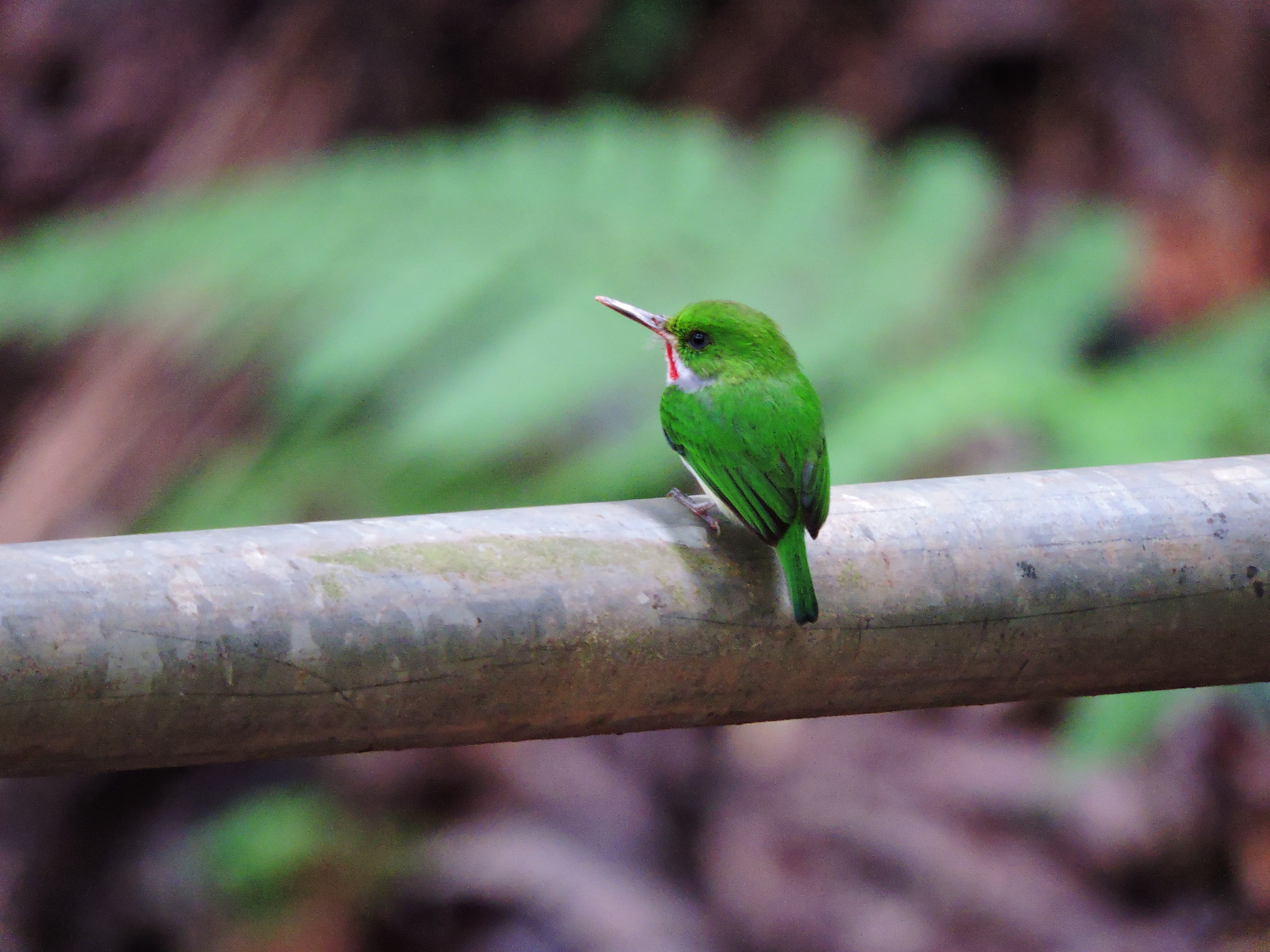

The Puerto Rican tody is primarily insectivorous (85.9% of its diet). Todies eats katydids, grasshoppers, crickets, earwigs, dragonflies, flies, beetles, spiders (8.2%), and occasionally small lizards (3.5%) and frogs. Todies are considered voracious eaters.

Todies forage and feed using different methods, including air-feeding and leaf feeding, the latter being the most common method of foraging. When they leaf feed they sit quietly in high perches and scan the surface below with fast, jerky head motions, often tilting their bills upwards. When the tody sees an insect on a leaf, it will capture it while in a short-curved flight.

When todies air-feed, they have their bills pointed upward, and they fly from the perch snatching the insect and return to a different perch. Todies feed from different surfaces; the most common is leaves and the least common is the ground. The act of perching between foraging flights lasts for an average of 9.0 seconds and reach an average of 1.0 captures per minute in rain forests and 1.7 captures per minute in dense thicket habitats.

The nestling's diet is different. Adults primarily feed their nestlings with the insect families Homoptera (30%), Coleoptera (25%) and Lepidoptera (16%), but they have been found to supplement the hatchling's diet with Clusia krugiana fruit (18.4%). Apart from insects and seeds, the adults also feed their nestlings frogs and lizards, although between those two, frogs are more common.

== Reproduction ==
The species has single broods and is monogamous. Its courtship reaches its peak between February and May and occurs in the breeding area, not far from the nesting site. The ritual consists of chasing each other while rattling the wings. Both male and females achieve a "flank" display before copulating, where they fluff out their flanks causing a spherical ball appearance. The female lifts her tail and enters into a submissive posture to facilitate copulation. During courtship their vocalization becomes agitated and accelerated.

=== Nesting and incubation ===
The Puerto Rican tody has an unusual nesting technique. During an eight-week period, the male and female todies excavate a 25 to 35 cm long, narrow burrow with a right angle in an earth bank. They create their nest at the end of this burrow. This process usually occurs between the months of February and June, before the start of the wet season. Females start laying their eggs 3 to 4 weeks after the nest has been completed. The female lays 1 to 4 bright white eggs, with an average of 2.3 eggs, on consecutive nights. The weight of each egg is equivalent to about one quarter of the females body weight. The responsibility of incubating the eggs is shared by both the male and the female for an average of 21 days, and later on other adult todies (usually previous offsprings) may assist in the development process of the chicks after the chicks have fledged. If nestlings are killed, as well as during incubation and brooding, the mate will bring prey items to the nest.

The clutch size and breeding productivity of this species seems to be greater in shaded coffee plantations compared to species in secondary forests in the north-central area of the island. Todies use half the burrows they excavate. Of all the burrows excavated in their territory, 62.5% and 33% of the nests in dense thickets and rainforest habitats are used respectively. Even though every year new burrows are excavated, 89% of them are 10 meters away from the old ones. Abandoned nests are often used by frog species like the common coqui.

== Behavior ==
Puerto Rican todies are rarely seen on the ground; they usually prefer perching, unless when nesting. When todies are on the ground they hop. An unusual fact is that to enter their burrow they have a favorite perching spot on which they land before heading to their nest. The Puerto Rican tody, unlike other Coraciiformes, roosts alone in trees both during the day and at nighttime.

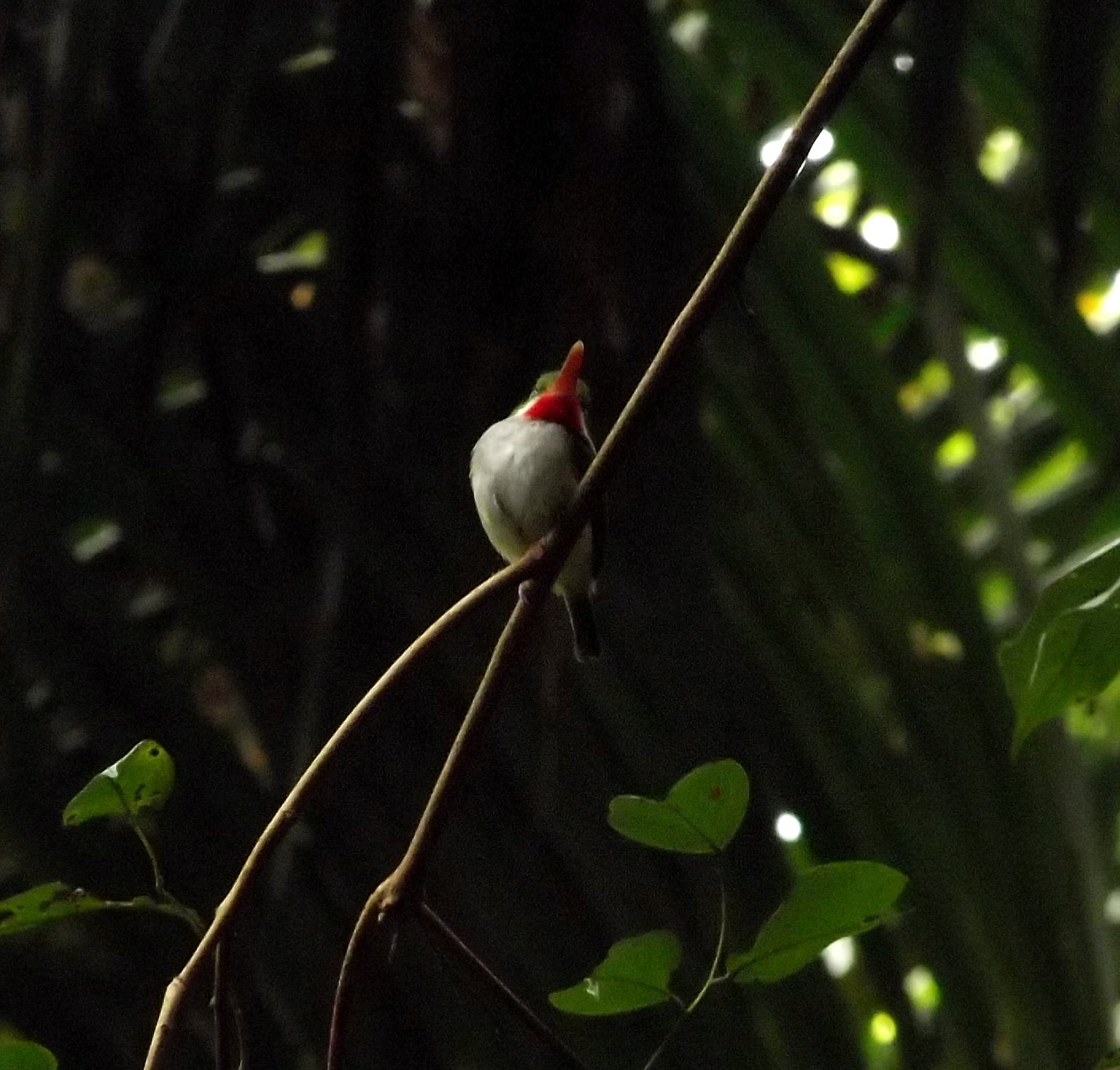

== Physiology ==
The Puerto Rican tody has been researched extensively because of its unusual body temperature, body temperature control and temperature control abilities. Puerto Rican todies exhibit lower body temperatures than other todies, and have also exhibited heterothermy over a range of temperatures. Most coraciiformes have a body temperature of 40 °C, but Puerto Rican todies can maintain a body temperature of 36.7 °C. This allows them to spend 33% less energy than other Coraciiformes. Puerto Rican Todies can lower their body temperatures by 14 °C.

This physiological response varies by both season and sex; only females in breeding season are capable of becoming torpid, although not all individuals become torpid at the same body temperature. During this torpid stage, they are unresponsive, have their eyes closed and erected plumage, but are capable of taking flight soon after an increase in temperature.

== Status and conservation ==
This tody is a common endemic species to the island of Puerto Rico. It is currently classified as Least Concern by the IUCN. During the past, the Puerto Rican tody suffered from human predation as it was captured as food. Currently it suffers from nest predation by introduced Indian mongooses. Other threats include habitat destruction and the transition of shaded coffee plantations into sun coffee plantations.

== See also ==
- Fauna of Puerto Rico
- List of birds of Puerto Rico
- List of endemic fauna of Puerto Rico
- List of Puerto Rican birds
- List of Vieques birds
- El Toro Wilderness
