= Birds of Australia =

Birds native or endemic to Australia

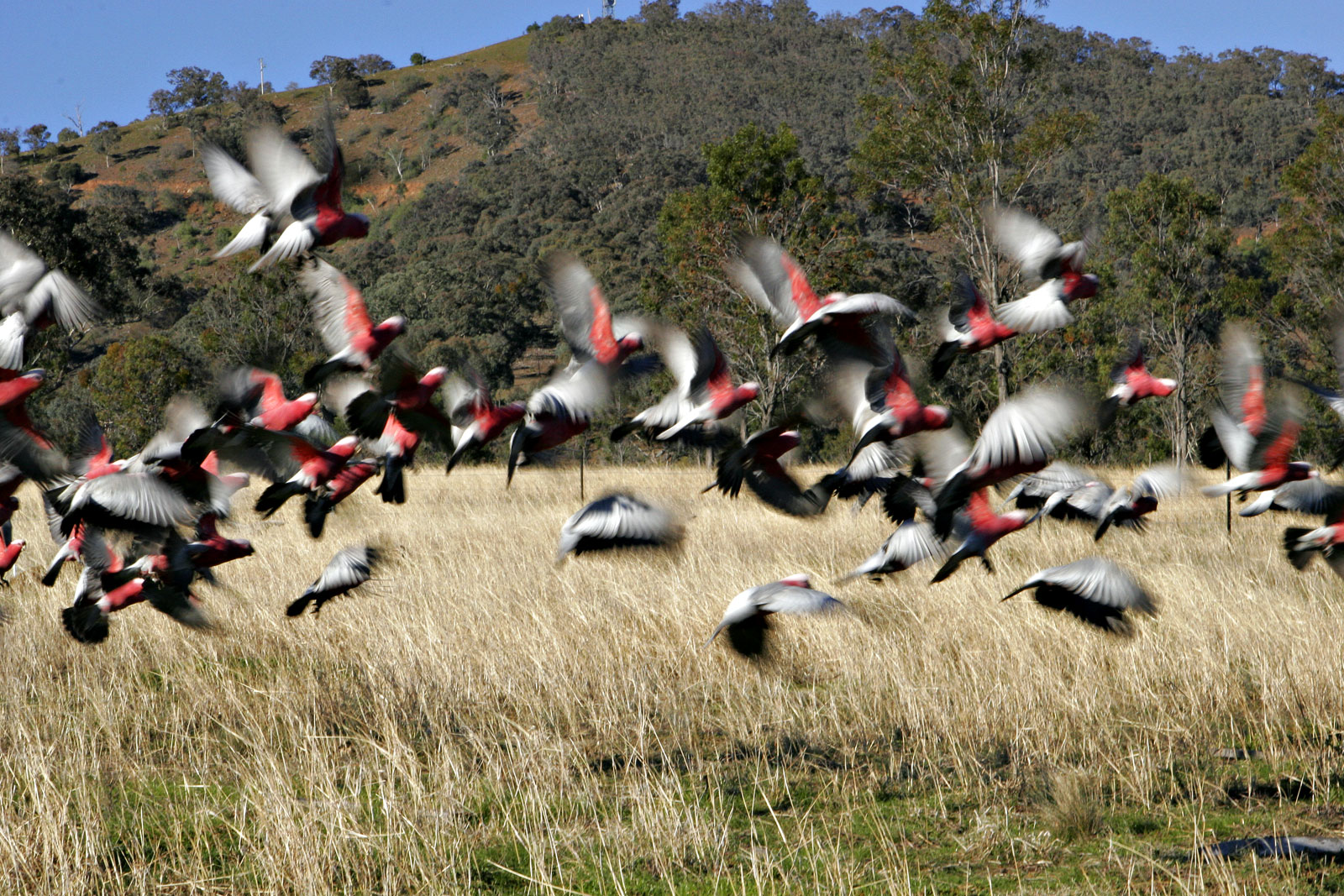
A flock of galahs

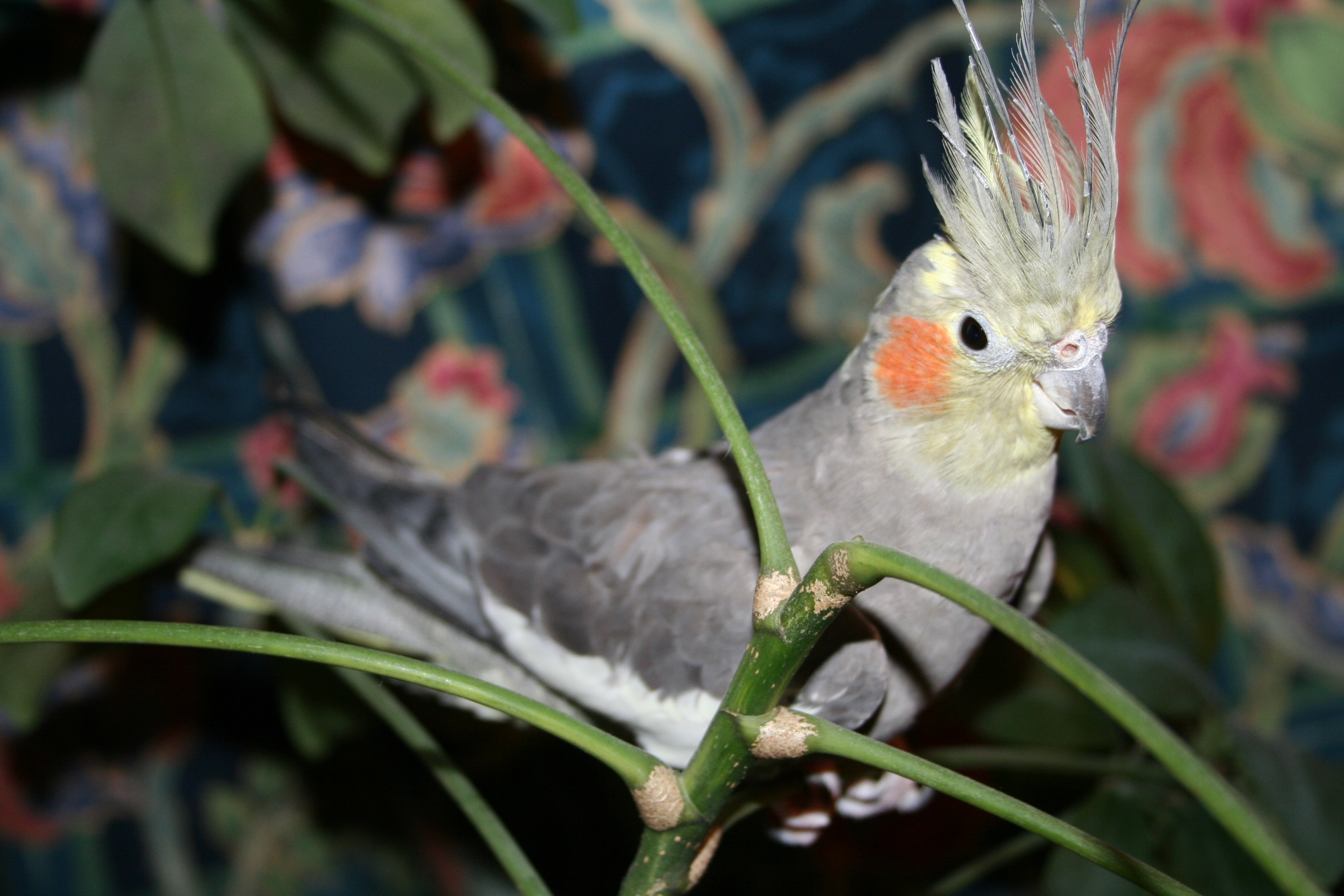
A cockatiel

Australia and its offshore islands and territories have 898 recorded bird species as of 2014. Of the recorded birds, 165 are considered vagrant or accidental visitors, of the remainder over 45% are classified as Australian endemics: found nowhere else on earth. It has been suggested that up to 10% of Australian bird species may go extinct by the year 2100 as a result of climate change. Recent comprehensive assessments show that the overall extinction risk for the nation's avifauna is accelerating, driven by both external environmental threats and intrinsic biological vulnerabilities.

Australian species range from the tiny 8 cm (3.1 in) weebill to the huge, flightless emu. Many species of Australian birds will immediately seem familiar to visitors from the Northern Hemisphere: Australian wrens look and act much like northern wrens, and Australian robins seem to be close relatives of the northern robins. However, the majority of Australian passerines are descended from the ancestors of the crow family, and the close resemblance is misleading: the cause is not genetic relatedness but convergent evolution.

For example, almost any land habitat offers a nice home for a small bird that specialises in finding small insects: the form best fitted to that task is one with long legs for agility and obstacle clearance, moderately-sized wings optimised for quick, short flights, and a large, upright tail for rapid changes of direction. In consequence, the unrelated birds that fill that role in the Americas and in Australia look and act as though they are close relatives.

Australian birds which show convergent evolution with Northern Hemisphere species:

- honeyeaters (resemble sunbirds)
- sittellas (resemble nuthatches)
- Australasian babblers (resemble scimitar babblers)
- Australian robins (resemble Old World chats)
- Scrub robins (resemble thrushes)

== Kinds of birds ==
Australian birds can be classified into six categories:

- Old endemics: long-established non-passerines of ultimately Gondwanan origin, notably emus, cassowaries and the huge parrot group
- Corvid radiation: Passerines peculiar to Australasia, descended from the crow family, and now occupying a vast range of roles and sizes; examples include wrens, robins, magpies, thornbills, pardalotes, the huge honeyeater family, treecreepers, lyrebirds, birds-of-paradise and bowerbirds
- Eurasian colonists: later colonists from Eurasia, including plovers, swallows, larks, thrushes, cisticolas, sunbirds and some raptors
- Recent introductions: birds recently introduced by humans; some, such as the European goldfinch and greenfinch, appear to coexist with native fauna; others, such as the common starling, blackbird, house and tree sparrows, and the common myna, are more destructive
- Migratory shorebirds: a suite of waders in the Scolopacidae and Charadriidae families which breed in northern Asia and Alaska and spend the non-breeding season in Australasia
- Seabirds: a large and cosmopolitan group of petrels, albatrosses, sulids, gulls, terns and cormorants, many of which either breed on islands within Australian territory or frequent its coast and territorial waters

== Regional lists ==
For comprehensive regional lists, see:

- List of birds of Australia, covering Australia and its territories
- List of birds of Australia, New Zealand and Antarctica, the HANZAB list for Australia, New Zealand, Antarctica and the surrounding ocean and subantarctic islands.

For Australia's endemic species, see:

- List of endemic birds of Australia

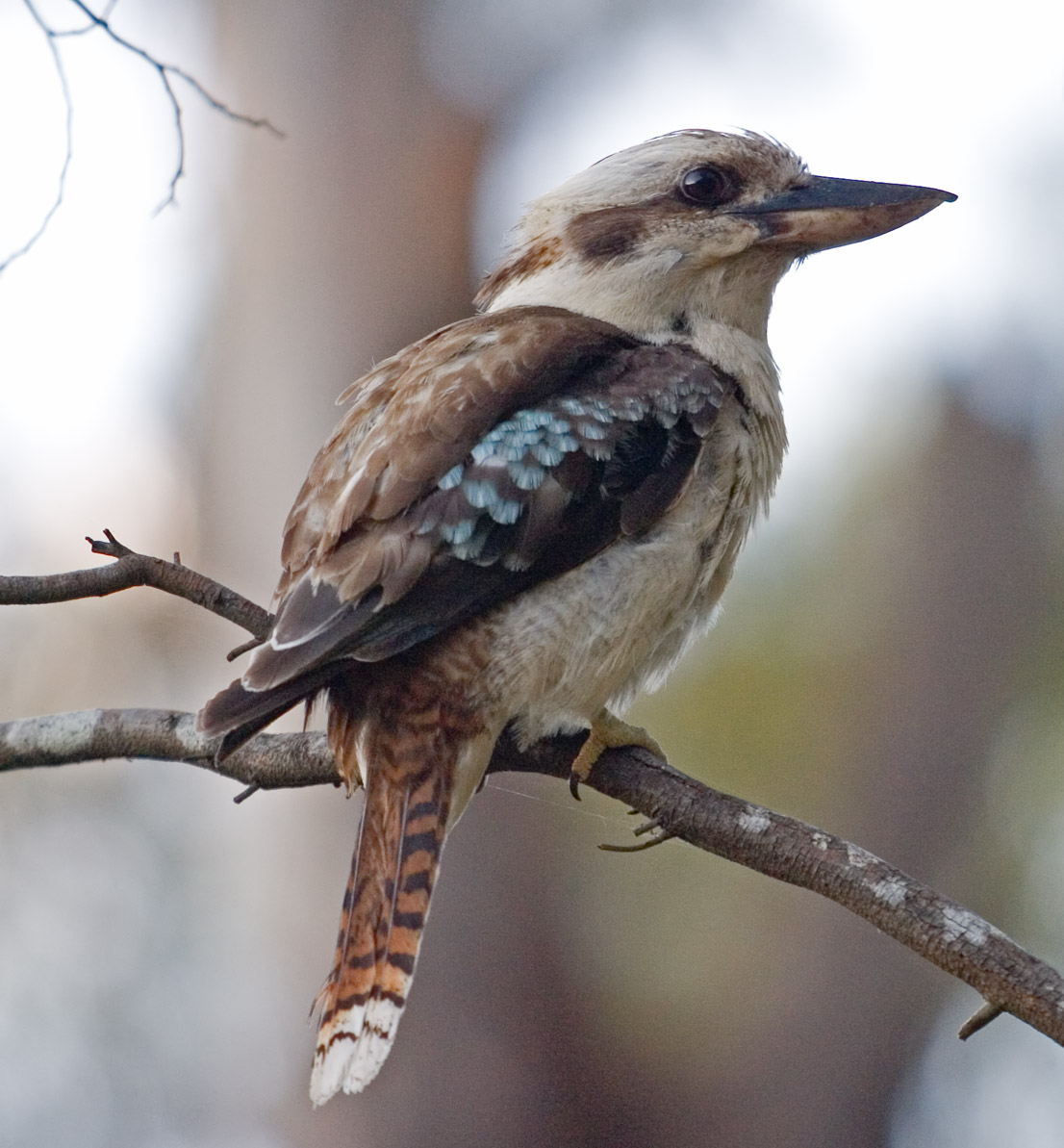
A kookaburra

Other regional, state and island bird lists:

- Victoria
- New South Wales
- Queensland
- Western Australia
- Tasmania
- Northern Territory
- South Australia
- Ashmore Reef
- Boigu, Saibai and Dauan Islands
- Christmas Island
- Cocos (Keeling) Islands
- Heard Island
- Kangaroo Island
- Macquarie Island
- Houtman Abrolhos

== Organisations ==
National organisations

- BirdLife Australia (previously known as Birds Australia) is the leading Australian NGO for birds, birding, ornithology and conservation, formed by a merger of the Royal Australasian Ornithologists Union and Bird Observation & Conservation Australia
- Australian Bird Study Association, for banders and other field ornithologists
- Birding-Aus - an Internet mailing list about Australian birds

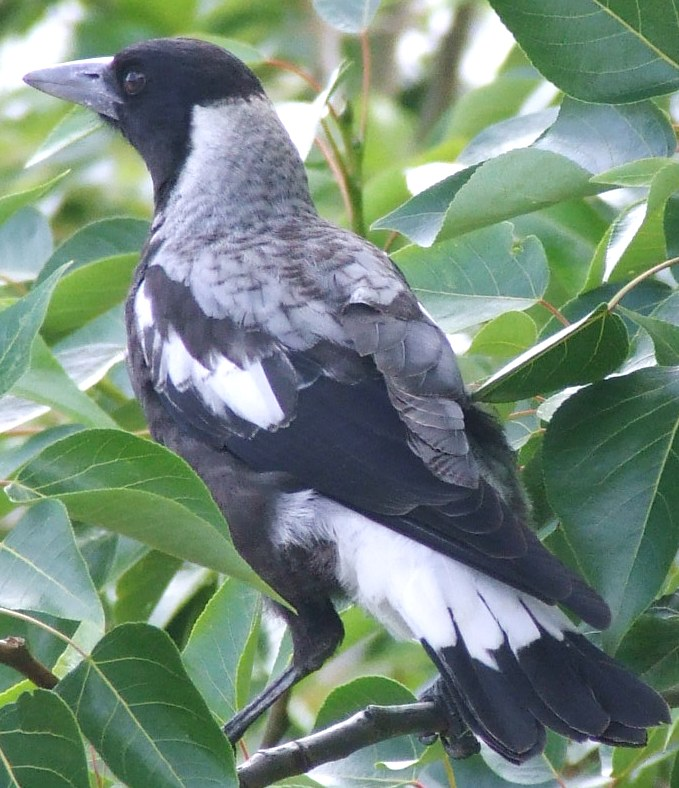
A young Australian magpie

Australian regional and state organisations

- Australian Capital Territory
  - Birds Australia Southern NSW & ACT
  - Canberra Ornithologists Group
- New South Wales
  - NSW Bird Atlassers Inc.
  - Birding NSW
  - Birds Australia Northern NSW
  - Birds Australia Southern NSW & ACT
  - Cumberland Bird Observers Club
  - Blue Mountains Bird Observers Inc.
- Queensland
  - Birds Australia Capricornia
  - Birds Australia North Queensland
  - Birds Australia Southern Queensland
  - Birds Queensland
- South Australia
  - Birds SA
- Tasmania
  - Birds Tasmania
- Victoria
  - Birds Australia - Victoria
- Western Australia
  - Birds Australia Western Australia

== Conservation ==
The conservation status of Australian birds is influenced by a combination of intrinsic biological traits and external environmental threats. Between 1990 and 2020, the overall extinction risk for Australian avifauna increased, with the steepest decline occurring in the most recent decade. During this period, the number of avian taxa moved to higher extinction risk categories vastly exceeded those reassigned to lower categories. The primary drivers of this increased risk included the 2019–2020 wildfires, rapid population declines in migratory shorebirds, and a loss of suitable habitat for upland rainforest species. Furthermore, a comprehensive phylogenetic analysis revealed that intrinsic traits (specifically high evolutionary distinctiveness, island endemism, and an inability to utilise agricultural habitats) predispose certain Australian bird species to a disproportionately elevated extinction risk. Historically, the taxa that have already gone extinct were characterised by large body mass and being restricted to islands.

== Parasites ==
The country does not suffer from several Apicomplexan parasites found throughout the rest of the world. Several species of both avian haemoproteids and avian Plasmodium spp. are absent here.

== Regional references and guides ==
Important regional references include:

- Australia Birds, a portable folding guide authored by zoologist James Kavanagh, features 140 of the most familiar species. Part of a four title series on Australia flora & fauna featuring ecoregions and major bird spotting sites around the country.
- Finding Australian Birds, authored by Tim Dolby and Rohan Clarke (2014), features the best places in Australia for finding birds.
- The Handbook of Australian, New Zealand and Antarctic Birds (HANZAB), the pre-eminent scientific reference, in seven volumes.
- The New Atlas of Australian Birds, an extensive detailed survey of Australian bird distributions.
- The Action Plan for Australian Birds 2000, Garnett, Stephen T.; & Crowley, Gabriel M., Environment Australia, Canberra, 2000 ISBN 0-642-54683-5, a comprehensive survey of the conservation status of Australian species, with costed conservation and recovery strategies.
- Reader's Digest Complete Book of Australian Birds was once the standard general reference, but is now somewhat dated. The second edition (1986) remains in print.
- Where to See Birds in Victoria, edited by Tim Dolby (2009), features places in Victoria for seeing birds.

Full-coverage field guides in print are as follows, in rough order of authority:

- Pizzey: Field Guide to the Birds of Australia, Pizzey, G, Knight, F and Menkhorst, P (ed), 7th edition, 2003 ISBN 978-0-207-19821-2
- Slater: The Slater Field Guide to Australian Birds, Slater P, Slater P and Slater R, 2009 revised edition
- Simpson and Day: Field Guide to the Birds of Australia, Simpson K and Day N, 8th edition, 2010; ISBN 0-670-07231-1
- Morcombe: Field Guide to Australian Birds, Morcombe, M, 2nd edition 2003, and complete compact edition 2004
- Flegg: Photographic Field Guide: Birds of Australia, Flegg, J, 2nd edition, 2002
- Trounson: Australian Birds: A Concise Photographic Field Guide, Trounson D and Trounson M, 2005 reprint
- Cayley: What Bird is That?, Cayley, N, 2000 edition

== Gallery ==
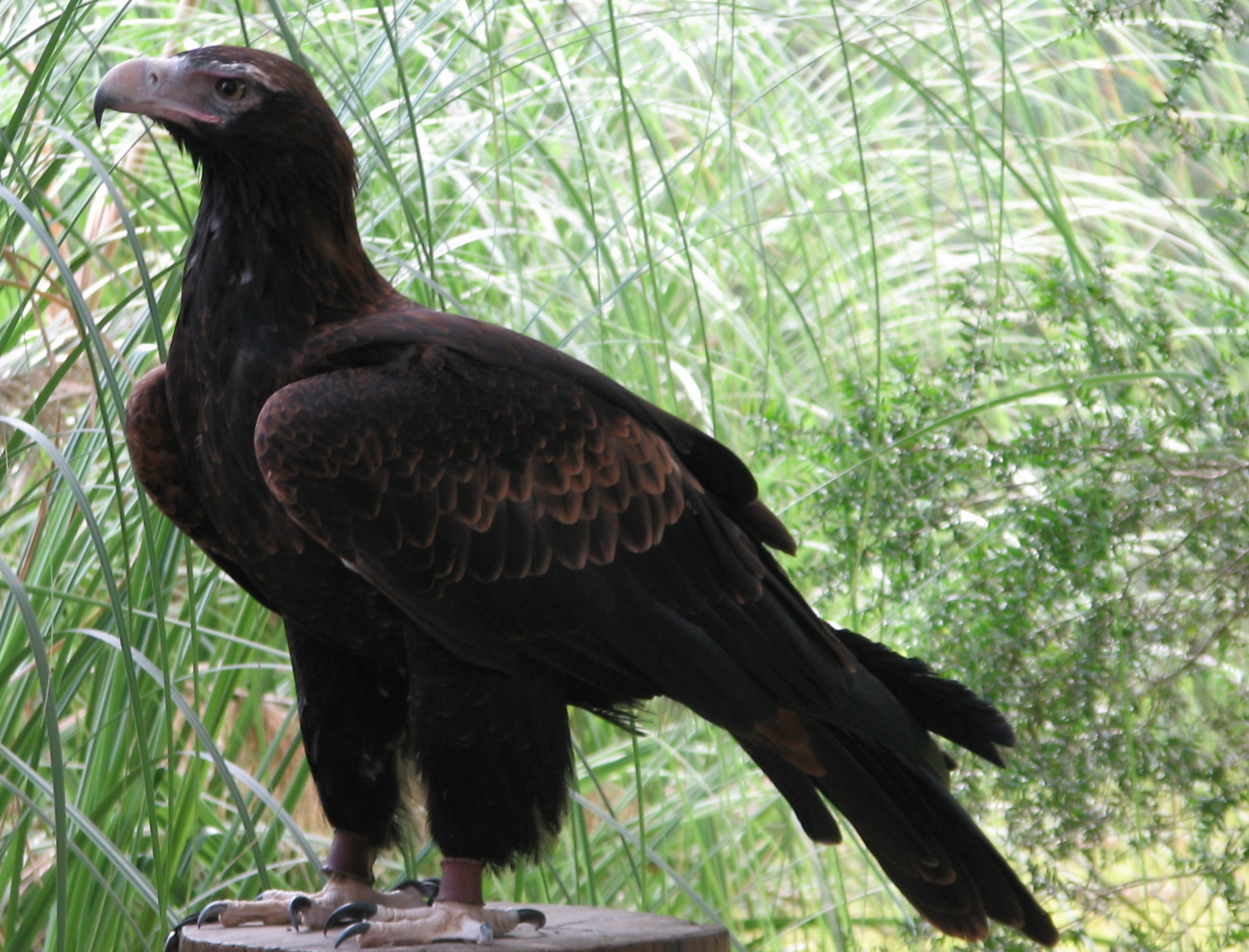
Wedge-tailed eagle

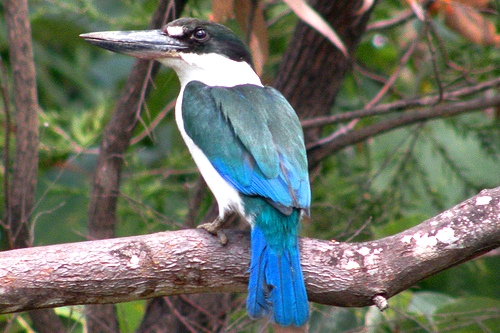
Forest kingfisher

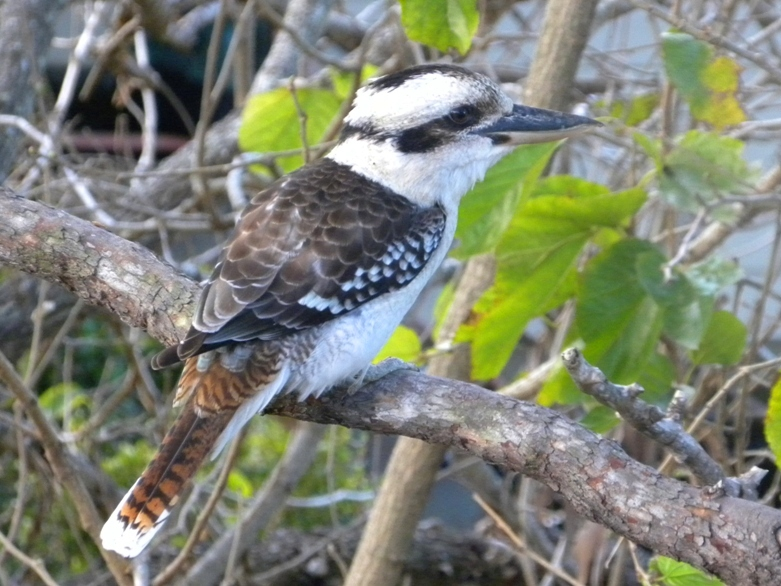
Kookaburra

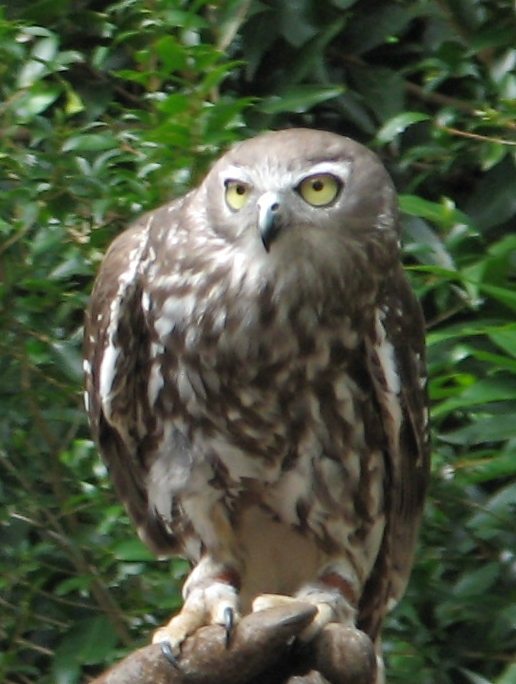
Barking owl

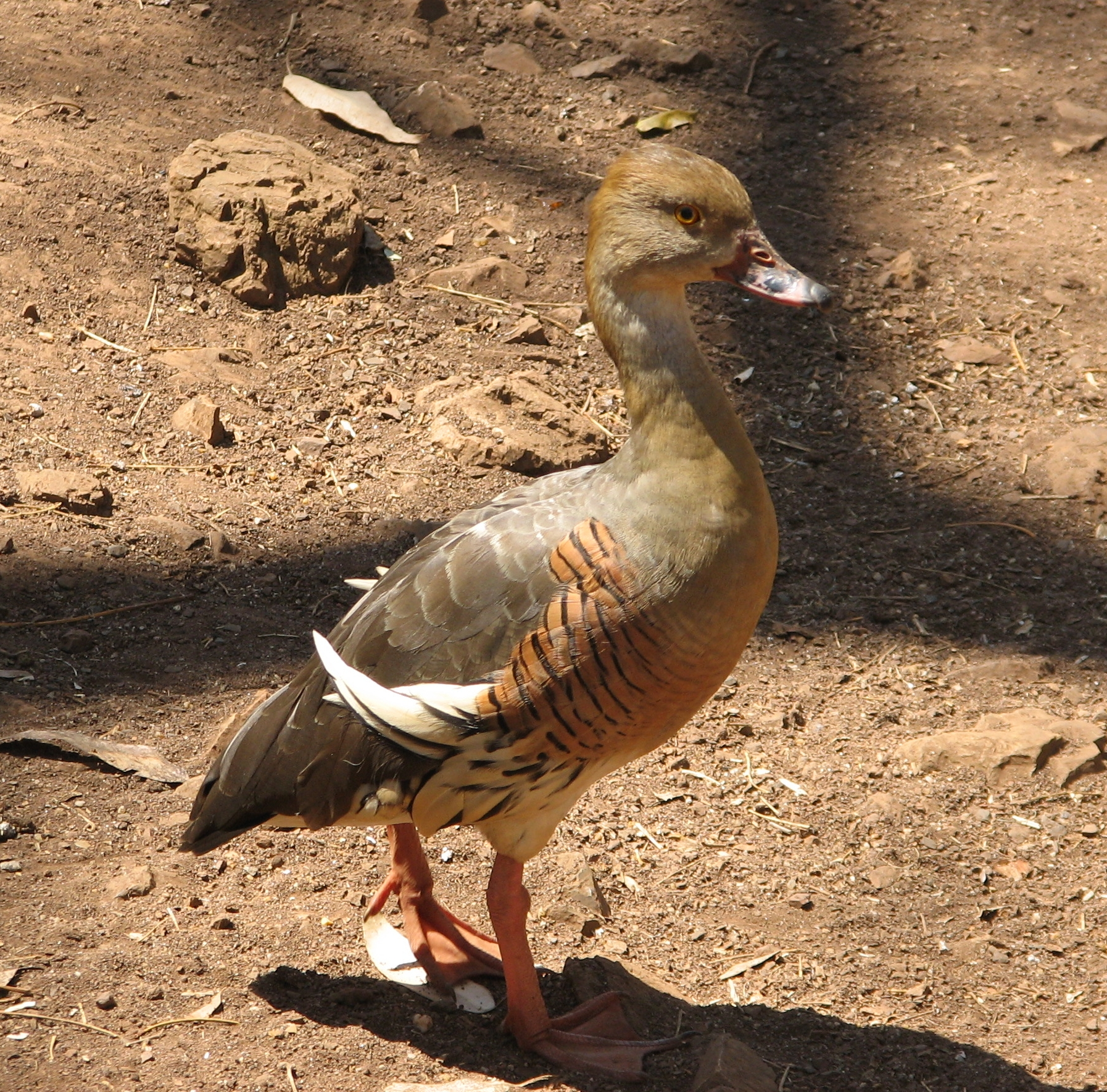
Plumed whistling duck

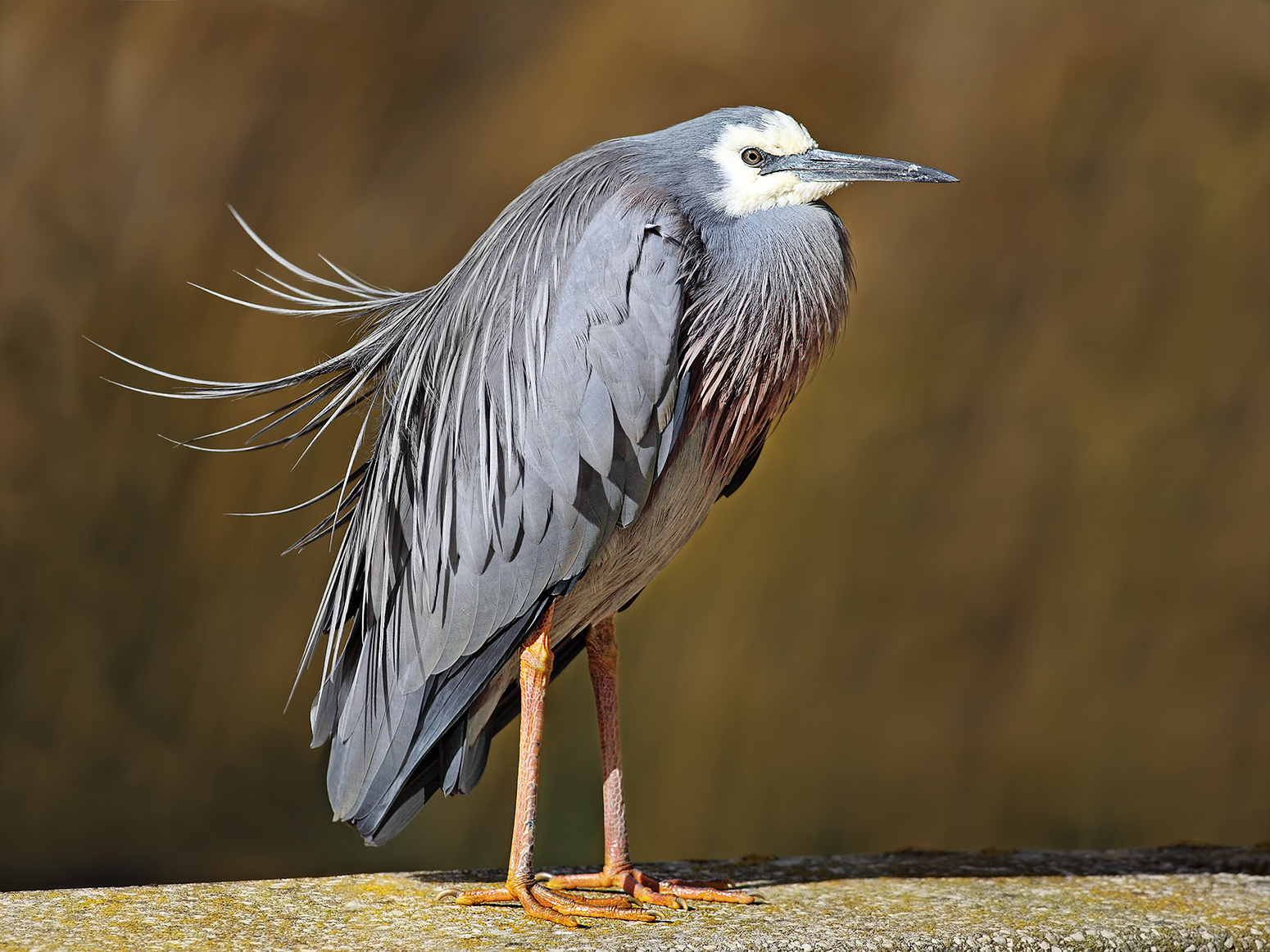
White-faced heron

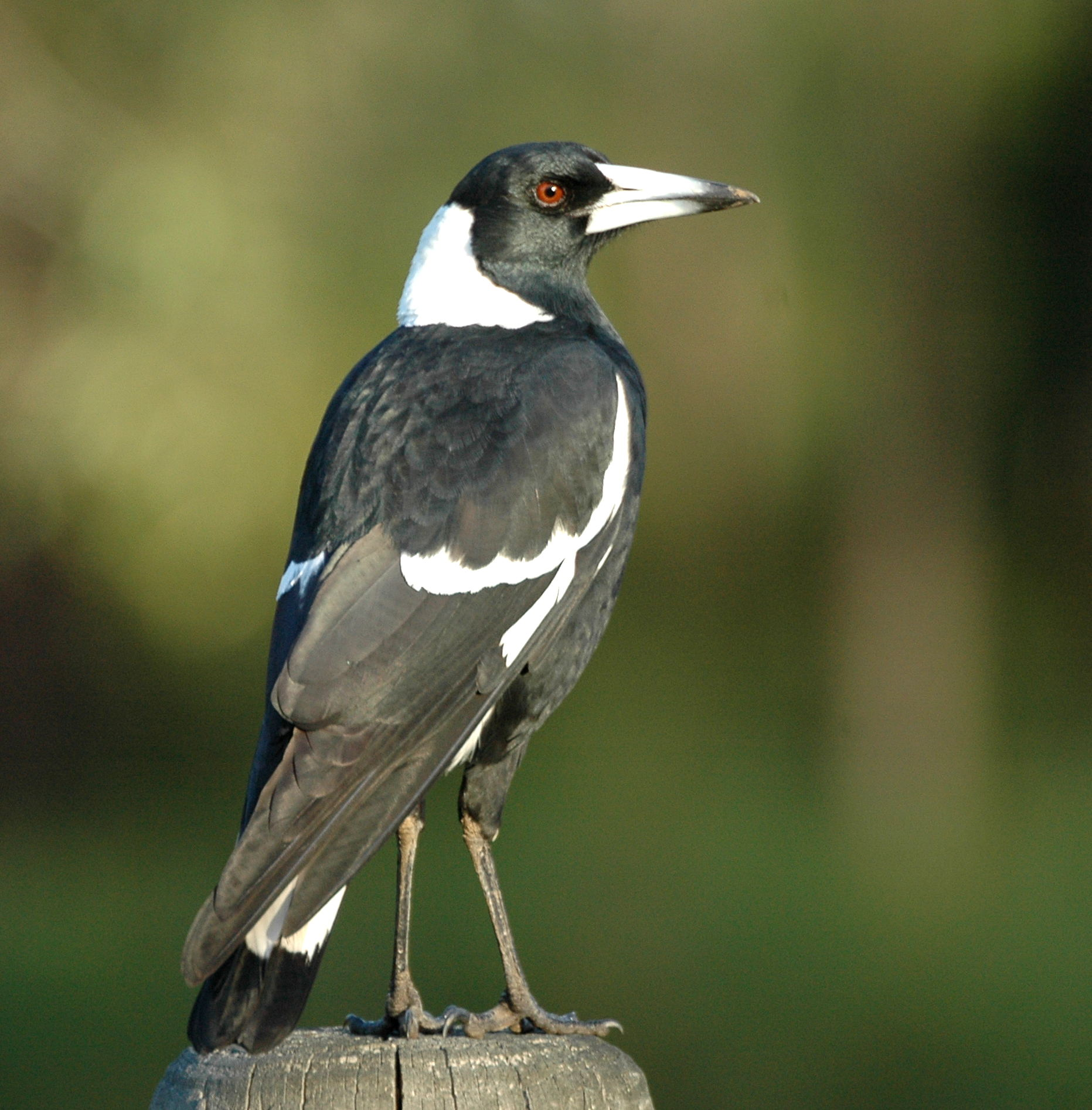
Australian magpie

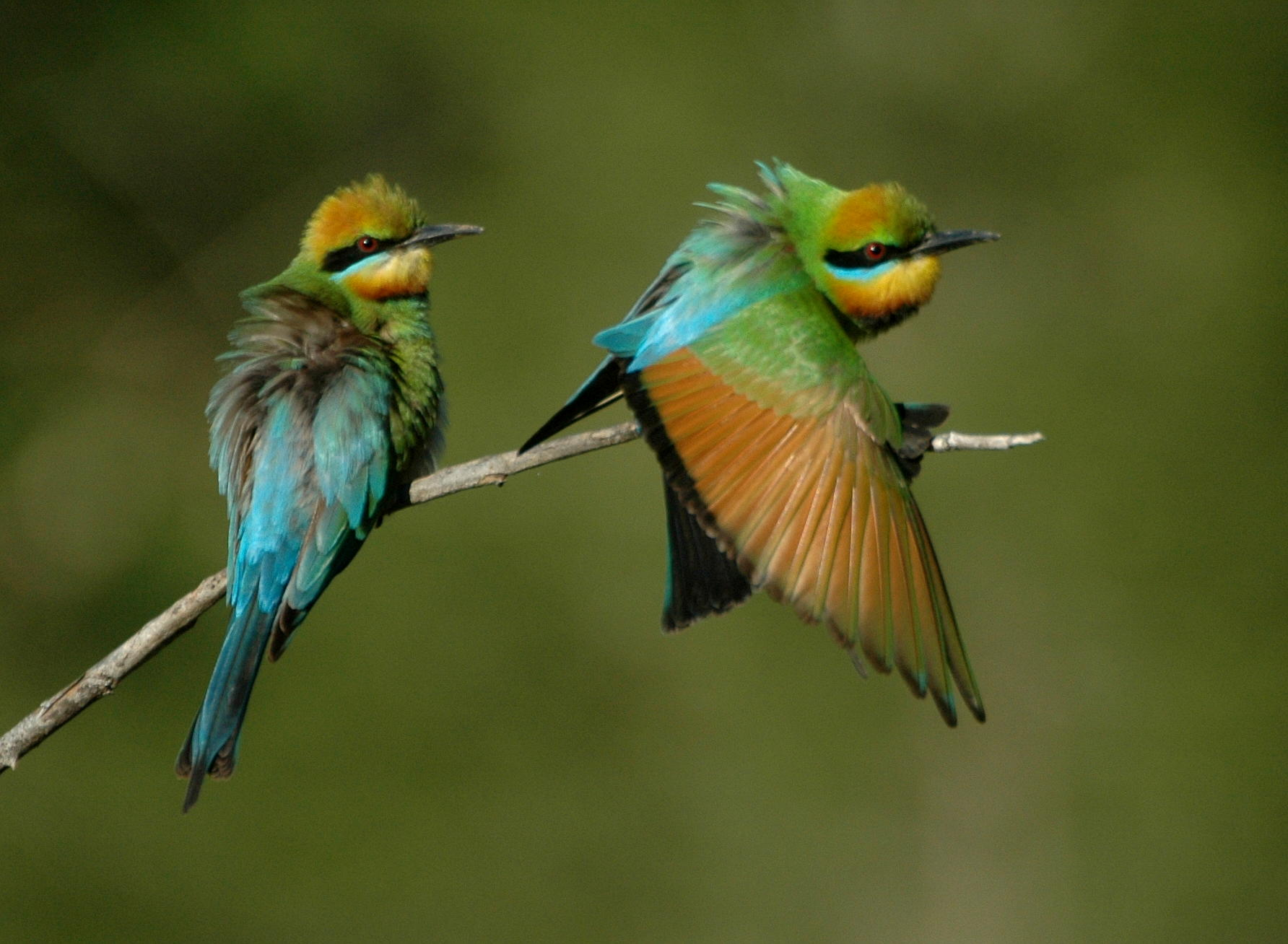
Rainbow bee-eater

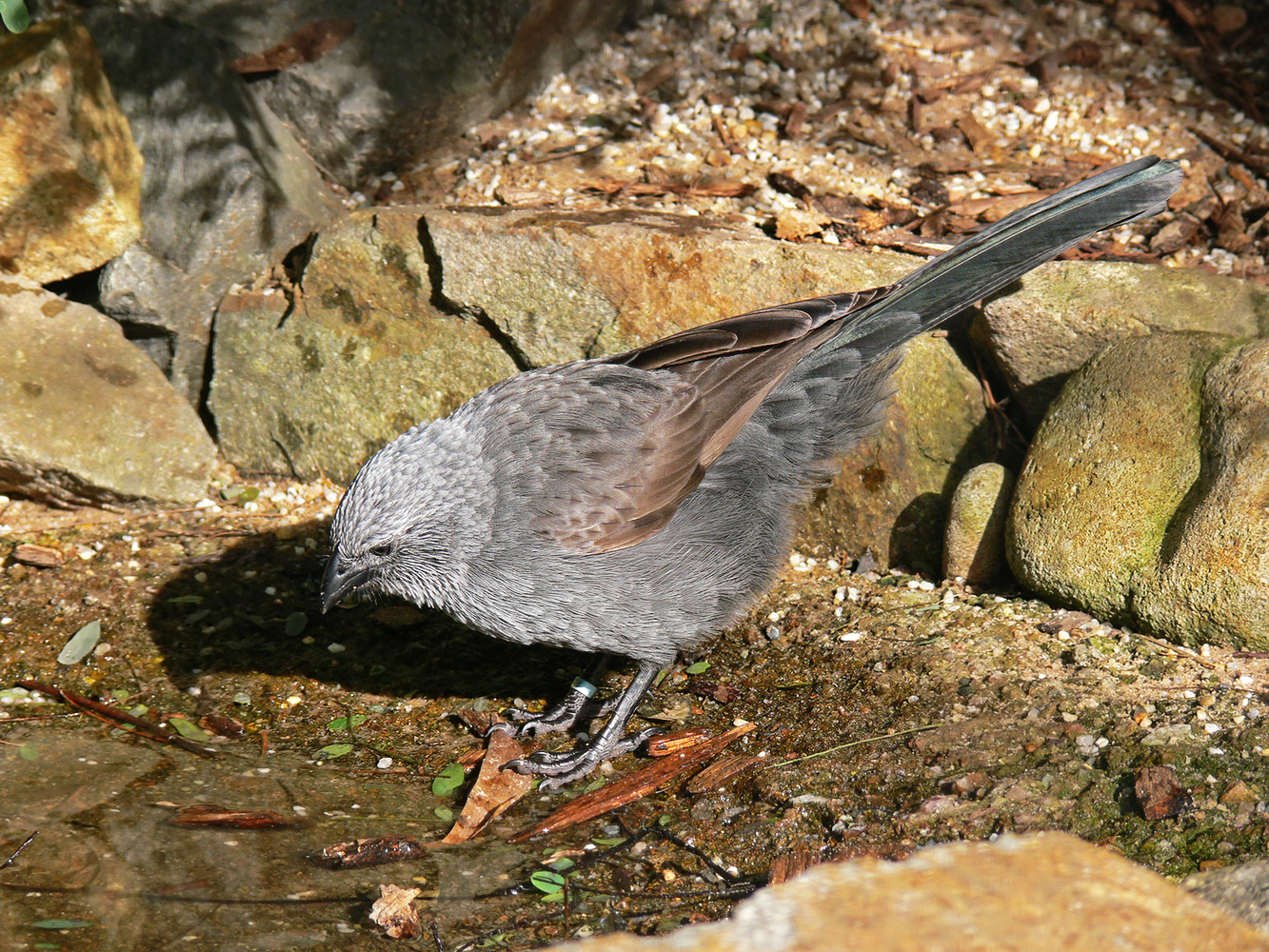
Apostlebird

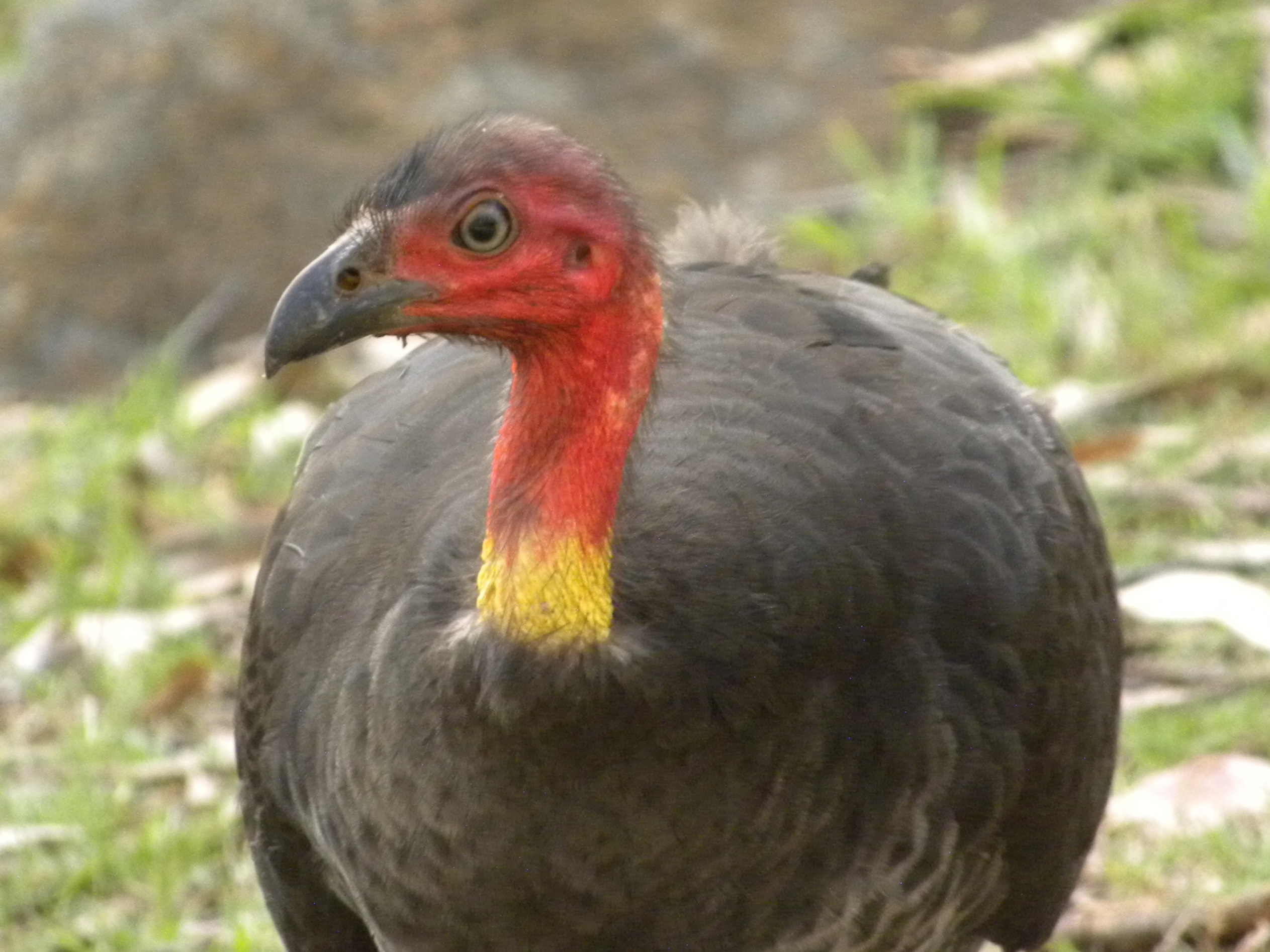
Australian brush turkey

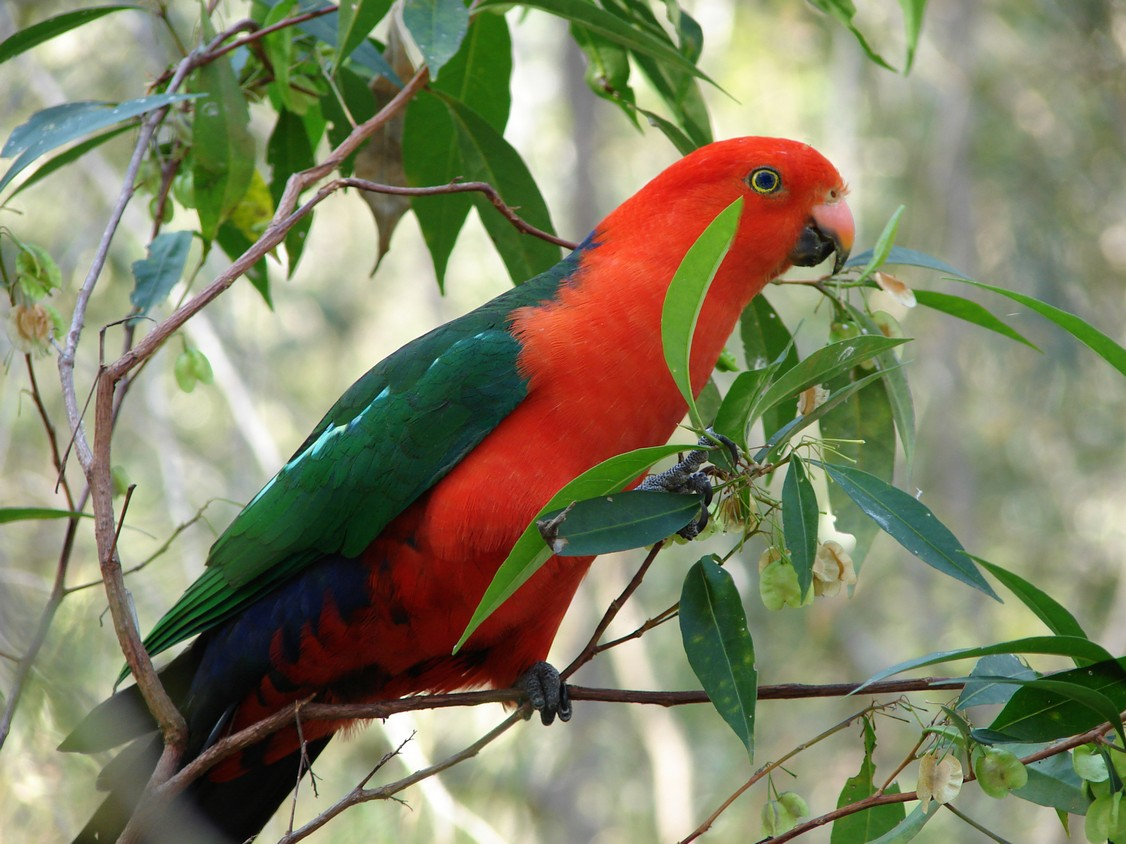
Australian king parrot

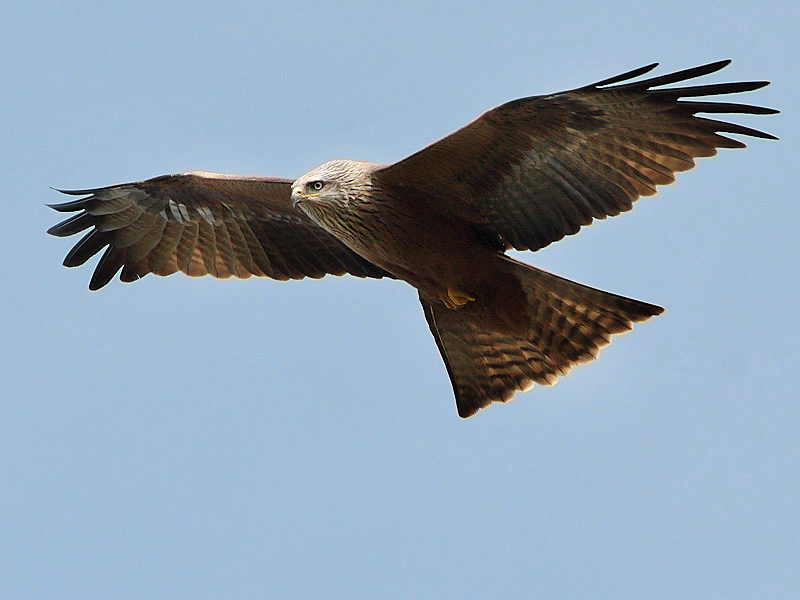
Black kite

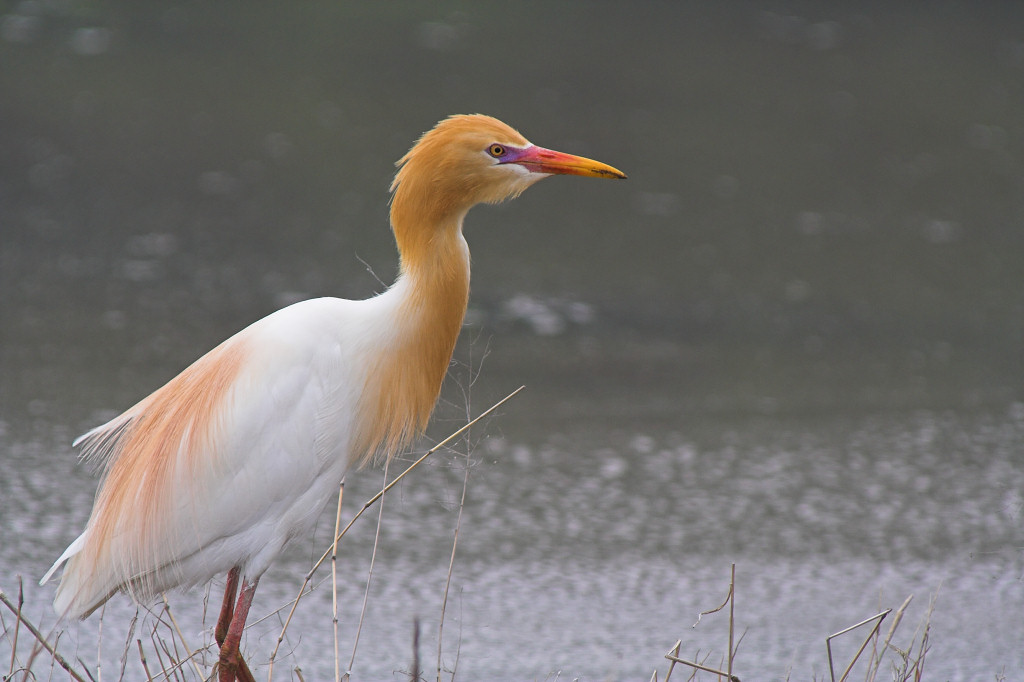
Cattle egret

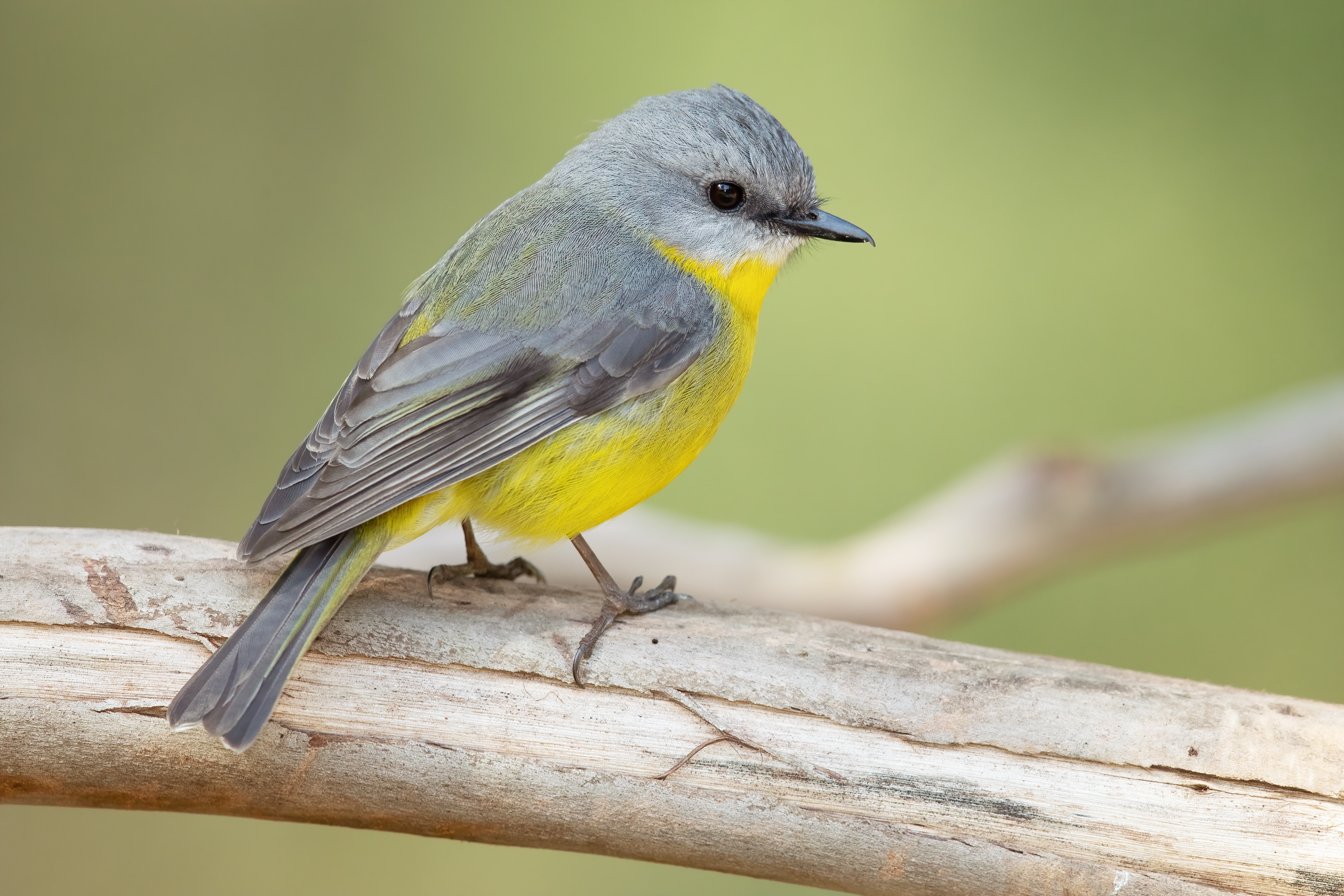
Eastern yellow robin

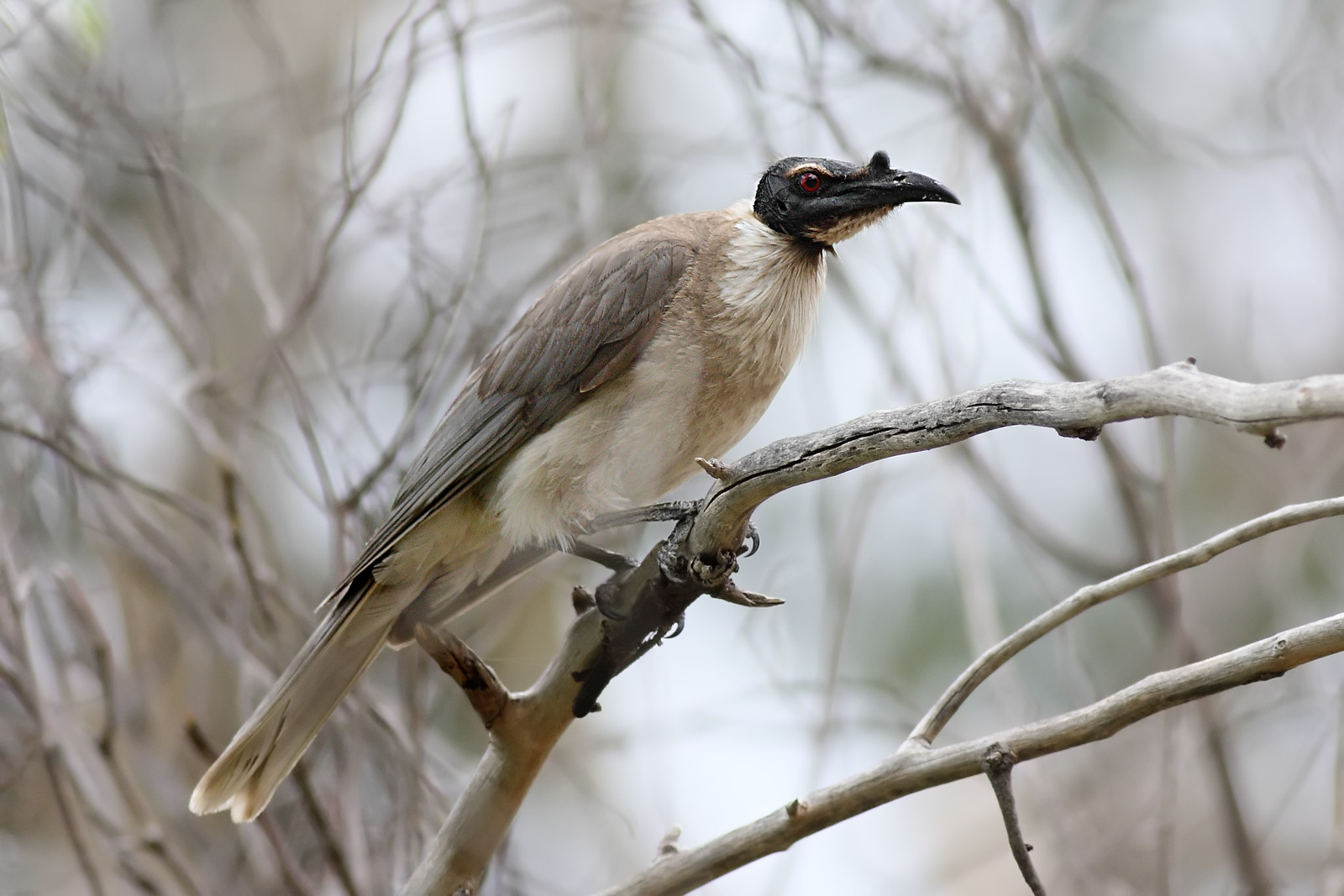
Noisy friarbird

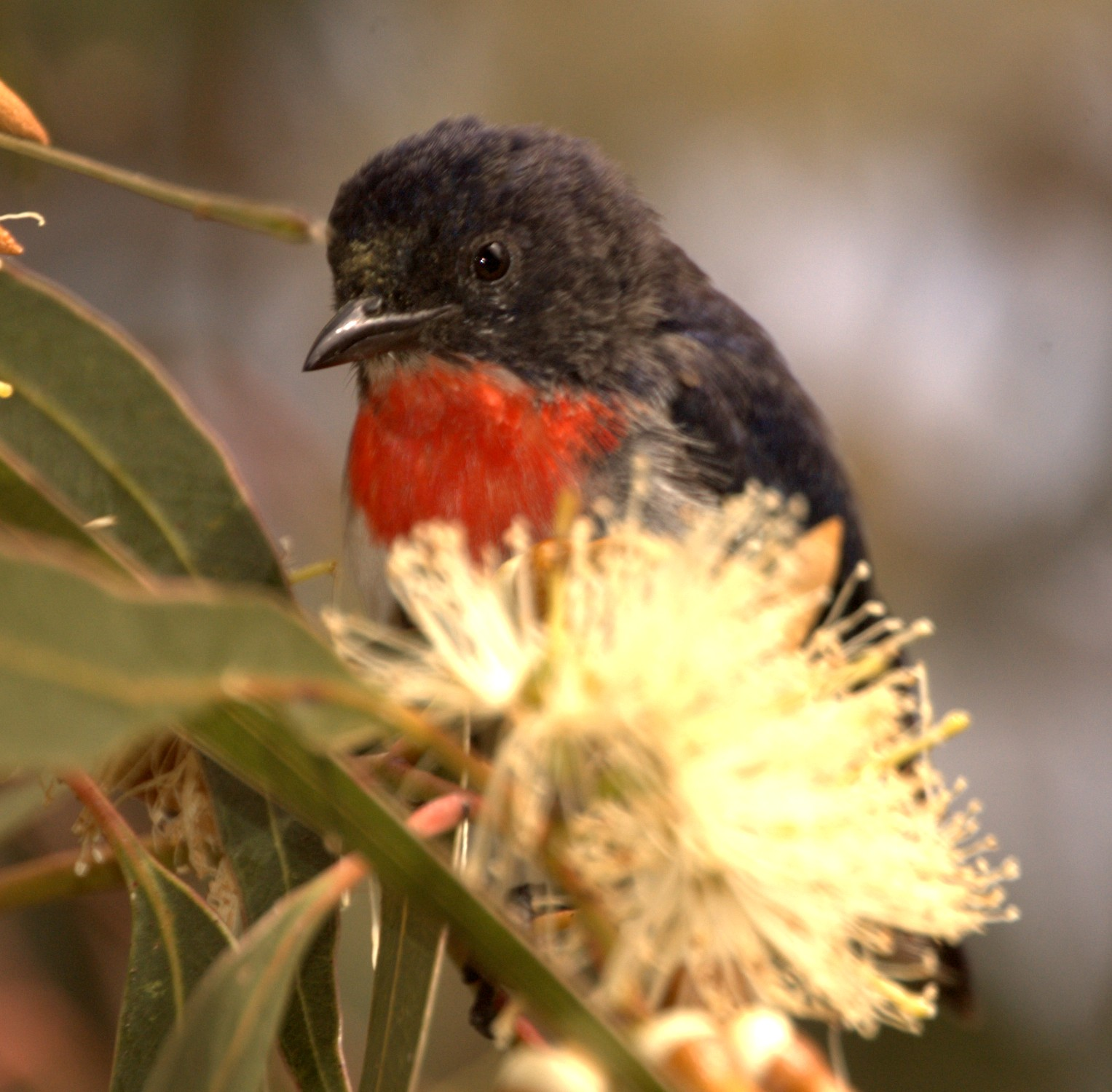
Mistletoebird

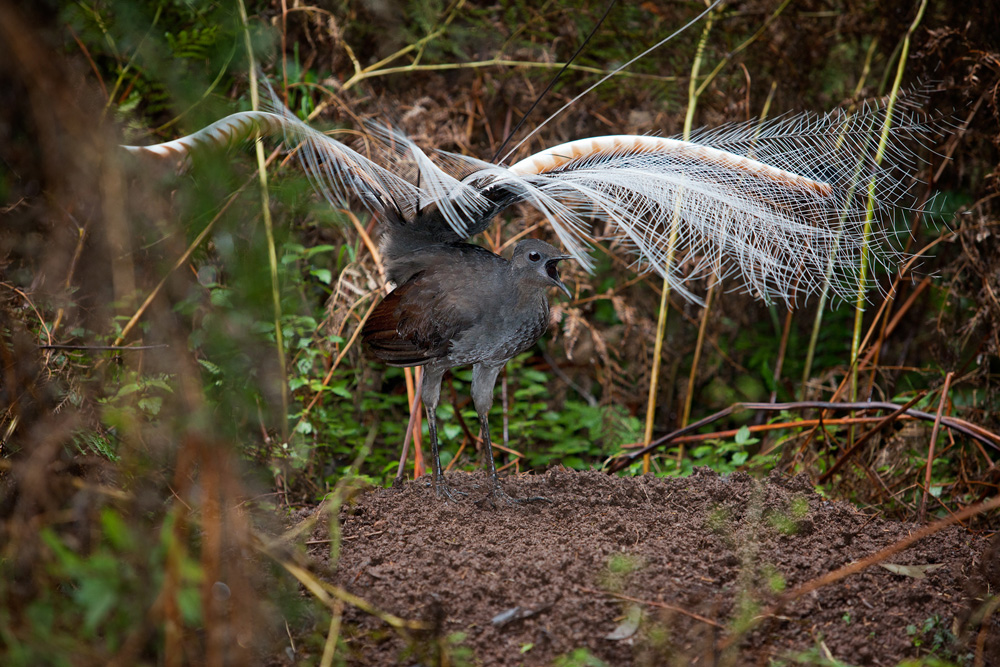
Superb lyrebird

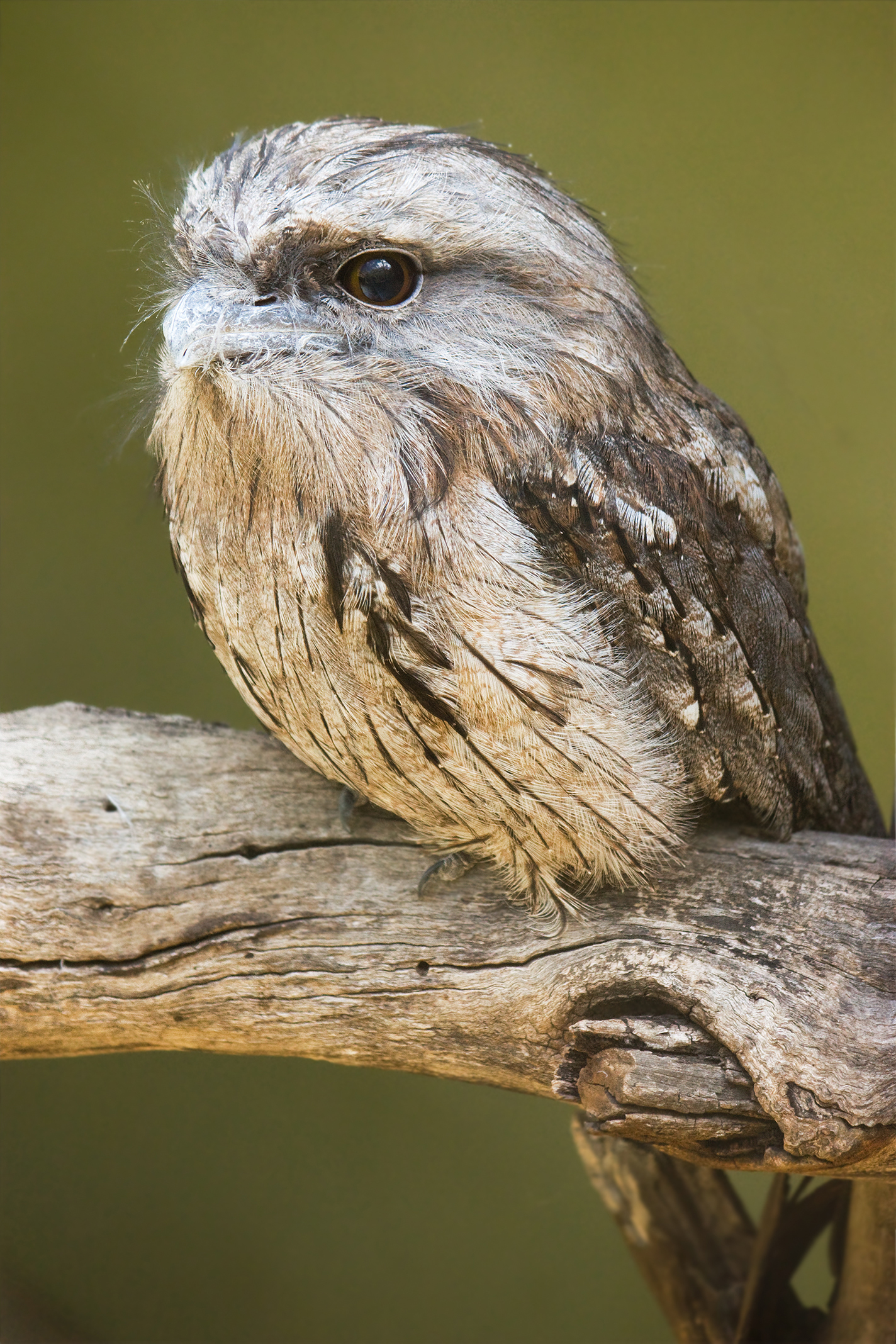
Tawny frogmouth
