= Myuna Farm =

Coordinates: 37°59′11″S 145°13′55″E

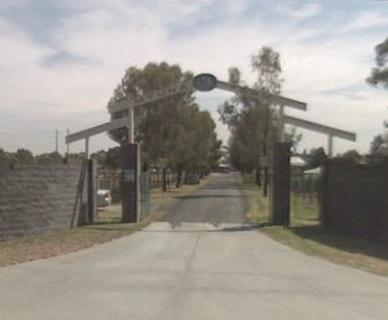
Myuna Farm entrance, 2009

Myuna Farm is a public community farm situated in Doveton, Victoria, Australia, alongside the Dandenong Creek. It includes a wetland environment located within a suburb.

== Activities ==
The farm includes a train that takes visitors to the outer sections of the farm, where the largest grey-headed flying fox colony in Melbourne is located.

The farm is a venue oriented toward children and hosts an annual Christmas carol event. It also hosts the "Dovetown Show" which is a volunteer-run community event coinciding with the Melbourne Show.

The farm features an animal nursery for visitors to interact with baby animals, bird aviaries housing a collection of Australian birds, and paddocks housing a range of animals, including endemic species such as emus and kangaroos.
