= List of birds of Macquarie Island =

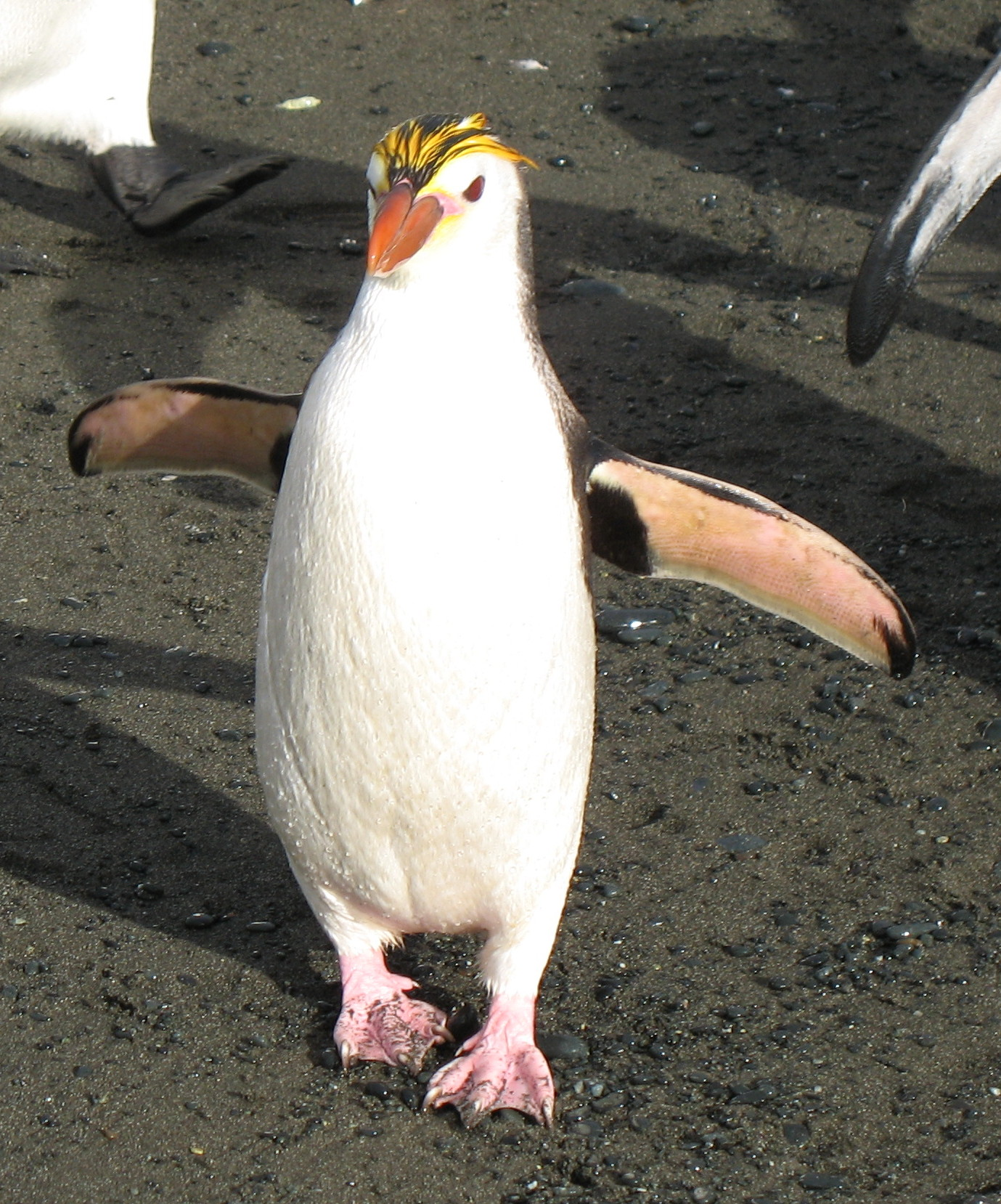
A royal penguin on Macquarie Island.

This is a list of the bird species recorded on Macquarie Island. The avifauna of Macquarie Island include a total of 74 species, of which 6 have been introduced. Of these, 8 species are globally threatened.

The birds of Macquarie Island are, unsurprisingly for an isolated oceanic island, predominantly seabirds. By far the majority of the breeding species are penguins, petrels and albatrosses. However, the bird list includes many vagrants, including passerines, from New Zealand and Australia.

== Overview ==
Four species of penguin breed on Macquarie Island. The royal penguin has a population estimated at 850,000. There are also 100,000 breeding pairs of king penguin, the third largest such colony in the world. Gentoo and southern rockhopper penguins also breed there. In the past the penguins, mainly the royal and king penguins, were exploited for their oil, a practice which ceased in 1919.

The four breeding species of albatross are all threatened by long-line fishing when feeding away from the island, including the most numerous, the light-mantled sooty albatross with 2000 breeding pairs, and the wandering albatross, with fewer than ten pairs breeding each year.

Many species of petrel breed on Macquarie. They were adversely affected by the introduction of black rats, house mice, rabbits and cats, and the small blue petrel breeding population on the island was critically endangered: in the 1900s, the species was extinct on the main island, with still 500–600 pairs on stacks. Wekas were introduced by sealers in the mid-19th century and flourished, adding to the predation threat, while the rabbits caused erosion of the hillsides. After the eradication of first the cats and the wekas, and then of the rabbits and rodents by 2014, the breeding petrel populations begin to recover, and the blue petrels are no longer vulnerable.

The Macquarie Island parakeet became extinct about 1891. The Macquarie Island rail, an endemic subspecies of the buff-banded rail, disappeared about the same time. The Pacific black duck population on Macquarie Island is threatened by crossbreeding with introduced mallards, a common problem on Australian and New Zealand islands.

This list's taxonomic treatment (designation and sequence of orders, families and species) and nomenclature (common and scientific names) follow the conventions of The Clements Checklist of Birds of the World, 2022 edition. The family accounts at the beginning of each heading reflect this taxonomy, as do the species counts found in each family account. Introduced and accidental species are included in the total counts for French Polynesia.

The following tags have been used to highlight several categories. The commonly occurring native species do not fall into any of these categories.

- (A) Accidental - a species that rarely or accidentally occurs on Macquarie Island
- (E) Endemic - a species that is native only to Macquarie Island
- (I) Introduced - a species introduced to Macquarie Island as a consequence, direct or indirect, of human actions

== Ducks, geese, and waterfowl ==
Order: Anseriformes Family: Anatidae

Anatidae includes the ducks and most duck-like waterfowl, such as geese and swans. These birds are adapted to an aquatic existence with webbed feet, flattened bills, and feathers that are excellent at shedding water due to an oily coating.

- Pacific black duck, Anas superciliosa
- Domestic mallard Anas platyrhynchos (I)
- Mallard × Pacific black duck hybrid, Anas platyrhynchos × superciliosa (I)
- Grey teal, Anas gracilis (A)

== Swifts ==
Order: Caprimulgiformes Family: Apodidae

Swifts are small birds which spend the majority of their lives flying. These birds have very short legs and never settle voluntarily on the ground, perching instead only on vertical surfaces. Many swifts have long swept-back wings which resemble a crescent or boomerang.

- White-throated needletail, Hirundapus caudacutus (A)
- Pacific swift, Apus pacificus (A)

== Rails, gallinules, and coots ==
Order: Gruiformes Family: Rallidae

Rallidae is a large family of small to medium-sized birds which includes the rails, crakes, coots and gallinules. Typically they inhabit dense vegetation in damp environments near lakes, swamps or rivers. In general they are shy and secretive birds, making them difficult to observe. Most species have strong legs and long toes which are well adapted to soft uneven surfaces. They tend to have short, rounded wings and to be weak fliers.

- Eurasian coot, Fulica atra (A)
- Baillon's crake, Zapornia pusilla (A)

== Sandpipers and allies ==
Order: Charadriiformes Family: Scolopacidae

Scolopacidae is a large diverse family of small to medium-sized shorebirds including the sandpipers, curlews, godwits, shanks, tattlers, woodcocks, snipes, dowitchers and phalaropes. The majority of these species eat small invertebrates picked out of the mud or soil. Variation in length of legs and bills enables multiple species to feed in the same habitat, particularly on the coast, without direct competition for food.

- Ruddy turnstone, Arenaria interpres (A)
- Latham's snipe, Gallinago hardwickii (A)

== Skuas and jaegers ==
Order: Charadriiformes Family: Stercorariidae

The family Stercorariidae are, in general, medium to large birds, typically with grey or brown plumage, often with white markings on the wings. They nest on the ground in temperate and arctic regions and are long-distance migrants.

- South polar skua, Stercorarius maccormicki
- Brown skua, Stercorarius antarcticus

== Gulls, terns, and skimmers ==
Order: Charadriiformes Family: Laridae

Laridae is a family of medium to large seabirds, the gulls, terns, and skimmers. Gulls are typically grey or white, often with black markings on the head or wings. They have stout, longish bills and webbed feet. Terns are a group of generally medium to large seabirds typically with grey or white plumage, often with black markings on the head. Most terns hunt fish by diving but some pick insects off the surface of fresh water. Terns are generally long-lived birds, with several species known to live in excess of 30 years.

- Silver gull, Chroicocephalus novaehollandiae (A)
- Kelp gull, Larus dominicanus
- Arctic tern, Sterna paradisaea (A)
- Antarctic tern, Sterna vittata

== Penguins ==
Order: Sphenisciformes Family: Spheniscidae

The penguins are a group of aquatic, flightless birds living almost exclusively in the Southern Hemisphere. Most penguins feed on krill, fish, squid and other forms of sealife caught while swimming underwater.

- King penguin, Aptenodytes patagonicus
- Adelie penguin, Pygoscelis adeliae (A)
- Gentoo penguin, Pygoscelis papua
- Chinstrap penguin, Pygoscelis antarctica (A)
- Erect-crested penguin, Eudyptes sclateri (A)
- Macaroni penguin, Eudyptes chrysolophus
- Royal penguin, Eudyptes schlegeli (E)
- Southern rockhopper penguin, Eudyptes chrysocome
- Snares penguin, Eudyptes robustus (A)

== Albatrosses ==
Order: Procellariiformes Family: Diomedeidae

The albatrosses are among the largest of flying birds, and the great albatrosses from the genus Diomedea have the largest wingspans of any extant birds.

- Gray-headed albatross, Thalassarche chrysostoma
- White-capped albatross, Thalassarche cauta (A)
- Salvin's albatross, Thalassarche salvini (A)
- Black-browed albatross, Thalassarche melanophris
- Light-mantled albatross, Phoebetria palpebrata
- Royal albatross, Diomedea epomophora (A)
- Wandering albatross, Diomedea exulans

== Southern storm-petrels ==
Order: Procellariiformes Family: Oceanitidae

The southern storm-petrels are relatives of the petrels and are the smallest seabirds. They feed on planktonic crustaceans and small fish picked from the surface, typically while hovering. The flight is fluttering and sometimes bat-like.

- Wilson's storm-petrel, Oceanites oceanicus (A)
- Gray-backed storm-petrel, Garrodia nereis (A)
- Black-bellied storm-petrel, Fregetta tropica

== Shearwaters and petrels ==
Order: Procellariiformes Family: Procellariidae

The procellariids are the main group of medium-sized "true petrels", characterised by united nostrils with medium septum and a long outer functional primary.

- Southern giant-petrel, Macronectes giganteus
- Northern giant-petrel, Macronectes halli
- Southern fulmar, Fulmarus glacialoides (A)
- Antarctic petrel, Thalassoica antarctica (A)
- Cape petrel, Daption capense
- Snow petrel, Pagodroma nivea (A)
- Kerguelen petrel, Aphrodroma brevirostris
- Soft-plumaged petrel, Pterodroma mollis
- White-headed petrel, Pterodroma lessonii
- Mottled petrel, Pterodroma inexpectata
- Blue petrel, Halobaena caerulea
- Fairy prion, Pachyptila turtur
- Broad-billed prion, Pachyptila vittata (A)
- Antarctic prion, Pachyptila desolata
- Slender-billed prion, Pachyptila belcheri
- Gray petrel, Procellaria cinerea
- White-chinned petrel, Procellaria aequinoctialis (A)
- Sooty shearwater, Ardenna griseus
- Short-tailed shearwater, Ardenna tenuirostris
- Common diving-petrel, Pelecanoides urinatrix
- South Georgia diving-petrel, Pelecanoides urinatrix

== Cormorants and shags ==
Order: Suliformes Family: Phalacrocoracidae

Phalacrocoracidae is a family of medium to large coastal, fish-eating seabirds that includes cormorants and shags. Plumage colouration varies, with the majority having mainly dark plumage, some species being black-and-white and a few being colourful.

- Macquarie shag, Leucocarbo purpurascens (E)

== Herons, egrets, and bitterns ==
Order: Pelecaniformes Family: Ardeidae

The family Ardeidae contains the bitterns, herons and egrets. Herons and egrets are medium to large wading birds with long necks and legs. Bitterns tend to be shorter necked and more wary. Members of Ardeidae fly with their necks retracted, unlike other long-necked birds such as storks, ibises and spoonbills.

- Great egret, Ardea alba (A)
- Intermediate egret, Ardea intermedia (A)
- White-faced heron, Egretta novaehollandiae (A)
- Little egret, Egretta garzetta (A)
- Cattle egret, Bubulcus ibis (A)

== Hawks, eagles, and kites ==
Order: Accipitriformes Family: Accipitridae

Accipitridae is a family of birds of prey, which includes hawks, eagles, kites, harriers and Old World vultures. These birds have powerful hooked beaks for tearing flesh from their prey, strong legs, powerful talons and keen eyesight.

- Swamp harrier, Circus approximans (A)

== Old World parrots ==
Order: Psittaciformes Family: Psittaculidae

Characteristic features of parrots include a strong curved bill, an upright stance, strong legs, and clawed zygodactyl feet. Many parrots are vividly coloured, and some are multi-coloured. In size they range from 8 cm (3.1 in) to 1 m (3.3 ft) in length. Old World parrots are found from Africa east across south and southeast Asia and Oceania to Australia and New Zealand.

- Macquarie parakeet, Cyanoramphus erythrotis extinct

== Swallows ==
Order: Passeriformes Family: Hirundinidae

The family Hirundinidae is adapted to aerial feeding. They have a slender streamlined body, long pointed wings and a short bill with a wide gape. The feet are adapted to perching rather than walking, and the front toes are partially joined at the base.

- Welcome swallow, Hirundo neoxena (A)

== Starlings ==
Order: Passeriformes Family: Sturnidae

Starlings are small to medium-sized passerine birds. Their flight is strong and direct and they are very gregarious. Their preferred habitat is fairly open country. They eat insects and fruit. Plumage is typically dark with a metallic sheen.

- European starling, Sturnus vulgaris (I)

== Thrushes and allies ==
Order: Passeriformes Family: Turdidae

The thrushes are a group of passerine birds that occur mainly but not exclusively in the Old World. They are plump, soft plumaged, small to medium-sized insectivores or sometimes omnivores, often feeding on the ground. Many have attractive songs.

- Song thrush, Turdus philomelos (A)
- Eurasian blackbird, Turdus merula (I)

== Finches, euphonias, and allies ==
Order: Passeriformes Family: Fringillidae

Finches are seed-eating passerine birds, that are small to moderately large and have a strong beak, usually conical and in some species very large. All have twelve tail feathers and nine primaries. These birds have a bouncing flight with alternating bouts of flapping and gliding on closed wings, and most sing well.

- Common redpoll, Acanthis flammea (I)
- Lesser redpoll, Acanthis cabaret (I)
- European goldfinch, Carduelis carduelis (I)

== See also ==
- List of birds
- Lists of birds by region
