= NSW Field Ornithologists Club =

The NSW Field Ornithologists Club (NSW FOC), also known as Birding NSW, was founded on 21 July 1970 when activities associated with the Royal Australasian Ornithologists Union (RAOU) in New South Wales ceased following drastic reform within the RAOU in the late 1960s which abolished all its branches. Birding NSW publishes a bi-monthly newsletter and holds regular meetings in Sydney and Tuggerah as well as regular field excursions and campouts. The logo of Birding NSW is the azure kingfisher.
