= List of birds of Kangaroo Island, South Australia =

The following is a list of the birds recorded on Kangaroo Island, South Australia.

== Emus ==
- Emu (introduced)
- Kangaroo Island emu (extinct)

== Megapodes ==
- Australian brush-turkey (introduced)

== Gamebirds ==
- Stubble quail
- Brown quail
- Indian peafowl (introduced)
- Common pheasant (introduced)
- Wild turkey (introduced)
- Guineafowl (introduced)

== Wildfowl ==
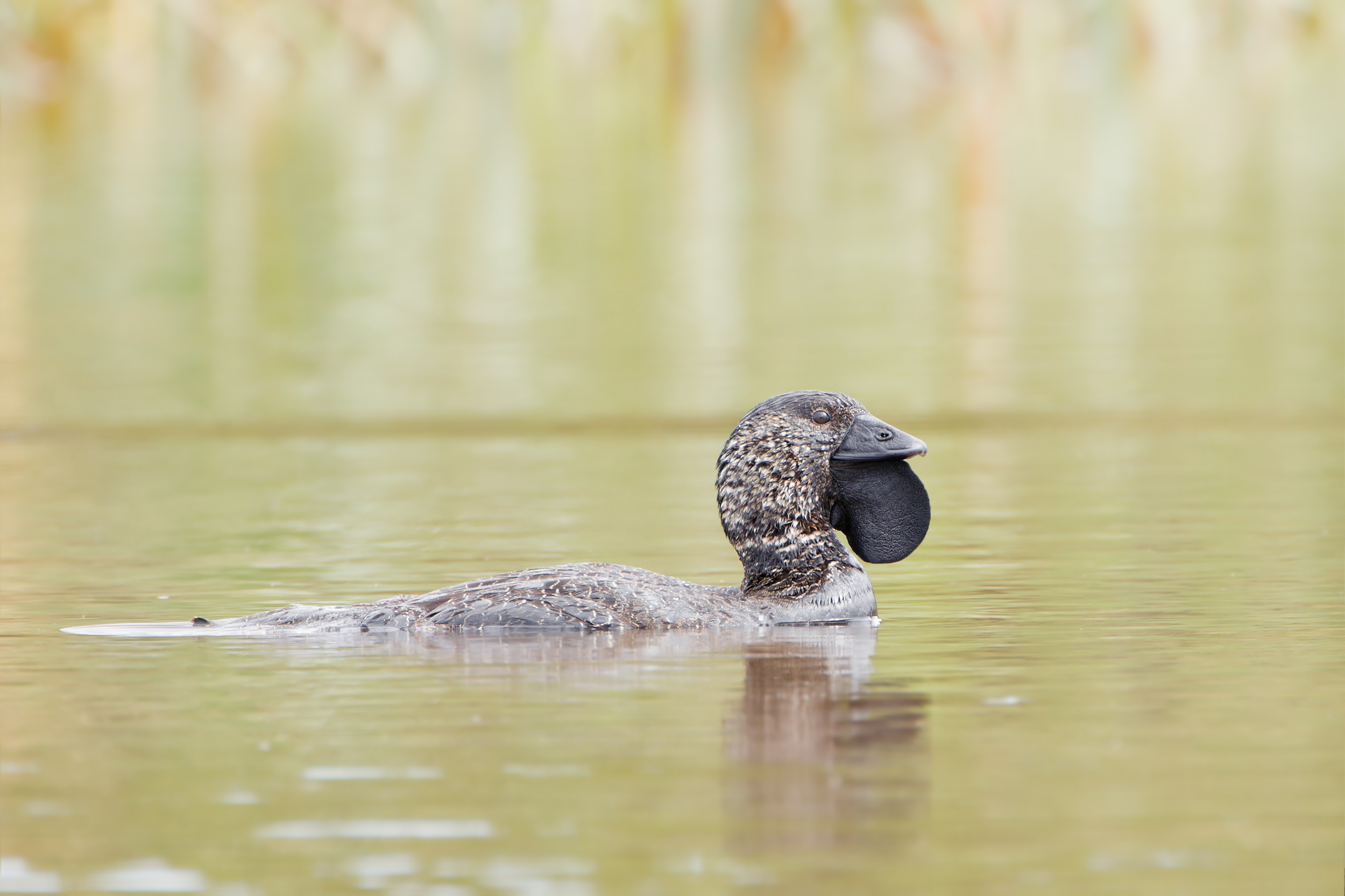
Male Musk Duck (Biziura lobata)

- Blue-billed duck
- Musk duck
- Freckled duck
- Black swan
- Cape Barren goose
- Australian shelduck
- Australian wood duck
- Pacific black duck
- Australian shoveler
- Grey teal
- Chestnut teal
- Garganey (vagrant)
- Pink-eared duck
- Hardhead
- Mallard (introduced)

== Grebes ==
- Australasian grebe
- Hoary-headed grebe
- Great crested grebe

== Penguins ==
- Little penguin
- Fiordland penguin

== Diving-petrels ==
- Common diving-petrel

== Petrels and shearwaters ==
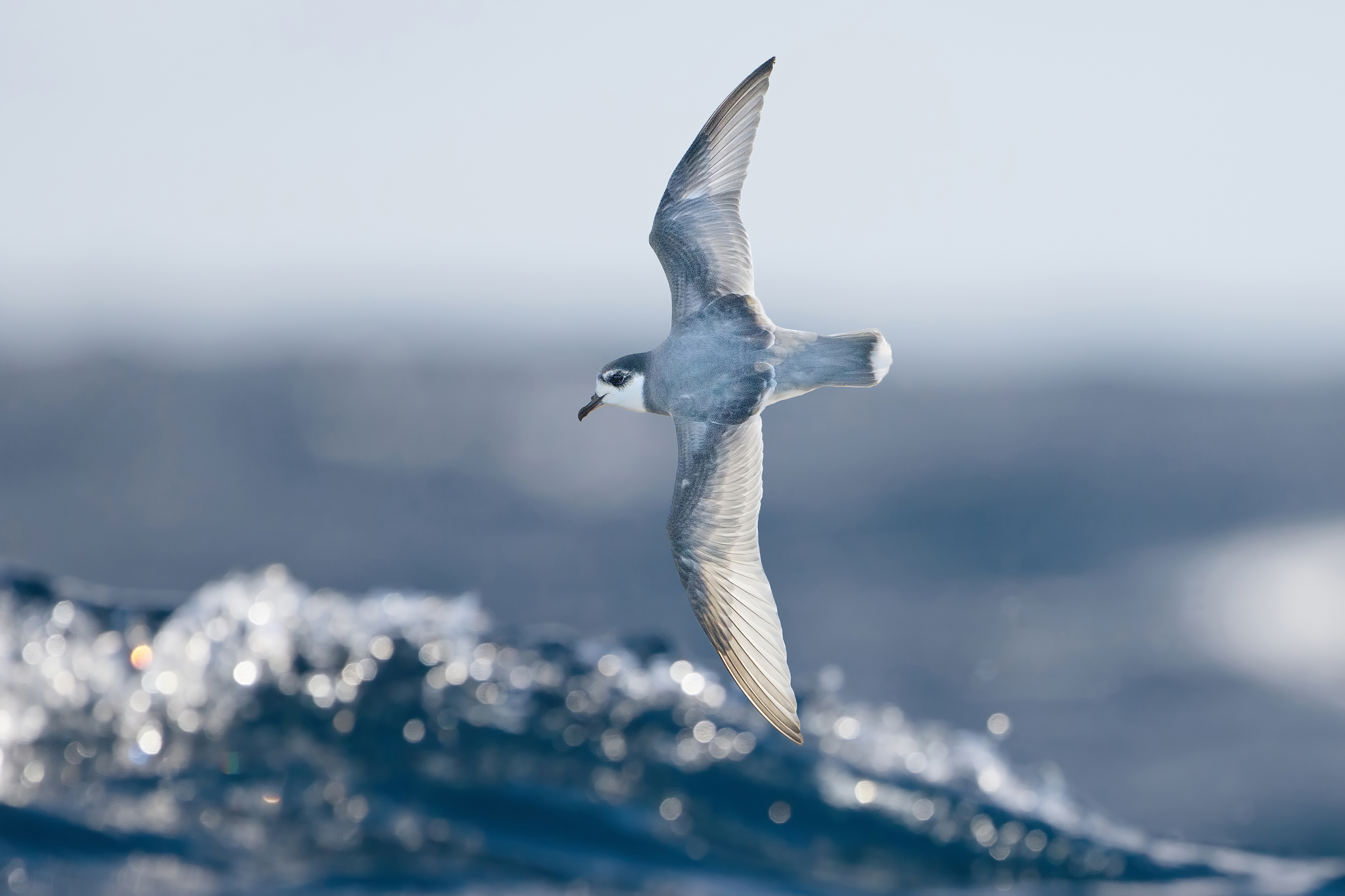
Blue Petrel (Halobaena caerulea)

- Southern giant petrel
- Northern giant petrel
- Southern fulmar
- Cape petrel
- Kerguelen petrel
- Great-winged petrel
- White-headed petrel
- Blue petrel
- Broad-billed prion
- Salvin's prion
- Antarctic prion
- Slender-billed prion
- Fairy prion
- White-chinned petrel
- Mottled petrel
- Grey petrel
- Flesh-footed shearwater
- Short-tailed shearwater (migrates here to breed)
- Fluttering shearwater
- Hutton's shearwater
- Sooty shearwater
- Little shearwater

== Albatrosses ==
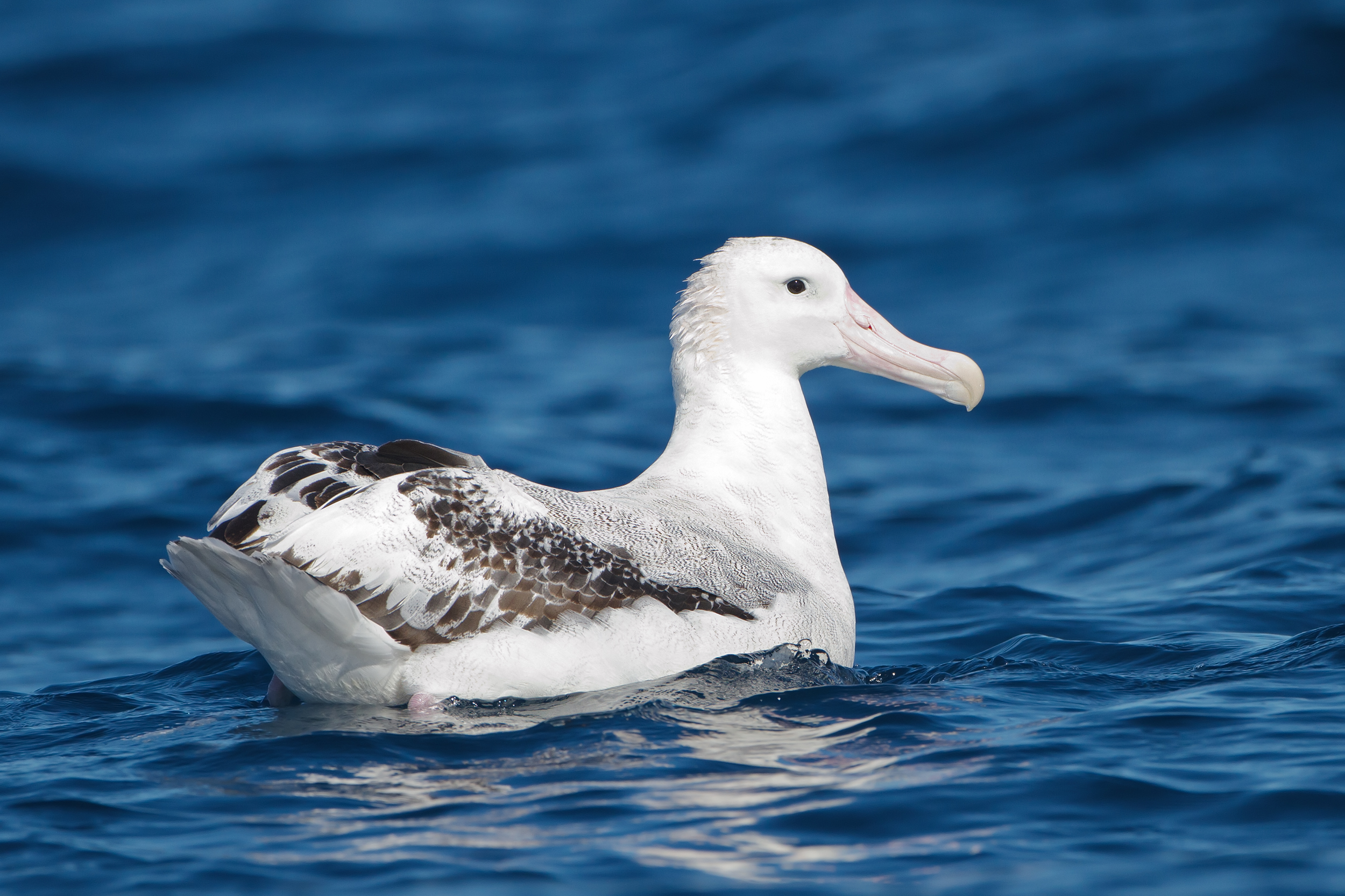
Wandering albatross (Diomedea exulans)

- Wandering albatross
- Royal albatross
- Black-browed albatross
- Shy albatross
- Grey-headed albatross
- Yellow-nosed albatross
- Sooty albatross
- Light-mantled sooty albatross

== Storm-petrels ==
- Wilson's storm-petrel
- White-faced storm-petrel
- Grey-backed storm-petrel
- Black-bellied storm-petrel

== Tropicbirds ==
- Red-tailed tropicbird

== Gannets ==
- Australasian gannet

== Darters ==
- Darter

== Cormorants ==
- Little pied cormorant
- Black-faced cormorant
- Pied cormorant
- Little black cormorant
- Great cormorant

== Pelicans ==
- Australasian pelican

== Herons and allies ==
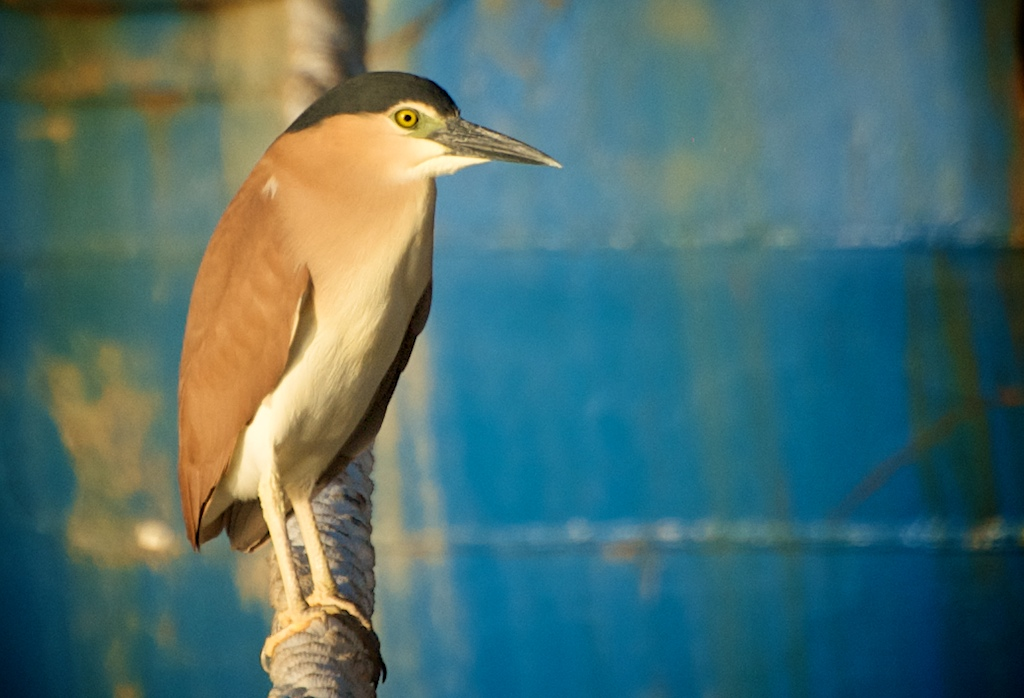
Nankeen night heron (Nycticorax caledonicus)

- White-faced heron
- Little egret
- Eastern reef egret
- White-necked heron
- Great egret
- Cattle egret
- Nankeen night heron
- Australasian bittern
- Intermediate egret

== Ibises and spoonbills ==
- Glossy ibis
- Australian white ibis
- Straw-necked ibis
- Royal spoonbill
- Yellow-billed spoonbill

== Hawks and allies ==
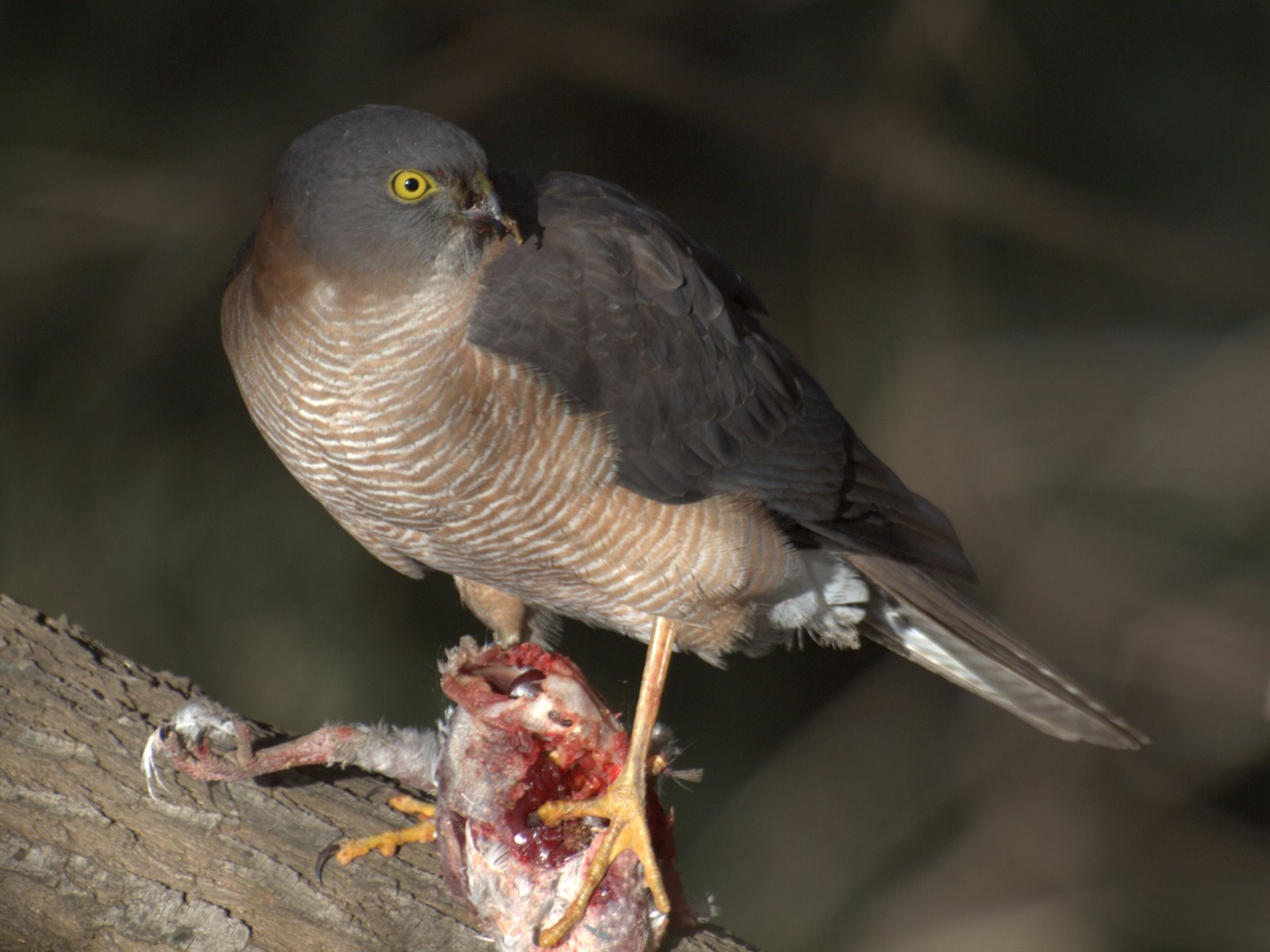
Collared sparrowhawk (Accipiter cirrocephalus)

- Black-shouldered kite
- Letter-winged kite
- Square-tailed kite
- Black kite
- Whistling kite
- White-bellied sea-eagle
- Spotted harrier
- Swamp harrier
- Brown goshawk
- Collared sparrowhawk
- Wedge-tailed eagle
- Little eagle

== Osprey ==
- Osprey

== Falcons ==
- Brown falcon
- Australian hobby
- Black falcon
- Peregrine falcon
- Nankeen kestrel

== Cranes ==
- Brolga

== Rails ==
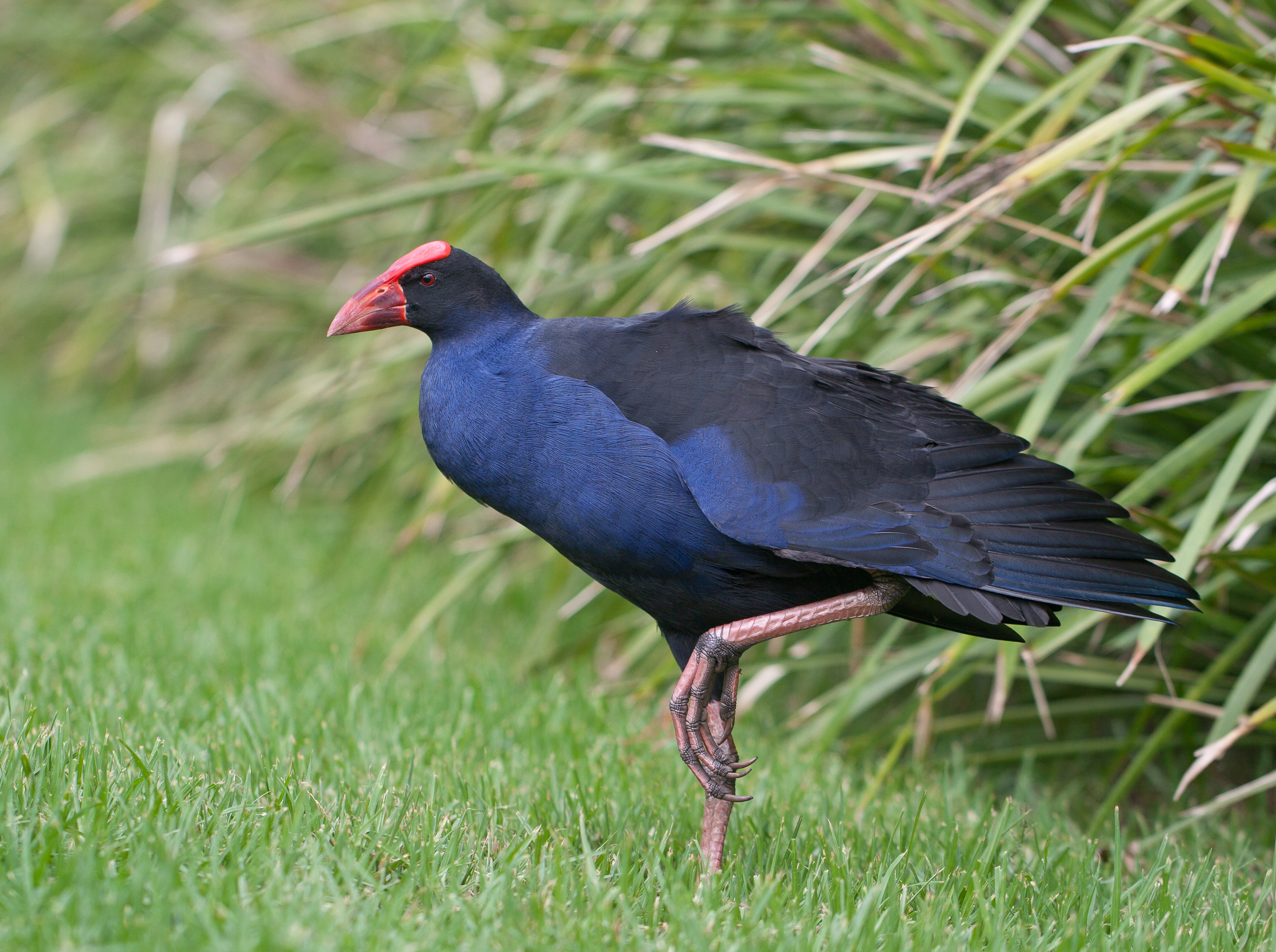
Purple swamphen (Porphyrio porphyrio)

- Buff-banded rail
- Lewin's rail
- Baillon's crake
- Australian spotted crake
- Spotless crake
- Purple swamp-hen
- Dusky moorhen
- Black-tailed native-hen
- Common coot

== Buttonquail ==
- Painted buttonquail

== Sandpipers and allies ==
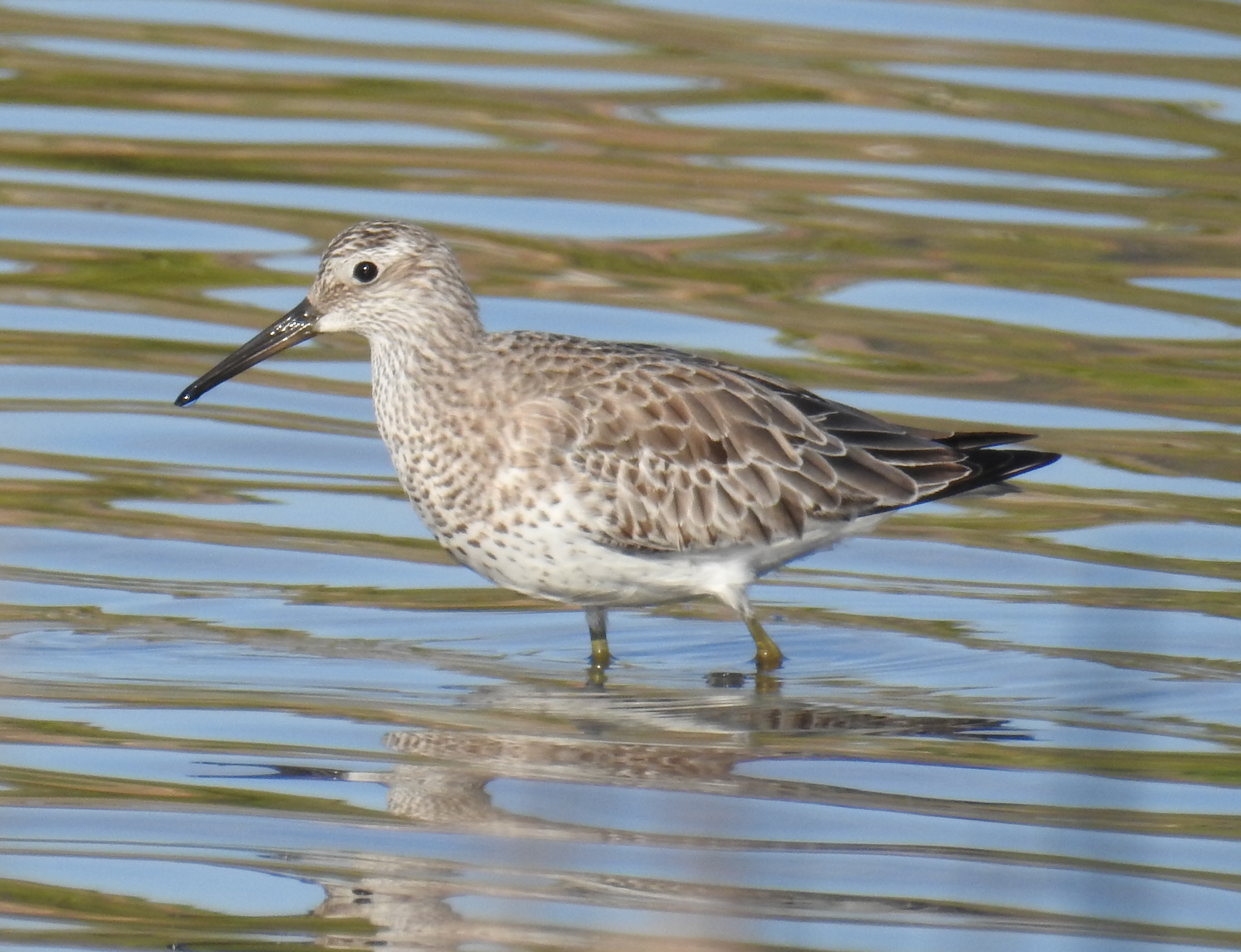
Great knot (Calidris tenuirostris)

- Latham's snipe
- Black-tailed godwit
- Bar-tailed godwit
- Eurasian whimbrel
- Eastern curlew
- Marsh sandpiper
- Common greenshank
- Wood sandpiper
- Terek sandpiper
- Common sandpiper
- Grey-tailed tattler
- Ruddy turnstone
- Red knot
- Sanderling
- Red-necked stint
- Long-toed stint
- Pectoral sandpiper
- Sharp-tailed sandpiper
- Curlew sandpiper
- Great knot

== Painted-snipe ==
- Australian painted snipe

== Stone-curlews ==
- Bush stone-curlew

== Oystercatchers ==
- Pied oystercatcher
- Sooty oystercatcher

== Avocets and stilts ==
- Black-winged stilt
- Banded stilt
- Red-necked avocet

== Plovers ==
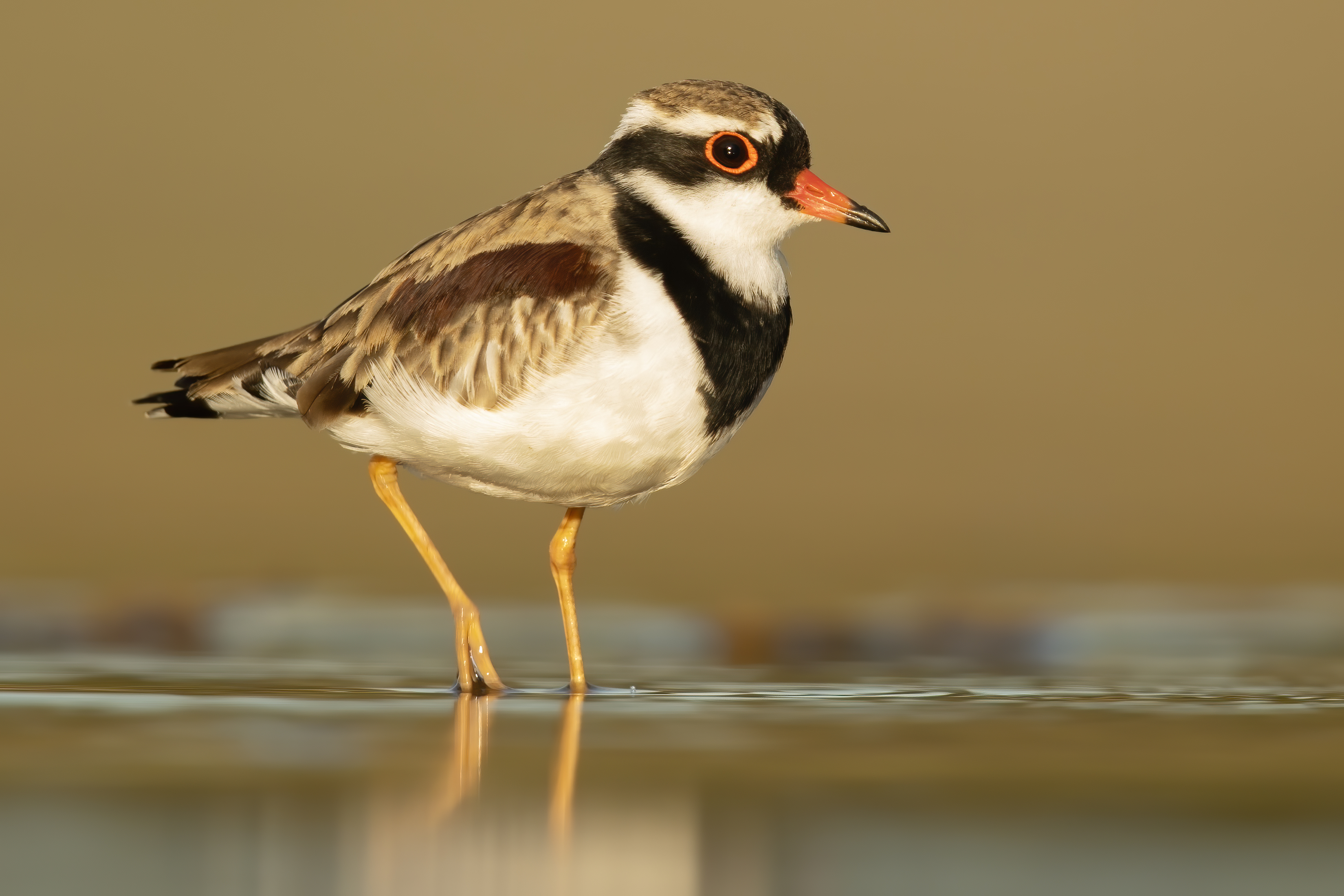
Black-fronted dotterel (Elseyornis melanops)

- Pacific golden plover
- Grey plover
- Red-capped plover
- Double-banded plover
- Lesser sand plover
- Greater sand plover
- Black-fronted dotterel
- Hooded plover
- Red-kneed dotterel
- Banded lapwing
- Masked lapwing

== Skuas ==
- Antarctic skua
- Arctic skua
- Pomarine skua
- South polar skua

== Gulls ==
- Pacific gull
- Kelp gull
- Silver gull

== Terns ==
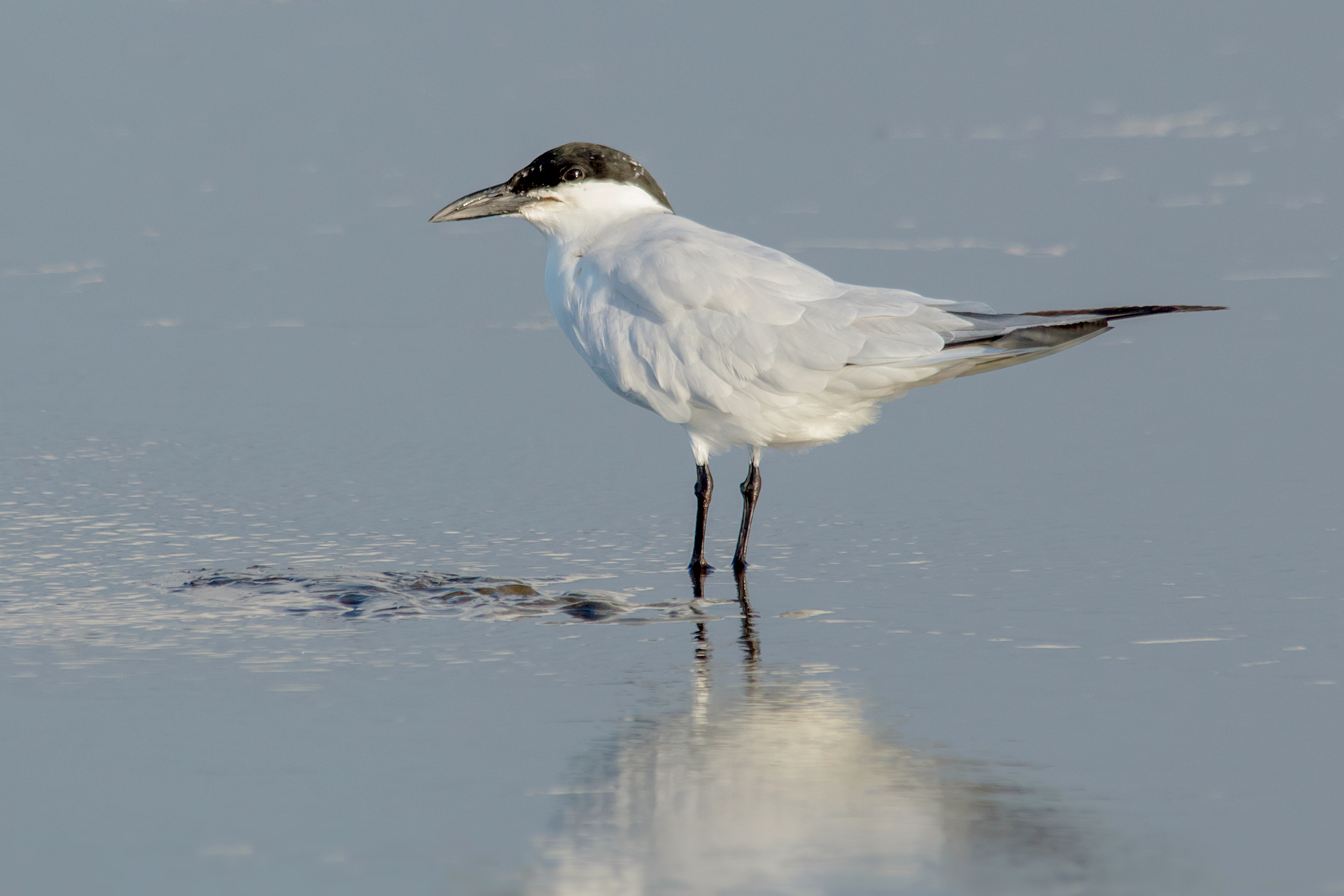
Australian Tern (Gelochelidon macrotarsa)

- Australian tern
- Caspian tern
- Crested tern
- White-fronted tern
- Common tern
- Antarctic tern
- Fairy tern
- Sooty tern
- Whiskered tern
- Arctic tern
- Little tern
- White-winged tern

== Pigeons and doves ==
- Rock dove (introduced)
- Spotted dove (introduced)
- Common bronzewing
- Brush bronzewing
- Crested pigeon (introduced)
- Peaceful dove

== Cockatoos ==
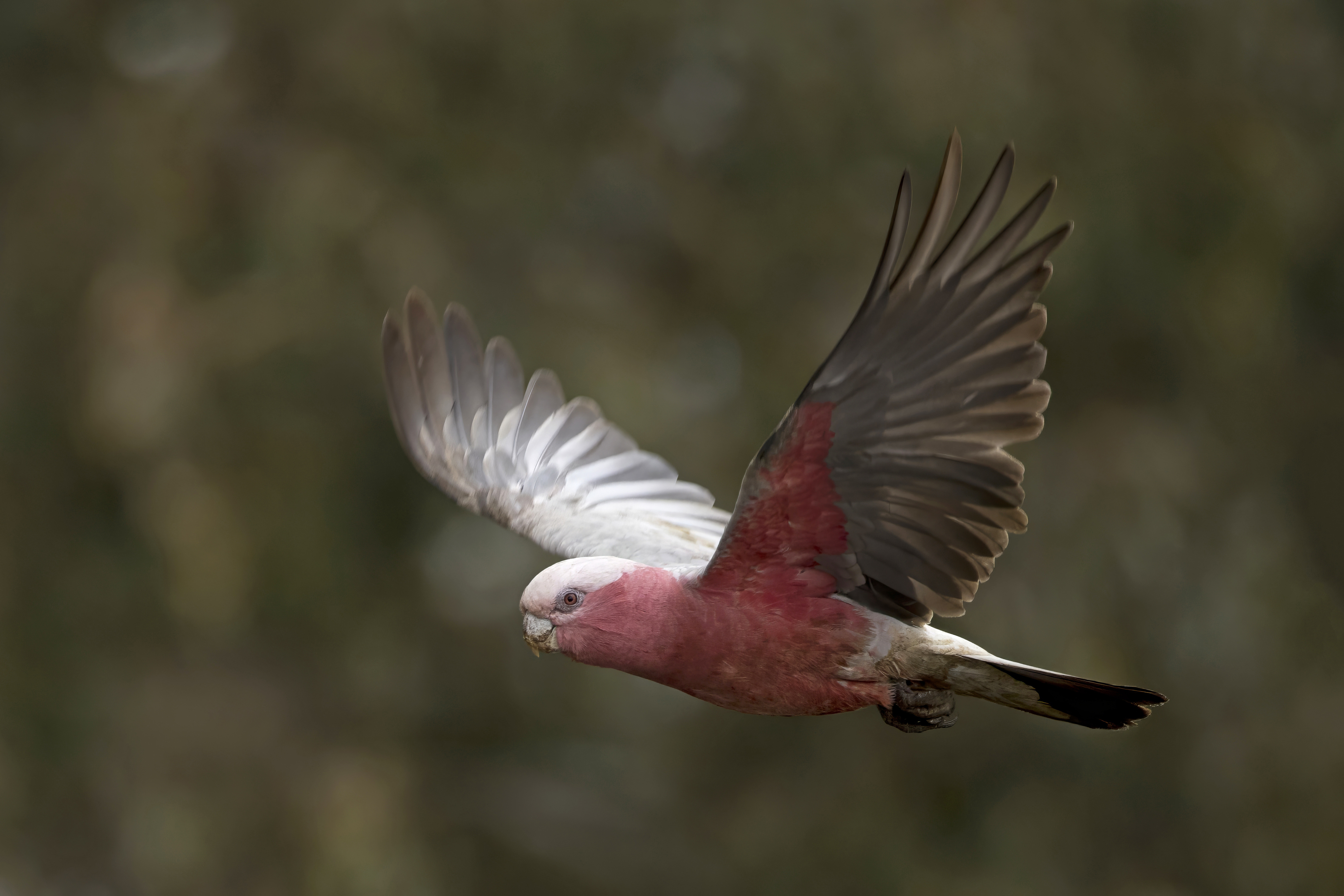
Galah (Eolophus roseicapilla)

- Glossy black cockatoo
- Yellow-tailed black cockatoo
- Gang-gang cockatoo(introduced)
- Galah
- Little corella
- Sulphur-crested cockatoo
- Cockatiel
- Long-billed corella

== Parrots ==
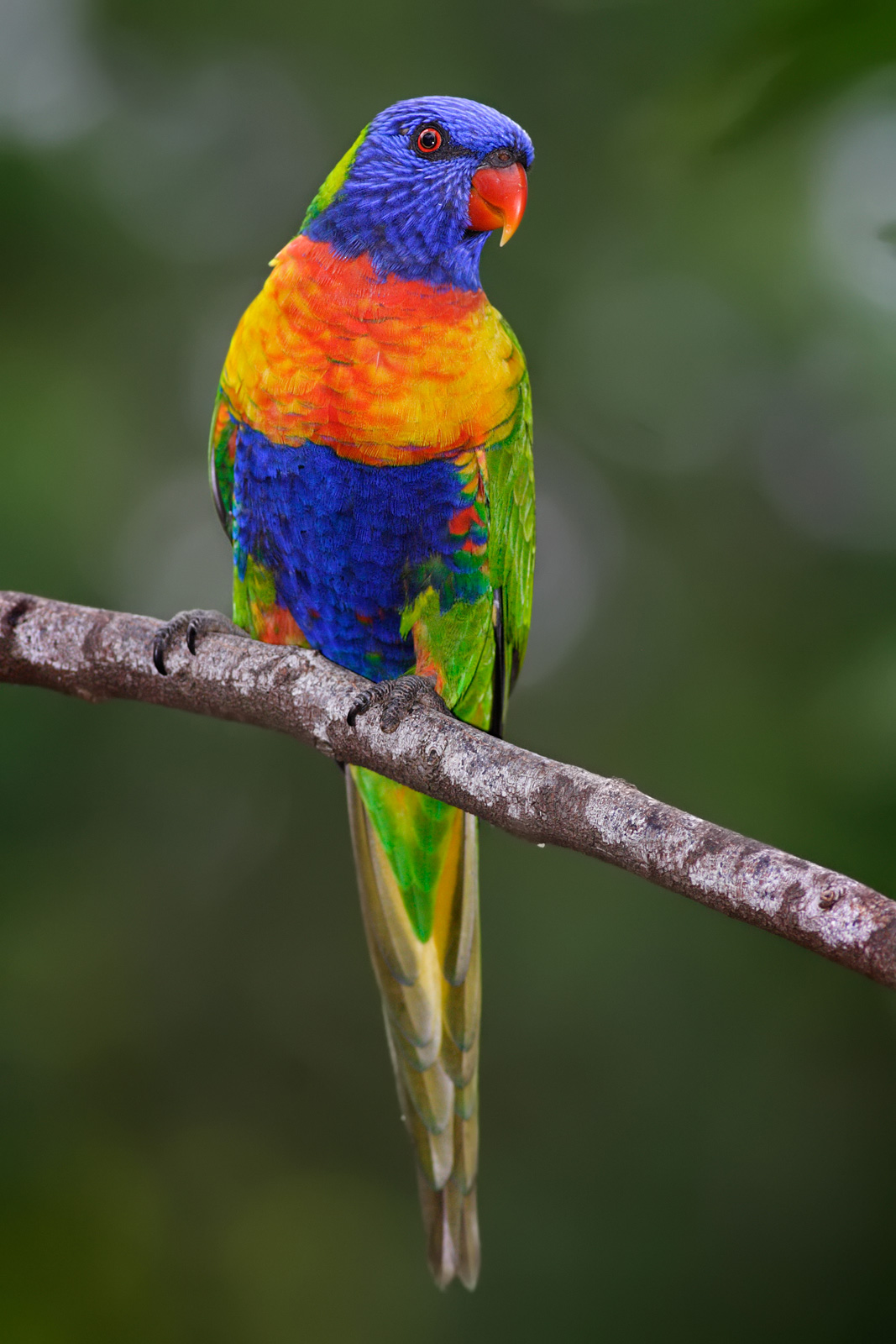
Rainbow Lorikeet (Trichoglossus moluccanus)

- Rainbow lorikeet
- Purple-crowned lorikeet
- Musk lorikeet
- Crimson rosella
- Eastern rosella
- Budgerigar
- Elegant parrot
- Rock parrot
- Red-rumped parrot
- Eastern bluebonnet
- Mulga parrot
- Blue-winged parrot

== Cuckoos ==
- Pallid cuckoo
- Fan-tailed cuckoo
- Horsfield's bronze-cuckoo
- Shining bronze-cuckoo
- Black-eared cuckoo

== Barn owls ==
- Barn owl

== Owls ==
- Australian boobook

== Frogmouths ==
- Tawny frogmouth

== Nightjars ==
- Spotted nightjar

== Owlet-nightjars ==
- Australian owlet-nightjar

== Swifts ==
- White-throated needletail
- Pacific swift

== Kingfishers ==
- Laughing kookaburra (introduced)
- Sacred kingfisher

== Bee-eaters ==
- Rainbow bee-eater

== Rollers ==
- Dollarbird

== Treecreepers ==
- White-throated treecreeper
- Brown treecreeper

== Flowerpeckers ==
- Mistletoebird

== Australo-Papuan wrens ==
- Variegated fairy-wren
- Superb fairy-wren
- Southern emu-wren

== Pardalotes ==
- Spotted pardalote
- Striated pardalote

== Thornbills and allies ==
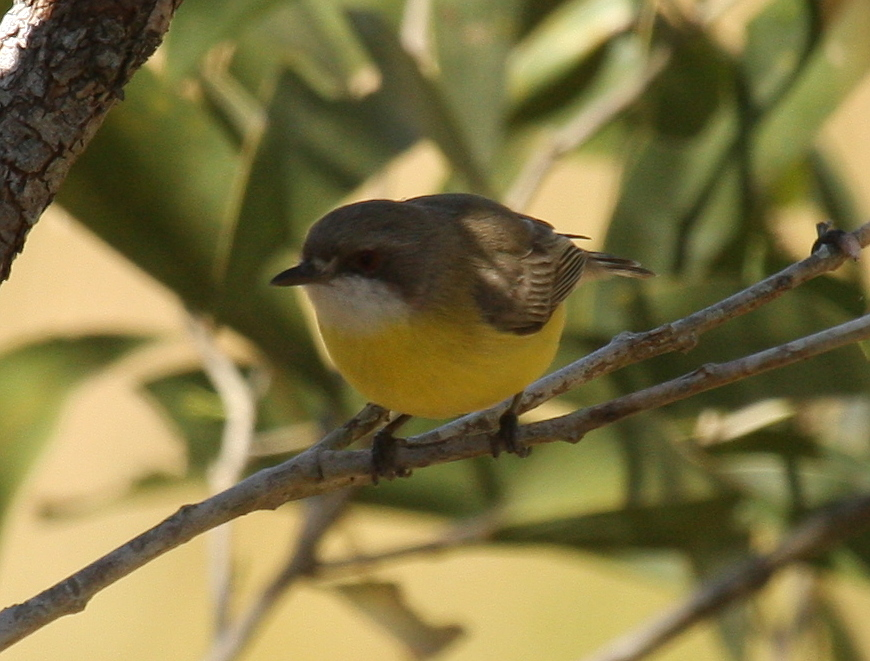
White-throated Gerygone (Gerygone olivacea)

- White-browed scrubwren
- Shy heathwren
- Brown thornbill
- Yellow thornbill
- Striated thornbill
- Yellow-rumped thornbill
- Inland thornbill
- White-throated gerygone
- Chestnut-rumped heathwren
- Southern whiteface

== Honeyeaters ==
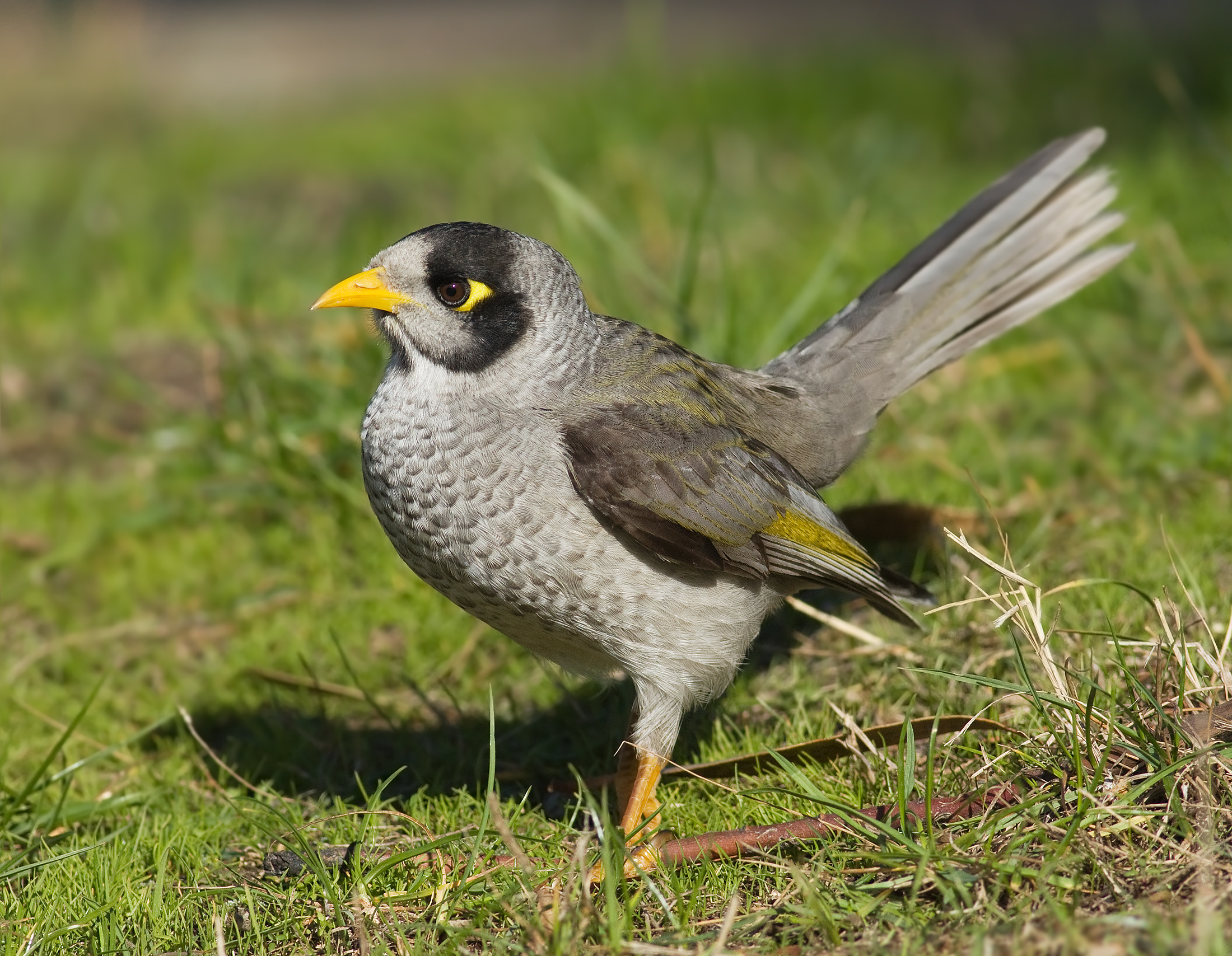
Noisy miner (Manorina melanocephala)

- Red wattlebird (Kangaroo Island sub-species)
- Little wattlebird
- Regent honeyeater
- Singing honeyeater
- White-eared honeyeater
- Purple-gaped honeyeater (Kangaroo Island sub-species)
- White-plumed honeyeater
- Brown-headed honeyeater
- White-naped honeyeater
- Crescent honeyeater (Kangaroo Island sub-species)
- New Holland honeyeater (Kangaroo Island sub-species)
- White-fronted honeyeater
- Tawny-crowned honeyeater
- Eastern spinebill
- Pied honeyeater
- Yellow-plumed honeyeater
- Yellow-faced honeyeater
- White-fronted honeyeater
- Noisy miner
- Yellow-throated miner
- Spiny-cheeked honeyeater
- Black honeyeater

== Australian chats ==
- Crimson chat
- White-fronted chat

== Australian robins ==
- Scarlet robin
- Flame robin
- Rose robin
- Jacky-winter

== Whipbirds ==
- Western whipbird (Kangaroo Island sub-species)

== Whistlers ==
- Golden whistler
- Rufous whistler
- Grey shrike-thrush

== Monarch flycatchers ==
- Satin flycatcher
- Restless flycatcher

== Mudnest-builders ==
- Magpie-lark

== Fantails ==
- Grey fantail
- Willie wagtail

== Drongos ==
- Spangled drongo (vagrant)

== Cuckooshrikes ==
- Black-faced cuckooshrike
- White-winged triller

== Sittellas ==
- Varied sittella

== Woodswallows ==
- Masked woodswallow
- White-browed woodswallow
- Black-faced woodswallow
- Dusky woodswallow

== Bellmagpies and allies ==
- Australian magpie
- Grey currawong (Kangaroo Island sub-species)
- Grey butcherbird

== Crows ==
- Australian raven
- Little raven

== Larks ==
- Singing bushlark
- Skylark

== Pipits and wagtails ==
- Australian pipit

== Old World sparrows ==
- House sparrow (introduced)

== Waxbills and allies ==
- Red-browed finch
- Beautiful firetail
- Zebra finch

== Finches ==
- Goldfinch (introduced)

== Swallows and martins ==
- Welcome swallow
- Tree martin
- Fairy martin
- White-backed swallow

== Old World warblers ==
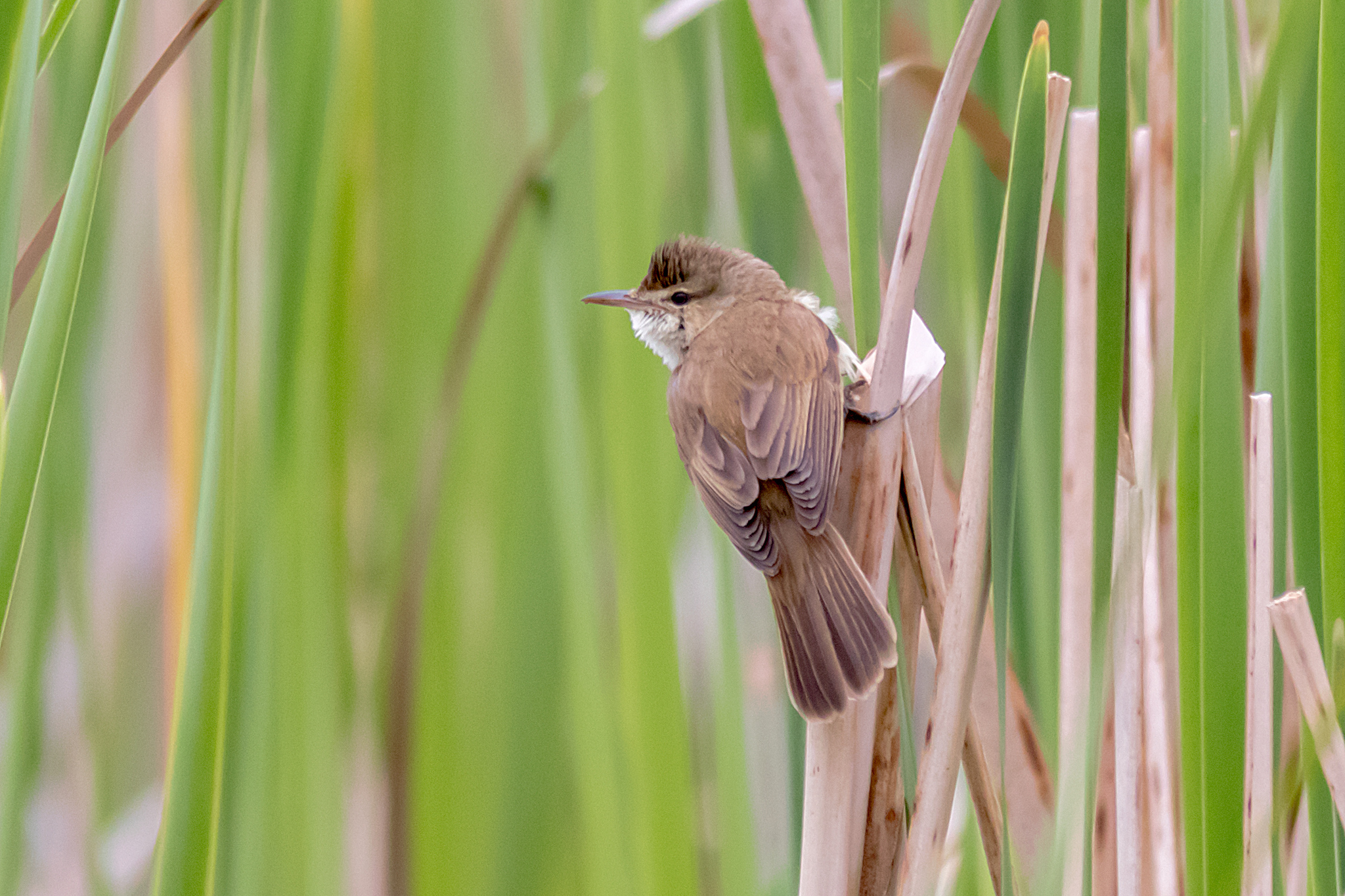
Australian Reed Warbler (Acrocephalus australis)

- Australian reed warbler
- Little grassbird
- Brown songlark
- Rufous songlark

== White-eyes ==
- Silvereye (a subspecies)

== Thrushes ==
- Bassian thrush (a subspecies)
- Common blackbird (introduced)

== Starlings ==
- European starling (introduced)

== Sources ==
- Baxter, C (1995), An annotated list of the birds of Kangaroo Island (Rev. ed.), South Australia National Parks and Wildlife Service, Department of Environment and Natural Resources, ISBN 978-0-7308-0677-6
