= Canberra Ornithologists Group =

Ornithological society in Canberra ACT

The Canberra Ornithologists Group (COG) was founded on 15 April 1970 when the ACT branch of the Royal Australasian Ornithologists Union (RAOU) became defunct following drastic reform within the RAOU in the late 1960s which abolished all its branches. It publishes a quarterly journal, Canberra Bird Notes, as well as a monthly newsletter, Gang-gang. Its aims are to:

- encourage interest in, and develop knowledge of, the birds of the Canberra region
- promote and co-ordinate the study of birds
- to promote the conservation of native birds and their habitat

COG holds monthly meetings in Canberra as well as regular field excursions. The logo of COG is the gang-gang cockatoo.
