= List of birds of Tasmania =

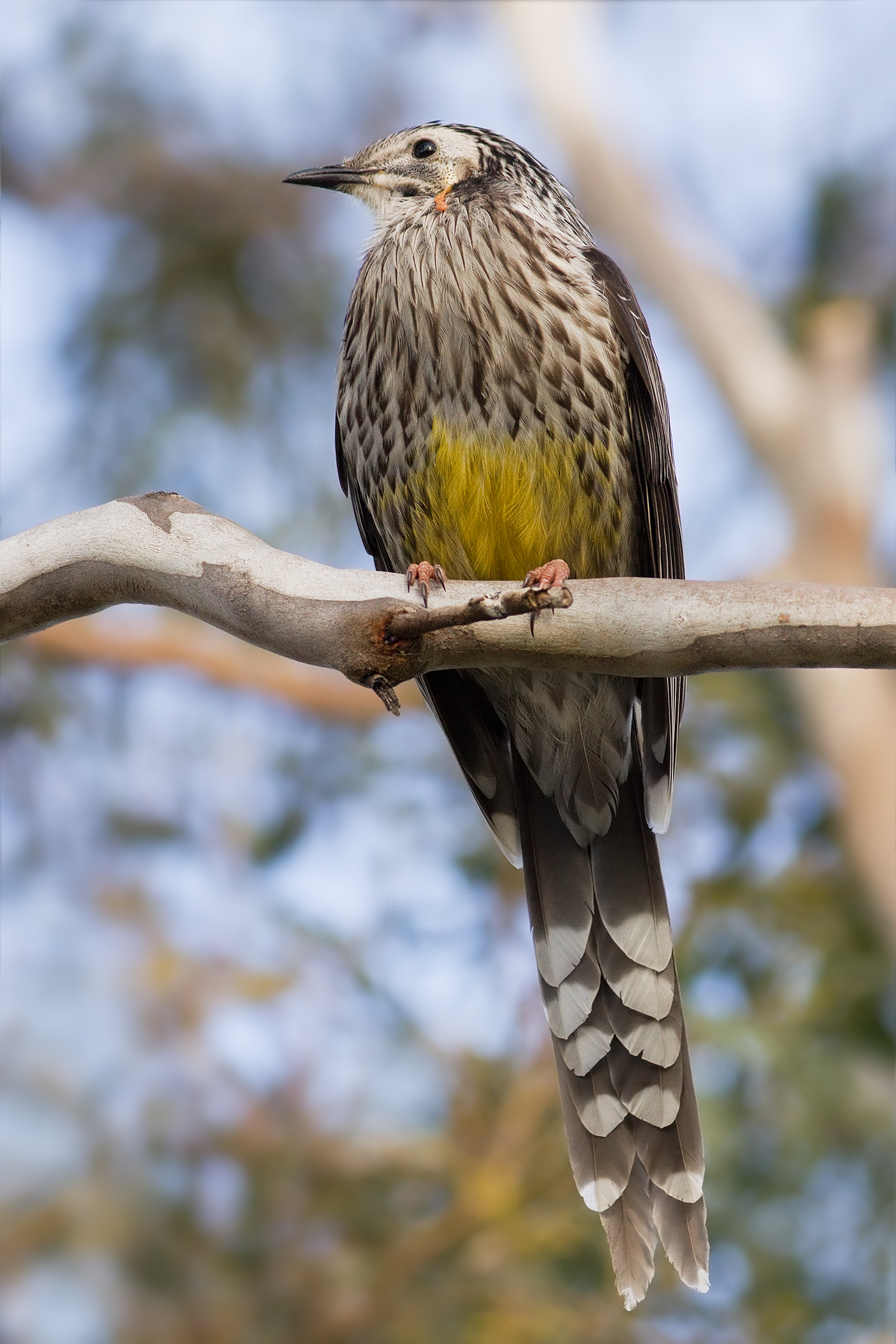
The yellow wattlebird is Australia's largest honeyeater and an endemic Tasmanian species.

A total of 383 species of bird have been recorded living in the wild on the island of Tasmania, nearby islands and islands in Bass Strait. Birds of Macquarie Island are not included in this list. Twelve species are endemic to the island of Tasmania, and most of these are common and widespread. However, the forty-spotted pardalote is rare and restricted, while the island's two breeding endemic species, the world's only migratory parrots, are both threatened. 22 species are introduced, and 30 species are globally threatened.

Several species of penguin are late summer visitors to Tasmanian shores. Tasmania's endemic birds have led to it being classified as an Endemic Bird Area (EBA), one of 218 such areas worldwide. Priority regions for habitat-based conservation of birds around the world, they are defined by containing two or more restricted-range (endemic) species.

Although Tasmania has been isolated from the Australian mainland for about 10,000 years, islands in the Bass Strait between the two landmasses have allowed many species to traverse. With around 5,400 km (3,400 mi) of coastline and 350 offshore islands, Tasmania provides a diverse haven for birds despite its relatively small size. Birds are abundant in Tasmanian wetlands and waterways, and ten of these habitats are internationally important and protected under the Ramsar Convention. Many migratory birds make use of the bays, mudflats and beaches for feeding, including the threatened hooded plover and little tern, both of which breed along the coast. The near-coastal button grass grasslands of the southwest, harbour the breeding grounds of the critically endangered orange-bellied parrot. Many of the rarer species dwell in Tasmania's eucalyptus (sclerophyll) forest or rainforest, which cover much of the island.

The common and scientific names and taxonomic arrangement follow the conventions laid out in the 2008 publication Systematics and Taxonomy of Australian Birds. Supplemental updates follow The Clements Checklist of Birds of the World, 2022 edition.

This list uses British English throughout. Any bird names or other wording follows that convention. Unless otherwise noted, all species listed below are considered to occur, or have occurred since European settlement in the case of extinct species, regularly in Tasmania as permanent residents, summer or winter visitors, or migrants. The following codes denote certain categories of species:

- (I) – Introduced: Birds that have been introduced to Tasmania by humans
- (Ex) – Extinct
- (V) – Uncommon vagrants to Tasmania
- (E) – Endemic to Tasmania

== Cassowaries and emu ==
Order: Casuariiformes Family: Dromaiidae

The Dromaiidae were represented in Tasmanian territory by two species, both now extirpated. The King Island emu became extinct around 1802, and the original populations of emus on Tasmania had vanished by 1865. Whether or not the Tasmanian emu was a separate subspecies is unclear.

- Emu, Dromaius novaehollandiae (extirpated)
  - Tasmanian emu, D. h. diemenensis (Ex) (E)
  - King Island emu, D. h. minor (Ex) (E)

== Magpie goose ==
Order: Anseriformes Family: Anseranatidae

The family contains a single species, the magpie goose. It was an early and distinctive offshoot of the anseriform family tree, diverging after screamers and before all other ducks, geese and swans, sometime in the late Cretaceous. The single species is a vagrant to Tasmania.

- Magpie goose, Anseranus semipalmata (V)

== Ducks, geese, and waterfowl ==
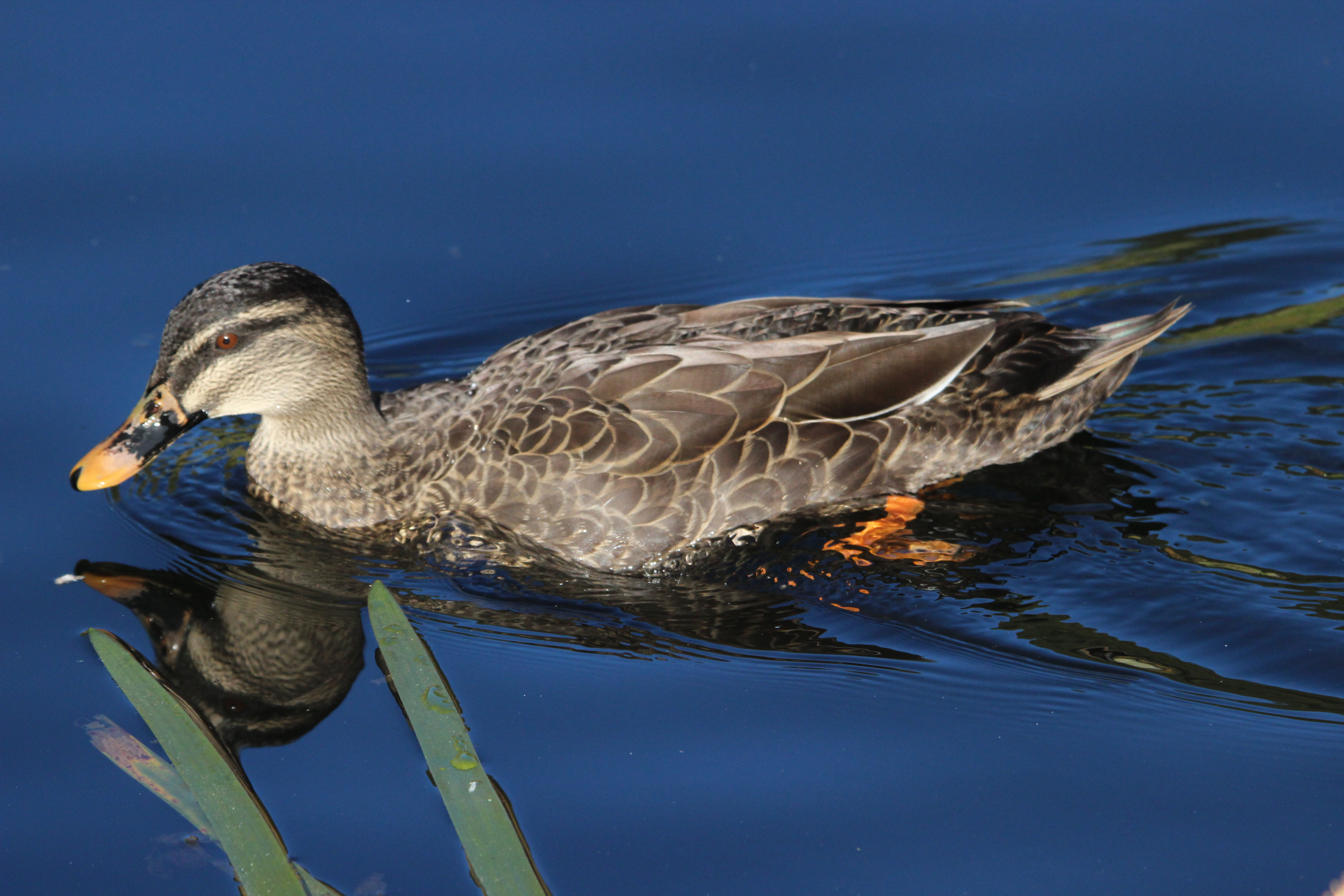
Mallard × Pacific black duck hybrid, Richmond, Tasmania

Order: Anseriformes Family: Anatidae

The family Anatidae includes the ducks and most duck-like waterfowl, such as geese and swans. These are adapted for an aquatic existence, with webbed feet, bills that are flattened to a greater or lesser extent, and feathers that are excellent at shedding water due to special oils.

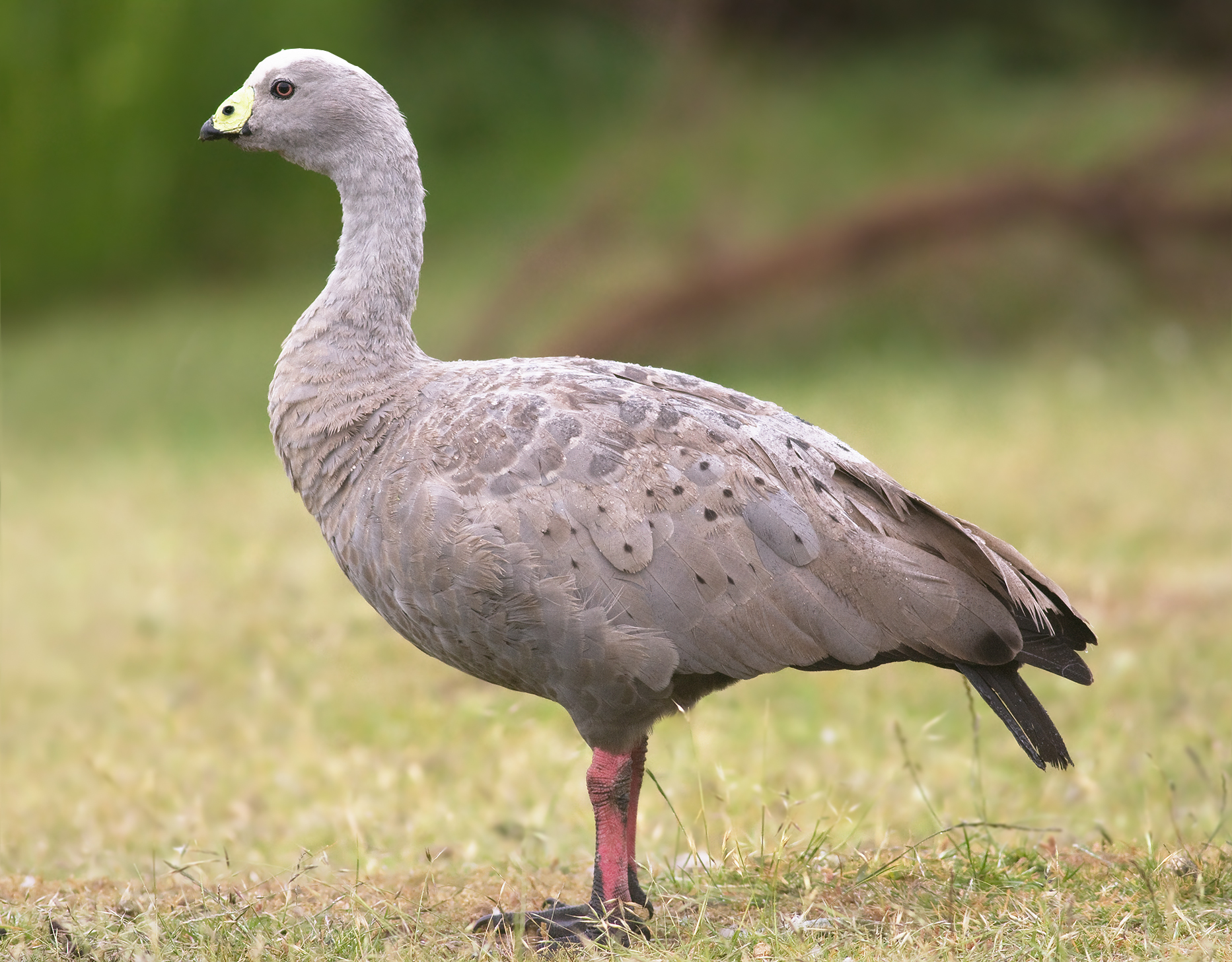
Cape Barren goose

- Plumed whistling-duck, Dendrocygna eytoni (V)
- Wandering whistling-duck, Dendrocygna arcuata (V)
- Cape Barren goose, Cereopsis novaehollandiae
- Freckled duck, Stictonetta naevosa
- Mute swan, Cygnus olor (I)
- Black swan, Cygnus atratus
- Australian shelduck, Tadorna tadornoides
- Australian wood duck, Chenonetta jubata
- Australasian shoveler, Spatula rhynchotis
- Pacific black duck, Anas superciliosa
- Mallard, Anas platyrhynchos (I)
- Grey teal, Anas gracilis
- Chestnut teal, Anas castanea
- Pink-eared duck, Malacorhynchus membranaceus (V)
- Hardhead, Aythya australis
- Blue-billed duck, Oxyura australis
- Musk duck, Biziura lobata

== New World quail ==
Order: Galliformes Family: Odontophoridae

The New World quails are small, plump terrestrial birds only distantly related to the quails of the Old World, but named for their similar appearance and habits. One species has become naturalised in Tasmania.

- California quail, Callipepla californica (I)

== Pheasants, grouse, and allies ==
Order: Galliformes Family: Phasianidae

Phasianidae consists of the pheasants and their allies. These are terrestrial species, variable in size but generally plump, with broad, relatively short wings. Many species are gamebirds or have been domesticated as a food source for humans. Two species are native to Tasmania.

- Indian peafowl, Pavo cristatus (I) (Note: HANZAB 2, p. 373.)
- Brown quail, Coturnix ypsilophora
- Stubble quail, Coturnix pectoralis
- Red junglefowl, Gallus gallus (I)
- Ring-necked pheasant, Phasianus colchicus (I) (Note: HANZAB 2, p. 377.)
- Wild turkey, Meleagris gallopavo (I) (Note: HANZAB 2, p. 355.)

== Grebes ==
Order: Podicipediformes Family: Podicipedidae

Grebes are small to medium-large freshwater diving birds. They have lobed toes and are excellent swimmers and divers. However, they have their feet placed far back on the body, making them quite ungainly on land. Three species have been recorded in Tasmania.

- Australasian grebe, Tachybaptus novaehollandiae
- Hoary-headed grebe, Poliocephalus poliocephalus
- Great crested grebe, Podiceps cristatus

== Pigeons and doves ==
Order: Columbiformes Family: Columbidae

Pigeons and doves are stout-bodied birds with short necks and short slender bills with a fleshy cere. Eight species have been recorded in Tasmania, two of which have been introduced and another three are vagrants.

- Rock pigeon, Columba livia (I)
- White-headed pigeon, Columba leucomela (V)
- Spotted dove, Spilopelia chinensis (I)
- Common bronzewing, Phaps chalcoptera
- Brush bronzewing, Phaps elegans
- Superb fruit-dove, Ptilinopus superbus (V)
- Rose-crowned fruit-dove, Ptilinopus regina (V)
- Topknot pigeon, Lopholaimus antarcticus (V)

== Cuckoos ==
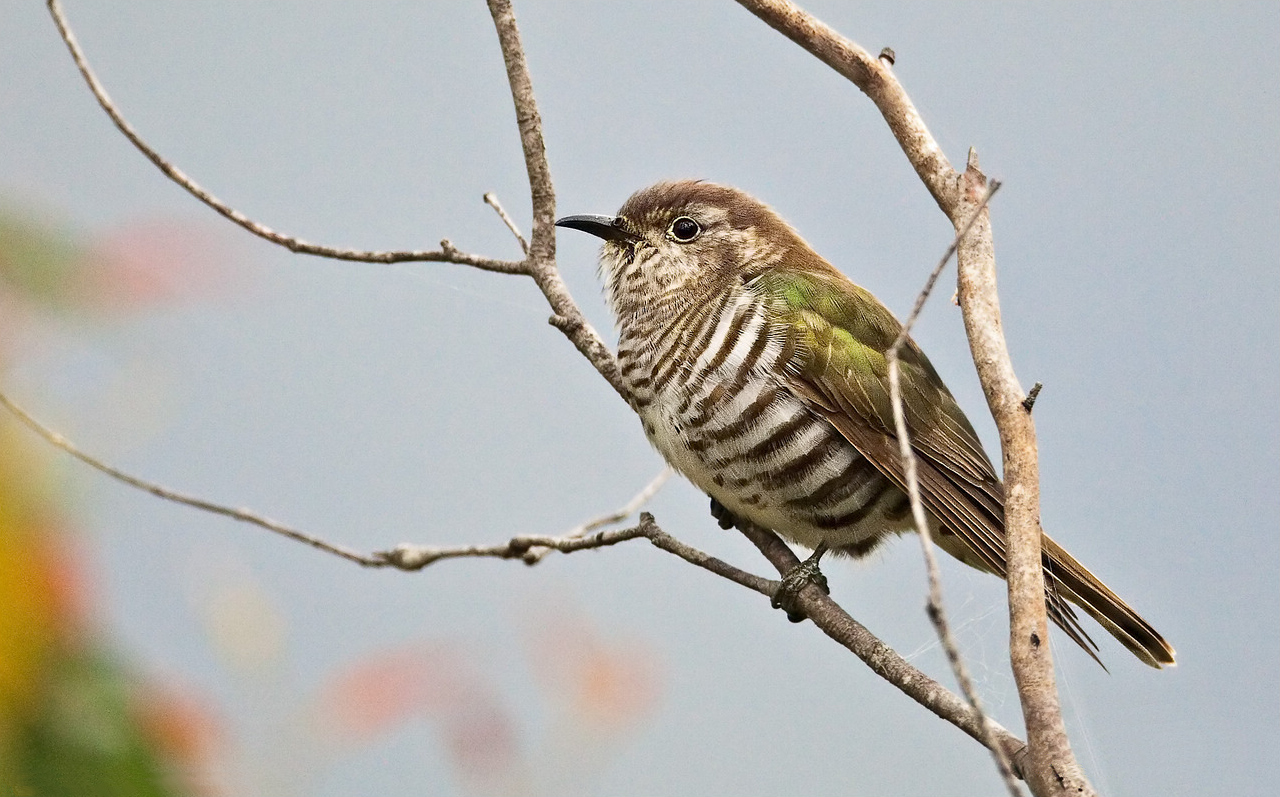
Shining bronze cuckoo

Order: Cuculiformes Family: Cuculidae

The family Cuculidae includes cuckoos, roadrunners and anis. These birds are of variable size with slender bodies, long tails and strong legs.

- Channel-billed cuckoo, Scythrops novaehollandiae (V)
- Horsfield's bronze-cuckoo, Chrysococcyx basalis
- Black-eared cuckoo, Chrysococcyx osculans (V)
- Shining bronze-cuckoo, Chrysococcyx lucidus
- Little bronze-cuckoo, Chrysococcyx minutillus
- Pallid cuckoo, Cacomantis pallidus
- Fan-tailed cuckoo, Cacomantis flabelliformis
- Brush cuckoo, Cacomantis variolosus

== Frogmouths ==
Order: Caprimulgiformes Family: Podargidae

The frogmouths are a distinctive group of small nocturnal birds related to swifts found from India across southern Asia to Australia. One species is found in Tasmania.

- Tawny frogmouth, Podargus strigoides

== Owlet-nightjars ==
Order: Caprimulgiformes Family: Aegothelidae

The owlet-nightjars are a distinctive group of small nocturnal birds related to swifts found from the Maluku Islands and New Guinea to Australia and New Caledonia.

- Australian owlet-nightjar, Aegotheles cristatus (Note: Subspecies is endemic to Tasmania)

== Swifts ==
Order: Caprimulgiformes Family: Apodidae

Swifts are small birds which spend the majority of their lives flying. These birds have very short legs and never settle voluntarily on the ground, perching instead only on vertical surfaces. Many swifts have long swept-back wings which resemble a crescent or boomerang.

- White-throated needletail, Hirundapus caudacutus
- Pacific swift, Apus pacificus

== Rails, gallinules, and coots ==
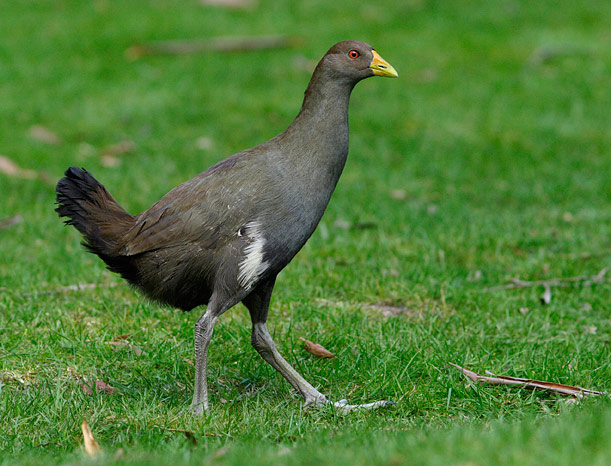
Tasmanian nativehen

Order: Gruiformes Family: Rallidae

Rallidae is a large family of small- to medium-sized birds that includes the rails, crakes, coots and gallinules. The most typical family members occupy dense vegetation in damp environments near lakes, swamps or rivers. In general they are shy and secretive birds, making them difficult to observe. Most species have strong legs and long toes that are well adapted to soft uneven surfaces. They tend to have short, rounded wings and to be weak fliers.

- Lewin's rail, Lewinia pectoralis
- Buff-banded rail, Gallirallus philippensis (V)
- Black-tailed nativehen, Tribonyx ventralis (V)
- Tasmanian nativehen, Tribonyx mortierii (E)
- Australian crake, Porzana fluminea
- Dusky moorhen, Gallinula tenebrosa
- Eurasian coot, Fulica atra
- Australasian swamphen, Porphyrio melanotus
- Baillon's crake, Zapornia pusilla
- Spotless crake, Zapornia tabuensis

== Thick-knees ==
Order: Charadriiformes Family: Burhinidae

The thick-knees are a group of species of largely tropical and nocturnal birds. They are characterised by their strong black or yellow-black bills, large yellow eyes and cryptic plumage. One species is a vagrant to Tasmania.

- Bush thick-knee, Burhinus grallarius (V)

== Stilts and avocets ==
Order: Charadriiformes Family: Recurvirostridae

Recurvirostridae is a family of large wading birds that includes the avocets and stilts. The avocets have long legs and long up-curved bills. The stilts have extremely long legs and long, thin, straight bills. All three mainland species have been recorded in Tasmania.

- Pied stilt, Himantopus leucocephalus (V)
- Banded stilt, Cladorhynchus leucocephalus (V)
- Red-necked avocet, Recurvirostra novaehollandiae (V)

== Oystercatchers ==
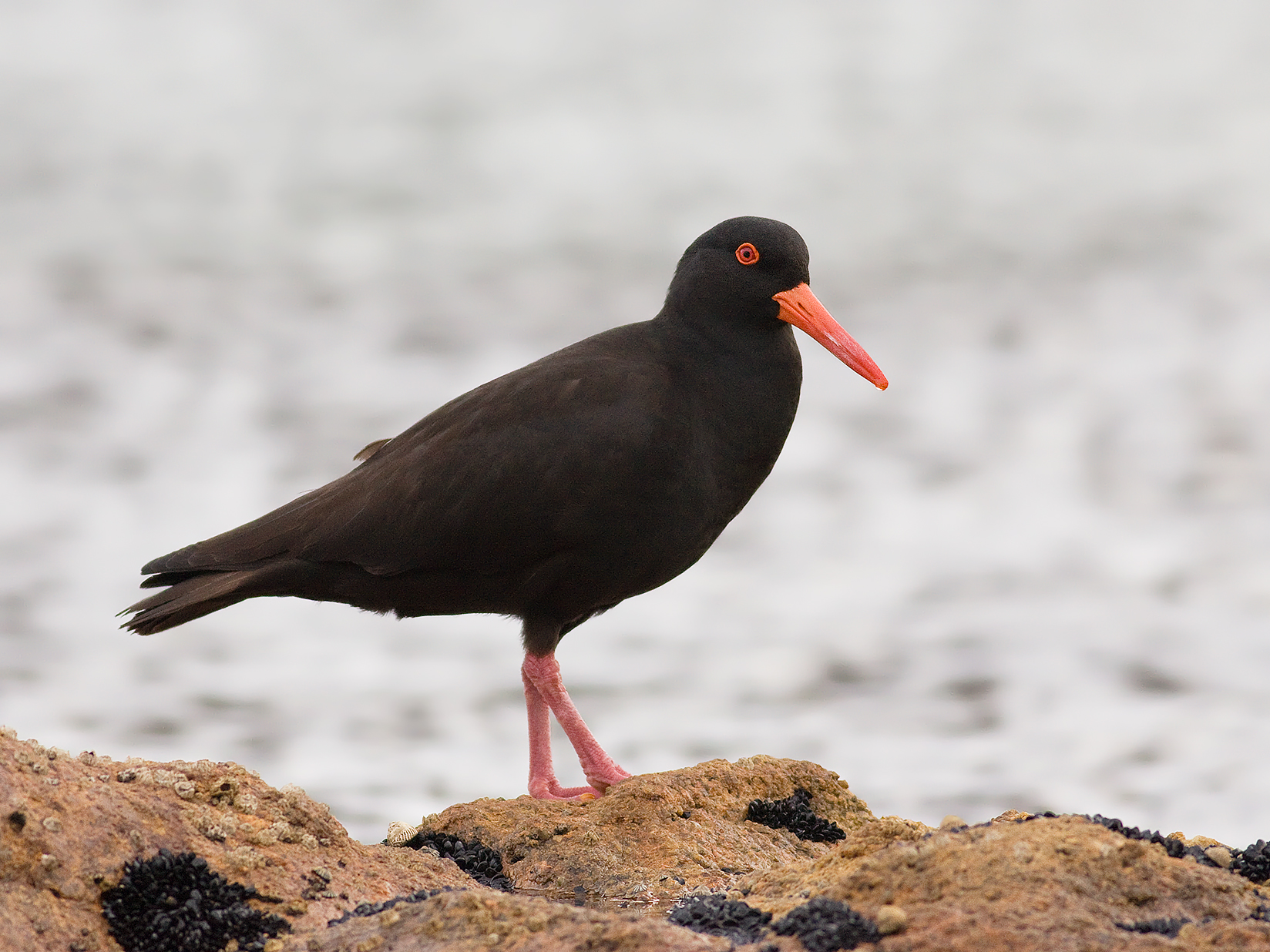
Sooty oystercatcher on Coles Bay, Tasmania

Order: Charadriiformes Family: Haematopodidae

The oystercatchers are large and noisy plover-like birds, with strong bills used for smashing or prying open molluscs. Two species have been recorded from Tasmania.

- Pied oystercatcher, Haematopus longirostris
- Sooty oystercatcher, Haematopus fuliginosus

== Lapwings and plovers ==
Order: Charadriiformes Family: Charadriidae

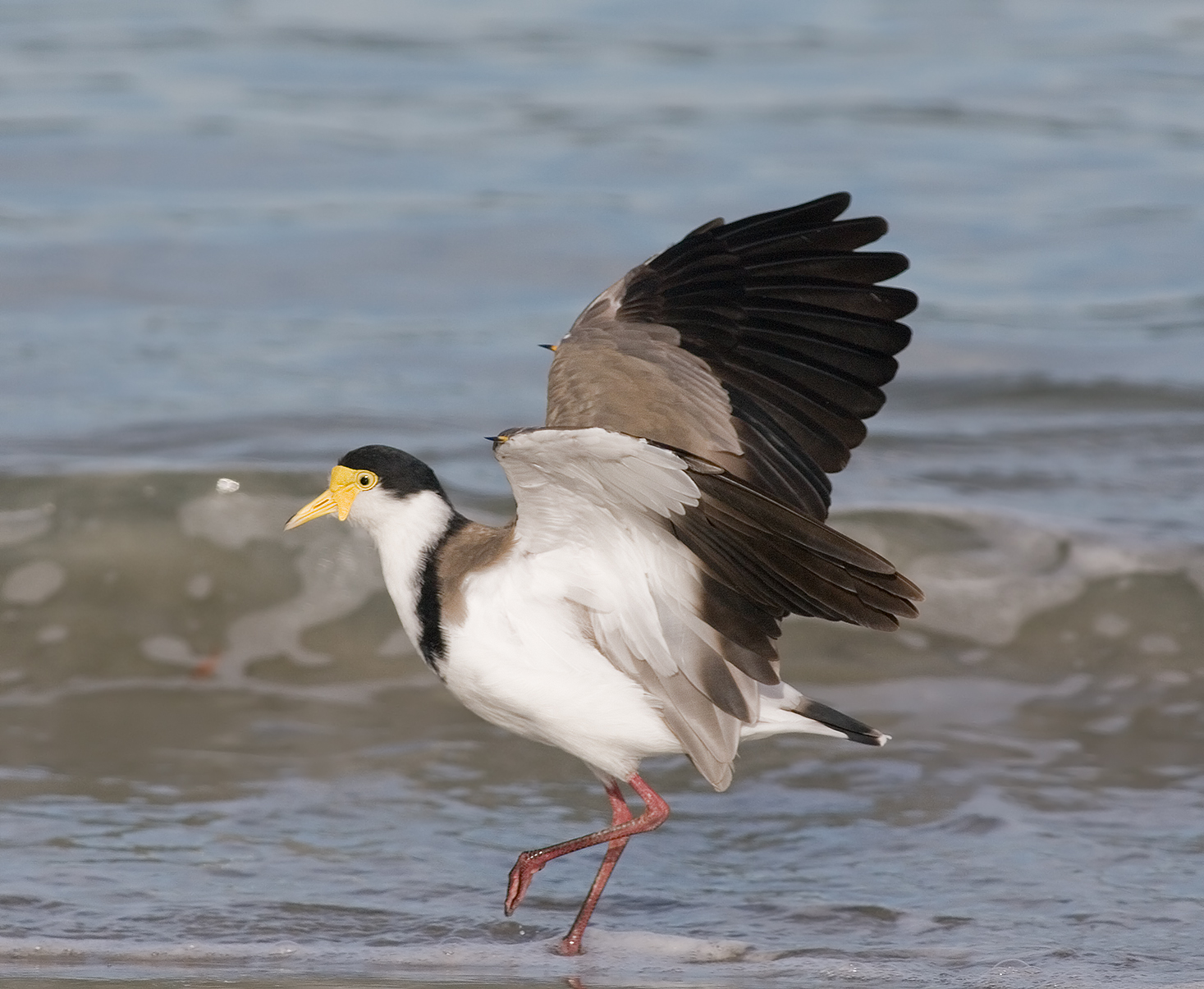
Masked lapwing on beach, Bruny Island

The family Charadriidae includes the plovers, dotterels and lapwings. They are small- to medium-sized birds with compact bodies, short, thick necks and long, usually pointed, wings. They are often found in open country worldwide, mostly in habitats near water. In Tasmania, ten species have been recorded, three of which are vagrants.

- Black-bellied plover, Pluvialis squatarola
- Pacific golden-plover, Pluvialis fulva
- Banded lapwing, Vanellus tricolor
- Masked lapwing, Vanellus miles
  - Black-shouldered lapwing, V. m. novaehollandiae
- Lesser sand-plover, Charadrius mongolus
- Greater sand-plover, Charadrius leschenaultii (V)
- Double-banded plover, Charadrius bicinctus
- Red-capped plover, Charadrius ruficapillus
- Little ringed plover, Charadrius dubius (V)
- Oriental plover, Charadrius veredus (V)
- Red-kneed dotterel, Erythrogonys cinctus (V)
- Hooded plover, Thinornis cucullatus
- Black-fronted dotterel, Elseyornis melanops

== Painted-snipe ==
Order: Charadriiformes Family: Rostratulidae

The painted-snipes are a family of three snipe-like birds found in South America, Asia and Australia. The Australian species has been split from the Asian greater painted-snipe and is a vagrant to Tasmania.

- Australian painted-snipe, Rostratula australis (V)

== Sandpipers and allies ==
Order: Charadriiformes Family: Scolopacidae

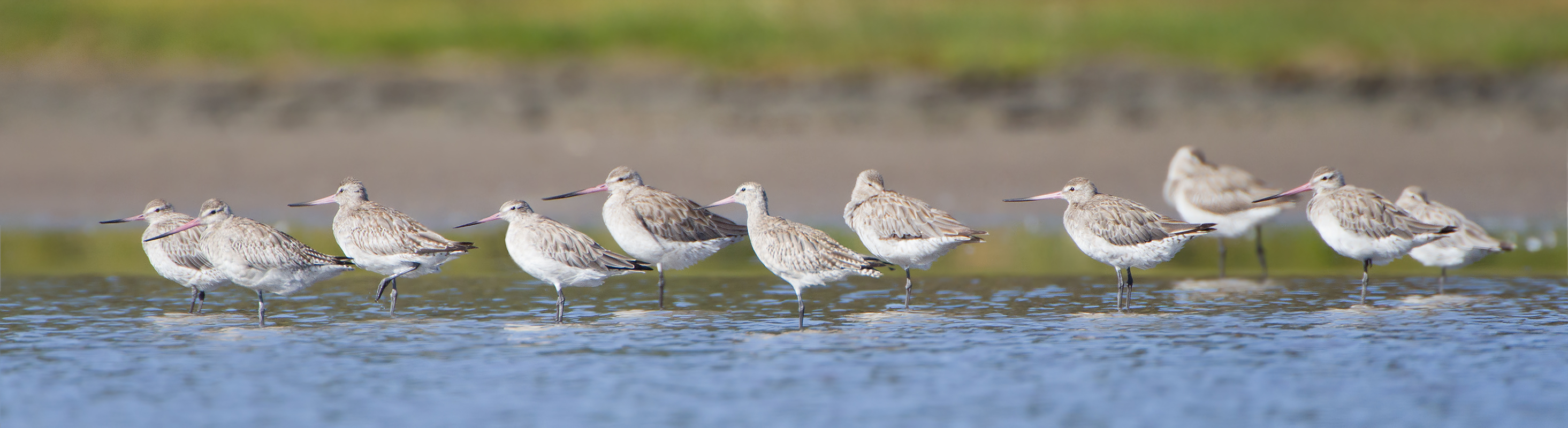
Part of a flock of bar-tailed godwit, Orielton Lagoon

Scolopacidae is a large and diverse family of small- to medium-sized shorebirds, including the sandpipers, curlews, godwits, shanks, tattlers, woodcocks, snipes, dowitchers and phalaropes. The majority of these species eat small invertebrates picked out of the mud or soil. Different lengths of legs and bills enable multiple species to feed in the same habitat, particularly on the coast, without direct competition for food.

- Whimbrel, Numenius phaeopus
- Little curlew, Numenius minutus (V)
- Far Eastern curlew, Numenius madagascariensis
- Bar-tailed godwit, Limosa lapponica
- Black-tailed godwit, Limosa limosa
- Hudsonian godwit, Limosa haemastica (V)
- Ruddy turnstone, Arenaria interpres
- Great knot, Calidris tenuirostris
- Red knot, Calidris canutus
- Ruff, Calidris pugnax (V)
- Broad-billed sandpiper, Calidris falcinellus
- Sharp-tailed sandpiper, Calidris acuminata
- Curlew sandpiper, Calidris ferruginea
- Long-toed stint, Calidris subminuta (V)

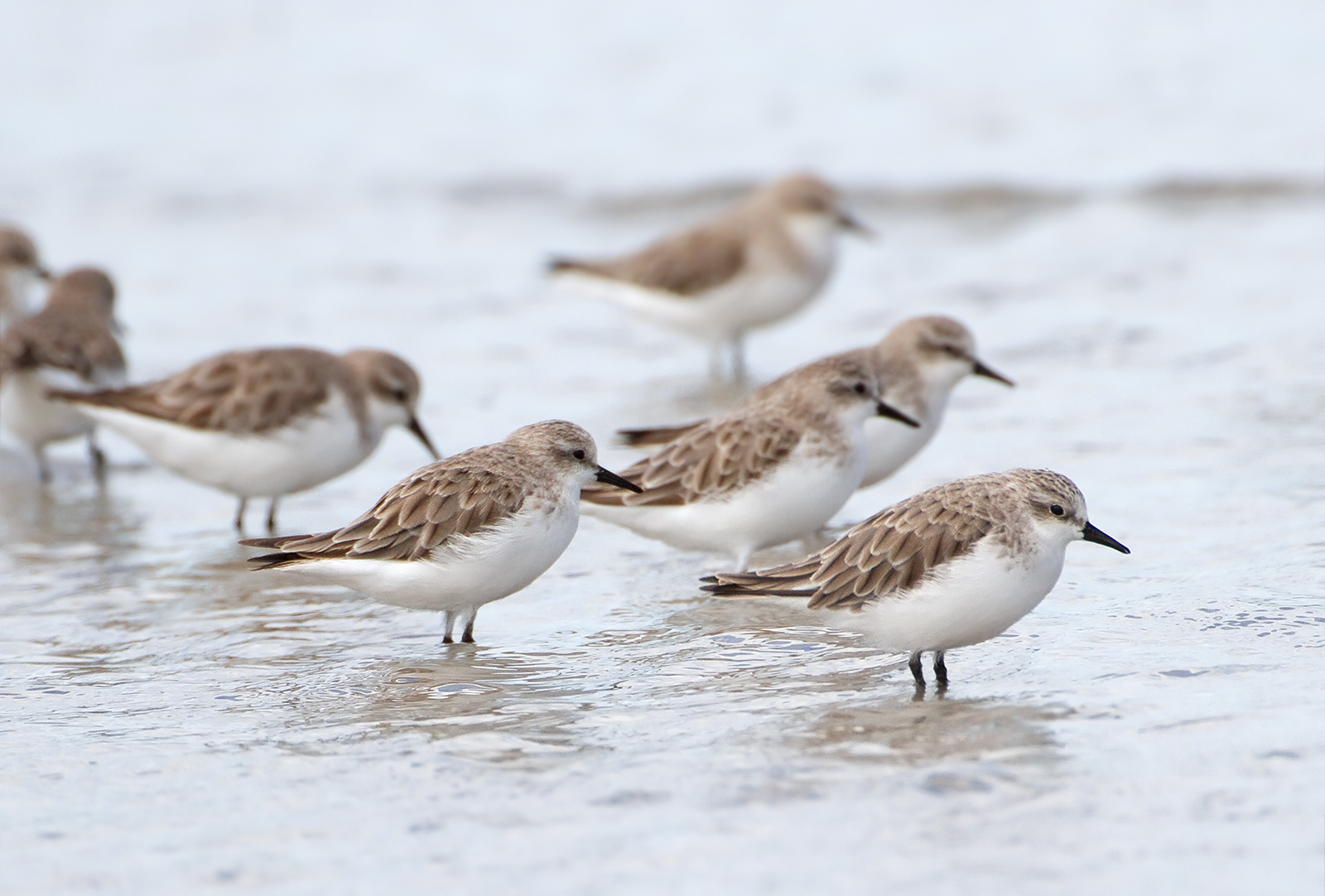
Red-necked stint at Orford, winter plumage

- Red-necked stint, Calidris ruficollis
- Sanderling, Calidris alba
- Baird's sandpiper, Calidris bairdii (V)
- Little stint, Calidris minuta (V)
- Buff-breasted sandpiper, Calidris subruficollis (V)
- Pectoral sandpiper, Calidris melanotos (V)
- Latham's snipe, Gallinago hardwickii
- Terek sandpiper, Xenus cinereus
- Red-necked phalarope, Phalaropus lobatus (V)
- Common sandpiper, Actitis hypoleucos
- Grey-tailed tattler, Tringa brevipes
- Common greenshank, Tringa nebularia
- Marsh sandpiper, Tringa stagnatilis
- Wood sandpiper, Tringa glareola (V)

== Buttonquail ==
Order: Charadriiformes Family: Turnicidae

The buttonquail are an ancient lineage of shorebirds which closely resemble true quail in appearance but are unrelated. They are found in Africa, Asia and Australia, with one species reaching Tasmania.

- Painted buttonquail, Turnix varius
- Little buttonquail, Turnix velox (V)

== Skuas and jaegers ==
Order: Charadriiformes Family: Stercorariidae

The skuas are in general medium to large birds, typically with grey or brown plumage, often with white markings on the wings. They have longish bills with hooked tips and webbed feet with sharp claws. They look like large dark gulls, but have a fleshy cere above the upper mandible. They are strong, acrobatic fliers.

- South polar skua, Stercorarius maccormicki (V)
- Brown skua, Stercorarius antarcticus
- Pomarine jaeger, Stercorarius pomarinus
- Parasitic jaeger, Stercorarius parasiticus
- Long-tailed jaeger, Stercorarius longicauda (V)

== Gulls, terns, and skimmers ==
Order: Charadriiformes Family: Laridae

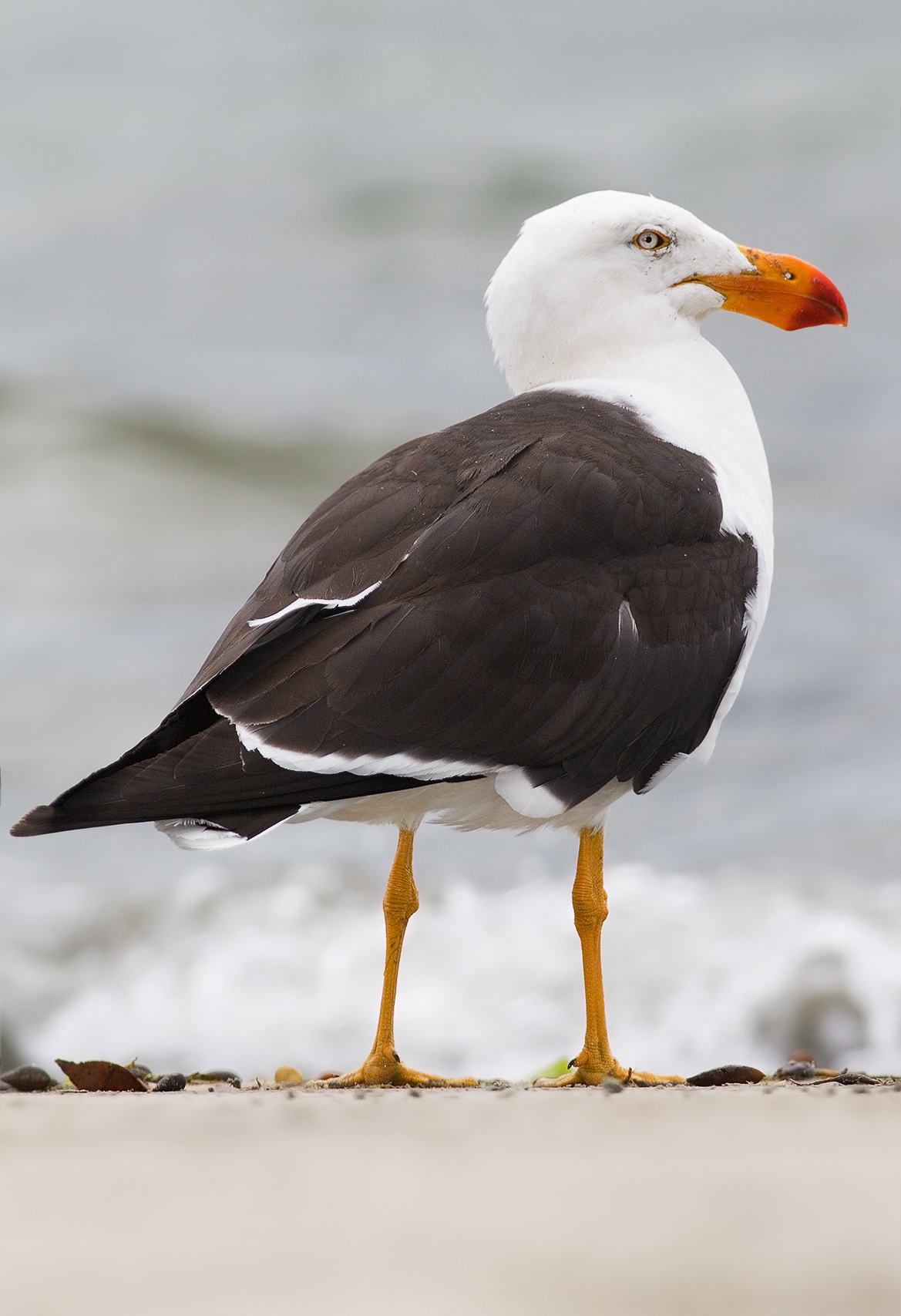
Pacific gull on the beach at Bruny Island

Gulls are typically medium to large birds, usually grey or white, often with black markings on the head or wings. They have stout, longish bills and webbed feet. The large species take up to four years to attain full adult plumage, but two years is typical for small gulls. In Tasmania, three species have been recorded. Terns are in general medium-to-large birds, typically with grey or white plumage, often with black markings on the head. They have longish bills and webbed feet. They are lighter-bodied and more streamlined than gulls and look elegant in flight with long tails and long narrow wings. In Tasmania, thirteen species of gulls and terns have been recorded, five of which are vagrants. The two groups have been considered separate families, but some findings that the noddies and white tern are offshoots to the combined group have led the two to be classified as a single family for the time being.

- Silver gull, Chroicocephalus novaehollandiae
- Laughing gull, Leucophaeus atricilla (V)
- Franklin's gull, Leucophaeus pipixcan (V)
- Pacific gull, Larus pacificus
- Kelp gull, Larus dominicanus
- Bridled tern, Onychoprion anaetheetus (V)
- Little tern, Sternula albifrons
- Australian fairy tern, Sternula nereis
- Gull-billed tern, Gelochelidon nilotica (V)
- Caspian tern, Hydroprogne caspia
- White-winged tern, Chlidonias leucopterus
- Whiskered tern, Chlidonias hybrida (V)
- White-fronted tern, Sterna striata
- Common tern, Sterna hirundo (V)
- Arctic tern, Sterna paradisaea (V)
- Antarctic tern, Sterna vittata (V)
- Great crested tern, Thalasseus bergii

== Tropicbirds ==
Order: Phaethontiformes Family: Phaethontidae

Tropicbirds are slender white birds of tropical oceans, with exceptionally long central tail feathers. Their long wings have black markings, as does the head. One species is a vagrant to Tasmanian waters.

- Red-tailed tropicbird, Phaethon rubricauda (V)

== Penguins ==
Order: Sphenisciformes Family: Spheniscidae

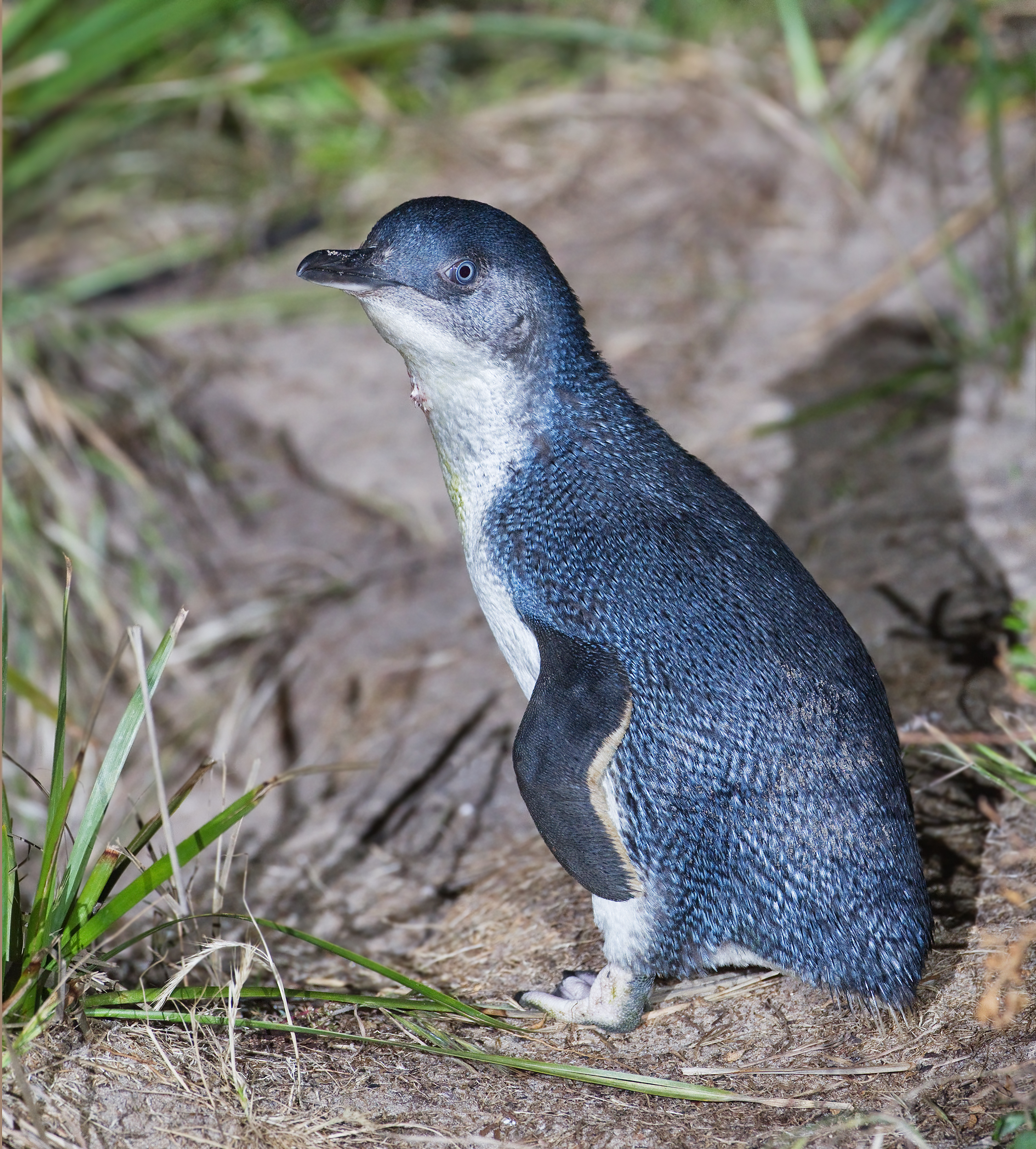
A wild little penguin returning to its burrow to feed its chicks on Bruny Island

Penguins are a group of aquatic, flightless birds living almost exclusively in the Southern Hemisphere, especially in Antarctica. One species breeds on the Tasmanian coast.

- King penguin, Aptenodytes patagonicus (V)
- Adelie penguin, Pygoscelis adeliae (V)
- Gentoo penguin, Pygoscelis papua (V)
- Chinstrap penguin, Pygoscelis antarctica (V)
- Little penguin, Eudyptula minor
- Fiordland penguin, Eudyptes pachyrhynchus (V)
- Erect-crested penguin, Eudyptes sclateri (V)
- Macaroni penguin, Eudyptes chrysolophus (V)
- Royal penguin, Eudyptes schlegeli (V)
- Southern rockhopper penguin, Eudyptula chrysocome (V)
- Moseley's rockhopper penguin, Eudyptula moseleyi (V)
- Snares penguin, Eudyptes robustus (V)

== Albatrosses ==
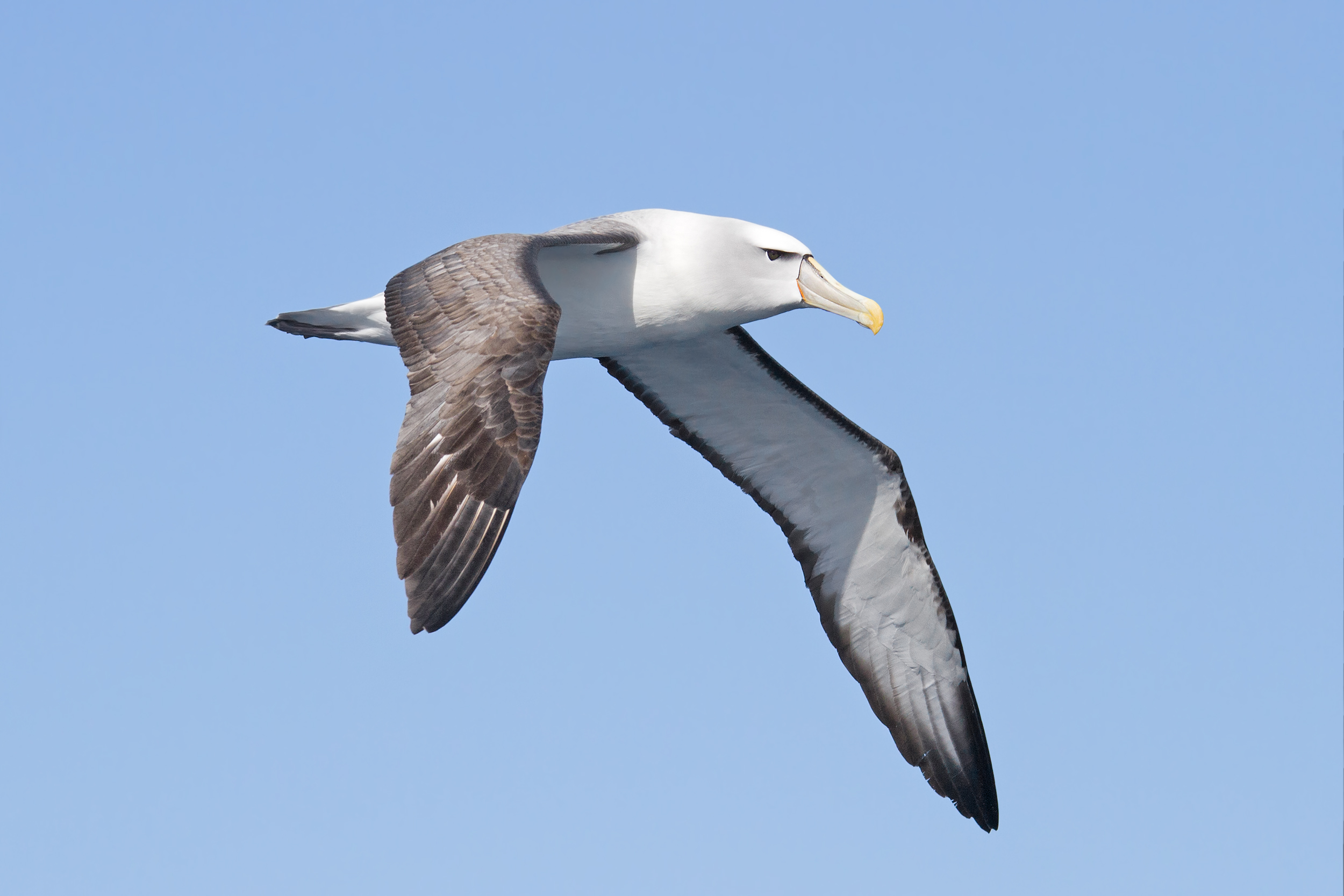
Shy albatross breed on three Tasmanian offshore islands

Order: Procellariiformes Family: Diomedeidae

The albatrosses are a family of large seabirds found across the Southern and North Pacific Oceans. The largest are among the largest flying birds in the world.

- Yellow-nosed albatross, Thalassarche chlororhynchos
- Grey-headed albatross, Thalassarche chrysostoma
- Buller's albatross, Thalassarche bulleri
- White-capped albatross, Thalassarche cauta
- Salvin's albatross, Thalassarche salvini (V)
- Chatham albatross, Thalassarche eremita (V)
- Black-browed albatross, Thalassarche melanophris
- Sooty albatross, Phoebetria fusca
- Light-mantled albatross, Phoebetria palpebrata
- Royal albatross, Diomedea epomophora
- Wandering albatross, Diomedea exulans

== Southern storm-petrels ==
Order: Procellariiformes Family: Oceanitidae

The southern storm-petrels are the smallest seabirds, relatives of the petrels, feeding on planktonic crustaceans and small fish picked from the surface, typically while hovering. Their flight is fluttering and sometimes bat-like.

- Wilson's storm-petrel, Oceanites oceanicus
- Grey-backed storm-petrel, Garrodia nereis
- White-faced storm-petrel, Pelagodroma marina
- White-bellied storm-petrel, Fregetta grallaria (V)
- New Zealand storm-petrel, Fregetta maoriana (V)
- Black-bellied storm-petrel, Fregetta tropica

== Shearwaters and petrels ==
Order: Procellariiformes Family: Procellariidae

The procellariids are the main group of medium-sized "true petrels", characterised by united nostrils with medium nasal septum and a long outer functional primary flight feather.

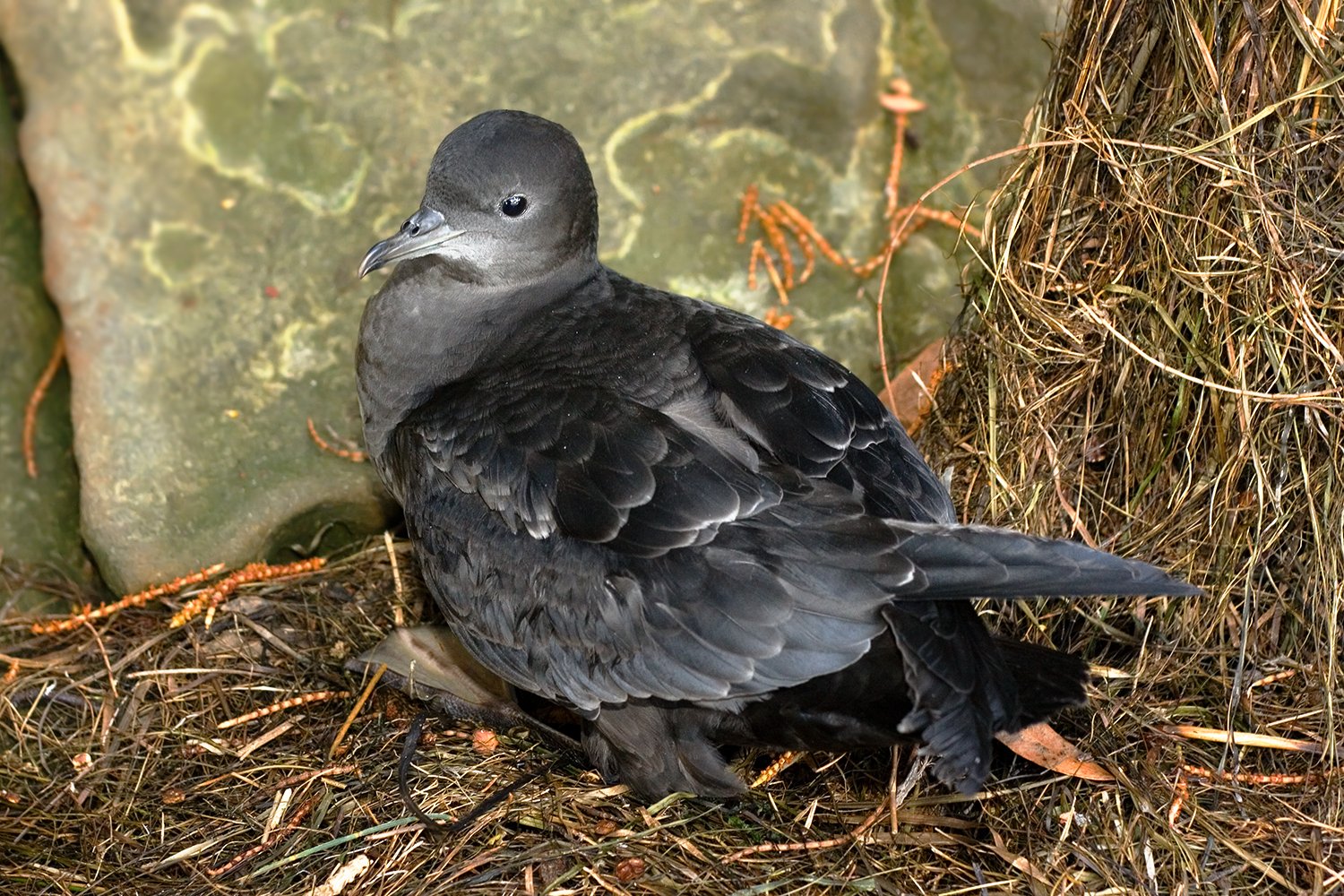
Short-tailed shearwater fledgling

- Southern giant-petrel, Macronectes giganteus
- Northern giant-petrel, Macronectes halli
- Southern fulmar, Fulmarus glacialoides (V)
- Antarctic petrel, Thalassoica antarctica (V)
- Cape petrel, Daption capense
- Snow petrel, Pagodroma nivea (V)
- Kerguelen petrel, Aphrodroma brevirostris
- Great-winged petrel, Pterodroma macroptera
- Grey-faced petrel, Pterodroma gouldi
- Kermadec petrel, Pterodroma neglecta (V)
- Herald petrel, Pterodroma heraldica (V)
- Providence petrel, Pterodroma solandri
- Soft-plumaged petrel, Pterodroma mollis
- White-headed petrel, Pterodroma lessonii
- Mottled petrel, Pterodroma inexpectata (V)
- Juan Fernandez petrel, Pterodroma externa (V)
- White-necked petrel, Pterodroma cervicalis
- Black-winged petrel, Pterodroma nigripennis (V)
- Cook's petrel, Pterodroma cookii (V)
- Gould's petrel, Pterodroma leucoptera
- Stejneger's petrel, Pterodroma longirostris (V)
- Blue petrel, Halobaena caerulea
- Fairy prion, Pachyptila turtur
- Broad-billed prion, Pachyptila vittata (V)
- Salvin's prion, Pachyptila salvini (V)
- Antarctic prion, Pachyptila desolata
- Slender-billed prion, Pachyptila belcheri
- Fulmar prion, Pachyptila crassirostris (V)
- Grey petrel, Procellaria cinerea (V)
- White-chinned petrel, Procellaria aequinoctialis
- Parkinson's petrel, Procellaria parkinsoni (V)
- Westland petrel, Procellaria westlandica (V)
- Flesh-footed shearwater, Ardenna carneipes (V)
- Great shearwater, Ardenna gravis (V)
- Wedge-tailed shearwater, Ardenna pacificus (V)
- Buller's shearwater, Ardenna bulleri (V)
- Sooty shearwater, Ardenna griseus
- Short-tailed shearwater, Ardenna tenuirostris
- Hutton's shearwater, Puffinus huttoni
- Fluttering shearwater, Puffinus gavia
- Little shearwater, Puffinus assimilis
- Subantarctic shearwater, Puffinus elegans
- Common diving-petrel, Pelecanoides urinatrix

== Frigatebirds ==
Order: Suliformes Family: Fregatidae

Frigatebirds are large seabirds usually found over tropical oceans. They are large, black, or black-and-white, with long wings and deeply forked tails. The males have coloured inflatable throat pouches. They do not swim or walk and cannot take off from a flat surface. Having the largest wingspan-to-body-weight ratio of any bird, they are essentially aerial, able to stay aloft for more than a week.

- Lesser frigatebird, Fregata ariel (V)
- Great frigatebird, Fregata minor (V)

== Boobies and gannets ==
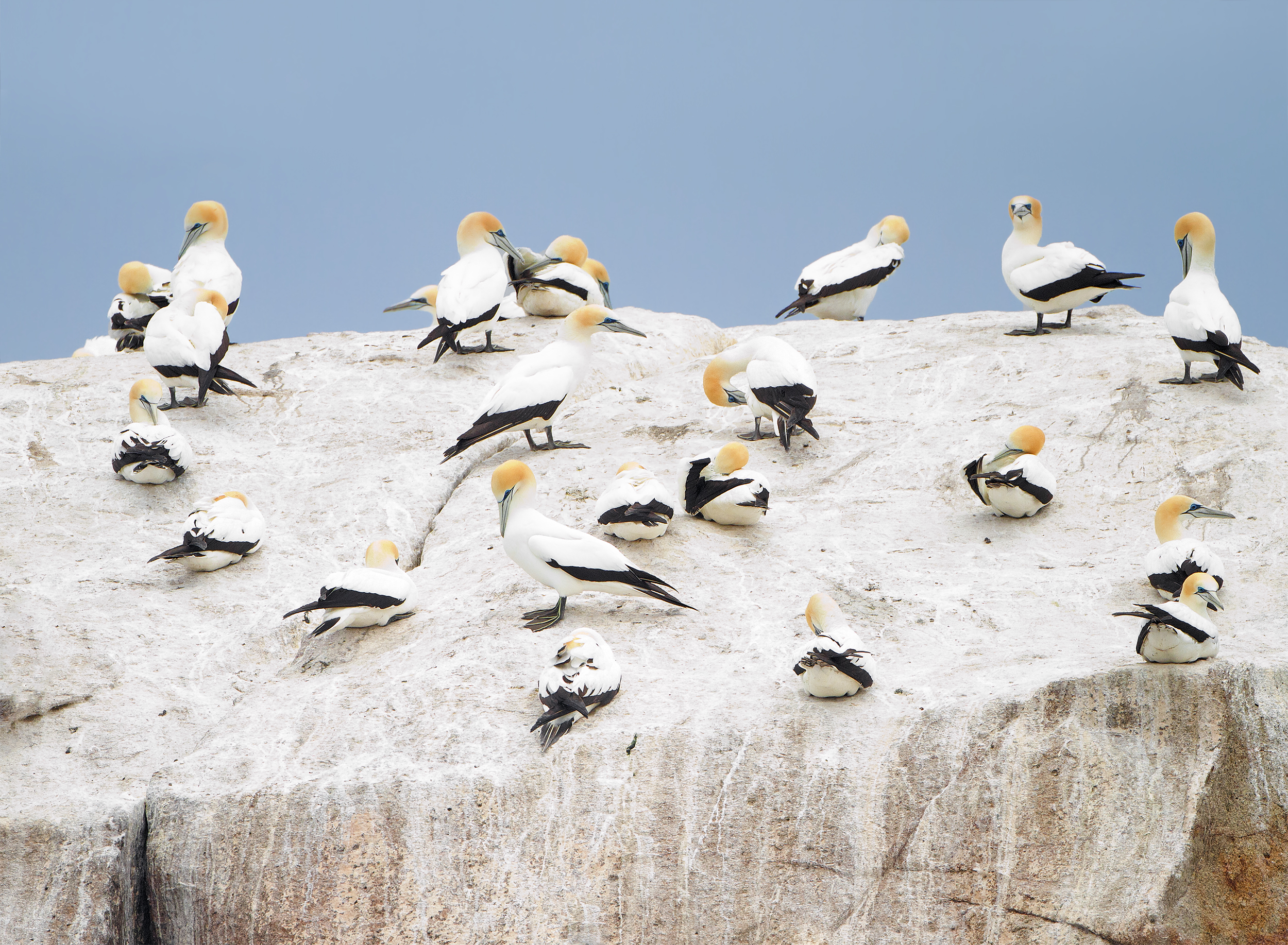
Australasian gannet (Morus serrator), Cheverton Rock, Tasmania, Australia

Order: Suliformes Family: Sulidae

The sulids comprise the gannets and boobies. Both groups are medium-large coastal seabirds that plunge-dive for fish.

- Brown booby, Sula leucogaster (V)
- Australasian gannet, Morus serrator

== Anhingas ==
Order: Suliformes Family: Anhingidae

Darters are cormorant-like water birds with long necks and long, straight bills. They are fish eaters which often swim with only their neck above the water. One species is a vagrant to Tasmania.

- Australasian darter, Anhinga novaehollandiae (V)

== Cormorants and shags ==
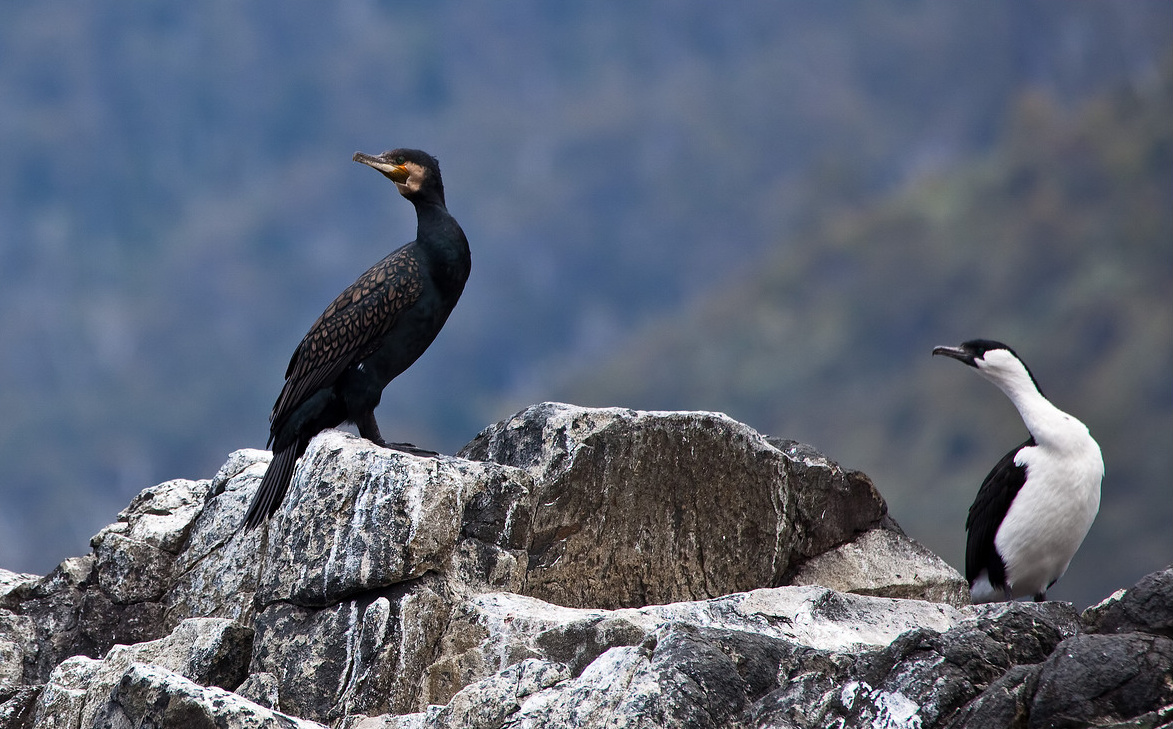
Great cormorant (left) and black-faced cormorant (right)

Order: Suliformes Family: Phalacrocoracidae

Cormorants are medium-to-large aquatic birds, usually with mainly dark plumage and areas of coloured skin on the face. The bill is long, thin and sharply hooked. Their feet are four-toed and webbed, a distinguishing feature among the order Pelecaniformes.

- Little pied cormorant, Microcarbo melanoleucos
- Great cormorant, Phalacrocorax carbo
- Little black cormorant, Phalacrocorax sulcirostris
- Pied cormorant, Phalacrocorax varius (V)
- Black-faced cormorant, Phalacrocorax fuscescens

== Pelicans ==
Order: Pelecaniformes Family: Pelecanidae

Pelicans are large water birds with distinctive pouches under their bills. Like other birds in the order Pelecaniformes, they have four webbed toes. One species has been recorded in Tasmania.

- Australian pelican, Pelecanus conspicillatus

== Herons, egrets, and bitterns ==
Order: Pelecaniformes Family: Ardeidae

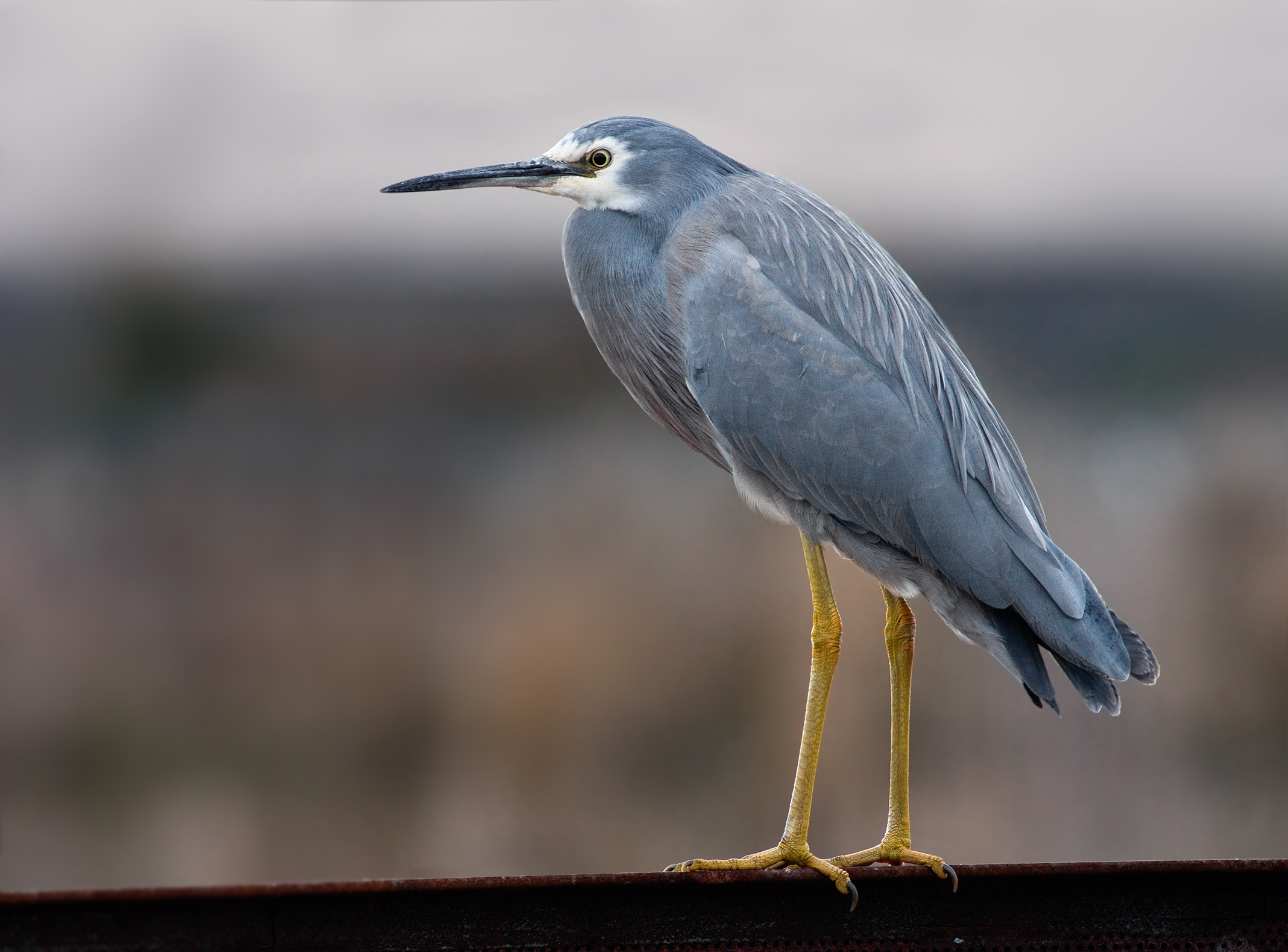
White-faced heron

The family Ardeidae contains the herons, egrets and bitterns. Herons and egrets are medium to large wading birds with long necks and legs. Bitterns tend to be shorter-necked and more secretive. Members of Ardeidae fly with their necks retracted, unlike other long-necked birds such as storks, ibises and spoonbills.

- Australasian bittern, Botaurus poiciloptilus
- Pacific heron, Ardea pacifica
- Great egret, Ardea alba
- Intermediate egret, Ardea intermedia (V)
- White-faced heron, Egretta novaehollandiae
- Little egret, Egretta garzetta
- Pacific reef-heron, Egretta sacra (V)
- Cattle egret, Bubulcus ibis
- Nankeen night-heron, Nycticorax caledonicus

== Ibises and spoonbills ==
Order: Pelecaniformes Family: Threskiornithidae

The family Threskiornithidae includes the ibises and spoonbills. They have long, broad wings. Their bodies tend to be elongated, the neck more so, with rather long legs. The bill is also long, decurved in the case of the ibises, straight and distinctively flattened in the spoonbills.

- Glossy ibis, Plegadis falcinellus (V)
- Australian ibis, Threskiornis molucca (V)
- Straw-necked ibis, Threskiornis spinicollis (V)
- Royal spoonbill, Platalea regia
- Yellow-billed spoonbill, Platalea flavipes (V)

== Osprey ==
Order: Accipitriformes Family: Pandionidae

The family Pandionidae contains only one species, the osprey. The osprey is a medium-large raptor which is a specialist fish-eater with a worldwide distribution.

- Osprey, Pandion haliaetus (V)

== Hawks, eagles, and kites ==
Order: Accipitriformes Family: Accipitridae

Accipitridae is a family of birds of prey, which includes hawks, eagles, kites, harriers and Old World vultures. These birds have large powerful hooked beaks for tearing flesh from their prey, strong legs, powerful talons and keen eyesight.

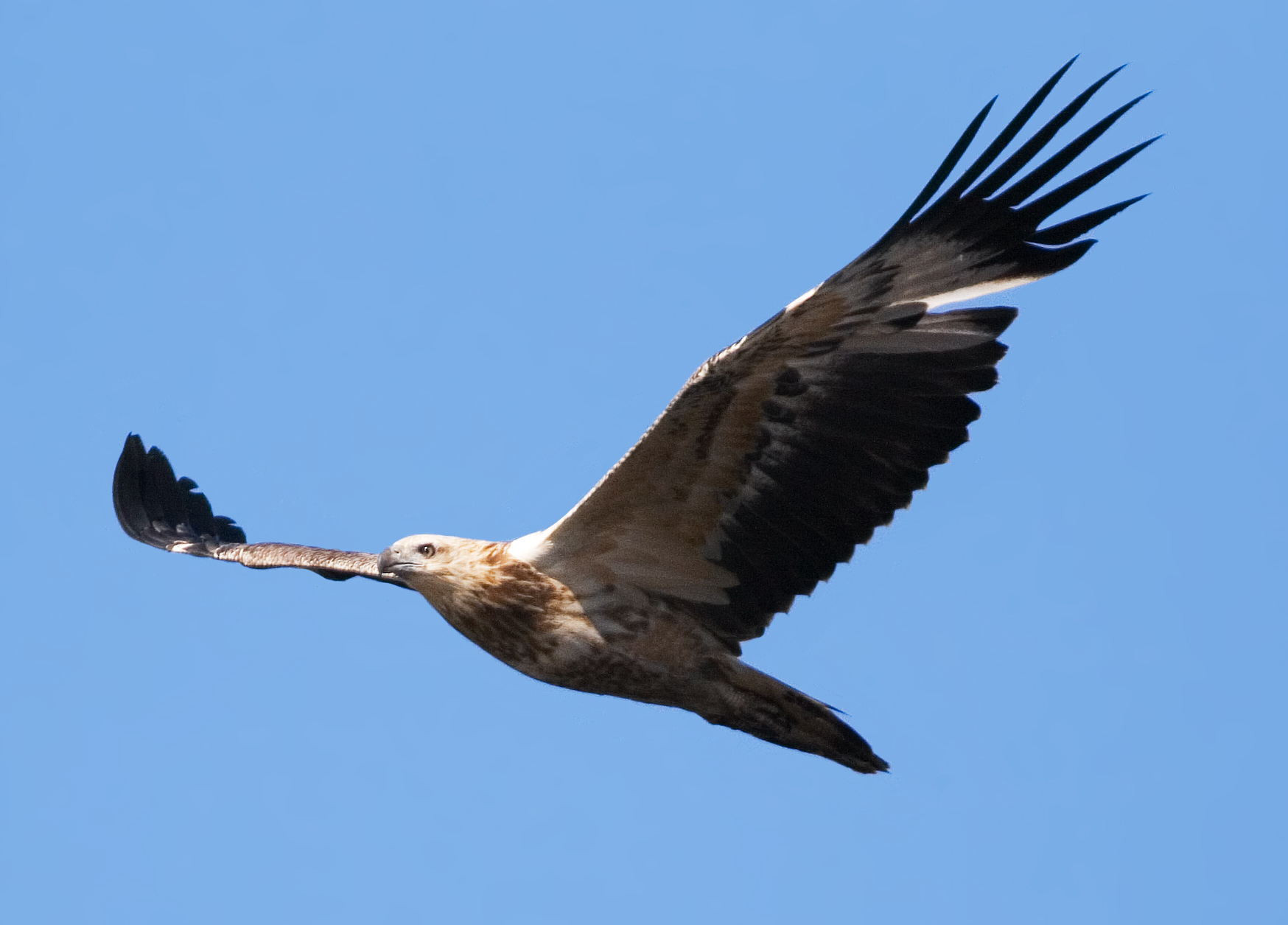
juvenile white-bellied sea eagle in flight, River Derwent

- Black-shouldered kite, Elanus axillaris (V)
- Black-breasted kite, Hamirostra melanosternon (V)
- Little eagle, Hieraaetus morphnoides (V)
- Wedge-tailed eagle, Aquila audax
  - Tasmanian wedge-tailed eagle, A. a. fleayi (E)
- Swamp harrier, Circus approximans
- Spotted harrier, Circus assimilis (V)
- Grey goshawk, Accipiter novaehollandiae
- Brown goshawk, Accipiter fasciatus
- Collared sparrowhawk, Accipiter cirrocephalus
- Black kite, Milvus migrans (V)
- Whistling kite, Haliastur sphenurus (V)
- White-bellied sea-eagle, Haliaeetus leucogaster

== Barn owls ==
Order: Strigiformes Family: Tytonidae

Barn owls are medium to large owls with large heads and characteristic heart-shaped faces. They have long strong legs with powerful talons.

- Barn owl, Tyto alba (V)
- Australian masked owl, Tyto novaehollandiae
- Sooty owl, Tyto tenebricosa (V)

== Owls ==
Order: Strigiformes Family: Strigidae

The typical owls are small to large solitary nocturnal birds of prey. They have large forward-facing eyes and ears, a hawk-like beak and a conspicuous circle of feathers around each eye called a facial disk.

- Barking owl, Ninox connivens (V)
- Tasmanian boobook, Ninox leucopsis (E)

== Kingfishers ==
Order: Coraciiformes Family: Alcedinidae

Kingfishers are medium-sized birds with large heads, long pointed bills, short legs and stubby tails.

- Azure kingfisher, Ceyx azurea
- Laughing kookaburra, Dacelo novaeguineae (I)
- Red-backed kingfisher, Todiramphus pyrrhopygius (V)
- Forest kingfisher, Todiramphus macleayii (V)
- Sacred kingfisher, Todiramphus sanctus

== Bee-eaters ==
Order: Coraciiformes Family: Meropidae

The bee-eaters are a group of near passerine birds in the family Meropidae. Most species are found in Africa but others occur in southern Europe, Madagascar, Australia, and New Guinea. They are characterised by richly coloured plumage, slender bodies, and usually elongated central tail feathers. All are colourful and have long downturned bills and pointed wings, which give them a swallow-like appearance when seen from afar.

- Rainbow bee-eater, Merops ornatus (V)

== Rollers ==
Order: Coraciiformes Family: Coraciidae

Rollers resemble crows in size and build, but are more closely related to the kingfishers and bee-eaters. They share the colourful appearance of those groups with blues and browns predominating. The two inner front toes are connected, but the outer toe is not.

- Dollarbird, Eurystomus orientalis (V)

== Falcons and caracaras ==
Order: Falconiformes Family: Falconidae

Falconidae is a family of diurnal birds of prey, notably the falcons and caracaras. They differ from hawks, eagles and kites in that they kill with their beaks instead of their talons.

- Nankeen kestrel, Falco cenchroides
- Australian hobby, Falco longipennis
- Brown falcon, Falco berigora
- Black falcon, Falco subniger (V)
- Peregrine falcon, Falco peregrinus

== Cockatoos ==
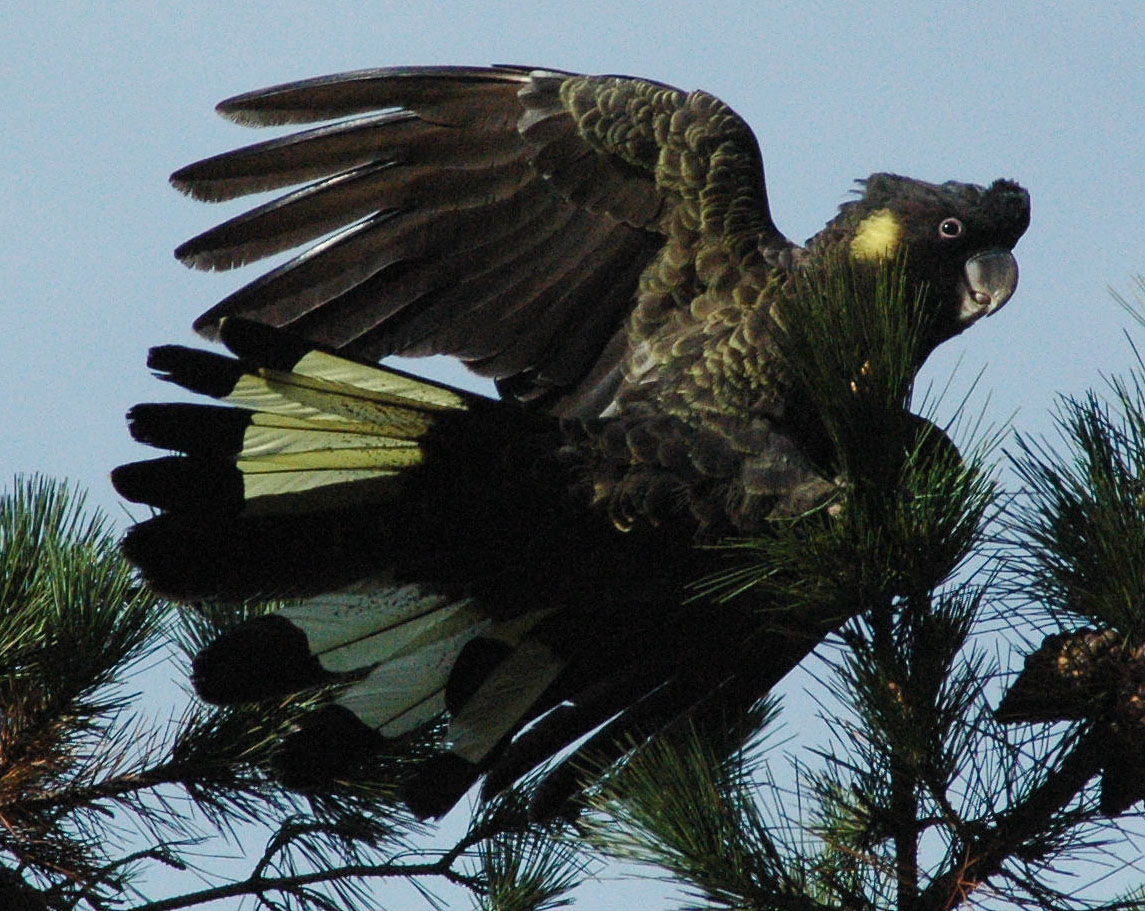
Yellow-tailed black cockatoo, Calyptorhynchus funereus xanthanota

Order: Psittaciformes Family: Cacatuidae

Cockatoos are a distinctive lineage of parrots notable for their crests and lack of colour in their plumage. Generally large and noisy, they are a familiar part of the Australian (and Tasmanian) landscape.

- Yellow-tailed black cockatoo, Calyptorhynchus funereus
  - Southern yellow-tailed black cockatoo, C. f. xanthanota
- Gang-gang cockatoo, Callocephalon fimbriatum (V)
- Pink cockatoo, Callocephalon leadbeateri (V)
- Galah, Eolophus roseicapilla (I)
- Long-billed corella, Cacatua tenuirostris (I)
- Little corella, Cacatua sanguinea (I)
- Sulphur-crested cockatoo, Cacatua galerita

== Old World parrots ==
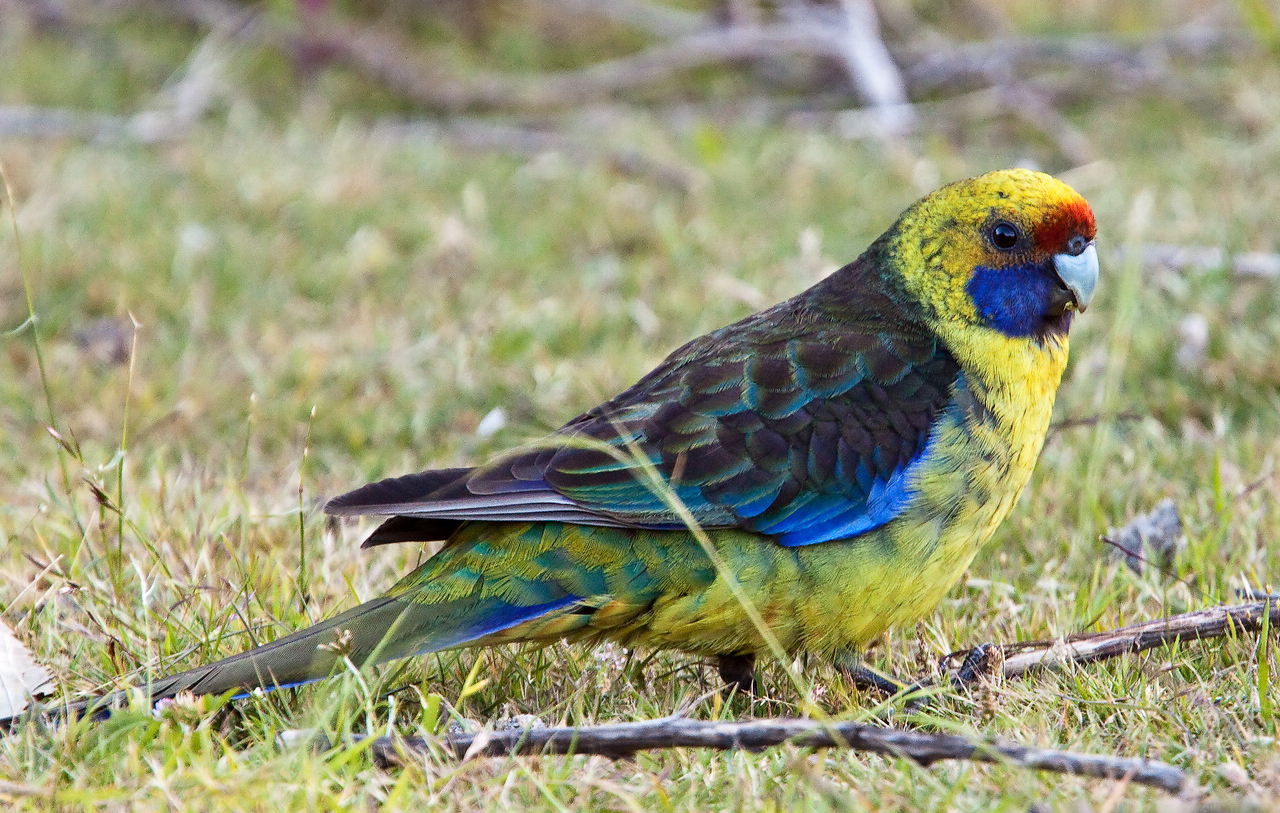
Green rosella

Order: Psittaciformes Family: Psittaculidae

Characteristic features of parrots include a strong curved bill, an upright stance, strong legs, and clawed zygodactyl feet. Many parrots are vividly coloured, and some are multi-coloured. In size they range from 8 cm (3.1 in) to 1 m (3.3 ft) in length. Old World parrots are found from Africa east across south and southeast Asia and Oceania to Australia and New Zealand.

- Australian king-parrot, Alisterus scapularis (V)
- Ground parrot, Pezoporus wallicus
- Blue-winged parrot, Neophema chrysostoma
- Orange-bellied parrot, Neophema chrysogaster
- Swift parrot, Lathamus discolor
- Green rosella, Platycercus caledonicus (E)
- Crimson rosella, Platycercus elegans (V)
- Eastern rosella, Platycercus eximius
- Musk lorikeet, Glossopsitta concinna
- Little lorikeet, Parvipsitta pusilla (V)
- Rainbow lorikeet, Trichoglossus haemotodus (I)

== Lyrebirds ==
Order: Passeriformes Family: Menuridae

The lyrebirds are two species of ground-dwelling Australian birds, notable for their accomplished mimicry. One species has been introduced to Tasmania.

- Superb lyrebird, Menura novaehollandiae (I) (Note: Although native to eastern Australia, introduced to Tasmania)

== Australasian treecreepers ==
Order: Passeriformes Family: Climacteridae

The Climacteridae are medium-small, mostly brown-coloured birds with patterning on their underparts.

- White-throated treecreeper, Cormobates leucophaea (V)

== Fairywrens ==
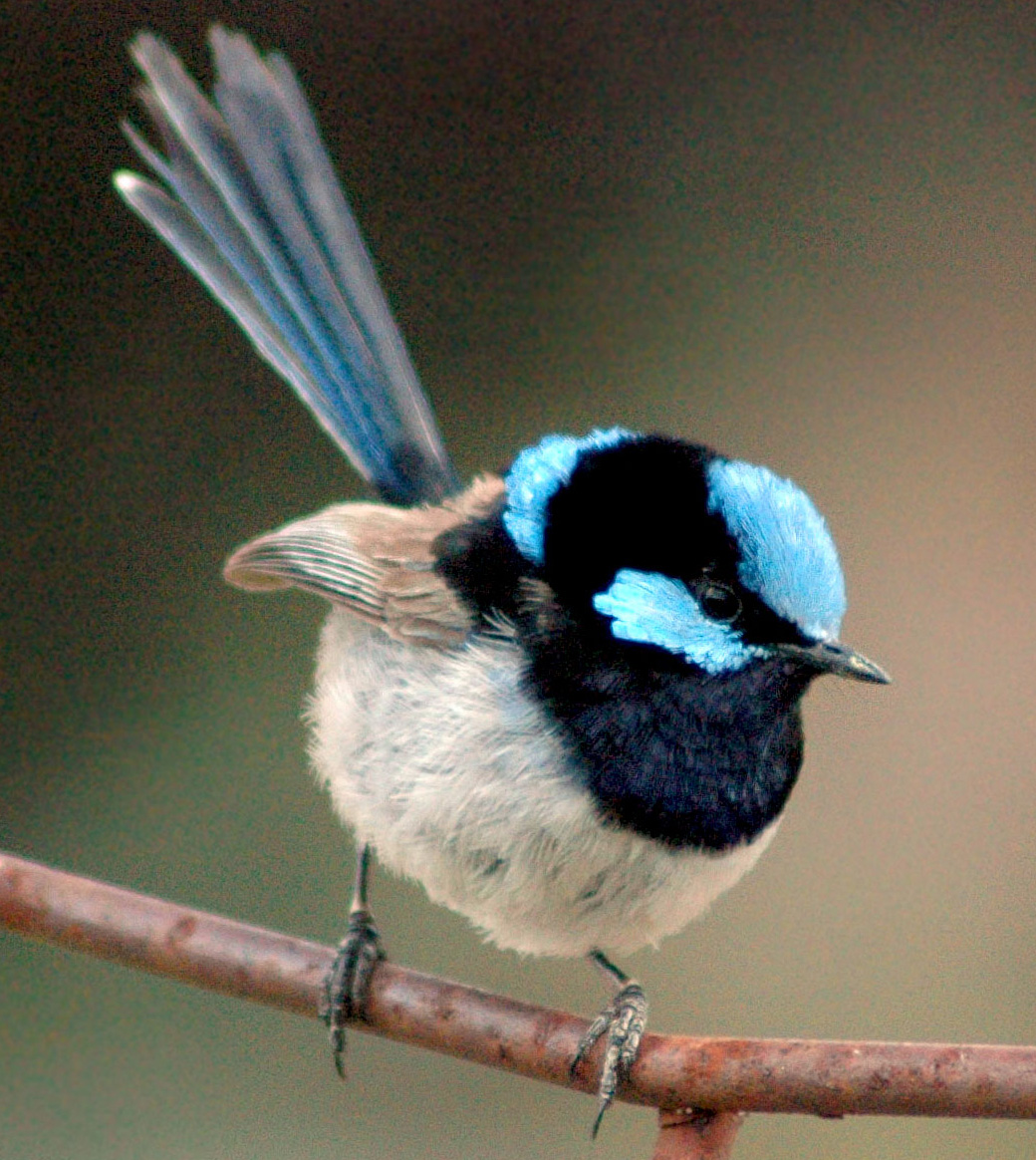
Superb fairywren, Malurus cyaneus cyaneus

Order: Passeriformes Family: Maluridae

The fairywrens are a family of small, insectivorous passerine birds endemic to Australia and New Guinea. Most closely related to honeyeaters and pardalotes, they are more closely related to crows than to true wrens of the Northern Hemisphere. Two species are native to Tasmania.

- Southern emuwren, Stipiturus malachurus
- Superb fairywren, Malurus cyaneus

== Honeyeaters ==
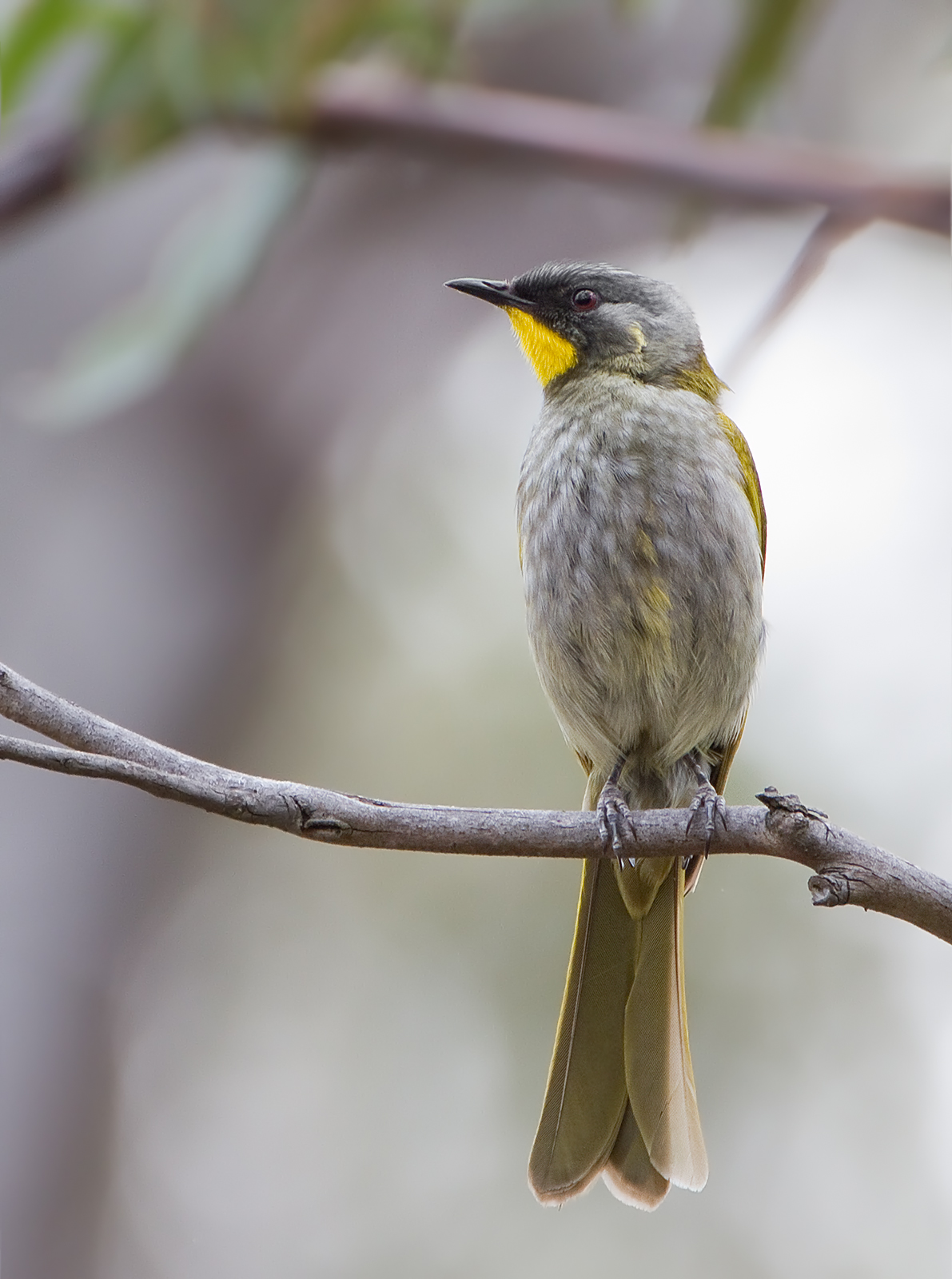
Yellow-throated honeyeater at Austins Ferry, Tasmania

Order: Passeriformes Family: Meliphagidae

Honeyeaters are a diverse and widespread group of nectar and insect-eating birds found across Australia and surrounding regions. Eleven species are found in Tasmania, of which four are endemic, including Australia's largest honeyeater, the yellow wattlebird.

- Eastern spinebill, Acanthorhynchus tenuirostris
- Yellow-faced honeyeater, Caligavis chrysops (V)
- Noisy miner, Manorina melanocephala
- Yellow-throated miner, Manorina flavigula (V)
- Little wattlebird, Anthochaera chrysoptera
- Red wattlebird, Anthochaera carunculata (V)
- Yellow wattlebird, Anthochaera paradoxa (E)
- White-plumed honeyeater, Ptilotula penicillata (V)
- White-fronted chat, Epthianura albifrons
- Scarlet myzomela, Myzomela sanguinolenta (V)
- Tawny-crowned honeyeater, Gliciphila melanops
- Crescent honeyeater, Phylidonyris pyrrhoptera
- New Holland honeyeater, Phylidonyris novaehollandiae
- White-cheeked honeyeater, Phylidonyris niger (V)
- White-eared honeyeater, Nesoptilotis leucotis (V)
- Yellow-throated honeyeater, Nesoptilotis flavicollis (E)
- White-naped honeyeater, Melithreptus lunatus (V)
- Black-headed honeyeater, Melithreptus affinis (E)
- Brown-headed honeyeater, Melithreptus brevirostris (V)
- Strong-billed honeyeater, Melithreptus validirostris (E)

== Pardalotes ==
Order: Passeriformes Family: Pardalotidae

The pardalotes are a small family of very small, brightly coloured birds native to Australia, with short tails, strong legs and stubby blunt beaks. They feed on insects, generally in the canopy of eucalypts and nest in burrows. Three species are found in Tasmania, of which one is endemic and endangered.

- Spotted pardalote, Pardalotus punctatus
- Forty-spotted pardalote, Pardalotus quadragintus (E)
- Striated pardalote, Pardalotus striatus

== Thornbills and allies ==
Order: Passeriformes Family: Acanthizidae

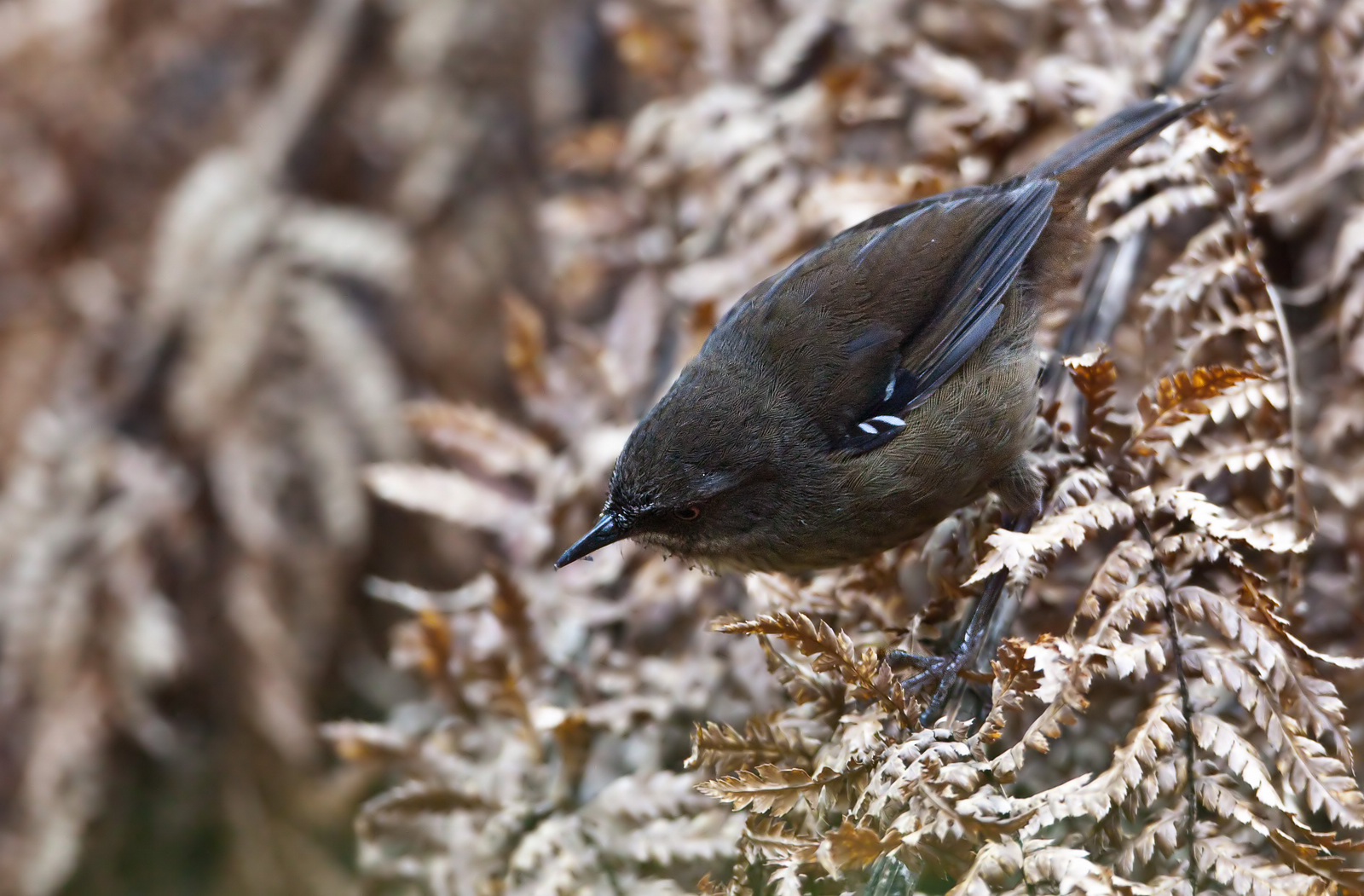
Tasmanian scrubwren

The Acanthizidae are a group of 35 species of small to medium mostly insectivorous passerine birds found in Australia, Indonesia, New Zealand and the southwest Pacific. They have short rounded wings, slender bills, long legs and a short tail. Most species have olive, grey or brown plumage, although some have patches of a brighter yellow. Six species are found in Tasmania, of which three are endemic.

- White-browed scrubwren, Sericornis frontalis
- Tasmanian scrubwren, Sericornis humilis (E)
- Scrubtit, Acanthornis magnus (E)
- Speckled warbler, Pyrrholaemus sagittatus (V)
- Striated fieldwren, Calamanthus fuliginosus
- Brown thornbill, Acanthiza pusilla
- Tasmanian thornbill, Acanthiza ewingii (E)
- Yellow-rumped thornbill, Acanthiza chrysorrhoa
- Striated thornbill, Acanthiza lineata (V)

== Quail-thrushes and jewel-babblers ==
Order: Passeriformes Family: Cinclosomatidae

The quail-thrushes are medium-sized songbirds found in open forest and scrub. Adapted for ground living, they have strong legs and beaks. They are now usually classified in the family Cinclosomatidae along with jewel-babblers. One species reaches Tasmania.

- Spotted quail-thrush, Cinclosoma punctatum

== Cuckooshrikes ==
Order: Passeriformes Family: Campephagidae

The cuckooshrikes are a family of predominantly drab-coloured insectivorous birds from Australia and Southeast Asia that are related to neither cuckoos nor shrikes.

- Black-faced cuckooshrike, Coracina novaehollandiae
- White-bellied cuckooshrike, Coracina papuensis (V)
- White-winged triller, Lalage tricolor (V)
- Varied triller, Lalage leucomela (V)

== Whipbirds and wedgebills ==
Order: Passeriformes Family: Psophodidae

The Psophodidae is a family containing whipbirds and wedgebills.

- Eastern whipbird, Psophodes olivaceus (V)

== Shrike-tits ==
Order: Passeriformes Family: Falcunculidae

The shrike-tits have a parrot-like bill, used for distinctive bark-stripping behaviour, which gains it access to invertebrates.

- Eastern shrike-tit, Falcunculus frontatus (V)

== Whistlers and allies ==
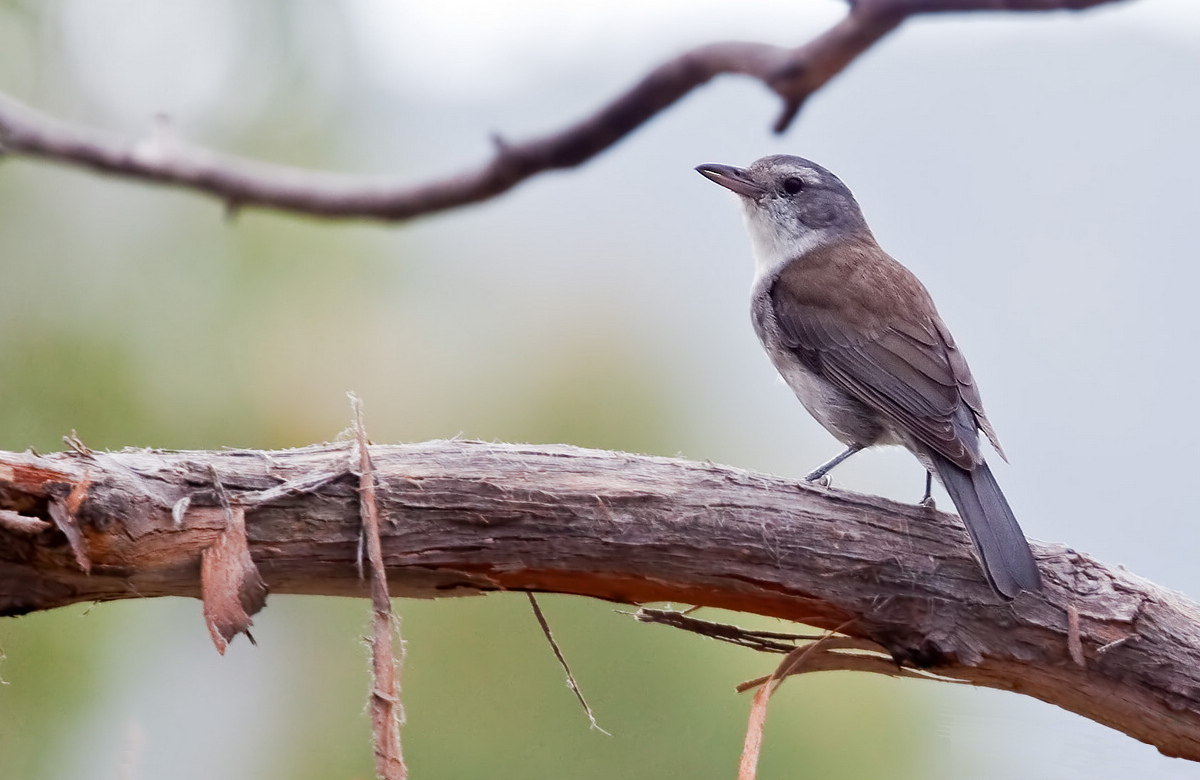
Grey shrikethrush

Order: Passeriformes Family: Pachycephalidae

The whistlers, shrikethrushes, and some of the pitohuis are a large group of stocky passerines found in Australia and surrounding regions. Primarily insectivorous, larger species may also eat small vertebrates such as frogs or nestling birds. Most have drab plumage, the golden whistler a notable exception, and several are accomplished songsters.

- Grey shrikethrush, Colluricincla harmonica
- Olive whistler, Pachycephala olivacea
- Golden whistler, Pachycephala pectoralis
- Rufous whistler, Pachycephala rufiventris (V)

== Old World orioles ==
Order: Passeriformes Family: Oriolidae

The Old World orioles are colourful passerine birds. They are not related to the New World orioles.

- Olive-backed oriole, Oriolus sagittatus (V)
- Australasian figbird, Sphecotheres vieilloti (V)

== Woodswallows, bellmagpies, and allies ==
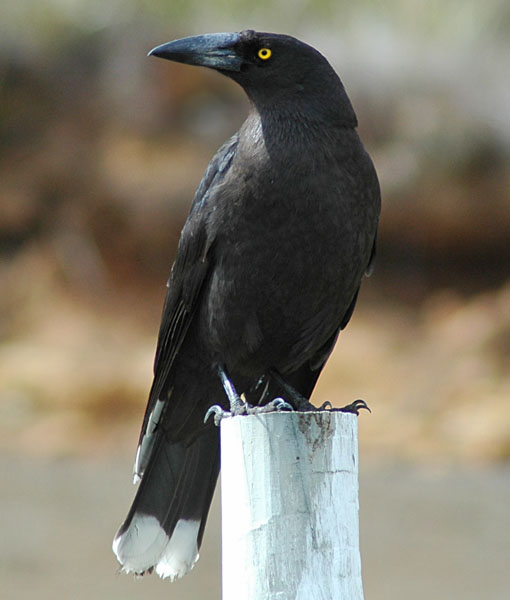
Black currawong

Order: Passeriformes Family: Artamidae

Now known to be related to the Vangidae of Madagascar, the Artamidae are a collection of crow-like birds as well as the smaller woodswallows. They include some of the most familiar and most accomplished songbirds of the Australian (and Tasmanian) landscape. Six species are found in Tasmania.

- White-breasted woodswallow, Artamus leucorynchus (V) (Note: HANZAB 7, p. 402.)
- Masked woodswallow, Artamus personatus (V)
- White-browed woodswallow, Artamus superciliosus (V)
- Dusky woodswallow, Artamus cyanopterus
- Grey butcherbird, Cracticus torquatus
- Australian magpie, Gymnorhina tibicen
- Pied currawong, Strepera graculina (V)
- Black currawong, Strepera fuliginosa (E)
- Grey currawong, Strepera versicolor

== Fantails ==
Order: Passeriformes Family: Rhipiduridae

Fantails are a family of small insectivorous birds of southern Asia and Australasia related to monarchs and drongos (all three are sometimes combined in the one family).

- Willie wagtail, Rhipidura leucophrys (Note: HANZAB 7, p. 228.) (V)
- Rufous fantail, Rhipidura rufifrons (V)
- Grey fantail, Rhipidura fuliginosa

== Drongos ==
Order: Passeriformes Family: Dicruridae

The drongos are mostly black or dark grey in colour, sometimes with metallic tints. They have long forked tails, and some Asian species have elaborate tail decorations. They have short legs and sit very upright when perched, like a shrike. They flycatch or take prey from the ground.

- Spangled drongo, Dicrurus bracteatus (V)

== Monarch flycatchers ==
Order: Passeriformes Family: Monarchidae

The monarch flycatchers are a diverse family of around 140 species of passerine birds found from Africa to Australia. Closely related to the drongo family Dicruridae, they are sometimes classified as a subfamily within it. Monarchs generally live in the canopy or understory in forest habitats, although one species is ground-dwelling.

- Magpie-lark, Grallina cyanoleuca (V)
- Leaden flycatcher, Myiagra rubecula (V)
- Satin flycatcher, Myiagra cyanoleuca
- Restless flycatcher, Myiagra inquieta (V)

== White-winged chough and apostlebird ==
Order: Passeriformes Family: Corcoracidae

They are found in open habitat in eastern Australia, mostly open eucalypt woodlands and some forest that lacks a closed canopy. They are highly social, spend much of their time foraging through leaf litter with a very distinctive gait, calling to one another almost constantly.

- White-winged chough, Corcorax melanorhamphos (V)

== Crows, jays, and magpies ==
Order: Passeriformes Family: Corvidae

The family Corvidae includes crows, ravens, jays, choughs, magpies, treepies, nutcrackers and ground jays. Corvids are above average in size among the Passeriformes, and some of the larger species show high levels of intelligence. Two black-plumaged ravens are found in Tasmania.

- Little raven, Corvus mellori
- Forest raven, Corvus tasmanicus

== Australasian robins ==
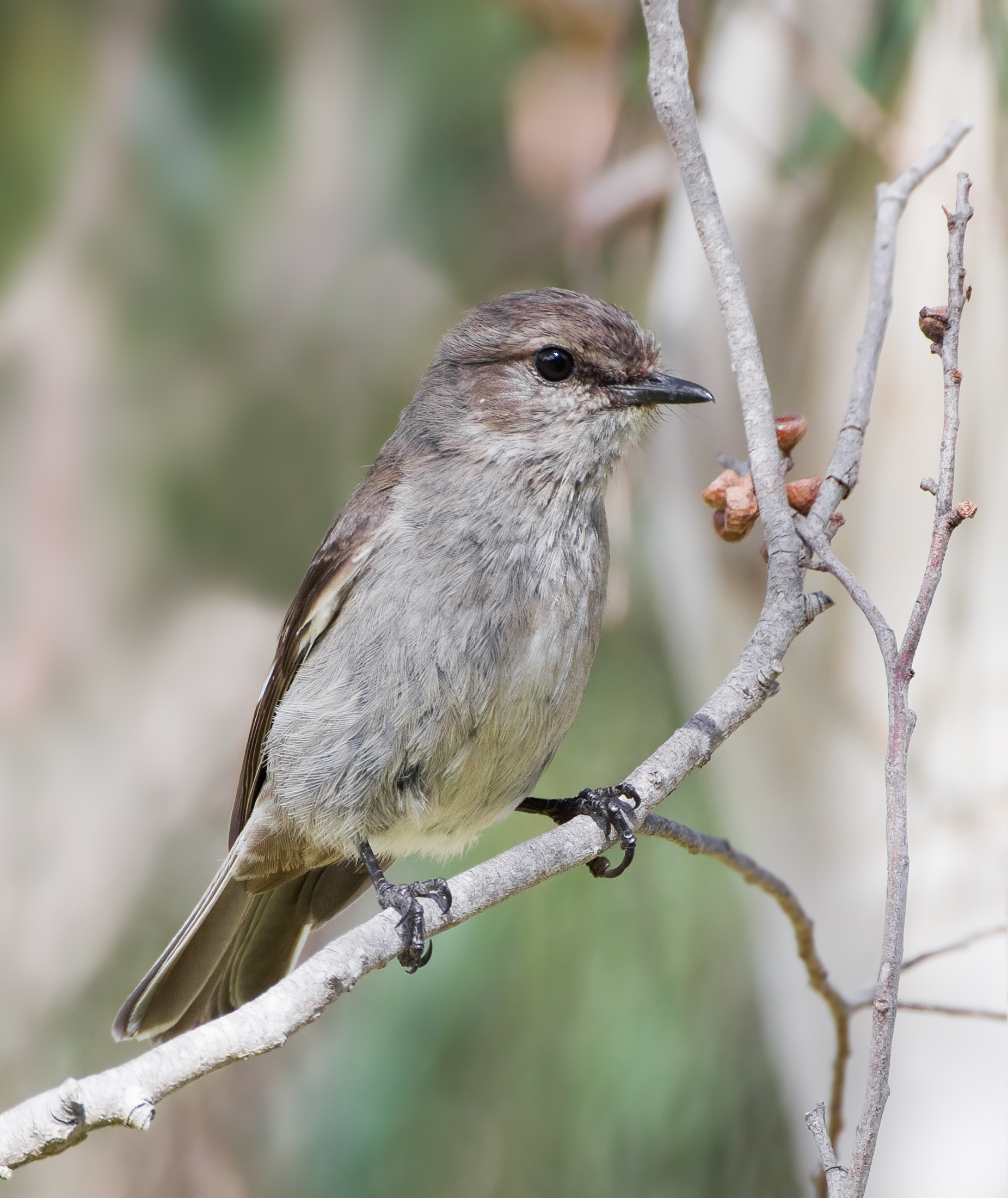
Dusky robin

Order: Passeriformes Family: Petroicidae

Australasian robins are a group of small insectivorous birds, whose exact position in the bird family tree is unclear. Named after a superficial resemblance to the European robin, the males of many species sport bright red or pink on their plumage.

- Scarlet robin, Petroica boodang
- Flame robin, Petroica phoenicea
- Rose robin, Petroica rosea (V)
- Pink robin, Petroica rodinogaster
- Dusky robin, Melanodryas vittata (E)
- Eastern yellow robin, Eopsaltria australis (V)

== Larks ==
Order: Passeriformes Family: Alaudidae

Larks are small terrestrial birds with often extravagant songs and display flights. Most larks are fairly dull in appearance. They feed on insects and seeds.

- Horsfield's bushlark, Mirafra javanica (V)
- Eurasian skylark, Alauda arvensis (I)

== Cisticolas and allies ==
Order: Passeriformes Family: Cisticolidae

The cisticolas and allies are family of about 110 small passerine birds found mainly in warmer southern regions of the Old World. They are often included within the Old World warbler family Sylviidae. One species reaches Tasmania.

- Golden-headed cisticola, Cisticola exilis

== Reed warblers and allies ==
Order: Passeriformes Family: Acrocephalidae

The members of this family are usually rather large for "warblers". Most are rather plain olivaceous brown above with much yellow to beige below. They are usually found in open woodland, reedbeds, or tall grass. The family occurs mostly in southern to western Eurasia and surroundings, but it also ranges far into the Pacific, with some species in Africa.

- Australian reed warbler, Acrocephalus australis

== Grassbirds and allies ==
Order: Passeriformes Family: Locustellidae

Locustellidae, commonly known as grassbirds, songlarks and megalurid warblers, is a newly recognized family of small insectivorous songbirds related to the Old World warblers.

- Little grassbird, Poodytes gramineus
- Brown songlark, Cincloramphus cruralis (V)
- Tawny grassbird, Cincloramphus timoriensis (V)

== Swallows ==
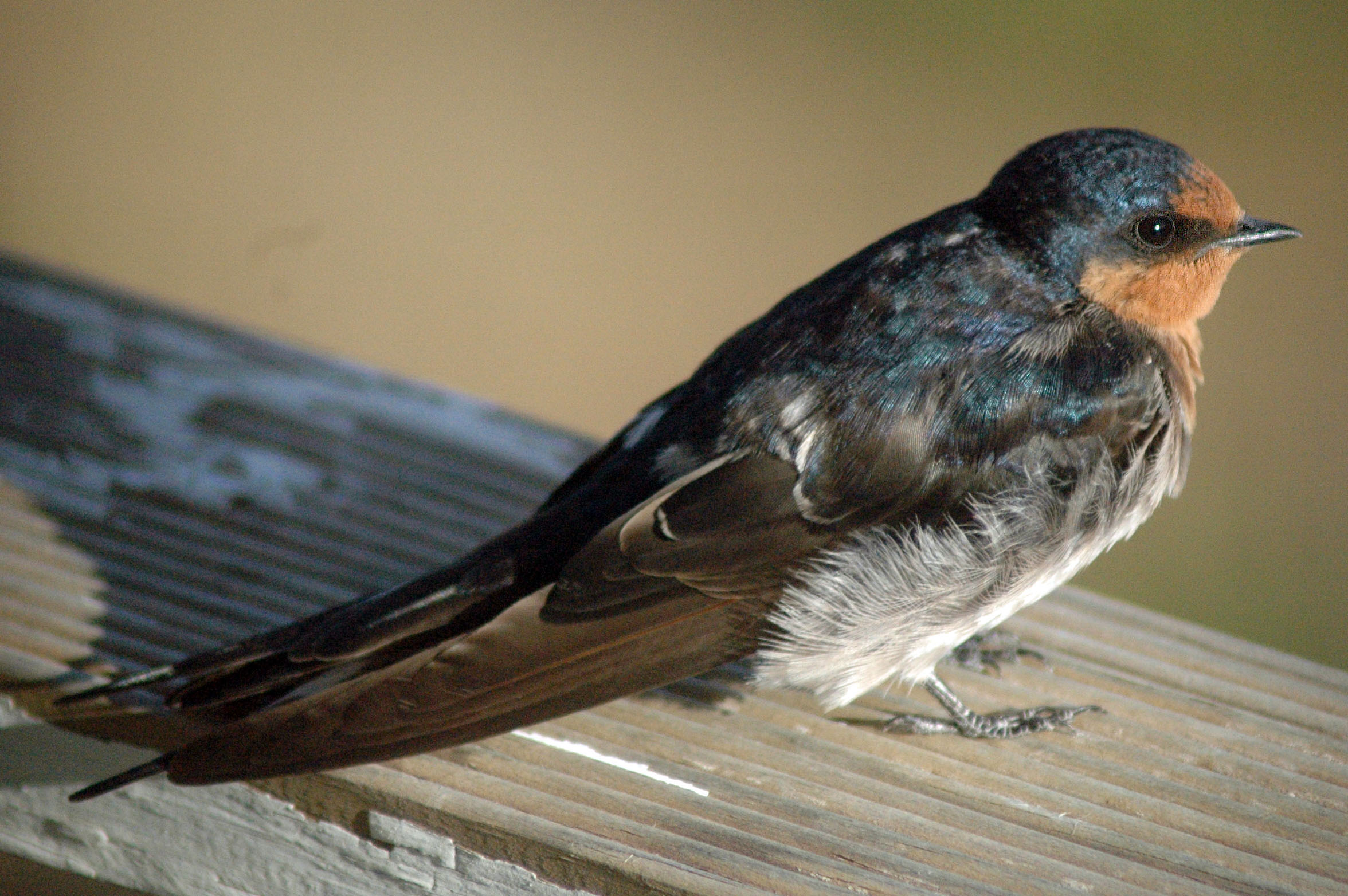
Welcome swallow

Order: Passeriformes Family: Hirundinidae

The family Hirundinidae is adapted to aerial feeding. They have a slender streamlined body, long pointed wings and a short bill with a wide gape. The feet are adapted to perching rather than walking and the front toes are partially joined at the base.

- Welcome swallow, Hirundo neoxena
- Fairy martin, Petrochelidon ariel (V)
- Tree martin, Petrochelidon nigricans

== White-eyes, yuhinas, and allies ==
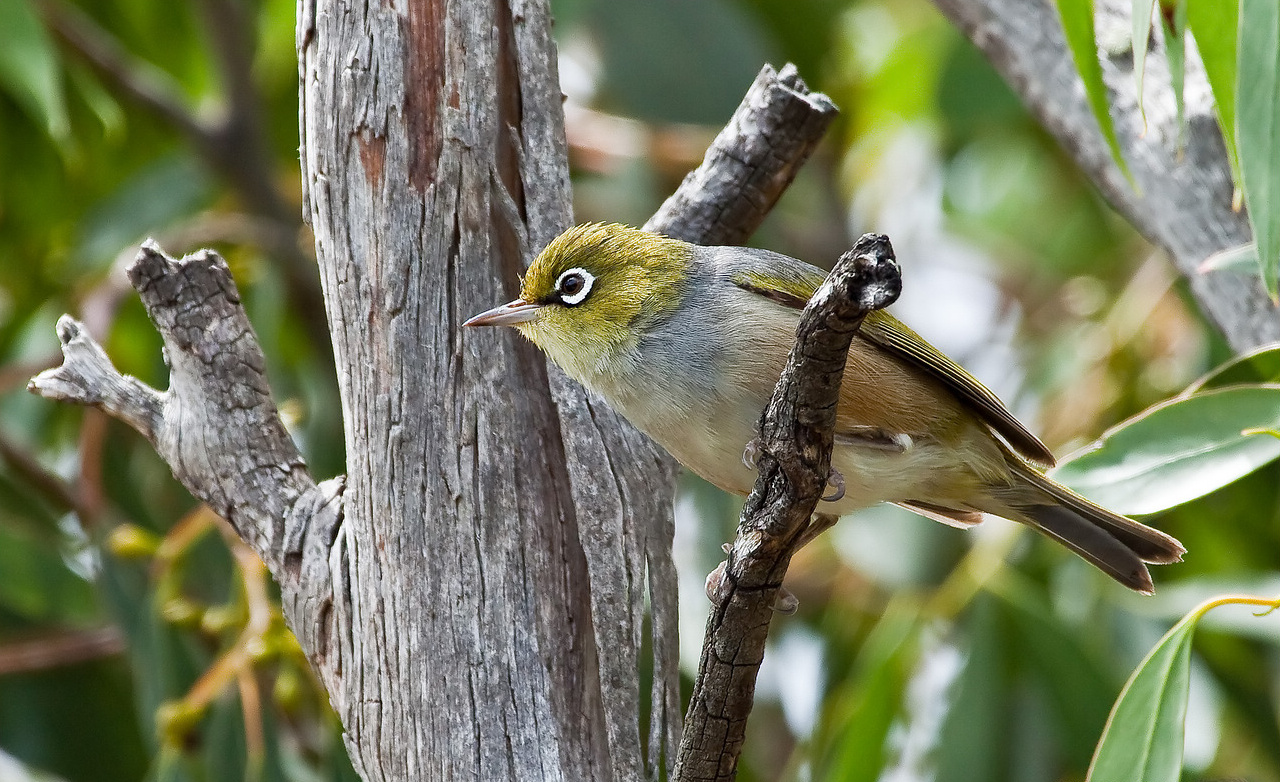
Silvereye

Order: Passeriformes Family: Zosteropidae

The white-eyes are a large family of mostly Old World passerine birds. They are rather diverse in size and colouration, but are characterised by soft fluffy plumage. These are birds of tropical areas, with the greatest variety in Southeast Asia. One species reaches Tasmania.

- Silvereye, Zosterops lateralis

== Starlings ==
Order: Passeriformes Family: Sturnidae

Starlings are small- to medium-sized Old World passerine birds with strong feet. Their flight is strong and direct and most are gregarious. Their preferred habitat is fairly open country, and they eat insects and fruit. The plumage of several species is dark with a metallic sheen.

- European starling, Sturnus vulgaris (I)
- Common myna, Acridotheres tristis (I)

== Thrushes and allies ==
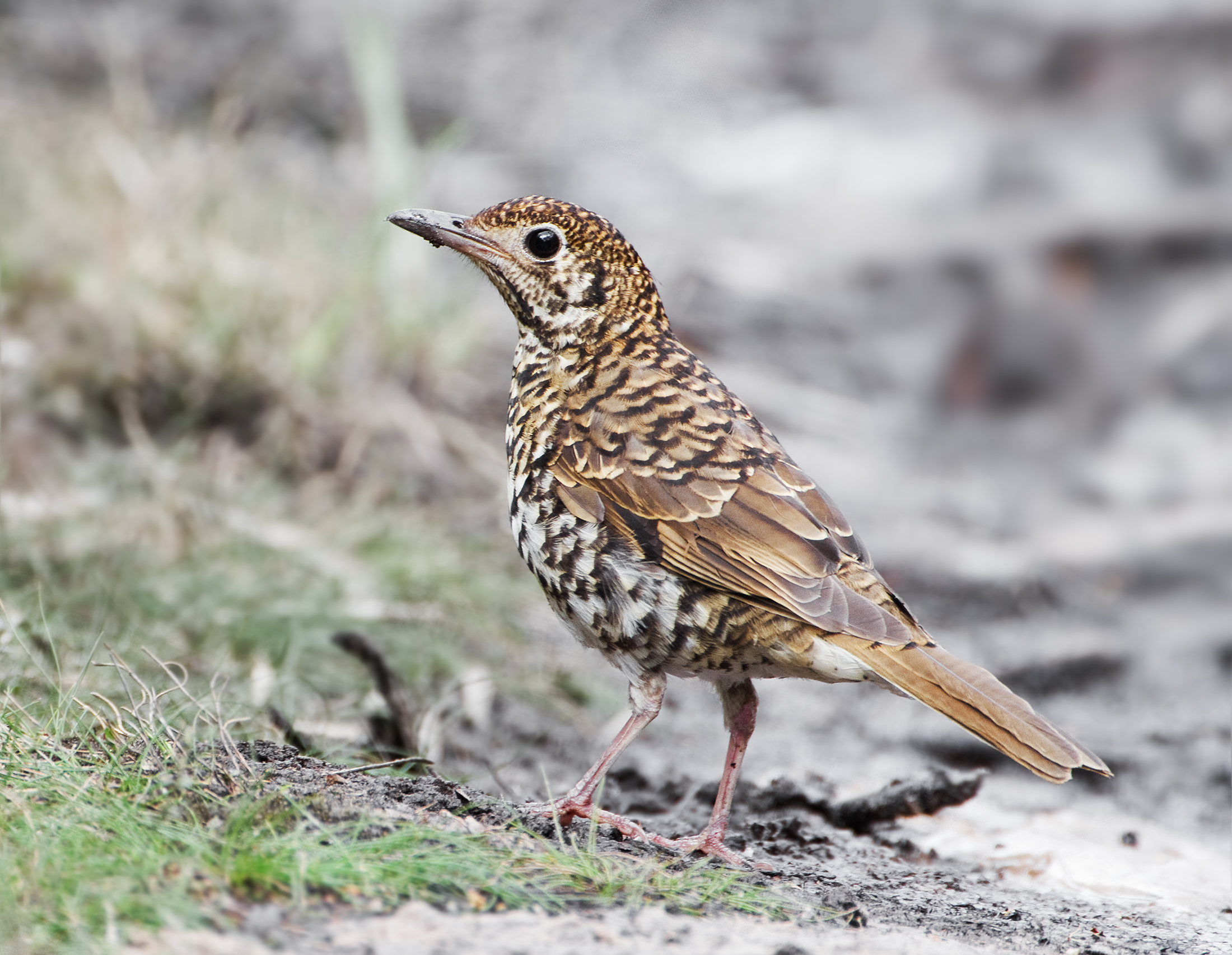
Bassian thrush

Order: Passeriformes Family: Turdidae

The true thrushes are a group of passerine birds that occur mainly but not exclusively in the Old World.

- Bassian thrush, Zoothera lunulata
- Song thrush, Turdus philomelos (I)
- Eurasian blackbird, Turdus merula (I)

== Flowerpeckers ==
Order: Passeriformes Family: Dicaeidae

The flowerpeckers are very small, stout, often brightly coloured birds, with short tails, short thick curved bills, and tubular tongues.

- Mistletoebird, Dicaeum hirundinaceum (V)

== Waxbills and allies ==
Order: Passeriformes Family: Estrildidae

Estrildid finches are small finch- or sparrow-like birds of the Old World tropics and Australasia. One species reach Tasmania.

- Beautiful firetail, Stagonopleura bella
- Red-browed firetail, Neochmia temporalis (V)

== Old World sparrows ==
Order: Passeriformes Family: Passeridae

Old World sparrows are small passerine birds. These sparrows tend to be small plump brownish or greyish birds with short tails and short powerful beaks. Sparrows are seed eaters, but they also consume small insects. One species has been introduced to Tasmania.

- House sparrow, Passer domesticus (I)

== Wagtails and pipits ==
Order: Passeriformes Family: Motacillidae

Motacillidae is a family of small passerine birds with medium to long tails. They include the wagtails, longclaws and pipits. They are slender, ground-feeding insectivores of open country.

- Grey wagtail, Motacilla cinerea (V)
- Australian pipit, Anthus australis

== Finches, euphonias, and allies ==
Order: Passeriformes Family: Fringillidae

Finches are seed-eating passerine birds that are small to moderately large and have a strong beak, usually conical and in some species very large. All have twelve tail feathers and nine primaries. These birds have a bouncing flight with alternating bouts of flapping and gliding on closed wings, and most sing well.

- European greenfinch, Chloris chloris (I)
- Lesser redpoll, Acanthis cabaret (V)
- European goldfinch, Carduelis carduelis (I)

== See also ==
- List of Australian birds
- List of Australian, New Zealand and Antarctic birds
- Birds of Australia
- Lists of birds by region
