= Abbotsfield =

Abbotsfield may refer to:

- Abbotsfield, Tasmania, a suburb in Hobart, Tasmania
- Abbotsfield Secondary School, a school in London, England
- Abbotsfield, Wrexham, building in Wrexham, Wales

== See also ==
- Abbottsfield, Edmonton, a neighbourhood in Edmonton, Canada
