= Abbotsfield, Tasmania =

Abbotsfield
- Suburb
- Interactive map of Abbotsfield
- Coordinates: 42.789°S 147.234°E
- Country: Australia
- State: Tasmania
- City: Hobart
- LGA: City of Glenorchy
Suburbs around Abbotsfield
Granton	River Derwent
Abbotsfield	Austins Ferry
Claremont	Claremont

Abbotsfield is a road within the suburb of Claremont in the northern suburbs of Hobart, capital of Tasmania, Australia. It is in the local government area of Glenorchy. The area is situated slightly to the west of Austins Ferry. The road is split in two (north/south) by the Brooker Highway, and is most obvious when travelling along Abbotsfield Road.

== Amenities ==
- Abbotsfield Primary School
- BP Service Station
