= Austins Ferry =

- Suburb
- Interactive map of Austins Ferry
- Coordinates: 42°45′59″S 147°14′36″E
- Country: Australia
- State: Tasmania
- Region: Hobart
- City: Hobart
- LGA: City of Glenorchy
- Location: 9 km (5.6 mi) N of Glenorchy

Government
  - State electorate: Clark
  - Federal division: Clark

Area
  - Total: 2.1 km^{2} (0.81 sq mi)

Population
  - Total: 2,395 (2021 census)
  - Density: 1,057/km^{2} (2,740/sq mi)
- Postcode: 7011
Suburbs around Austins Ferry
Granton	River Derwent	River Derwent
Abbotsfield	Austins Ferry	River Derwent
Claremont	Claremont	River Derwent

Austins Ferry is a residential suburb of the local government area (LGA) of Glenorchy in the greater Hobart region of Tasmania. It is a suburb of Hobart.

== Geography ==
Austins Ferry is about 9 kilometres (5.6 mi) north of the centre of the City of Glenorchy.

The waters of the River Derwent form the eastern boundary and parts of the northern and southern boundaries of the suburb.

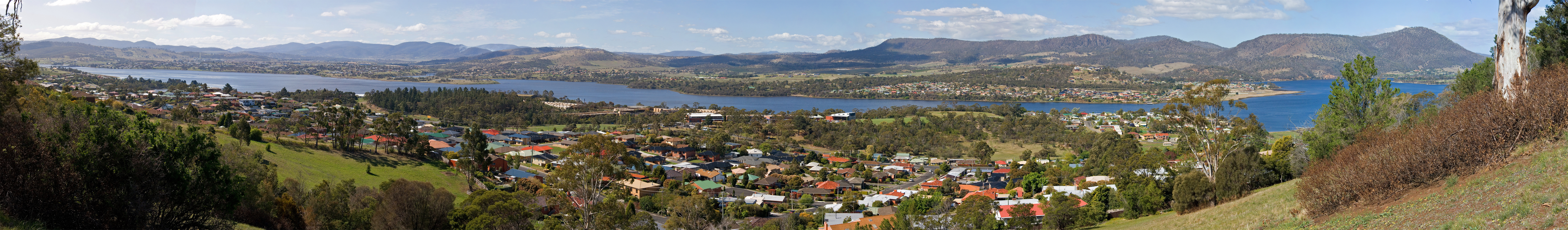
Panorama of the upper half of Austins Ferry

== History ==
Austins Ferry is named after James Austin (1776–1831), who had been transported to Port Phillip as a convict in 1803 along with his cousin John Earl, and who was subsequently sent to Van Diemens Land in 1804.

After their sentences expired, the two men were granted small land parcels on the western shore of the River Derwent between Hobart and New Norfolk. In 1818 they established a ferry service across the river and later a punt which proved very conveniently-located for vehicular traffic travelling between Hobart and regions to the north, and they thus became very wealthy.

In 1821 the visiting Governor Lachlan Macquarie renamed the village Roseneath, but it later reverted to its original name.

Austins Ferry was gazetted as a locality in 1960.

The 2021 census recorded a population of 2,395 for Austins Ferry.

== Facilities and attractions ==
=== James Austin's cottage ===
James Austin's original cottage (picture on the right) is preserved as a tourist attraction.

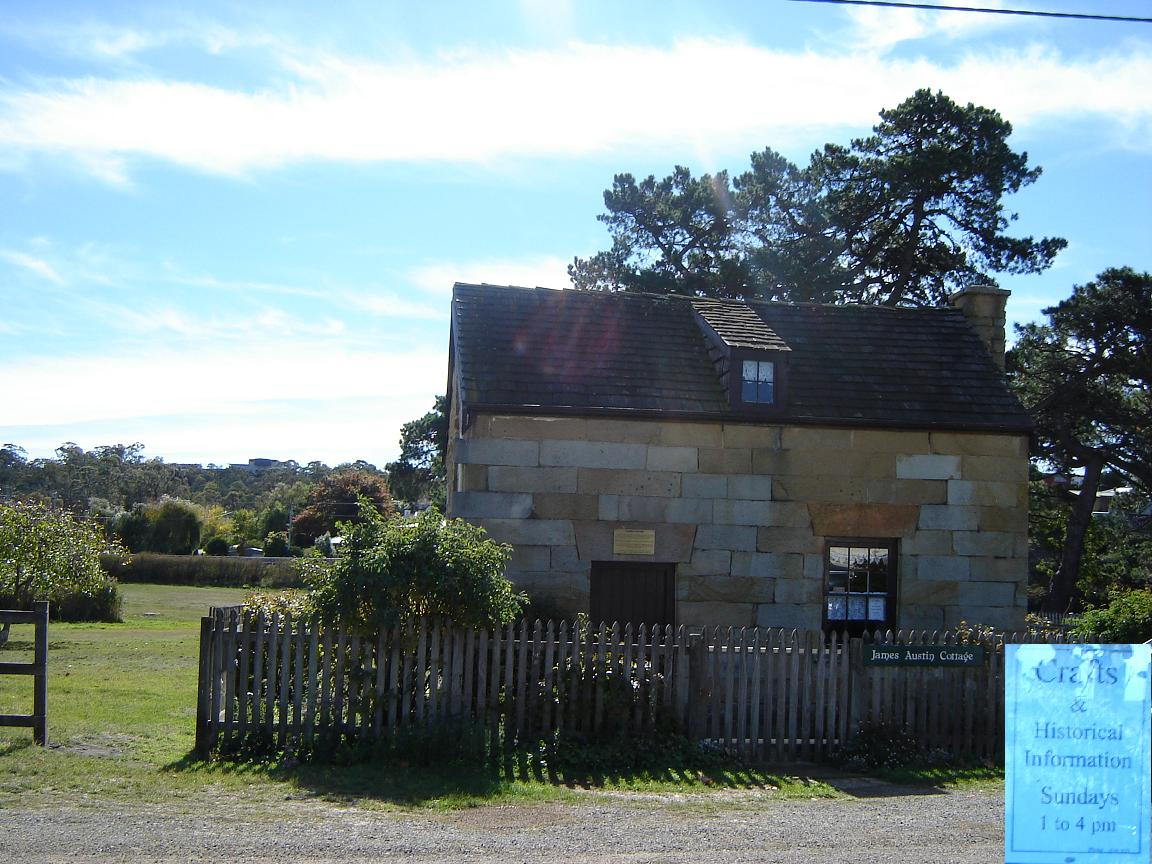
James Austin Cottage

The opening hours for the cottage are limited to Sundays between 1 p.m. and 4 p.m. It provides crafts and historical information.

=== Saint Virgil's College ===
Austins Ferry is the location of St Virgil's College, a private Roman Catholic co-educational school.

=== Austins Ferry Primary School ===
Austins Ferry Primary School is the local state school. It was established in 2011.

== Road infrastructure ==
National Route 1 (Brooker Highway) passes to the west of Austins Ferry. From there, several roads provide access to the locality.
