= List of birds of Australia, New Zealand and Antarctica =

This list is based on the Handbook of Australian, New Zealand and Antarctic Birds list, May 2002 update, with the doubtfuls omitted. It includes the birds of Australia, New Zealand, Antarctica, and the surrounding ocean and subantarctic islands.

- Australian call-ups are based on the List of Australian birds.
- New Zealand call-ups are based on the List of New Zealand birds.

== Struthioniiformes ==
=== Casuariidae ===
- Emu, Dromaius novaehollandiae - Aus
- Southern cassowary, Casuarius casuarius - Aus

=== Apterygidae ===
- Brown kiwi, Apteryx australis - NZ
- Little spotted kiwi, Apteryx owenii - NZ
- Great spotted kiwi, Apteryx haastii - NZ

== Podicipediformes ==
=== Podicipedidae ===
- Australasian grebe, Tachybaptus novaehollandiae - Aus, NZ
- Hoary-headed grebe, Poliocephalus poliocephalus - Aus, NZ
- New Zealand dabchick, Poliocephalus rufopectus - NZ
- Great crested grebe, Podiceps cristatus - Aus, NZ

== Sphenisciformes ==
=== Spheniscidae ===
- King penguin, Aptenodytes patagonicus - Aus, NZ
- Emperor penguin, Aptenodytes forsteri - Aus, NZ
- Gentoo penguin, Pygoscelis papua - Aus, NZ
- Adelie penguin, Pygoscelis adeliae - Aus, NZ
- Chinstrap penguin, Pygoscelis antarctica - Aus, NZ
- Southern rockhopper penguin, Eudyptes chrysocome - Aus, NZ
- Northern rockhopper penguin, Eudyptes moseleyi - NZ
- Fiordland penguin, Eudyptes pachyrhynchus - Aus, NZ
- Snares penguin, Eudyptes robustus - Aus, NZ
- Erect-crested penguin, Eudyptes sclateri - Aus, NZ
- Macaroni penguin, Eudyptes chrysolophus - Aus, NZ
- Yellow-eyed penguin, Megadyptes antipodes - NZ
- Little penguin, Eudyptula minor - Aus, NZ
- Magellanic penguin, Spheniscus magellanicus - Aus, NZ

== Procellariiformes ==
=== Diomedeidae ===
- Wandering albatross, Diomedea exulans - NZ
- Royal albatross, Diomedea epomophora - NZ
- Black-footed albatross, Phoebastria nigripes - NZ
- Black-browed albatross, Thalassarche melanophris - Aus, NZ
- Shy albatross, Thalassarche cauta - NZ
- Salvin's albatross, Thalassarche salvini - Aus, NZ
- Grey-headed albatross, Thalassarche chrysostoma - Aus, NZ
- Indian yellow-nosed albatross, Thalassarche carteri - Aus, NZ
- Buller's albatross, Thalassarche bulleri - NZ
- Sooty albatross, Phoebetria fusca - NZ
- Light-mantled sooty albatross, Phoebetria palpebrata - NZ

=== Procellariidae ===
- Southern giant petrel, Macronectes giganteus - NZ
- Northern giant petrel, Macronectes halli - NZ
- Southern fulmar, Fulmarus glacialoides - Aus, NZ
- Antarctic petrel, Thalassoica antarctica - NZ
- Cape petrel, Daption capense - Aus, NZ
- Snow petrel, Pagodroma nivea - NZ
- Kerguelen petrel, Lugensa brevirostris - Aus, NZ
- Tahiti petrel, Pseudobulweria rostrata - Aus, NZ
- Great-winged petrel, Pterodroma macroptera - NZ
- White-headed petrel, Pterodroma lessonii - NZ
- Providence petrel, Pterodroma solandri - Aus
- Magenta petrel, Pterodroma magentae
- Kermadec petrel, Pterodroma neglecta - Aus, NZ
- Herald petrel, Pterodroma arminjoniana - Aus
- Phoenix petrel, Pterodroma alba - NZ
- Soft-plumaged petrel, Pterodroma mollis - Aus, NZ
- Mottled petrel, Pterodroma inexpectata - Aus, NZ
- Juan Fernandez petrel, Pterodroma externa - Aus, NZ
- White-necked petrel, Pterodroma cervicalis - Aus, NZ
- Barau's petrel, Pterodroma baraui - Aus
- Black-winged petrel, Pterodroma nigripennis - Aus, NZ
- Chatham petrel, Pterodroma axillaris - NZ
- Cook's petrel, Pterodroma cookii - NZ
- Stejneger's petrel, Pterodroma longirostris - NZ
- Pycroft's petrel, Pterodroma pycrofti - NZ
- Gould's petrel, Pterodroma leucoptera - Aus, NZ
- Blue petrel, Halobaena caerulea - Aus, NZ
- Broad-billed prion, Pachyptila vittata - Aus, NZ
- Salvin's prion, Pachyptila salvini - Aus, NZ
- Antarctic prion, Pachyptila desolata - Aus, NZ
- Slender-billed prion, Pachyptila belcheri - Aus, NZ
- Fairy prion, Pachyptila turtur - Aus, NZ
- Fulmar prion, Pachyptila crassirostris - Aus, NZ
- Bulwer's petrel, Bulweria bulwerii
- White-chinned petrel, Procellaria aequinoctialis - Aus, NZ
- Westland petrel, Procellaria westlandica - NZ
- Black petrel, Procellaria parkinsoni - NZ
- Grey petrel, Procellaria cinerea - Aus, NZ
- Cory's shearwater, Calonectris borealis - NZ
- Streaked shearwater, Calonectris leucomelas - Aus, NZ
- Wedge-tailed shearwater, Ardenna pacificus - Aus, NZ
- Buller's shearwater, Ardenna bulleri - NZ
- Flesh-footed shearwater, Ardenna carneipes - Aus, NZ
- Pink-footed shearwater, Ardenna creatopus - Aus, NZ
- Great shearwater, Ardenna gravis - Aus, NZ
- Sooty shearwater, Ardenna griseus - Aus, NZ
- Short-tailed shearwater, Ardenna tenuirostris - Aus, NZ
- Christmas shearwater, Puffinus nativitatis - NZ
- Manx shearwater, Puffinus puffinus - Aus, NZ
- Fluttering shearwater, Puffinus gavia - NZ
- Hutton's shearwater, Puffinus huttoni - NZ
- Little shearwater, Puffinus assimilis - Aus, NZ

=== Procellariidae ===
- South Georgian diving petrel, Pelecanoides georgicus - Aus, NZ
- Common diving petrel, Pelecanoides urinatrix - Aus, NZ

=== Hydrobatidae ===
- Wilson's storm petrel, Oceanites oceanicus - Aus, NZ
- Grey-backed storm petrel, Garrodia nereis - Aus, NZ
- White-faced storm petrel, Pelagodroma marina - Aus, NZ
- Kermadec storm petrel, Pelagodroma marina - NZ
- New Zealand storm petrel, Fregetta maoriana - NZ
- Black-bellied storm petrel, Fregetta tropica - Aus, NZ
- White-bellied storm petrel, Fregetta grallaria - Aus, NZ
- Leach's storm petrel, Oceanodroma leucorhoa - Aus, NZ
- Matsudaira's storm petrel, Oceanodroma matsudairae - Aus

== Suliformes ==
=== Sulidae ===
- Cape gannet, Morus capensis - Aus, NZ
- Australasian gannet, Morus serrator - Aus, NZ
- Masked booby, Sula dactylatra - Aus, NZ
- Red-footed booby, Sula sula - Aus, NZ
- Brown booby, Sula leucogaster - Aus, NZ
- Abbott's booby, Papasula abbotti - Aus, NZ

=== Anhingidae ===
- Australasian darter, Anhinga novaehollandiae - Aus, NZ

=== Phalacrocoracidae ===
- Little pied cormorant, Microcarbo melanoleucos - Aus, NZ
- Great cormorant, Phalacrocorax carbo - Aus, NZ
- Pied cormorant, Phalacrocorax varius - Aus, NZ
- Little black cormorant, Phalacrocorax sulcirostris - Aus, NZ
- Black-faced cormorant, Phalacrocorax fuscescens - Aus
- Spotted shag, Phalacrocorax punctatus - NZ
- Pitt shag, Phalacrocorax featherstoni - NZ
- King shag, Phalacrocorax carunculatus - NZ
- Otago shag, Phalacrocorax chalconotus - NZ
- Foveaux shag, Phalacrocorax stewarti - NZ
- Chatham shag, Phalacrocorax onslowi - NZ
- Auckland shag, Phalacrocorax colensoi - NZ
- Campbell shag, Phalacrocorax campbelli - NZ
- Bounty shag, Phalacrocorax ranfurlyi - NZ
- Macquarie shag, Phalacrocorax purpurascens - Aus
- Heard Island shag, Phalacrocorax nivalis - Aus
- Kerguelen shag, Leucocarbo verrucosus - NZ

=== Fregatidae ===
- Great frigatebird, Fregata minor - Aus, NZ
- Lesser frigatebird, Fregata ariel - Aus, NZ
- Christmas frigatebird, Fregata andrewsi - Aus, NZ

== Phaethontiformes ==
=== Phaethontidae ===
- Red-tailed tropicbird, Phaethon rubricauda - Aus, NZ
- White-tailed tropicbird, Phaethon lepturus - Aus, NZ

== Pelecaniformes ==
=== Pelecanidae ===
- Australian pelican, Pelecanus conspicillatus - Aus, NZ

=== Ardeidae ===
- White-necked heron, Ardea pacifica - Aus, NZ
- Great-billed heron, Ardea sumatrana - Aus, NZ
- Eastern great egret, Ardea modesta - Aus, NZ
- Pied heron, Ardea picata - Aus
- Intermediate egret, Ardea intermedia - Aus, NZ
- Swinhoe's egret, Egretta eulophotes
- Cattle egret, Ardea ibis - Aus, NZ
- White-faced heron, Egretta novaehollandiae - Aus, NZ
- Little egret, Egretta garzetta - Aus, NZ
- Eastern reef egret, Egretta sacra - Aus, NZ
- Striated heron, Butorides striatus - Aus
- Black-crowned night heron, Nycticorax nycticorax - Aus
- Nankeen night heron, Nycticorax caledonicus - Aus, NZ
- Malayan night heron, Gorsachius melanolophus - Aus
- Australian little bittern, Ixobrychus dubius - Aus, NZ
- New Zealand little bittern, Ixobrychus novaezelandiae - NZ, extinct
- Yellow bittern, Ixobrychus sinensis - Aus
- Black bittern, Ixobrychus flavicollis - Aus
- Australasian bittern, Botaurus poiciloptilus - Aus, NZ

=== Threskiornithidae ===
- Glossy ibis, Plegadis falcinellus - Aus, NZ
- Australian white ibis, Threskiornis moluccus - Aus, NZ
- Straw-necked ibis, Threskiornis spinicollis - Aus, NZ
- Royal spoonbill, Platalea regia - Aus, NZ
- Yellow-billed spoonbill, Platalea flavipes - Aus, NZ

== Ciconiiformes ==
=== Ciconiidae ===
- White stork, Ciconia ciconia - NZ
- Black-necked stork, Ephippiorhynchus asiaticus - Aus

== Phoenicopteriformes ==
=== Phoenicopteridae ===
- Greater flamingo, Phoenicopterus ruber - Aus, rare vagrant

== Anseriformes ==
=== Anseranatidae ===
- Magpie goose, Anseranas semipalmata - Aus

=== Anatidae ===
- Plumed whistling duck, Dendrocygna eytoni - Aus, NZ
- Wandering whistling duck, Dendrocygna arcuata - Aus
- Argentine ruddy duck, Oxyura vittata
- Blue-billed duck, Oxyura australis - Aus, NZ
- Musk duck, Biziura lobata - Aus
- Freckled duck, Stictonetta naevosa - Aus
- Mute swan, Cygnus olor - Aus, NZ
- Black swan, Cygnus atratus - Aus, NZ
- Canada goose, Branta canadensis - Aus, NZ
- Cape Barren goose, Cereopsis novaehollandiae - Aus, NZ
- Paradise shelduck, Tadorna variegata - NZ
- Australian shelduck, Tadorna tadornoides - Aus, NZ
- Radjah shelduck, Tadorna radjah - Aus
- Green pygmy goose, Nettapus pulchellus - Aus
- Cotton pygmy goose, Nettapus coromandelianus - Aus
- Australian wood duck, Chenonetta jubata - Aus
- Pink-eared duck, Malacorhynchus membranaceus - Aus, NZ
- Blue duck, Hymenolaimus malacorhynchus - NZ
- Chiloe widgeon, Anas sibilatrix - NZ
- Chilean teal, Anas flavirostris
- Grey teal, Anas gibberifrons - Aus, NZ
- Chestnut teal, Anas castanea - Aus
- Brown teal, Anas chlorotis - NZ
- Auckland teal, Anas aucklandica - NZ
- Campbell teal, Anas nesiotis - NZ
- Northern pintail, Anas acuta - Aus, NZ
- Brown pintail, Anas georgica
- Eaton's pintail, Anas eatoni
- Mallard, Anas platyrhynchos - Aus
- Pacific black duck, Anas superciliosa - Aus, NZ
- Garganey, Anas querquedula - Aus
- Blue-winged teal, Anas discors
- Australasian shoveller, Anas rhynchotis - Aus
- Northern shoveller, Anas clypeata - Aus
- Hardhead, Aythya australis - Aus, NZ
- New Zealand scaup, Aythya novaeseelandiae - NZ
- New Zealand merganser, Mergus australis - NZ

== Accipitriformes ==
=== Accipitridae ===
- Pacific baza, Aviceda subcristata - Aus, NZ
- Black-shouldered kite, Elanus axillaris - Aus
- Letter-winged kite, Elanus scriptus - Aus
- Black kite, Milvus migrans - Aus, NZ
- Brahminy kite, Haliastur indus - Aus
- Whistling kite, Haliastur sphenurus - Aus
- White-bellied sea eagle, Haliaeetus leucogaster - Aus, NZ
- Spotted harrier, Circus assimilis - Aus, NZ
- Swamp harrier, Circus approximans - Aus, NZ
- Grey goshawk, Accipiter novaehollandiae - Aus
- Brown goshawk, Accipiter fasciatus - Aus
- Collared sparrowhawk, Accipiter cirrocephalus - Aus, NZ
- Gurney's eagle, Aquila gurneyi - Aus
- Wedge-tailed eagle, Aquila audax - Aus, NZ
- Little eagle, Hieraaetus morphnoides - Aus
- Black-breasted buzzard, Hamirostra melanosternon - Aus, NZ
- Square-tailed kite, Lophoictinia isura - Aus
- Red goshawk, Erythrotriorchis radiatus - Aus

=== Pandionidae ===
- Osprey, Pandion haliaetus - Aus, NZ

== Falconiformes ==
=== Falconidae ===
- Brown falcon, Falco berigora - Aus, NZ
- Nankeen kestrel, Falco cenchroides - Aus, NZ
- Australian hobby, Falco longipennis - Aus, NZ
- New Zealand falcon, Falco novaeseelandiae - NZ
- Grey falcon, Falco hypoleucos - Aus
- Black falcon, Falco subniger - Aus, NZ
- Peregrine falcon, Falco peregrinus - Aus, NZ

== Galliformes ==
=== Megapodiidae ===
- Orange-footed scrubfowl, Megapodius reinwardt - Aus
- Malleefowl, Leipoa ocellata - Aus
- Australian brush-turkey, Alectura lathami - Aus

=== Phasianidae ===
- Wild turkey, Meleagris gallopavo - Aus, NZ, introduced

=== Odontophoridae ===
- California quail, Callipepla californica - Aus, introduced

=== Phasianidae ===
- Red junglefowl, Gallus gallus - Aus, introduced
- Indian peafowl, Pavo cristatus - Aus, NZ, introduced
- Common pheasant, Phasianus colchicus - Aus, NZ, introduced
- Chukar, Alectoris chukar - NZ, introduced
- Stubble quail, Coturnix pectoralis - Aus
- New Zealand quail, Coturnix novaezelandiae - NZ, extinct
- Brown quail, Coturnix ypsilophora - Aus, NZ
- King quail, Coturnix chinensis - Aus

== Gruiformes ==
=== Gruidae ===
- Sarus crane, Grus antigone - Aus
- Brolga, Grus rubicunda - Aus

=== Rallidae ===
- Red-necked crake, Rallina tricolor - Aus
- Red-legged crake, Rallina fasciata - Aus
- Buff-banded rail, Gallirallus philippensis - Aus
- Weka, Gallirallus australis - NZ
- Lord Howe woodhen, Gallirallus sylvestris - Aus
- Chatham Island rail, Gallirallus modestus - NZ, extinct
- Lewin's rail, Rallus pectoralis - Aus
- Plain bush-hen, Amaurornis olivaceus - Aus
- Baillon's crake, Porzana pusilla - Aus
- Australian spotted crake, Porzana fluminea - Aus
- Ruddy-breasted crake, Porzana fusca - Aus
- Spotless crake, Porzana tabuensis - Aus
- White-browed crake, Porzana cinerea - Aus
- Chestnut rail, Eulabeornis castaneoventris - Aus
- Watercock, Gallicrex cinerea - Aus
- Purple gallinule, Porphyrio martinicus
- Australasian swamphen, Porphyrio melanotus - Aus, NZ
- Takahē, Porphyrio mantelli - NZ
- Dusky moorhen, Gallinula tenebrosa - Aus
- Black-tailed nativehen, Tribonyx ventralis - Aus
- Tasmanian nativehen, Tribonyx mortierii - Aus
- Eurasian coot, Fulica atra - Aus

== Otidiformes ==
=== Otididae ===
- Australian bustard, Ardeotis australis - Aus

== Charadriiformes ==
=== Turnicidae ===
- Red-backed buttonquail, Turnix maculosa - Aus
- Painted buttonquail, Turnix varius - Aus
- Chestnut-backed buttonquail, Turnix castanota - Aus
- Buff-breasted buttonquail, Turnix olivii - Aus
- Black-breasted buttonquail, Turnix melanogaster - Aus
- Little buttonquail, Turnix velox - Aus
- Red-chested buttonquail, Turnix pyrrhothorax - Aus

=== Pedionomidae ===
- Plains-wanderer, Pedionomus torquatus - Aus

=== Rostratulidae ===
- Australian painted-snipe, Rostratula australis - Aus

=== Jacanidae ===
- Comb-crested jacana, Irediparra gallinacea - Aus
- Pheasant-tailed jacana, Hydrophasianus chirurgus - Aus

=== Chionididae ===
- Pale-faced sheathbill, Chionis alba
- Black-faced sheathbill, Chionis minor - Aus

=== Burhinidae ===
- Bush stone-curlew, Burhinus grallarius - Aus
- Beach stone-curlew, Esacus magnirostris - Aus

=== Haematopodidae ===
- Pied oystercatcher, Haematopus longirostris - Aus
- South Island pied oystercatcher, Haematopus finschi - Aus, NZ
- Chatham Island oystercatcher, Haematopus chathamensis - NZ
- Sooty oystercatcher, Haematopus fuliginosus - Aus
- Variable oystercatcher, Haematopus unicolor - NZ

=== Recurvirostridae ===
- Black-winged stilt, Himantopus himantopus - Aus
- Black stilt, Himantopus novaezelandiae - NZ
- Banded stilt, Cladorhynchus leucocephalus - Aus
- Red-necked avocet, Recurvirostra novaehollandiae - Aus

=== Charadriidae ===
- Pacific golden plover, Pluvialis fulva - Aus
- American golden plover, Pluvialis dominica
- Grey plover, Pluvialis squatarola - Aus
- New Zealand dotterel, Charadrius obscurus - NZ
- Ringed plover, Charadrius hiaticula - Aus
- Little ringed plover, Charadrius dubius - Aus
- Kentish plover, Charadrius alexandrinus - Aus
- Red-capped plover, Charadrius ruficapillus - Aus
- Double-banded plover, Charadrius bicinctus - Aus
- Lesser sand plover, Charadrius mongolus - Aus
- Greater sand plover, Charadrius leschenaultii - Aus
- Caspian plover, Charadrius asiaticus - Aus
- Oriental plover, Charadrius veredus - Aus
- Inland dotterel, Charadrius australis - Aus
- Three-banded plover, Charadrius tricollaris
- Black-fronted dotterel, Elseyornis melanops - Aus
- Hooded plover, Thinornis cucullatus - Aus
- Shore plover, Thinornis novaeseelandiae - NZ
- Wrybill, Anarhynchus frontalis - NZ
- Red-kneed dotterel, Erythrogonys cinctus - Aus
- Banded lapwing, Vanellus tricolor - Aus
- Masked lapwing, Vanellus miles - Aus
- Northern lapwing, Vanellus vanellus
- Blacksmith lapwing, Vanellus armatus

=== Scolopacidae ===
- Latham's snipe, Gallinago hardwickii - Aus
- Pin-tailed snipe, Gallinago stenura - Aus
- Swinhoe's snipe, Gallinago megala - Aus
- Chatham Island snipe, Coenocorypha pusilla - NZ
- Subantarctic snipe, Coenocorypha aucklandica - NZ
- Snares snipe, Coenocorypha huegeli - NZ
- Black-tailed godwit, Limosa limosa - Aus
- Hudsonian godwit, Limosa haemastica - Aus
- Bar-tailed godwit, Limosa lapponica - Aus
- Little curlew, Numenius minutus - Aus
- Whimbrel, Numenius phaeopus - Aus
- Bristle-thighed curlew, Numenius tahitiensis
- Eastern curlew, Numenius madagascariensis - Aus
- Upland sandpiper, Bartramia longicauda - Aus
- Spotted redshank, Tringa erythropus - Aus
- Common redshank, Tringa totanus - Aus
- Marsh sandpiper, Tringa stagnatilis - Aus
- Common greenshank, Tringa nebularia - Aus
- Lesser yellowlegs, Tringa flavipes - Aus
- Solitary sandpiper, Tringa solitaria
- Green sandpiper, Tringa ochropus - Aus
- Wood sandpiper, Tringa glareola - Aus
- Terek sandpiper, Xenus cinereus - Aus
- Common sandpiper, Actitis hypoleucos - Aus
- Grey-tailed tattler, Tringa brevipes - Aus
- Wandering tattler, Tringa incana - Aus
- Ruddy turnstone, Arenaria interpres - Aus
- Asian dowitcher, Limnodromus semipalmatus - Aus
- Great knot, Calidris tenuirostris - Aus
- Red knot, Calidris canutus - Aus, NZ
- Sanderling, Calidris alba - Aus
- Western sandpiper, Calidris mauri
- Little stint, Calidris minuta - Aus
- Red-necked stint, Calidris ruficollis - Aus
- Long-toed stint, Calidris subminuta - Aus
- Least sandpiper, Calidris minutilla
- White-rumped sandpiper, Calidris fuscicollis - Aus
- Baird's sandpiper, Calidris bairdii - Aus
- Pectoral sandpiper, Calidris melanotos - Aus
- Sharp-tailed sandpiper, Calidris acuminata - Aus
- Dunlin, Calidris alpina - Aus
- Curlew sandpiper, Calidris ferruginea - Aus
- Stilt sandpiper, Micropalama himantopus - Aus
- Buff-breasted sandpiper, Tryngites subruficollis - Aus
- Broad-billed sandpiper, Limicola falcinellus - Aus
- Ruff, Philomachus pugnax - Aus
- Wilson's phalarope, Phalaropus tricolor - Aus
- Red-necked phalarope, Phalaropus lobatus - Aus
- Grey phalarope, Phalaropus fulicarius - Aus

=== Glareolidae ===
- Oriental pratincole, Glareola maldivarum - Aus
- Australian pratincole, Stiltia isabella - Aus

=== Laridae ===
- Great skua, Catharacta skua
- South polar skua, Catharacta maccormicki - Aus
- Pomarine jaeger, Stercorarius pomarinus - Aus
- Arctic jaeger, Stercorarius parasiticus - Aus, NZ
- Long-tailed jaeger, Stercorarius longicauda - Aus
- Pacific gull, Larus pacificus - Aus
- Black-tailed gull, Larus crassirostris - Aus
- Kelp gull, Larus dominicanus - Aus, NZ
- Silver gull, Chroicocephalus novaehollandiae - Aus, NZ
- Black-billed gull, Chroicocephalus bulleri - NZ
- Black-headed gull, Chroicocephalus ridibundus - Aus
- Laughing gull, Leucophaeus atricilla - Aus
- Franklin's gull, Leucophaeus pipixcan - Aus
- Sabine's gull, Xema sabini - Aus
- Gull-billed tern, Gelochelidon nilotica - Aus
- Australian tern, Gelochelidon macrotarsa - Aus
- Caspian tern, Hydroprogne caspia - Aus, NZ
- Lesser crested tern, Thalasseus bengalensis - Aus
- Greater crested tern, Thalasseus bergii - Aus
- Roseate tern, Sterna dougallii - Aus
- White-fronted tern, Sterna striata - Aus
- Black-naped tern, Sterna sumatrana - Aus
- Common tern, Sterna hirundo - Aus
- Arctic tern, Sterna paradisaea - Aus
- Antarctic tern, Sterna vittata - Aus
- Kerguelen tern, Sterna virgata
- Little tern, Sternula albifrons - Aus
- Fairy tern, Sternula nereis - Aus
- Bridled tern, Onychoprion anaethetus - Aus
- Sooty tern, Onychoprion fuscatus - Aus
- Black-fronted tern, Chlidonias albostriatus - NZ
- Whiskered tern, Chlidonias hybrida - Aus
- White-winged tern, Chlidonias leucopterus - Aus
- Black tern, Chlidonias niger - Aus
- Common noddy, Anous stolidus - Aus
- Black noddy, Anous minutus - Aus
- Lesser noddy, Anous tenuirostris - Aus
- Grey ternlet, Procelsterna cerulea - Aus
- White tern, Gygis alba - Aus

== Columbiformes ==
=== Columbidae ===
- Rock dove, Columba livia - Aus, NZ, introduced
- White-throated pigeon, Columba vitiensis - Aus
- White-headed pigeon, Columba leucomela - Aus
- Laughing dove, Spilopelia senegalensis - Aus, introduced
- Spotted dove, Spilopelia chinensis - Aus, NZ, introduced
- Barbary dove, Streptopelia risoria - Aus, NZ, introduced
- Brown cuckoo-dove, Macropygia phasianella - Aus
- Pacific emerald dove, Chalcophaps longirostris - Aus
- Common bronzewing, Phaps chalcoptera - Aus
- Brush bronzewing, Phaps elegans - Aus
- Flock bronzewing, Phaps histrionica - Aus
- Crested pigeon, Ocyphaps lophotes - Aus
- Spinifex pigeon, Geophaps plumifera - Aus
- Partridge pigeon, Geophaps smithii - Aus
- Squatter pigeon, Geophaps scripta - Aus
- White-quilled rock pigeon, Petrophassa albipennis - Aus
- Chestnut-quilled rock pigeon, Petrophassa rufipennis - Aus
- Diamond dove, Geopelia cuneata - Aus
- Peaceful dove, Geopelia striata - Aus
- Bar-shouldered dove, Geopelia humeralis - Aus
- Wonga pigeon, Leucosarcia melanoleuca - Aus
- Norfolk ground dove, Gallicolumba norfolciensis - Aus, extinct
- Black-banded fruit dove, Ptilinopus alligator - Aus
- Wompoo fruit dove, Ptilinopus magnificus - Aus
- Superb fruit dove, Ptilinopus superbus - Aus
- Rose-crowned fruit dove, Ptilinopus regina - Aus
- Elegant imperial pigeon, Ducula concinna - Aus
- Christmas imperial pigeon, Ducula whartoni - Aus
- Collared imperial pigeon, Ducula mullerii - Aus
- Torresian imperial pigeon, Ducula spilorrhoa - Aus
- Topknot pigeon, Lopholaimus antarcticus - Aus
- New Zealand pigeon, Hemiphaga novaeseelandiae - Aus, NZ

== Psittaciformes ==
=== Strigopidae ===
- Kea, Nestor notabilis - NZ
- New Zealand kākā, Nestor meridionalis - NZ
- Norfolk kākā, Nestor productus - Aus
- Kākāpō, Strigops habroptilus - NZ

=== Cacatuidae ===
- Palm cockatoo, Probosciger aterrimus - Aus
- Red-tailed black cockatoo, Calyptorhynchus banksii - Aus
- Glossy black cockatoo, Calyptorhynchus lathami - Aus
- Yellow-tailed black cockatoo, Calyptorhynchus funereus - Aus
- Short-billed black cockatoo, Calyptorhynchus latirostris - Aus
- Long-billed black cockatoo, Calyptorhynchus baudinii - Aus
- Gang-gang cockatoo, Callocephalon fimbriatum - Aus
- Galah, Eolophus roseicapilla - Aus
- Major Mitchell's cockatoo, Lophochroa leadbeateri - Aus
- Long-billed corella, Cacatua tenuirostris - Aus
- Western corella, Cacatua pastinator - Aus
- Little corella, Cacatua sanguinea - Aus
- Sulphur-crested cockatoo, Cacatua galerita - Aus, NZ
- Cockatiel, Nymphicus hollandicus - Aus

=== Psittacidae ===
- Rainbow lorikeet, Trichoglossus haematodus - Aus
- Scaly-breasted lorikeet, Trichoglossus chlorolepidotus - Aus
- Varied lorikeet, Psitteuteles versicolor - Aus
- Musk lorikeet, Glossopsitta concinna - Aus
- Little lorikeet, Glossopsitta pusilla - Aus
- Purple-crowned lorikeet, Glossopsitta porphyrocephala - Aus
- Eclectus parrot, Eclectus roratus - Aus
- Red-cheeked parrot, Geoffroyus geoffroyi - Aus
- Double-eyed fig parrot, Cyclopsitta diophthalma - Aus
- Australian king parrot, Alisterus scapularis - Aus
- Red-winged parrot, Aprosmictus erythropterus - Aus
- Superb parrot, Polytelis swainsonii - Aus
- Regent parrot, Polytelis anthopeplus - Aus
- Princess parrot, Polytelis alexandrae - Aus
- Green rosella, Platycercus caledonicus - Aus
- Crimson rosella, Platycercus elegans - Aus
- Eastern rosella, Platycercus eximius - Aus
- Pale-headed rosella, Platycercus adscitus - Aus
- Northern rosella, Platycercus venustus - Aus
- Western rosella, Platycercus icterotis - Aus
- Australian ringneck, Barnardius zonarius - Aus
- Red-capped parrot, Purpureicephalus spurius - Aus
- Blue bonnet, Northiella haematogaster - Aus
- Swift parrot, Lathamus discolor - Aus
- Red-rumped parrot, Psephotus haematonotus - Aus
- Mulga parrot, Psephotus varius - Aus
- Golden-shouldered parrot, Psephotus chrysopterygius - Aus
- Hooded parrot, Psephotus dissimilis - Aus
- Paradise parrot, Psephotus pulcherrimus - Aus
- Antipodes parakeet, Cyanoramphus unicolor - NZ
- Red-fronted parakeet, Cyanoramphus novaezelandiae - Aus, NZ
- Yellow-crowned parakeet, Cyanoramphus auriceps - NZ
- Budgerigar, Melopsittacus undulatus - Aus
- Bourke's parrot, Neophema bourkii - Aus
- Blue-winged parrot, Neophema chrysostoma - Aus
- Elegant parrot, Neophema elegans - Aus
- Rock parrot, Neophema petrophila - Aus
- Orange-bellied parrot, Neophema chrysogaster - Aus
- Turquoise parrot, Neophema pulchella - Aus
- Scarlet-chested parrot, Neophema splendida - Aus
- Eastern ground parrot, Pezoporus wallicus - Aus
- Western ground parrot, Pezoporus flaviventris - Aus
- Night parrot, Pezoporus occidentalis - Aus

== Cuculiformes ==
=== Cuculidae ===
- Common cuckoo, Cuculus canorus
- African cuckoo, Cuculus gularis
- Oriental cuckoo, Cuculus optatus - Aus
- Pallid cuckoo, Cuculus pallidus - Aus
- Brush cuckoo, Cuculus variolosus - Aus
- Chestnut-breasted cuckoo, Cacomantis castaneiventris - Aus
- Fan-tailed cuckoo, Cacomantis flabelliformis - Aus
- Black-eared cuckoo, Chrysococcyx osculans - Aus
- Horsfield's bronze cuckoo, Chrysococcyx basalis - Aus
- Shining bronze cuckoo, Chrysococcyx lucidus - Aus, NZ
- Little bronze cuckoo, Chrysococcyx minutillus - Aus
- Gould's bronze cuckoo, Chrysococcyx russatus - Aus
- Pacific koel, Eudynamys orientalis - Aus
- Long-tailed cuckoo, Eudynamys taitensis - Aus, NZ
- Channel-billed cuckoo, Scythrops novaehollandiae - Aus

=== Centropodidae ===
- Pheasant coucal, Centropus phasianinus - Aus

== Strigiformes ==
=== Strigidae ===
- Buffy fish owl, Ketupa ketupu
- Little owl, Athene noctua
- Powerful owl, Ninox strenua - Aus
- Rufous owl, Ninox rufa - Aus
- Barking owl, Ninox connivens - Aus
- Australian boobook, Ninox boobook - Aus
- Morepork, Ninox novaeseelandiae - Aus, NZ
- Brown hawk-owl, Ninox scutulata - Aus
- Christmas Island hawk-owl, Ninox natalis - Aus
- Laughing owl, Sceloglaux albifacies

=== Tytonidae ===
- Greater sooty owl, Tyto tenebricosa - Aus
- Lesser sooty owl, Tyto multipunctata - Aus
- Masked owl, Tyto novaehollandiae - Aus
- Barn owl, Tyto javanica - Aus
- Grass owl, Tyto longimembris - Aus

== Caprimulgiformes ==
=== Podargidae ===
- Tawny frogmouth, Podargus strigoides - Aus
- Papuan frogmouth, Podargus papuensis - Aus
- Marbled frogmouth, Podargus ocellatus - Aus

=== Caprimulgidae ===
- White-throated nightjar, Eurostopodus mystacalis - Aus
- Spotted nightjar, Eurostopodus argus - Aus
- Large-tailed nightjar, Caprimulgus macrurus - Aus
- Savanna nightjar, Caprimulgus affinis - Aus

=== Aegothelidae ===
- Australian owlet-nightjar, Aegotheles cristatus - Aus

== Apodiformes ==
=== Apodidae ===
- Glossy swiftlet, Collocalia esculenta - Aus
- White-rumped swiftlet, Collocalia spodiopygius - Aus
- Uniform swiftlet, Collocalia vanikorensis - Aus
- White-throated needletail, Hirundapus caudacutus - Aus
- Common swift, Apus apus - NZ
- Pacific swift, Apus pacificus - Aus
- House swift, Apus affinis - Aus

== Coraciiformes ==
=== Alcedinidae ===
- Azure kingfisher, Ceyx azureus - Aus
- Little kingfisher, Ceyx pusillus - Aus
- Buff-breasted paradise kingfisher, Tanysiptera sylvia - Aus
- Laughing kookaburra, Dacelo novaeguineae - Aus
- Blue-winged kookaburra, Dacelo leachii - Aus
- Yellow-billed kingfisher, Syma torotoro - Aus
- Forest kingfisher, Todiramphus macleayii - Aus
- Red-backed kingfisher, Todiramphus pyrrhopygia - Aus
- Sacred kingfisher, Todiramphus sanctus - Aus
- Torresian kingfisher, Todiramphus sordidus - Aus

=== Meropidae ===
- Rainbow bee-eater, Merops ornatus - Aus

=== Coraciidae ===
- Broad-billed roller, Eurystomus glaucurus
- Dollarbird, Eurystomus orientalis - Aus

== Passeriformes ==
=== Tyrannidae ===
- Eastern kingbird, Tyrannus tyrannus
- Dark-faced ground tyrant, Muscisaxicola macloviana

=== Acanthisittidae ===
- Rifleman, Acanthisitta chloris - NZ
- Bush wren, Xenicus longipes - NZ
- Rock wren, Xenicus gilviventris - NZ
- Lyall's wren, Traversia lyalli - NZ

=== Pittidae ===
- Papuan pitta, Erythropitta macklotii - Aus
- Blue-winged pitta, Pitta moluccensis - Aus
- Noisy pitta, Pitta versicolor - Aus
- Rainbow pitta, Pitta iris - Aus

=== Menuridae ===
- Albert's lyrebird, Menura alberti - Aus
- Superb lyrebird, Menura novaehollandiae - Aus

=== Atrichornithidae ===
- Rufous scrubbird, Atrichornis rufescens - Aus
- Noisy scrubbird, Atrichornis clamosus - Aus

=== Climacteridae ===
- White-throated treecreeper, Cormobates leucophaeus - Aus
- White-browed treecreeper, Climacteris affinis - Aus
- Red-browed treecreeper, Climacteris erythrops - Aus
- Brown treecreeper, Climacteris picumnus - Aus
- Black-tailed treecreeper, Climacteris melanura - Aus
- Rufous treecreeper, Climacteris rufa - Aus

=== Maluridae ===
- Purple-crowned fairywren, Malurus coronatus - Aus
- Superb fairywren, Malurus cyaneus - Aus
- Splendid fairywren, Malurus splendens - Aus
- Variegated fairywren, Malurus lamberti - Aus
- Lovely fairywren, Malurus amabilis - Aus
- Blue-breasted fairywren, Malurus pulcherrimus - Aus
- Red-winged fairywren, Malurus elegans - Aus
- White-winged fairywren, Malurus leucopterus - Aus
- Red-backed fairywren, Malurus melanocephalus - Aus
- Southern emu-wren, Stipiturus malachurus - Aus
- Mallee emu-wren, Stipiturus mallee - Aus
- Rufous-crowned emu-wren, Stipiturus ruficeps - Aus
- Grey grasswren, Amytornis barbatus - Aus
- Black grasswren, Amytornis housei - Aus
- White-throated grasswren, Amytornis woodwardi - Aus
- Carpentarian grasswren, Amytornis dorotheae - Aus
- Striated grasswren, Amytornis striatus - Aus
- Short-tailed grasswren, Amytornis merrotsyi - Aus
- Eyrean grasswren, Amytornis goyderi - Aus
- Thick-billed grasswren, Amytornis textilis - Aus
- Dusky grasswren, Amytornis purnelli - Aus
- Kalkadoon grasswren, Amytornis ballarae - Aus

=== Meliphagidae ===
- Red wattlebird, Anthochaera carunculata - Aus, NZ
- Yellow wattlebird, Anthochaera paradoxa - Aus
- Little wattlebird, Anthochaera chrysoptera - Aus
- Western wattlebird, Anthochaera lunulata - Aus
- Spiny-cheeked honeyeater, Acanthagenys rufogularis - Aus
- Striped honeyeater, Plectorhyncha lanceolata - Aus
- Helmeted friarbird, Philemon buceroides - Aus
- Silver-crowned friarbird, Philemon argenticeps - Aus
- Noisy friarbird, Philemon corniculatus - Aus
- Little friarbird, Philemon citreogularis - Aus
- Regent honeyeater, Anthochaera phrygia - Aus
- Blue-faced honeyeater, Entomyzon cyanotis - Aus
- Bell miner, Manorina melanophrys - Aus
- Noisy miner, Manorina melanocephala - Aus
- Yellow-throated miner, Manorina flavigula - Aus
- Black-eared miner, Manorina melanotis - Aus
- Macleay's honeyeater, Xanthotis macleayana - Aus
- Tawny-breasted honeyeater, Xanthotis flaviventer - Aus
- Lewin's honeyeater, Meliphaga lewinii - Aus
- Yellow-spotted honeyeater, Meliphaga notata - Aus
- Graceful honeyeater, Meliphaga gracilis - Aus
- White-lined honeyeater, Meliphaga albilineata - Aus
- Bridled honeyeater, Bolemoreus frenatus - Aus
- Eungella honeyeater, Bolemoreus hindwoodi - Aus
- Yellow-faced honeyeater, Caligavis chrysops - Aus
- Singing honeyeater, Gavicalis virescens - Aus
- Varied honeyeater, Gavicalis versicolor - Aus
- Mangrove honeyeater, Gavicalis fasciogularis - Aus
- White-gaped honeyeater, Stomiopera unicolor - Aus
- Yellow honeyeater, Stomiopera flava - Aus
- White-eared honeyeater, Nesoptilotis leucotis - Aus
- Yellow-throated honeyeater, Nesoptilotis flavicollis - Aus
- Yellow-tufted honeyeater, Lichenostomus melanops - Aus
- Purple-gaped honeyeater, Lichenostomus cratitius - Aus
- Grey-headed honeyeater, Ptilotula keartlandi - Aus
- Yellow-plumed honeyeater, Ptilotula ornata - Aus
- Grey-fronted honeyeater, Ptilotula plumula - Aus
- Fuscous honeyeater, Ptilotula fusca - Aus
- Yellow-tinted honeyeater, Ptilotula flavescens - Aus
- White-plumed honeyeater, Ptilotula penicillata - Aus
- Black-chinned honeyeater, Melithreptus gularis - Aus
- Strong-billed honeyeater, Melithreptus validirostris - Aus
- Brown-headed honeyeater, Melithreptus brevirostris - Aus
- White-throated honeyeater, Melithreptus albogularis - Aus
- White-naped honeyeater, Melithreptus lunatus - Aus
- Black-headed honeyeater, Melithreptus affinis - Aus
- Stitchbird, Notiomystis cincta - NZ
- Green-backed honeyeater, Glycichaera fallax - Aus
- Brown honeyeater, Lichmera indistincta - Aus
- White-streaked honeyeater, Trichodere cockerelli - Aus
- Painted honeyeater, Grantiella picta - Aus
- Crescent honeyeater, Phylidonyris pyrrhoptera - Aus
- New Holland honeyeater, Phylidonyris novaehollandiae - Aus
- White-cheeked honeyeater, Phylidonyris nigra - Aus
- Tawny-crowned honeyeater, Gliciphila melanops - Aus
- White-fronted honeyeater, Purnella albifrons - Aus
- Brown-backed honeyeater, Ramsayornis modestus - Aus
- Bar-breasted honeyeater, Ramsayornis fasciatus - Aus
- Rufous-banded honeyeater, Conopophila albogularis - Aus
- Rufous-throated honeyeater, Conopophila rufogularis - Aus
- Grey honeyeater, Conopophila whitei - Aus
- Eastern spinebill, Acanthorhynchus tenuirostris - Aus
- Western spinebill, Acanthorhynchus superciliosus - Aus
- Banded honeyeater, Cissomela pectoralis - Aus
- Black honeyeater, Sugomel niger - Aus
- Pied honeyeater, Certhionyx variegatus - Aus
- Dusky honeyeater, Myzomela obscura - Aus
- Red-headed honeyeater, Myzomela erythrocephala - Aus
- Scarlet honeyeater, Myzomela sanguinolenta - Aus
- Bellbird, Anthornis melanura - NZ
- Tūī, Prosthemadera novaeseelandiae - NZ
- Crimson chat, Epthianura tricolor - Aus
- Orange chat, Epthianura aurifrons - Aus
- Yellow chat, Epthianura crocea - Aus
- White-fronted chat, Epthianura albifrons - Aus
- Gibberbird, Ashbyia lovensis - Aus

=== Pardalotidae ===
- Spotted pardalote, Pardalotus punctatus - Aus
- Forty-spotted pardalote, Pardalotus quadragintus - Aus
- Red-browed pardalote, Pardalotus rubricatus - Aus
- Striated pardalote, Pardalotus striatus - Aus

=== Dasyornithidae ===
- Eastern bristlebird, Dasyornis brachypterus - Aus
- Rufous bristlebird, Dasyornis broadbenti - Aus
- Western bristlebird, Dasyornis longirostris - Aus

=== Acanthizidae ===
- Pilotbird, Pycnoptilus floccosus - Aus
- Rockwarbler, Origma solitaria - Aus
- Fernwren, Oreoscopus gutturalis - Aus
- Yellow-throated scrubwren, Sericornis citreogularis - Aus
- White-browed scrubwren, Sericornis frontalis - Aus
- Tasmanian scrubwren, Sericornis humilis - Aus
- Atherton scrubwren, Sericornis keri - Aus
- Large-billed scrubwren, Sericornis magnirostris - Aus
- Tropical scrubwren, Sericornis beccarii - Aus
- Scrubtit, Acanthornis magnus - Aus
- Chestnut-rumped heathwren, Hylacola pyrrhopygia - Aus
- Shy heathwren, Hylacola cauta - Aus
- Striated fieldwren, Calamanthus fuliginosus - Aus
- Rufous fieldwren, Calamanthus campestris - Aus
- Redthroat, Pyrrholaemus brunneus - Aus
- Speckled warbler, Chthonicola sagittatus - Aus
- Weebill, Smicrornis brevirostris - Aus
- Brown gerygone, Gerygone mouki - Aus
- Grey warbler, Gerygone igata - NZ
- Chatham Island warbler, Gerygone albofrontata - NZ
- Norfolk Island gerygone, Gerygone modesta - Aus
- Dusky gerygone, Gerygone tenebrosa - Aus
- Mangrove gerygone, Gerygone levigaster - Aus
- Western gerygone, Gerygone fusca - Aus
- Lord Howe gerygone, Gerygone insularis - Aus
- Large-billed gerygone, Gerygone magnirostris - Aus
- Green-backed gerygone, Gerygone chloronotus - Aus
- Fairy gerygone, Gerygone palpebrosa - Aus
- White-throated gerygone, Gerygone olivacea - Aus
- Mountain thornbill, Acanthiza katherina - Aus
- Brown thornbill, Acanthiza pusilla - Aus
- Inland thornbill, Acanthiza apicalis - Aus
- Tasmanian thornbill, Acanthiza ewingii - Aus
- Chestnut-rumped thornbill, Acanthiza uropygialis - Aus
- Slaty-backed thornbill, Acanthiza robustirostris - Aus
- Western thornbill, Acanthiza inornata - Aus
- Buff-rumped thornbill, Acanthiza reguloides - Aus
- Slender-billed thornbill, Acanthiza iredalei - Aus
- Yellow-rumped thornbill, Acanthiza chrysorrhoa - Aus
- Yellow thornbill, Acanthiza nana - Aus
- Striated thornbill, Acanthiza lineata - Aus
- Southern whiteface, Aphelocephala leucopsis - Aus
- Chestnut-breasted whiteface, Aphelocephala pectoralis - Aus
- Banded whiteface, Aphelocephala nigricincta - Aus

=== Petroicidae ===
- Jacky winter, Microeca fascinans - Aus
- Lemon-bellied flycatcher, Microeca flavigaster - Aus
- Yellow-legged flycatcher, Microeca griseoceps - Aus
- Scarlet robin, Petroica multicolor - Aus
- New Zealand tomtit, Petroica macrocephala - NZ
- Red-capped robin, Petroica goodenovii - Aus
- Flame robin, Petroica phoenicea - Aus
- Rose robin, Petroica rosea - Aus
- Pink robin, Petroica rodinogaster - Aus
- South Island robin, Petroica australis - NZ
- North Island robin, Petroica longipes - NZ
- Black robin, Petroica traversi - NZ
- Hooded robin, Melanodryas cucullata - Aus
- Dusky robin, Melanodryas vittata - Aus
- Pale-yellow robin, Tregellasia capito - Aus
- White-faced robin, Tregellasia leucops - Aus
- Eastern yellow robin, Eopsaltria australis - Aus
- Western yellow robin, Eopsaltria griseogularis - Aus
- White-breasted robin, Eopsaltria georgiana - Aus
- Mangrove robin, Eopsaltria pulverulenta - Aus
- White-browed robin, Poecilodryas superciliosa - Aus
- Grey-headed robin, Heteromyias cinereifrons - Aus
- Northern scrub robin, Drymodes superciliaris - Aus
- Southern scrub robin, Drymodes brunneopygia - Aus

=== Orthonychidae ===
- Logrunner, Orthonyx temminckii - Aus
- Chowchilla, Orthonyx spaldingii - Aus

=== Pomatostomidae ===
- Grey-crowned babbler, Pomatostomus temporalis - Aus
- White-browed babbler, Pomatostomus superciliosus - Aus
- Hall's babbler, Pomatostomus halli - Aus
- Chestnut-crowned babbler, Pomatostomus ruficeps - Aus

=== Cinclosomatidae ===
- Eastern whipbird, Psophodes olivaceus - Aus
- Western whipbird, Psophodes nigrogularis - Aus
- Chirruping wedgebill, Psophodes cristatus - Aus
- Chiming wedgebill, Psophodes occidentalis - Aus
- Spotted quail-thrush, Cinclosoma punctatum - Aus
- Chestnut quail-thrush, Cinclosoma castanotus - Aus
- Cinnamon quail-thrush, Cinclosoma cinnamomeum - Aus
- Nullarbor quail-thrush, Cinclosoma alisteri - Aus
- Chestnut-breasted quail-thrush, Cinclosoma castaneothorax - Aus
- Western quail-thrush, Cinclosoma marginatum - Aus

=== Neosittidae ===
- Varied sittella, Daphoenositta chrysoptera - Aus

=== Mohouidae ===
- Whitehead, Mohoua albicilla - NZ
- Yellowhead, Mohoua ochrocephala - NZ
- Brown creeper, Mohoua novaeseelandiae - NZ

=== Pachycephalidae ===
- Crested shrike-tit, Falcunculus frontatus - Aus
- Olive whistler, Pachycephala olivacea - Aus
- Red-lored whistler, Pachycephala rufogularis - Aus
- Gilbert's whistler, Pachycephala inornata - Aus
- Australian golden whistler, Pachycephala pectoralis - Aus
- Mangrove golden whistler, Pachycephala melanura - Aus
- Western whistler, Pachycephala occidentalis - Aus
- Grey whistler, Pachycephala simplex - Aus
- Rufous whistler, Pachycephala rufiventris - Aus
- White-breasted whistler, Pachycephala lanioides - Aus
- Little shrike-thrush, Colluricincla megarhyncha - Aus
- Bower's shrike-thrush, Colluricincla boweri - Aus
- Sandstone shrike-thrush, Colluricincla woodwardi - Aus
- Grey shrike-thrush, Colluricincla harmonica - Aus

=== Oreoicidae ===
- Crested bellbird, Oreoica gutturalis - Aus

=== Monarchidae ===
- Yellow-breasted boatbill, Machaerirhynchus flaviventer - Aus
- Black-faced monarch, Monarcha melanopsis - Aus
- Black-winged monarch, Monarcha frater - Aus
- Spectacled monarch, Symposiachrus trivirgatus - Aus
- White-eared monarch, Carterornis leucotis - Aus
- Frilled monarch, Arses telescophthalmus - Aus
- Pied monarch, Arses kaupi - Aus
- Broad-billed flycatcher, Myiagra ruficollis - Aus
- Leaden flycatcher, Myiagra rubecula - Aus
- Satin flycatcher, Myiagra cyanoleuca - Aus
- Shining flycatcher, Myiagra alecto - Aus
- Restless flycatcher, Myiagra inquieta - Aus
- Magpie-lark, Grallina cyanoleuca - Aus

=== Rhipiduridae ===
- Rufous fantail, Rhipidura rufifrons - Aus
- New Zealand fantail, Rhipidura fuliginosa - NZ
- Grey fantail, Rhipidura albiscapa - Aus
- Mangrove grey fantail, Rhipidura phasiana - Aus
- Northern fantail, Rhipidura rufiventris - Aus
- Willie wagtail, Rhipidura leucophrys - Aus

=== Dicruridae ===
- Spangled drongo, Dicrurus bracteatus - Aus

=== Campephagidae ===
- Black-faced cuckooshrike, Coracina novaehollandiae - Aus
- Barred cuckooshrike, Coracina lineata - Aus
- White-bellied cuckooshrike, Coracina papuensis - Aus
- Cicadabird, Coracina tenuirostris - Aus
- Ground cuckooshrike, Coracina maxima - Aus
- White-winged triller, Lalage sueurii - Aus
- Varied triller, Lalage leucomela - Aus
- Long-tailed triller, Lalage leucopyga

=== Oriolidae ===
- Yellow oriole, Oriolus flavocinctus - Aus
- Olive-backed oriole, Oriolus sagittatus - Aus
- Australasian figbird, Sphecotheres vieilloti - Aus
- Piopio, Turnagra capensis - NZ

=== Artamidae ===
- White-breasted woodswallow, Artamus leucorynchus - Aus
- Masked woodswallow, Artamus personatus - Aus, NZ
- White-browed woodswallow, Artamus superciliosus - Aus, NZ
- Black-faced woodswallow, Artamus cinereus - Aus
- Dusky woodswallow, Artamus cyanopterus - Aus
- Little woodswallow, Artamus minor - Aus
- Black butcherbird, Cracticus quoyi - Aus
- Grey butcherbird, Cracticus torquatus - Aus
- Silver-backed butcherbird, Cracticus argenteus - Aus
- Black-backed butcherbird, Cracticus mentalis - Aus
- Pied butcherbird, Cracticus nigrogularis - Aus
- Pied currawong, Strepera graculina - Aus
- Black currawong, Strepera fuliginosa - Aus
- Grey currawong, Strepera versicolor - Aus
- Australian magpie, Gymnorhina tibicen - Aus, NZ

=== Paradisaeidae ===
- Paradise riflebird, Ptiloris paradiseus - Aus
- Victoria's riflebird, Ptiloris victoriae - Aus
- Magnificent riflebird, Ptiloris magnificus - Aus
- Trumpet manucode, Manucodia keraudrenii - Aus

=== Corvidae ===
- Rook, Corvus frugilegus - NZ, introduced
- Australian raven, Corvus coronoides - Aus
- Forest raven, Corvus tasmanicus - Aus
- Little raven, Corvus mellori - Aus
- Little crow, Corvus bennetti - Aus
- Torresian crow, Corvus orru - Aus

=== Corcoracidae ===
- White-winged chough, Corcorax melanorhamphos - Aus
- Apostlebird, Struthidea cinerea - Aus

=== Callaeidae ===
- South Island kōkako, Callaeas cinereus - NZ
- North Island kōkako, Callaeas wilsoni - NZ
- South Island saddleback, Philesturnus carunculatus - NZ
- North Island saddleback, Philesturnus rufusater - NZ
- Huia, Heteralocha acutirostris - NZ

=== Laniidae ===
- Brown shrike, Lanius cristatus - Aus
- Red-backed shrike, Lanius collurio

=== Ptilonorhynchidae ===
- Spotted catbird, Ailuroedus melanotis - Aus
- Green catbird, Ailuroedus crassirostris - Aus
- Tooth-billed bowerbird, Scenopoeetes dentirostris - Aus
- Golden bowerbird, Prionodura newtoniana - Aus
- Regent bowerbird, Sericulus chrysocephalus - Aus
- Satin bowerbird, Ptilonorhynchus violaceus - Aus
- Spotted bowerbird, Chlamydera maculata - Aus
- Western bowerbird, Chlamydera guttata - Aus
- Great bowerbird, Chlamydera nuchalis - Aus
- Fawn-breasted bowerbird, Chlamydera cerviniventris - Aus

=== Alaudidae ===
- Singing bushlark, Mirafra javanica - Aus
- Skylark, Alauda arvensis - Aus

=== Motacillidae ===
- Richard's pipit, Anthus novaeseelandiae - Aus, NZ
- Correndera pipit, Anthus correndera
- Red-throated pipit, Anthus cervinus - Aus
- Yellow wagtail, Motacilla flava - Aus
- Citrine wagtail, Motacilla citreola - Aus
- Grey wagtail, Motacilla cinerea - Aus
- White wagtail, Motacilla alba - Aus
- Black-backed wagtail, Motacilla lugens - Aus

=== Prunellidae ===
- Dunnock, Prunella modularis - NZ

=== Passeridae ===
- House sparrow, Passer domesticus - Aus, NZ, introduced
- Eurasian tree sparrow, Passer montanus - Aus, introduced

=== Estrildidae ===
- Zebra finch, Taeniopygia guttata - Aus
- Double-barred finch, Taeniopygia bichenovii - Aus
- Long-tailed finch, Poephila acuticauda - Aus
- Black-throated finch, Poephila cincta - Aus
- Masked finch, Poephila personata - Aus
- Crimson finch, Neochmia phaeton - Aus
- Star finch, Neochmia ruficauda - Aus
- Plum-headed finch, Neochmia modesta - Aus
- Red-browed finch, Neochmia temporalis - Aus
- Diamond firetail, Stagonopleura guttata - Aus
- Beautiful firetail, Stagonopleura bella - Aus
- Red-eared firetail, Stagonopleura oculata - Aus
- Painted finch, Emblema pictum - Aus
- Nutmeg mannikin, Lonchura punctulata - Aus
- Yellow-rumped mannikin, Lonchura flaviprymna - Aus
- Chestnut-breasted mannikin, Lonchura castaneothorax - Aus
- Java sparrow, Lonchura oryzivora - Aus
- Pale-headed munia, Lonchura pallida - Aus
- Pictorella mannikin, Heteromunia pectoralis - Aus
- Blue-faced parrotfinch, Erythrura trichroa - Aus
- Gouldian finch, Erythrura gouldiae - Aus

=== Fringillidae ===
- Common chaffinch, Fringilla coelebs - Aus, NZ, introduced
- European greenfinch, Chloris chloris - Aus, NZ, introduced
- European goldfinch, Carduelis carduelis - Aus, NZ, introduced
- Common redpoll, Acanthis flammea - Aus, NZ, introduced
- Long-tailed meadowlark, Sturnella loyca - introduced

=== Emberizidae ===
- Yellowhammer, Emberiza citrinella - Aus, NZ, introduced
- Cirl bunting, Emberiza cirlus - NZ, introduced

=== Nectariniidae ===
- Yellow-bellied sunbird, Nectarinia jugularis - Aus

=== Dicaeidae ===
- Mistletoebird, Dicaeum hirundinaceum - Aus
- Red-capped flowerpecker, Dicaeum geelvinkianum - Aus

=== Hirundinidae ===
- White-rumped swallow, Tachycineta leucorrhoa
- White-backed swallow, Cheramoeca leucosternus - Aus
- Sand martin, Riparia riparia
- Barn swallow, Hirundo rustica - Aus
- Welcome swallow, Hirundo neoxena - Aus
- Red-rumped swallow, Hirundo daurica - Aus
- Tree martin, Hirundo nigricans - Aus
- Fairy martin, Hirundo ariel - Aus
- Asian house martin, Hirundo dasypus - Aus

=== Pycnonotidae ===
- Red-whiskered bulbul, Pycnonotus jocosus - Aus

=== Acrocephalidae ===
- Clamorous reed warbler, Acrocephalus stentoreus - Aus
- Oriental reed warbler, Acrocephalus orientalis - Aus

=== Phylloscopidae ===
- Willow warbler, Phylloscopus trochilus
- Arctic warbler, Phylloscopus borealis - Aus

=== Locustellidae ===
- Tawny grassbird, Megalurus timoriensis - Aus
- Little grassbird, Megalurus gramineus - Aus
- Fernbird, Megalurus punctatus - NZ
- Chatham fernbird, Megalurus rufescens - NZ
- Spinifexbird, Megalurus carteri - Aus
- Rufous songlark, Megalurus mathewsi - Aus
- Brown songlark, Megalurus cruralis - Aus

=== Cisticolidae ===
- Zitting cisticola, Cisticola juncidis - Aus
- Golden-headed cisticola, Cisticola exilis - Aus

=== Zosteropidae ===
- Christmas white-eye, Zosterops natalis - Aus
- Pale white-eye, Zosterops citrinellus - Aus
- Yellow white-eye, Zosterops luteus - Aus
- Silvereye, Zosterops lateralis - Aus, NZ
- Robust white-eye, Zosterops strenuus - Aus
- Slender-billed white-eye, Zosterops tenuirostris - Aus
- White-chested white-eye, Zosterops albogularis - Aus

=== Turdidae ===
- Bassian thrush, Zoothera lunulata - Aus
- Russet-tailed thrush, Zoothera heinei - Aus
- Blackbird, Turdus merula - Aus
- Island thrush, Turdus poliocephalus - Aus
- Song thrush, Turdus philomelos - Aus

=== Muscicapidae ===
- Blue rock thrush, Monticola solitarius - Aus
- Narcissus flycatcher, Ficedula narcissina - Aus
- Blue-and-white flycatcher, Cyanoptila cyanomelana - Aus
- Mountain wheatear, Oenanthe monticola

=== Sturnidae ===
- Tasman starling, Aplonis fusca - Aus
- Metallic starling, Aplonis metallica - Aus
- Singing starling, Aplonis cantoroides - Aus
- Common starling, Sturnus vulgaris - Aus, NZ, introduced
- Daurian starling, Agropsar sturninus
- Common myna, Acridotheres tristis - Aus, NZ, introduced

== See also ==
- List of Australian birds
- List of New Zealand birds
- List of birds of Antarctica
- Birds of Australia
