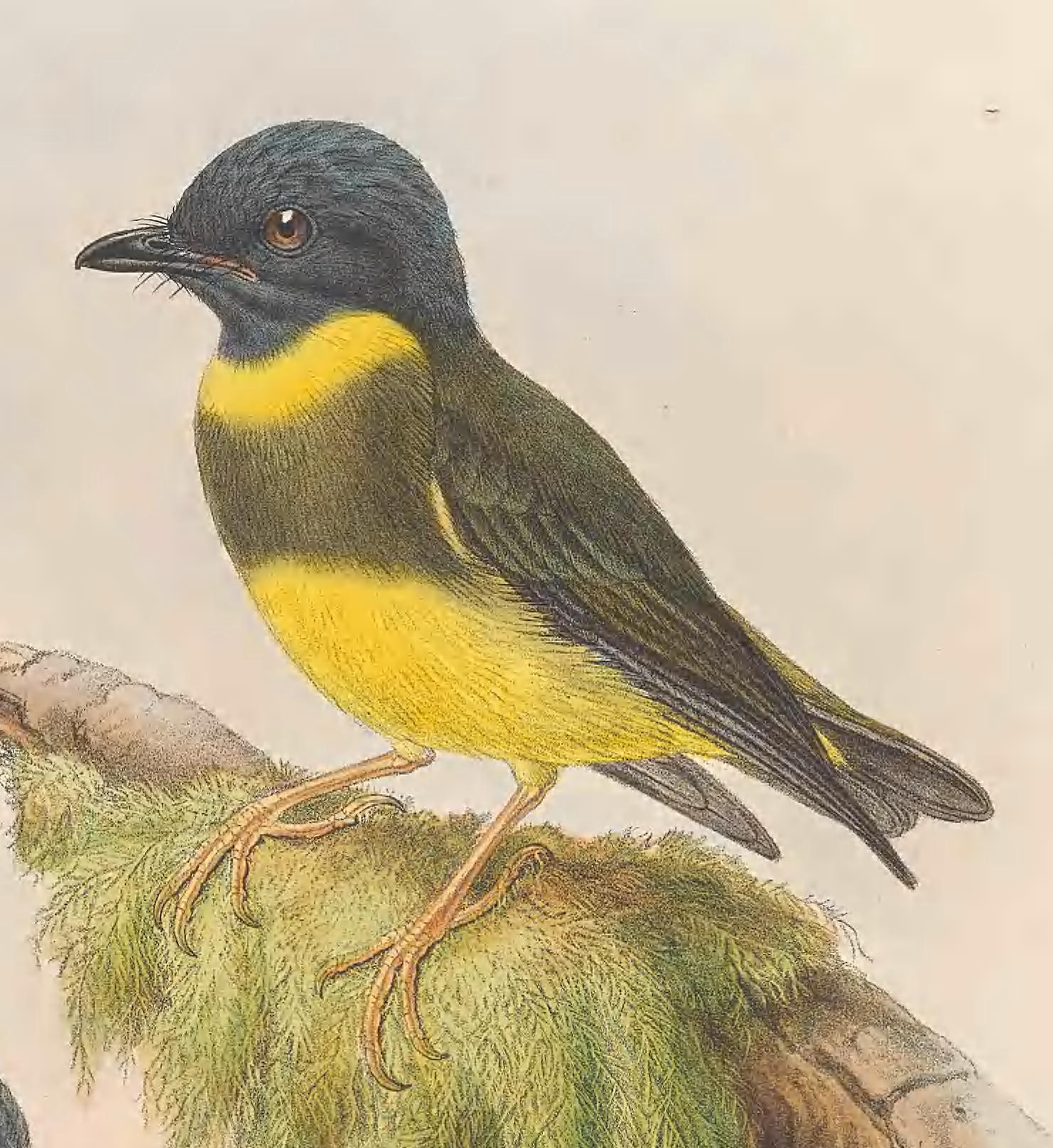
- Illustration by John Gould and W. Hart

Conservation status
- Least Concern (IUCN 3.1)

Scientific classification
- Kingdom: Animalia
- Phylum: Chordata
- Class: Aves
- Order: Passeriformes
- Family: Petroicidae
- Genus: Eopsaltria
- Species: E. placens

Binomial name
- Eopsaltria placens Ramsay, E.P., 1879

Synonyms
- Poecilodryas placens; Gennaeodryas placens

= Banded yellow robin =

Species of songbird native to New Guinea

The banded yellow robin or olive-yellow robin (Eopsaltria placens) is a species of bird in the Australasian robin family Petroicidae that is found in New Guinea. Its natural habitats are subtropical or tropical moist lowland forest and subtropical or tropical moist montane forest. It is threatened by habitat loss.

== Taxonomy ==
The banded yellow robin was described in 1879 as Eopsaltria placens by the Australian zoologist, Edward Pierson Ramsay from a specimen collected in southeastern New Guinea. The specific epithet is Latin meaning "charming" or "pleasing". The species was subsequently placed in the genus Poecilodryas. Based on a 2011 molecular genetic study by Les Christidis and coworkers, it was moved into the resurrected genus Gennaeodryas, and is now placed in a more broadly defined Eopsaltria. The species is monotypic: no subspecies are recognised.
