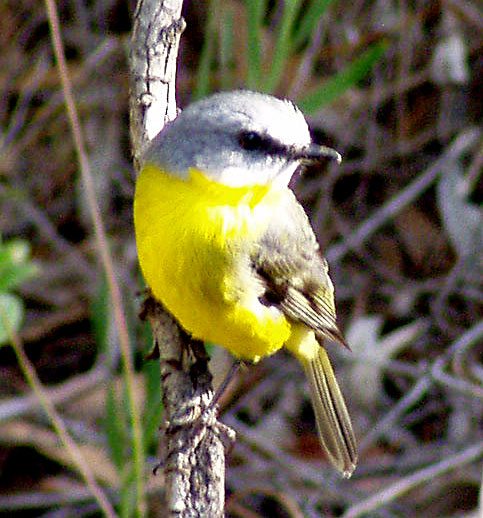
- Eastern yellow robin, Australian National Botanic Gardens

Scientific classification
- Kingdom: Animalia
- Phylum: Chordata
- Class: Aves
- Order: Passeriformes
- Family: Petroicidae
- Genus: Eopsaltria; Swainson, 1832

Type species
- Motacilla australis Shaw, 1790

Species
- see text

Synonyms
- Quoyornis Mathews, 1912; Tregellasia Mathews, 1912; Gennaeodryas Mathews, 1920

= Eopsaltria =

Genus of birds

Eopsaltria is a genus of small forest passerines known in Australia as the yellow robins. They belong to the Australasian robin family Petroicidae. The name is derived from the Ancient Greek for "dawn singer/song" because of their dawn chorus. They are inquisitive and bold birds, and have been reported perching on the shoulders or boots of people in the bush. Open eucalyptus woodlands are their preferred habitat. The ornithologist John Gould likened the behaviour and mannerisms of the eastern and western yellow robin to those of the European robin. The name "yellow robin" itself was applied to the eastern yellow robin by the early settlers of New South Wales.

== Taxonomy and systematics ==
The ornithologist William Swainson named the genus Eopsaltria in 1832, placing into it the bird that was then known as the yellow-breasted thrush (Pachycephala australis). Two species are currently classified within the genus: the eastern and western yellow robins, which have been alternately classified as a single species by Julian Ford since 1979 on account of similarities in their calls and behaviour. The eastern yellow robin itself was historically split into two species, the northern populations were given the name northern yellow robin (E. chrysorrhoa) while the remaining groups were known as the southern yellow robin.

Another species, the mangrove robin Peneoenanthe pulverulenta was often included in this genus. Although its plumage resembled that of the white-breasted robin, DNA analysis revealed it should be classified as a member of the New Guinea genus Peneothello.

Previously the two members of the genus Tregellasia were included in this genus; the pale-yellow robin (Tregellasia capito) and white-faced robin (T. leucops). The yellow-bellied flyrobin (Microeca flaviventris) of New Caledonia was previously classified in this genus as it had similar plumage, but a genetic analysis of nuclear and mitochondrial DNA has placed it in the genus Microeca. Its nest and eggs resemble those of members of Microeca rather than Eopsaltria. The same study placed the white-breasted robin as sister taxon to the two Tregellasia robins and proposed the genus be sunk once again into Eopsaltria.

=== Extant species ===
The genus contains the following six species:

| Image | Common name | Scientific name | Distribution |
|---|---|---|---|
| | Banded yellow robin | Eopsaltria placens | patchily distributed New Guinea, including Batanta (Raja Ampat Islands, off western New Guinea) |
| | Eastern yellow robin | Eopsaltria australis | Coastal and sub-coastal eastern Australia |
| | Western yellow robin | Eopsaltria griseogularis | southwestern Western Australia |
| | White-breasted robin | Eopsaltria georgiana | southwestern Western Australia (Kalbarri to Esperance) |
| | Pale-yellow robin | Eopsaltria capito | east Australia |
| | White-faced robin | Eopsaltria leucops | New Guinea and northeast Cape York Peninsula (far northeast Australia) |

=== Former species ===
Formerly, some authorities also considered the following species (or subspecies) as species within the genus Eopsaltria:

- Grey whistler (sudestensis) (as Eopsaltria sudestensis)
- Melanesian whistler (cucullata) (as Eopsaltria cucullata)
- Tongan whistler (as Eopsaltria melanops)
- Samoan whistler (as Eopsaltria flavifrons)
