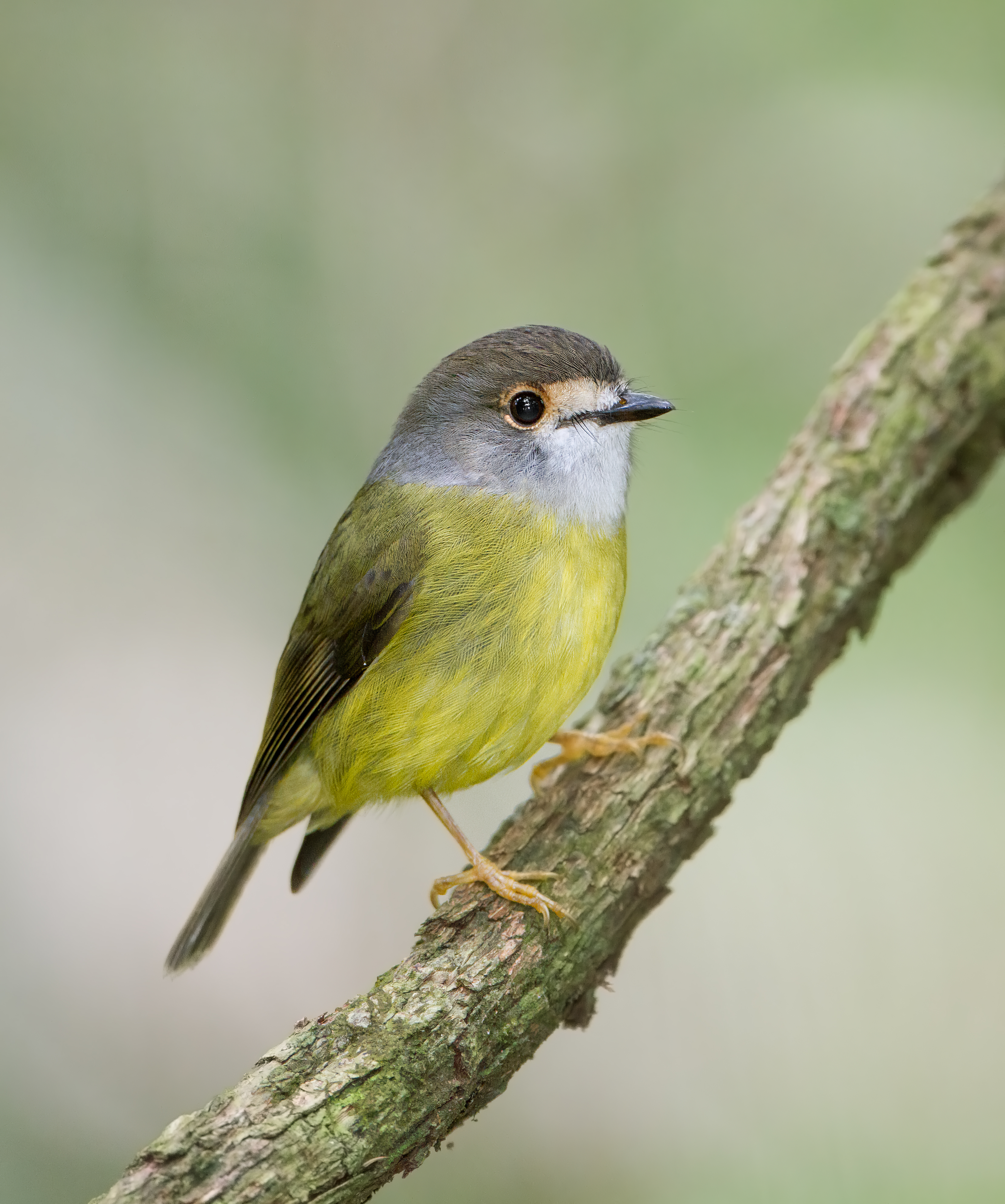
- Subspecies capito

Conservation status
- Least Concern (IUCN 3.1)

Scientific classification
- Kingdom: Animalia
- Phylum: Chordata
- Class: Aves
- Order: Passeriformes
- Family: Petroicidae
- Genus: Eopsaltria
- Species: E. capito

Binomial name
- Eopsaltria capito Gould, 1854
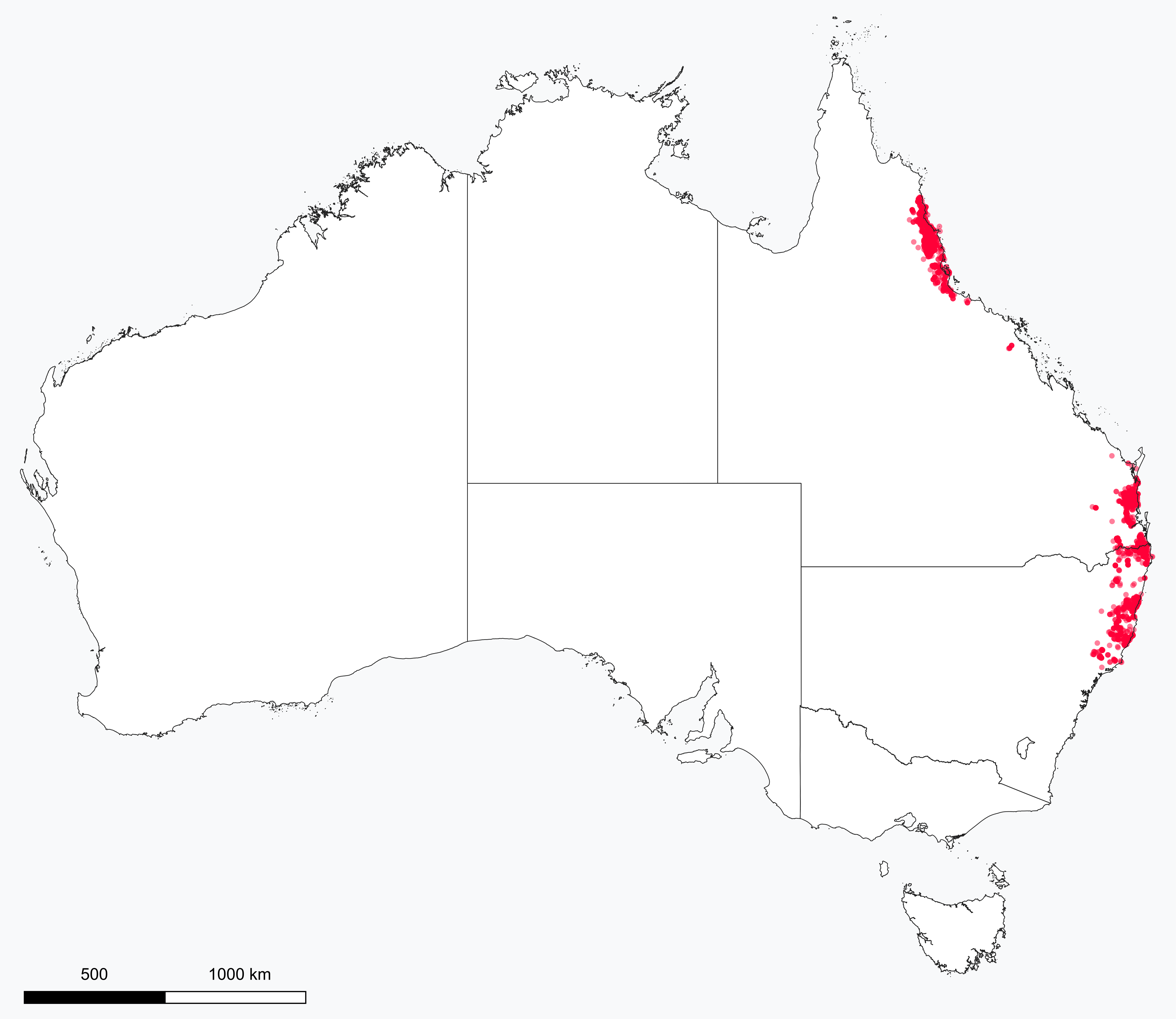
- Species distribution

Synonyms
- Tregellasia capito

= Pale-yellow robin =

Species of songbird native to eastern Australia

The pale-yellow robin (Eopsaltria capito) is a species of passerine bird in the family Petroicidae. It is endemic to eastern Australia. Its natural habitat is subtropical or tropical moist lowland forests. It is an undistinguished bird with a grey head and olive upperparts, white throat and yellow underparts. The genders are similar. Two subspecies are recognised: the smaller nana from North Queensland, and the larger and uncommon nominate race capito from southeast Queensland and northeastern New South Wales. It is also insectivorous.

== Taxonomy ==
The pale-yellow robin was formally described in 1854 as Eopsaltria capito by the English ornithologist John Gould based on a specimen collected near the Brisbane River in Queensland, Australia. The specific epithet is from Latin meaning "big-headed". The pale-yellow robin was formerly usually placed in the genus Tregellasia, but based on a 2011 molecular genetic study by Les Christidis and coworkers, Tregellasia was merged into a more broadly defined Eopsaltria. Like all Australian robins, it is not closely related to either the European robin or the American robin, but belongs rather to the Corvida parvorder, comprising many tropical and Australian passerines, including pardalotes, fairy-wrens and honeyeaters, as well as crows. Alternate common names given to the species have been large-headed robin and pale robin.

=== Subspecies ===
Two subspecies are recognised:

- E. c. capito is the nominate race from rainforests of northeastern New South Wales and southeastern Queensland. Larger than the northern subspecies, it has a paler off-white face and is uncommon within its range.
- E. c. nana, described in 1878 as Eopsaltria nana by Edward Ramsay from a specimen collected in Cardwell, has been called the buff-faced or rufous-lored robin, and is found in rainforests in far north Queensland. It is smaller than the southern subspecies, and its subspecific name nana is Latin for 'dwarf'. It has a pale tan face and a pale orange-brown eye ring, hence its common name. It is fairly abundant within its range.

Mount Mee SF, SE Queensland, Australia

== Description ==
The male and female pale-yellow robin are similar in plumage. Measuring 12–13.5 centimetres (4.7–5.3 in) and weighing 15–18 grams (0.53–0.63 oz), it is a bird of subdued appearance, with a grey head and nape blending into olive-green upperparts, more brownish on the wings and tail. The throat is white, and the lores are off-white in the southern race and buff in the northern race. The breast and belly are yellow. The legs are yellow-orange and the iris dark brown. The thin black bill is around 1.5 centimetres (0.59 in) long. Juvenile birds are rufous with paler streaks on the head. It can be distinguished from the eastern yellow robin, as the latter bird has black legs and is a little larger.

The pale-yellow robin makes a trilling call when displaying or defending its territory.

== Distribution and habitat ==
Sedentary in its range, the pale-yellow robin is found from Mount Amos to Paluma in North Queensland, and from Cooloola on the Sunshine Coast south to Barrington Tops National Park in New South Wales. It prefers rainforests or dense eucalypt forests, particularly where the lawyer vine grows.

== Behaviour ==
The pale-yellow robin is arboreal and secretive. It is predominantly insectivorous, though may supplement its diet with seeds.

=== Breeding ===
It uses the prickly lawyer vine (Calamus muelleri) as nesting material and as a nest site. The nest may be anywhere up to 10 m (30 ft) above the ground, though often much lower. Breeding season is July to December with one, or sometimes two, broods. A clutch of 2 oval eggs, measuring 20 by 15 millimetres (0.79 in × 0.59 in), is laid. They are pale green, splotched with brownish marks.
