= Handbook of Australian, New Zealand and Antarctic Birds =

Scientific reference on birds

HANZAB Volume 5

The Handbook of Australian, New Zealand and Antarctic Birds, known as HANZAB, is the pre-eminent scientific reference on birds in the region, which includes Australia, New Zealand, Antarctica, and the surrounding ocean and subantarctic islands. It attempts to collate all that is known about each of the 957 species recorded.

HANZAB is the largest project ever undertaken by the Royal Australasian Ornithologists Union (RAOU), also known as Birds Australia. It was prepared over 20 years by teams of full and part-time writers, editors and artists, and published by Oxford University Press in seven volumes between 1990 and 2006 (volumes 1 and 7 each in two parts).

== Contents of each volume ==
1. Ratites to Ducks (in two parts) (1990) 1408 pp.
2. Raptors to Lapwings (1993) 1048 pp.
3. Snipe to Pigeons (1996) 1086 pp.
4. Parrots to Dollarbird (1999) 1248 pp.
5. Tyrant-flycatchers to Chats (2001) 1272 pp.
6. Pardalotes to Shrike-thrushes (2002) 1263 pp.
7. Boatbill to Starlings (in two parts) (2006) 1992 pp.
