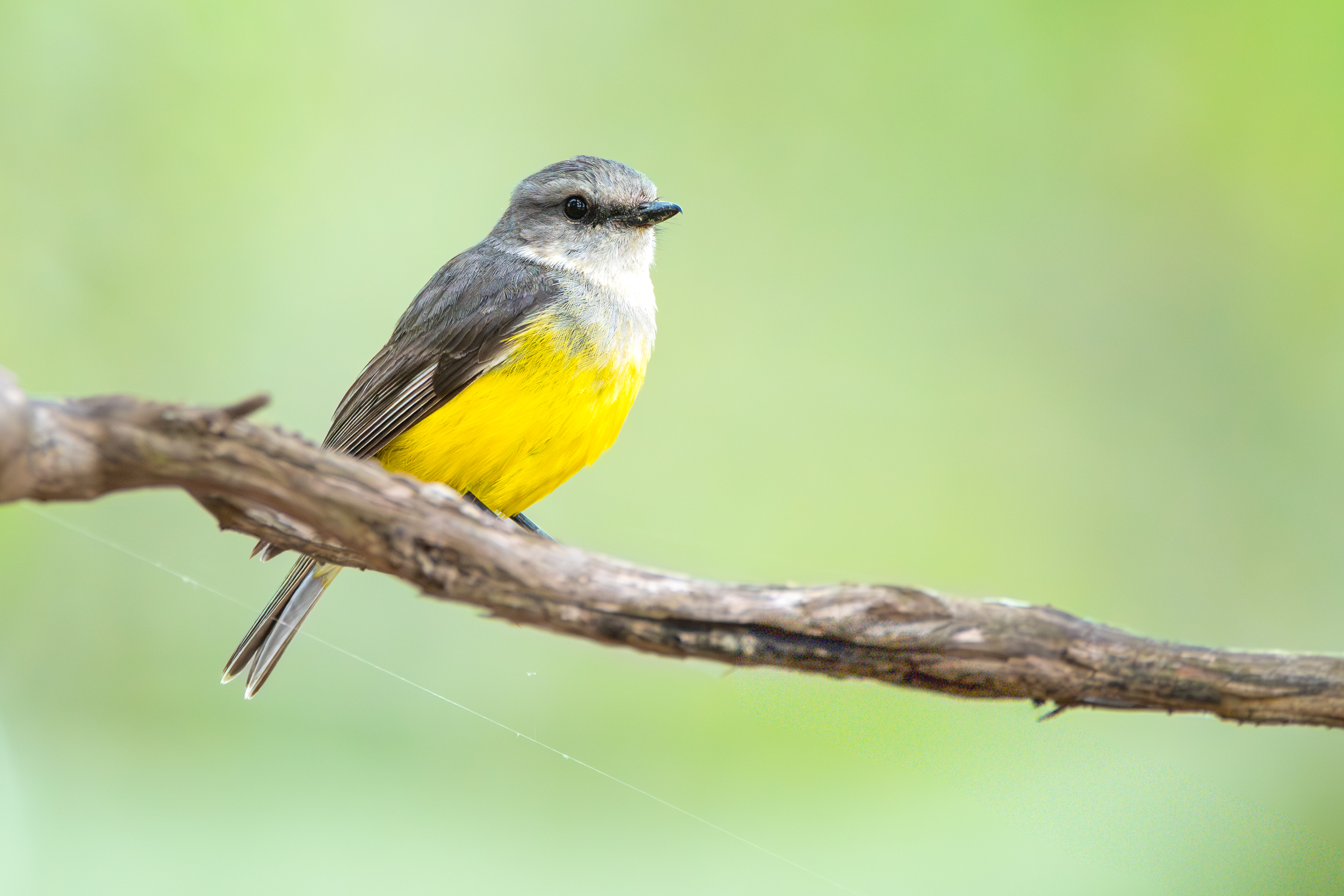
- Ssp. griseogularis sittin on a branch near Stirling Range National Park, SW Australia.

Conservation status
- Least Concern (IUCN 3.1)

Scientific classification
- Kingdom: Animalia
- Phylum: Chordata
- Class: Aves
- Order: Passeriformes
- Family: Petroicidae
- Genus: Eopsaltria
- Species: E. griseogularis

Binomial name
- Eopsaltria griseogularis Gould, 1838
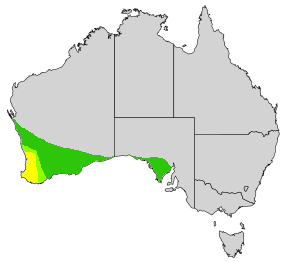
- Range – subsp. griseogularis – yellow hybrid zone – light green subspecies rosinae – dark green

= Western yellow robin =

Species of songbird native to southern Australia

The western yellow robin (Eopsaltria griseogularis) is a species of bird in the Australasian robin family, Petroicidae, native to Australia. Described by John Gould in 1838, the western yellow robin and its Australian relatives are not closely related to either the European or American robins, but they appear to be an early offshoot of the Passerida group of songbirds. Ranging between 13.5 and 15.5 cm (5 1/4 and 6 in) long, it has grey upperparts, and a grey breast and head, broken by whitish streaks near the bill and below the eye, with a conspicuous yellow belly. The sexes are similar in appearance. Two subspecies are recognized: subspecies griseogularis, which has a yellow rump, and subspecies rosinae with an olive-green rump.

The species inhabits open eucalypt jungle, woodland, and scrub, generally favouring habitats with significant understory. Its range comprises the Southwest of Western Australia and the state's southern coastline, as well as the Eyre Peninsula in South Australia. It breeds in a cup-shaped nest in a tree. Predominantly insectivorous, the western yellow robin pounces on prey from a low branch or forages on the ground. Although it is rated as least concern on the International Union for Conservation of Nature (IUCN)'s Red List of Threatened Species, it has declined in parts of its range.

== Taxonomy ==
English ornithologist John Gould described the western yellow robin as Eopsaltria griseogularis in 1838, referring to a specimen collected at the Swan River Colony. The genus Eopsaltria had been introduced by English naturalist William Swainson six years earlier for what is now the eastern yellow robin (E. australis). The specific name is derived from the Medieval Latin words griseus, meaning 'grey', and gula meaning "throat". Gould reported that it was common both at the new colony on the Swan Coastal Plain and at any site with brush-like shrubs. It was included in the first collection of local fauna assembled for the newly founded Zoological Society of London in the 1830s.

In 1979, Western Australian ornithologist Julian Ford proposed treatment of the western and eastern yellow robin as a single species on account of similarities in calls, ecology, and behavior. Playback of one species' calls in the other's territory evoked a response. Bird taxonomist Richard Schodde did not feel that this finding warranted the lumping of the two species and concluded in 1999 that they formed a superspecies. Analyses of mitochondrial and nuclear DNA of Australasian robins in 2009 and 2011 revealed that the divergence between the eastern and western yellow robin was consistent with species-level separation, confirming their status as distinct species.

Amateur ornithologist Gregory Mathews described a second subspecies—Eopsaltria griseogularis rosinae—in 1912, named for Ethel Rosina White, wife of South Australian ornithologist, Samuel Albert White. (Note: Mathews was a controversial figure in Australian ornithology. He was responsible for bringing trinomial nomenclature into local taxonomy, but was regarded as an extreme splitter. He recognized many subspecies on scant evidence and few notes. In particular, this drew a hostile response from Archibald James Campbell, a leading Australian figure in birds at the time. He later began splitting genera. Dominic Serventy foretold that, although a great many of these subspecies ceased to be recognized, future research would have to resort to the use of some of them, if and when evidence supported their distinct status.) Schodde observed that the delineation between subspecies does not correspond with a change in habitat and was hence valid.

Western yellow robin is the official name given to this species by the International Ornithologists' Union (IOC). Like all Australasian robins, it is not closely related to either the European robin (Erithacus rubecula) or the American robin (Turdus migratorius), but rather belongs in the Australasian robin family Petroicidae. The family is most closely related to the families Eupetidae (rail-babbler), Chaetopidae (rockjumper), and Picathartidae (rockfowl).

Gould called it 'grey-breasted robin' in 1848, and other names used included grey-breasted shrike-robin and grey-breasted yellow robin from the late 19th and early 20th centuries. The 'shrike-' prefix was dropped by the Royal Australasian Ornithologists Union (RAOU) in 1926. The earliest recorded name is b'am-boore—reported by English naturalist and explorer John Gilbert in 1840, and published in Gould's Birds of Australia—is derived from the Nyungar language. The orthographic or dialectal variations in the notes of colonial authors have been assessed, and a recommendation for regular spelling as bamborn and guide to pronunciation as bam'bam was proposed by Ian Abbott in 2009.

== Description ==
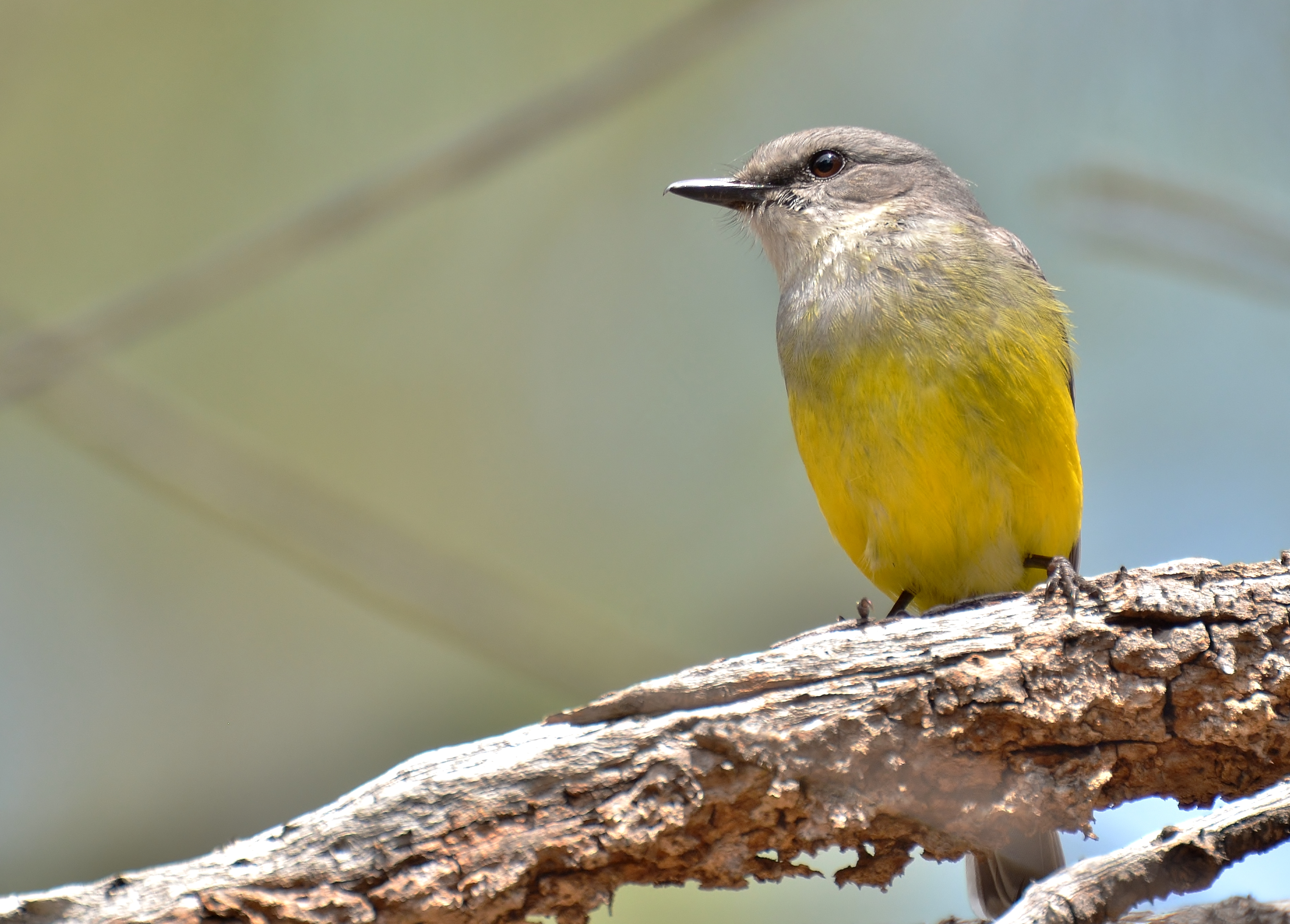
Seen from below, showing yellow underparts

The western yellow robin ranges between 13.5 and 15.5 cm (5 1/4 and 6 in) long, with a wingspan of 24–27.5 cm (9 1/2–10 3/4 in) and weight of 20 g (0.7 oz). The male and female are similar in size and coloration, with no seasonal variation in plumage. The head, neck, and upper parts are grey, with a white throat fading into a grey breast. The lores are black, the eyebrows are paler grey, and there is some faint pale streaking over the ear coverts. The underparts are yellow and clearly delineated from the breast. The rump and upper tail coverts are yellow in the nominate subspecies and olive-green in subspecies rosinae. There is a broad area of intermediate coloration between the core ranges of the two subspecies. Birds of subspecies rosinae have longer wings and tail overall, and a shorter bill and tarsus. Those from the west coast between Cliff Head and Kalbarri are significantly smaller overall. Intermediate forms between the two subspecies are found over a broad band between Lancelin and Jurien Bay southeast through the inner Wheatbelt to the coast between Denmark and Fitzgerald River National Park.

Juveniles have dark brownish head, neck, and upper parts coarsely streaked with creamy white. The lores are black. The chin and throat are grey-white, the breast is cream and brown, and the belly is white or off-white, tinged with brown. They molt after a few months into immature plumage, resembling adults but retaining some brownish flight feathers and secondary coverts on their wings and tail.

The western yellow robin produces its song with sequences of extended whistles, begun with two briefly piped notes. Its song is often heard before dawn, described as having a mournful quality, and is a familiar sound in southwest forests and woodlands. It also utters a scolding call, transcribed as ch-churr or churr-churr, and a two-syllabled zitting call. Around nesting time, the female utters a courtship or food-begging call, composed of a long note with a deeper staccato note at the end.

It does not resemble any other species within its range. The similar eastern yellow robin is found only in the eastern states. Immature birds closely resemble immature white-breasted robins (Quoyornis georgianus), though both are usually close by their respective parents. Young western yellow robins also have an olive tinge to the edges of their flight and tail feathers, and gain yellow feathers on their bellies as they molt from juvenile plumage.

== Distribution and habitat ==
In Western Australia, the western yellow robin is found south and west of an imaginary line between Kalbarri and Norseman, though it is largely absent from the coastal plain between Dongara and Rockingham. It is a rare vagrant north to Shark Bay and Toolonga Nature Reserve. Along the southern coastline, it occurs in a broken distribution to the South Australian border, at Eucla, Hampton Tableland, and the Roe Plains. In South Australia, it is found from Yalata east to the Eyre Peninsula where it extends north to the Gawler Ranges and east to Middleback Range. It is sedentary across its range.

The nominate Eopsaltria griseogularis griseogularis ranges along the coastal southwest Western Australia from Lancelin in the north and inland to Northam and southeast to King George Sound. Subspecies Eopsaltria griseogularis rosinae occurs from Jurien Bay and Tamala then inland across the Wheatbelt and Goldfields to the southeastern Western Australian coastline, across the Great Australian Bight and on the Eyre Peninsula.

Within its range, the western yellow robin is found in eucalypt forest and woodland, and mallee and acacia-shrubland in drier (semi-arid) regions. Fieldwork in the Dryandra Woodland found that it prefers locations with thicker canopy, a thicker layer of leaf litter, and logs. The latter two directly provide habitat for insects upon which the western yellow robin feeds, while the canopy makes for cooler ground temperatures (as well as more leaf litter) that are also favorable to insects. The presence of wandoo trees (Eucalyptus wandoo) and shrubs of the genus Gastrolobium also indicates thicker leaf litter. The species also avoids parts of the woodland bordering on adjacent farmland, as these areas have a thinner layer of leaf litter. In tall jarrah-marri forest, it generally remains in the midstory of bull banksia (Banksia grandis) or understory shrubs.

== Behaviour ==
The social behaviour of the western yellow robin has been little studied. The species is usually found alone or in pairs, and less commonly in small groups—most likely a mated pair and helper birds. In autumn and winter, western yellow robins may join mixed hunting flocks with other insect-eating birds, such as Gilbert's honeyeater (Melithreptus chloropsis), western spinebill (Acanthorhynchus superciliosus), grey fantail (Rhipidura albiscapa), and thornbills (Acanthiza species).

=== Breeding ===
Breeding takes place between July and early January, most commonly between September and November. Pairs generally attempt two broods a season. The female has been observed to select the nest site. The nest is located in the fork or on a branch of a tree, usually a eucalypt, such as marri (Corymbia calophylla), jarrah (Eucalyptus marginata), and wandoo in Western Australia, or sugar gum (Eucalyptus cladocalyx) in South Australia. Other trees include snottygobble (Persoonia longifolia), native cypress (Callitris), Jacksonia, Acacia, or she-oak (Casuarinaceae). In more arid country, they may choose mallee eucalypts, bluebush (Maireana), or quandong (Santalum acuminatum). Fieldwork in the Dryandra Woodland found nests were located in the lower part of the tree canopy, so birds were able to have a clear view of the ground, and be concealed by foliage from aerial predators above.

The nest is an open cup made of strips of bark, grass, and twigs. Spider webs, dried wattle, and gum leaves are used for binding or lining. It is 7–9 cm (2 3/4–3 1/2 in) high and 5–7 cm (2–2 3/4 in) wide, with a 3–5 cm (1 1/4–2 in) wide inner cup-shaped depression. The female builds the nest and is fed by the male and helper birds during this time. Incubation is thought to be around fifteen days. The clutch generally numbers two or rarely three buffs, pale yellow or pearl-grey eggs that are irregularly marked with red-brown and are 18–22 mm long by 15–16 mm wide. The eggs are more elongated than those of the eastern yellow robin. Like all passerines, the chicks are altricial; that is, they are born blind and naked. They are fed by both parents and helpers, and the female leaves to forage for herself during this period.

The common brushtail possum (Trichosurus vulpecula) and the grey shrikethrush (Colluricincla harmonica) have been recorded preying on nestlings. The species is selected as a host for brood parasites, specifically the pallid cuckoo (Cacomantis pallidus) and the shining bronze-cuckoo (Chrysococcyx lucidus). The maximum age recorded from banding has been eight years, in a bird banded at Kodj Kodjin Reserve, Western Australia, which was caught and released at the same location in June 1994.

=== Feeding ===
Arthropods, particularly insects, form the bulk of the western yellow robin's diet, although seeds are sometimes eaten. It hunts by scanning the ground from branches or trunks of trees and pouncing on its prey mostly on the ground. One study in Dryandra Woodland found that western yellow robins caught 96% of their prey on the ground, while fieldwork in the same locale showed that they often forage near fallen logs, particularly in the warmer months. Leaf litter near logs often retains more moisture in warmer months and thus shelters more abundant prey. The foraging behavior was first described as resembling the robins of Europe, making short flights to the ground and returning to a twig or branch and seemingly incapable of sustained flight. The appearance of this behavior has been familiar to observers near frontiers of land clearing, although the roosting habits are carefully obscured.

== Conservation ==
The IUCN Red List assessed the western yellow robin in 2016 as a least-concern species, noting a large distribution range and population that, while declining, did not meet their criteria for conservation status of vulnerable to extinction. Recognized threat factors to the population trajectory of the western yellow robin are global warming, particularly severe weather events, and anthropogenic alterations that degrade or remove its habitat. The species has declined in parts of the Wheatbelt, particularly around the towns of Kellerberrin, Dowerin and Tammin, most likely due to a loss of suitable habitat. Up to 93% of suitable habitat had been cleared in the region by 2002, and much of what is left is compromised; fragmentation of habitat and livestock activity disrupt the litter layer, and Gastrolobium is often removed as it is poisonous to cattle.
