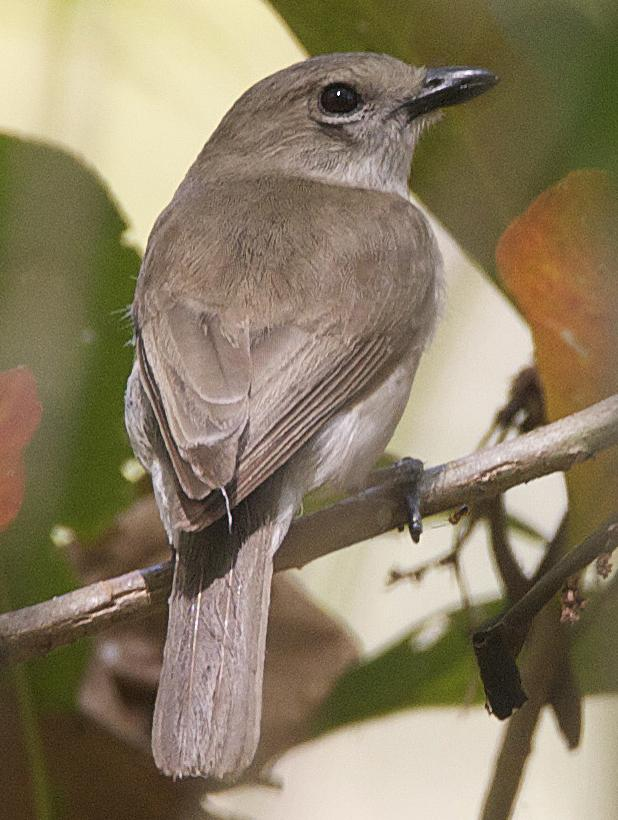

Conservation status
- Least Concern (IUCN 3.1)

Scientific classification
- Kingdom: Animalia
- Phylum: Chordata
- Class: Aves
- Order: Passeriformes
- Family: Pachycephalidae
- Genus: Pachycephala
- Species: P. simplex

Binomial name
- Pachycephala simplex Gould, 1843

Subspecies
- See text

= Grey whistler =

Species of bird

The grey whistler (Pachycephala simplex) or brown whistler, is a species of bird in the family Pachycephalidae. It is found in northern Australia and New Guinea. Its natural habitats are subtropical or tropical moist lowland forest and subtropical or tropical mangrove forest.

== Subspecies ==
Eleven subspecies are recognized:

- P. s. rufipennis – Gray, GR, 1858: Originally described as a separate species. Found on the Kai Islands (southwest of New Guinea)
- P. s. gagiensis – Stresemann & Paludan, 1932: Found on Gagi Island (northwest of New Guinea)
- P. s. waigeuensis – Mayr, 1940: Found on Waigeo and Gebe Island (west of New Guinea)
- P. s. griseiceps – Gray, GR, 1858: Originally described as a separate species. Found on western Papuan islands, Aru Islands and northwest New Guinea
- P. s. miosnomensis – Salvadori, 1879: Originally described as a separate species. Found on Meos Num (Geelvink Bay northwest of New Guinea)
- P. s. jobiensis – Meyer, AB, 1874: Found on north-central New Guinea and Yapen Island
- P. s. perneglecta – Hartert, 1930: Found on southern New Guinea
- P. s. brunnescens – Wolters, 1980: Found on southeastern New Guinea and D'Entrecasteaux Archipelago
- P. s. sudestensis – (De Vis, 1892): Originally described as a separate species in the genus Eopsaltria. Found on Louisiade Archipelago
- P. s. peninsulae – Hartert, 1899: Originally described as a separate species. Found in north-eastern Australia
- P. s. simplex – Gould, 1843: Found in northern Australia and Melville Island
