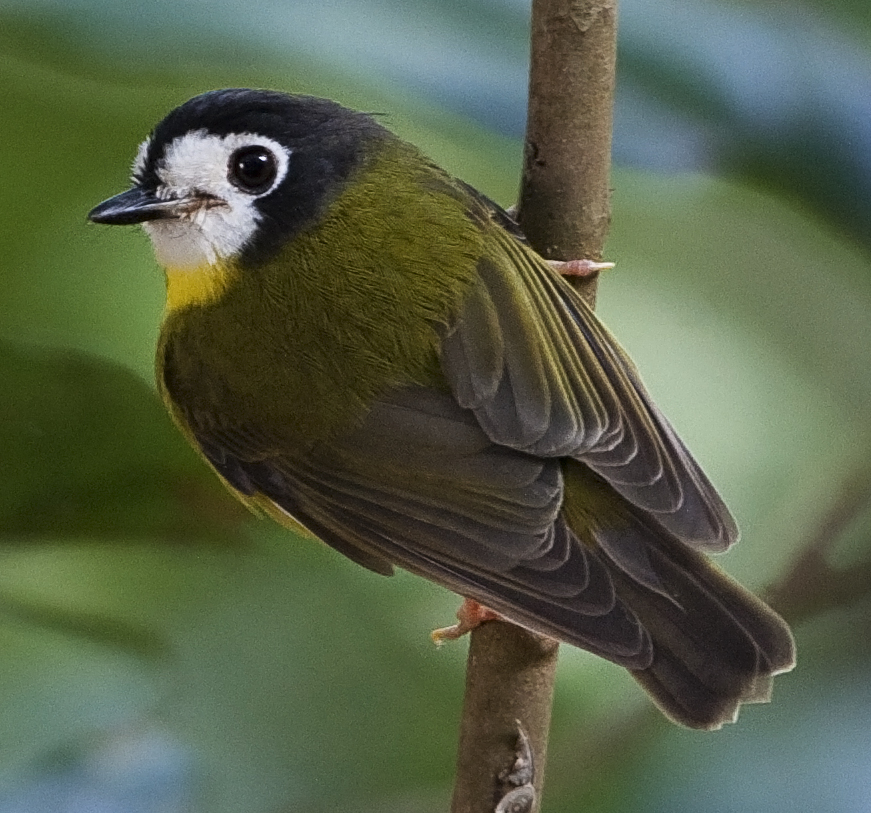

Conservation status
- Least Concern (IUCN 3.1)

Scientific classification
- Kingdom: Animalia
- Phylum: Chordata
- Class: Aves
- Order: Passeriformes
- Family: Petroicidae
- Genus: Eopsaltria
- Species: E. leucops

Binomial name
- Eopsaltria leucops (Salvadori, 1876)

Synonyms
- Tregellasia leucops

= White-faced robin =

Species of songbird native to Cape York (Australia) and New Guinea

The white-faced robin (Eopsaltria leucops) is a species of bird in the Australasian robin family Petroicidae. It is found in New Guinea and eastern Cape York Peninsula of Queensland, Australia. Its natural habitats are subtropical or tropical moist lowland forest and subtropical or tropical moist montane forest. This species was formerly placed in the genus Tregellasia.

== Taxonomy ==
The white-faced robin was formally described in 1876 as Leucophantes leucops by the Italian zoologist Tommaso Salvadori based on a specimen collected in the Arfak Mountains on the Bird's Head Peninsula of New Guinea. The specific epithet combines the Ancient Greek λευκος/leukos meaning "white" with ωψ/ōps, ωπος/ōpos meaning "face" or "eye". The white-faced robin was formerly placed in the genus Tregellasia, but based on a 2011 molecular genetic study by Les Christidis and coworkers, Tregellasia was merged into a more broadly defined Eopsaltria.

Ten subspecies are recognised:

- E. l. leucops (Salvadori, AT, 1876) – mountains of Bird's Head Peninsula (western New Guinea)
- E. l. mayri (Hartert, EJO, 1930) – New Guinea (Wandammen and Weyland mountains)
- E. l. heurni (Hartert, EJO, 1932) – New Guinea (Weyland Mountains and upper Mamberano River)
- E. l. nigroorbitalis (Rothschild, LW & Hartert, EJO, 1913) – New Guinea (Nassau and Snow mountains)
- E. l. nigriceps (Neumann, OR, 1922) – New Guinea (Victor Emanuel and Snow mountains)
- E. l. melanogenys (Meyer, AB, 1893) – northern New Guinea (Cyclops Mountains to Aicora River)
- E. l. wahgiensis (Mayr, E & Gilliard, ET, 1952) – mountains of eastern New Guinea
- E. l. albifacies (Sharpe, RB, 1882) – mountains of southeastern New Guinea
- E. l. auricularis (Mayr, E & Rand, AL, 1935) – lowlands of southern New Guinea (Orimo River region)
- E. l. albigularis (Rothschild, LW & Hartert, EJO, 1907) – northeastern Australia (northeastern Cape York Peninsula, northern Queensland)
