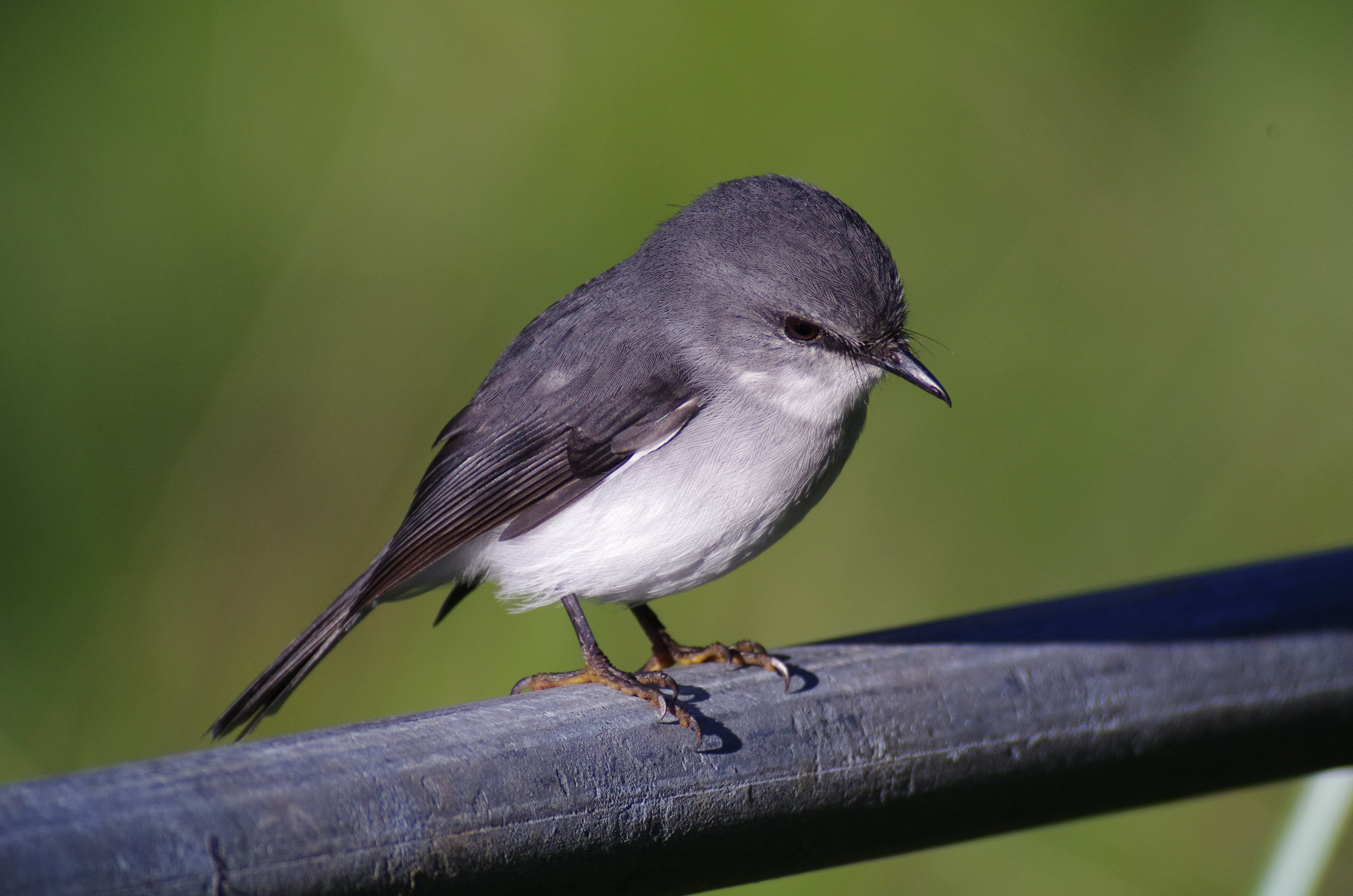
- In Western Australia

Conservation status
- Least Concern (IUCN 3.1)

Scientific classification
- Kingdom: Animalia
- Phylum: Chordata
- Class: Aves
- Order: Passeriformes
- Family: Petroicidae
- Genus: Eopsaltria
- Species: E. georgiana

Binomial name
- Eopsaltria georgiana (Quoy & Gaimard, 1832)

Synonyms
- Muscicapa georgiana Quoy & Gaimard, 1830; Eopsaltria leucogaster Gould, 1846; Eopsaltria leucogastra Gadow, 1883; Quoyornis georgianus Mathews, 1912

= White-breasted robin =

Species of songbird native to southwestern Australia

The white-breasted robin (Eopsaltria georgiana) is a passerine bird in the Australasian robin family Petroicidae. It was often previously placed in the genus Quoyornis. It is endemic to southwestern Australia. Unlike many other Australian robins, it lacks bright colours in its plumage, being a predominantly greyish bird with white underparts. Like other closely related Australasian robins, it is a cooperative breeder. It is sedentary, with pairs or small groups maintaining territories.

== Taxonomy ==
The white-breasted robin was first described by the French naturalists Jean René Constant Quoy and Joseph Paul Gaimard in 1830 as Muscicapa georgiana, (Note: Although the ornithological section of the Voyage de la corvette l'Astrolabe has 1830 on the title page, it was not published until 1832,) taking its name from the site King George Sound, where the authors had collected specimens. It was later described by John Gould in 1846 as Eopsaltria leucogaster, though as the former took precedence, its specific name remains georgiana. Australian amateur ornithologist Gregory Mathews described a paler specimen from Warren River as a distinct subspecies warreni, though this was not recognised subsequently.

The white-faced robin was formerly the only species placed in the genus Quoyornis that had been introduced by Mathews in 1912, but based on a 2011 molecular genetic study by Les Christidis and coworkers, Quoyornis was merged into a more broadly defined Eopsaltria. The species is monotypic: no subspecies are recognised.

White-breasted robin is the official name given to this species by the International Ornithologists' Union (IOC). Although, like all Australian robins, it is not closely related to either the European robin or the American robin. Gould had called it 'white-bellied robin' in 1848, and other terms used included grey-breasted or white-breasted shrike-robin from the late 19th and early 20th centuries. The 'shrike-' prefix was dropped by the RAOU in 1926. It is known as boydjil by the local indigenous people of Augusta.

== Description ==
The white-breasted robin ranges between 14.5 and 17.0 cm (5 3/4 and 6 3/4 in) long, with a wingspan of 22–25 cm (8 3/4–9 3/4 in). The male weighs 20.5 g (0.72 oz), while the female is lighter at 16.5 g (0.58 oz). Males and females are similar in coloration, with blue-grey upperparts, paler eyebrows, and whitish underparts. The grey tail is tipped with white. Bills and feet are black in colour, while eyes are dark brown. Birds from the northern part of its range are smaller and darker grey in colour. Juveniles are brownish.

== Distribution and habitat ==
The white-breasted robin is found in Western Australia south from Geraldton to the southwest corner of the continent. Within this area, it is mainly restricted to two areas of different habitat. In the main southern part of its range, it is found in an area bounded by Jarrahdale and Woorooloo on or east of the Darling Scarp, and south-east to Beaufort Inlet. Here it occurs in tall forest dominated by karri (Eucalyptus diversicolor), where it is found in dense undergrowth of such plant species as karri hazel (Trymalium odoratissimum subsp. trifidum), karri she–oak (Allocasuarina decussata), and nedik (Bossiaea aquifolium), typically along rivers and gullies. It also inhabits dry sclerophyll forest of karri, jarrah (Eucalyptus marginata), and bull banksia (Banksia grandis), where it lives in the 2–3 m high understory. The northern population is found along a narrow band from Geraldton south to Yanchep National Park, where it lives in coastal thickets—often covered in dodder—of Acacia rostellifera, Acacia cyclops, Melaleuca cardiophylla growing over sand dunes on limestone soils. It is sedentary, with pairs or small groups maintaining territories in its range.

== Behaviour ==
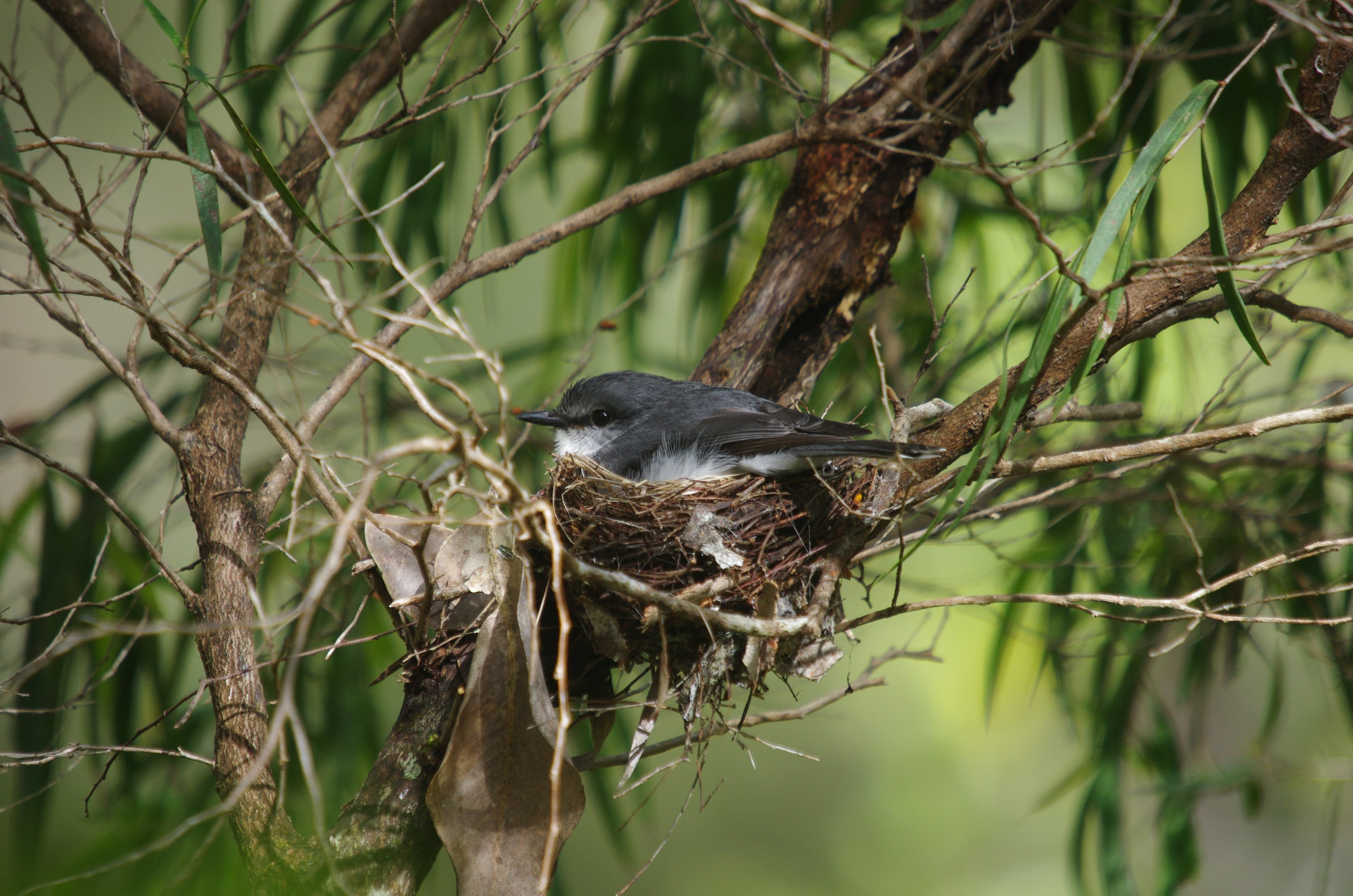
Nesting in Western Australia

The white-breasted robin is a cooperative breeder; breeding pairs are often assisted by one or more helper birds that help to raise young. Helper birds are mostly male; female birds are more likely to leave the territory in the first year of their life, while males are more likely to remain.

=== Breeding ===
Breeding season is late winter to early summer, with up to two broods raised. The nest is a neat cup made of dry grass, bark, and spider webs, generally located in a tree-fork in dense scrub, close to a watercourse. Two pale olive- to blue-green eggs, often splotched with a darker variant of the background colour, are laid. They measure 16 mm × 21 mm (0.63 in × 0.83 in), and one is often much paler than the other. Incubation lasts 16 or 17 days, with young leaving the nest two weeks after hatching.

=== Feeding ===
The white-breasted robin is insectivorous, foraging for its prey mainly on or near the ground, in or beneath undergrowth.
