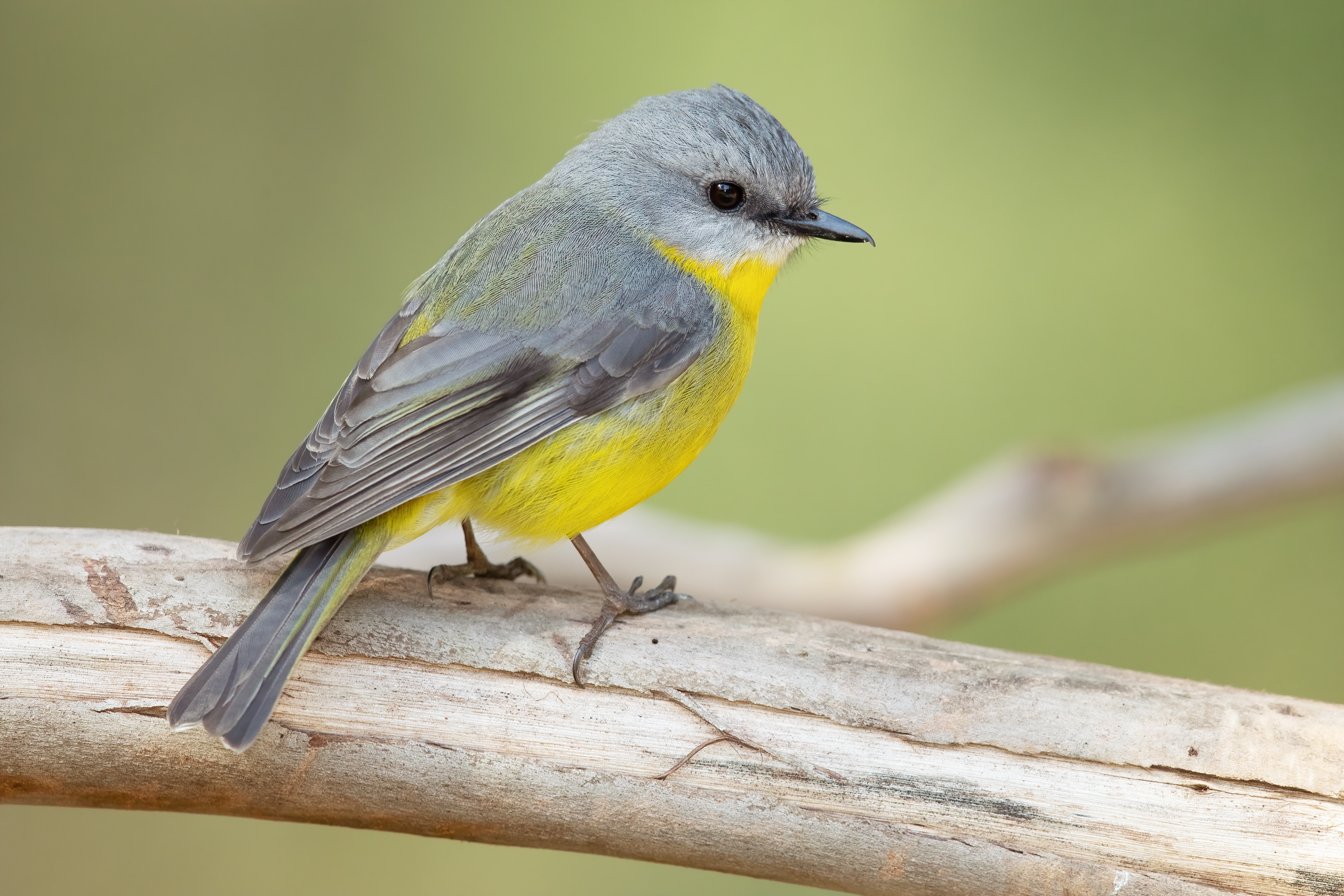
- In Yengo National Park, New South Wales

Conservation status
- Least Concern (IUCN 3.1)

Scientific classification
- Kingdom: Animalia
- Phylum: Chordata
- Class: Aves
- Order: Passeriformes
- Family: Petroicidae
- Genus: Eopsaltria
- Species: E. australis

Binomial name
- Eopsaltria australis (Shaw, 1790)

= Eastern yellow robin =

Species of songbird native to eastern Australia

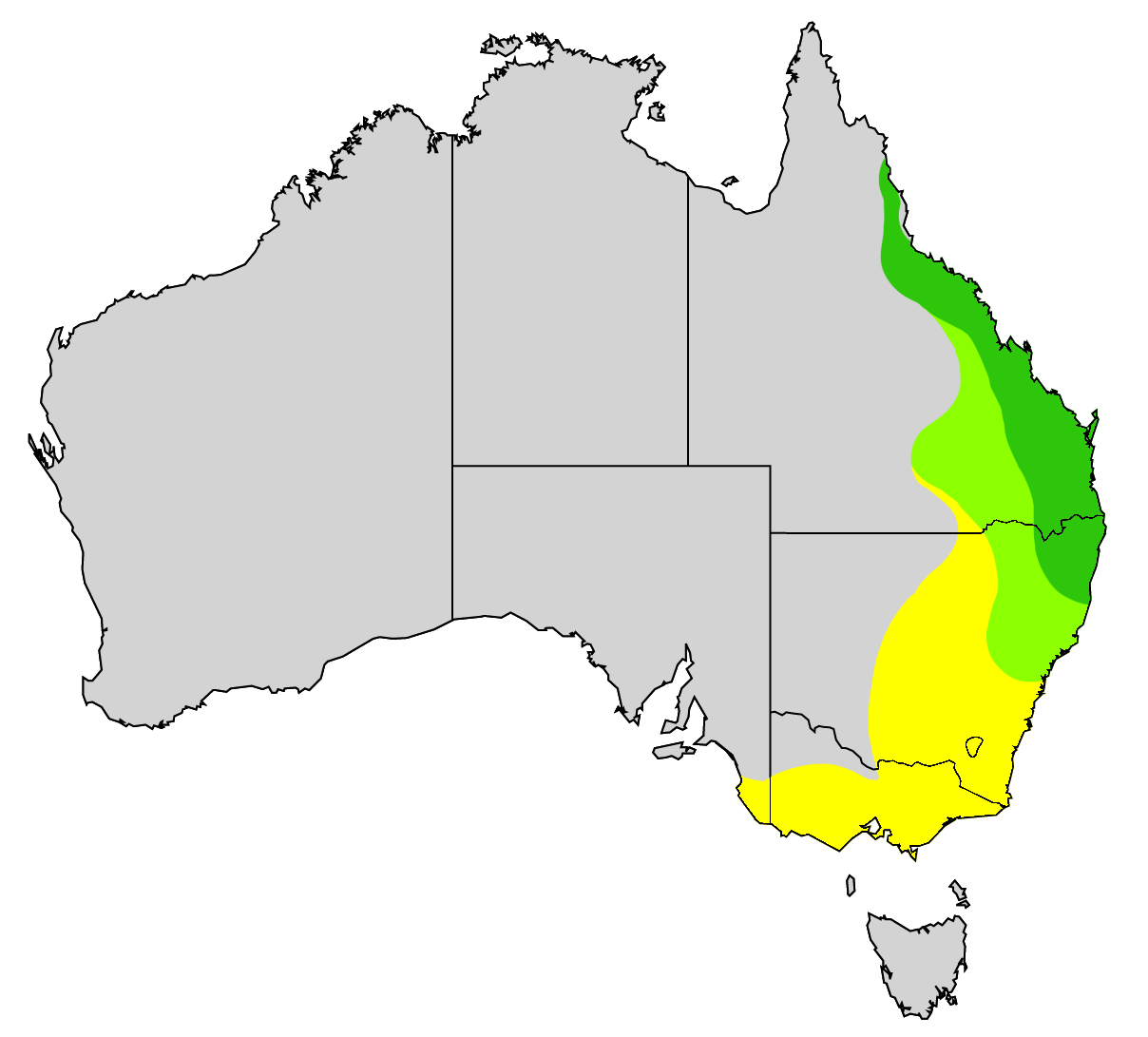
Range: subsp. chrysorrhoa in green; subsp. australis in yellow; hybrid zone in lime

The eastern yellow robin (Eopsaltria australis) is an Australasian robin of coastal and sub-coastal eastern Australia. The extent of the eastern yellow robin's residence is from the extreme southeast corner of South Australia through most of Victoria and the eastern half of New South Wales and north as far as Cooktown. Tropical Northern Queensland birds are mainly restricted to the warm heights of the Great Dividing Range.

== Taxonomy ==
The eastern yellow robin was first described by ornithologist George Shaw in 1790. Two subspecies are recognised: the northern yellow robin (subsp. chrysorrhoa) and the nominate or eastern (subsp. australis). The former was previously regarded as a separate species.

Alternatively, the eastern and western yellow robins were classified as a single species by Julian Ford in 1979 on account of similarities in calls, ecology and behaviour. Playback of one species' calls in the other's territory evoked a response. Bird taxonomist Richard Schodde did not feel that this finding warranted the lumping of the two species, but did conclude that they formed a superspecies. Two analyses of mitochondrial and nuclear DNA of Australasian robins revealed that the divergence between the eastern and western yellow robin was consistent with species-level separation, confirming their status as distinct species.

Like all Australian robins, it is not closely related to either the European robin or the American robin. It belongs to the genus Eopsaltria, whose Australian members are known colloquially as "yellow robins", as distinct from the "red robins" of the genus Petroica.

== Description ==
At 15 to 16 cm (6 in) in length and 15 to 28 g (0.03 to 0.06 lb), the eastern yellow robin is one of the larger Australasian robins, and one of the most easily observed. Pairs and small family parties establish a territory—sometimes year-round, sometimes for a season—and seem little disturbed by human presence. They appear not to migrate any great distance, but will make local movements with the seasons, particularly to higher and lower ground.

== Distribution and habitat ==
The eastern yellow robin occupies a wide range of habitats: heaths, mallee, acacia scrub, woodlands, and sclerophyll forests, but is most often found in damper places or near water. Like all Australian robins, the eastern yellow robin tends to inhabit fairly dark, shaded locations, and is a perch and pounce hunter, typically from a tree trunk, wire, or low branch. Its diet includes a wide range of small creatures, mostly insects. Breeding takes place in the spring and, as with many Australian birds, is often communal. The nest is a neat cup made of fine plant material and spider web, usually placed in a fork, and expertly disguised with lichen, moss, bark, or leaves.

== Gallery ==
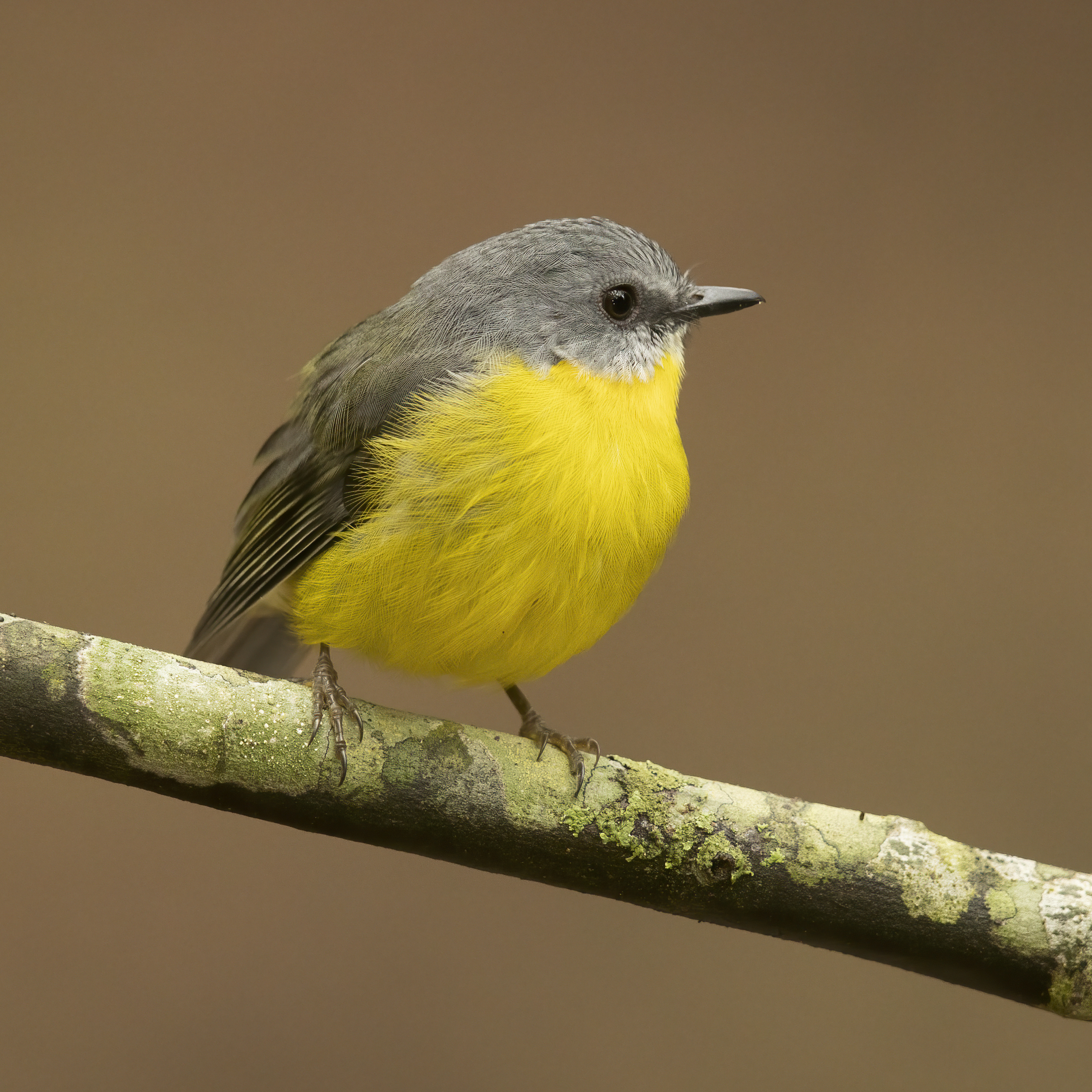
In Brunkerville, New South Wales

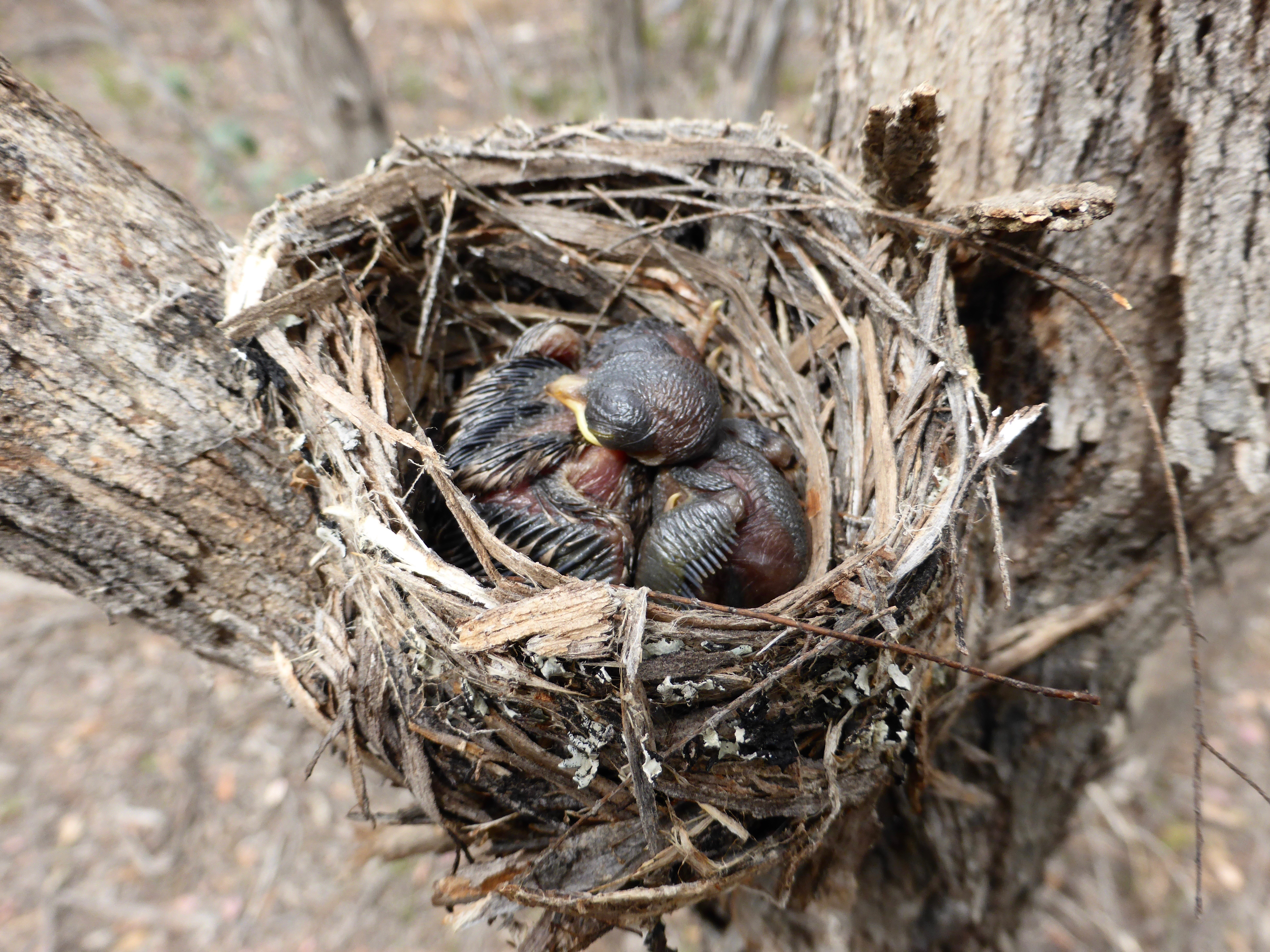
Chicks in nest, central Victoria

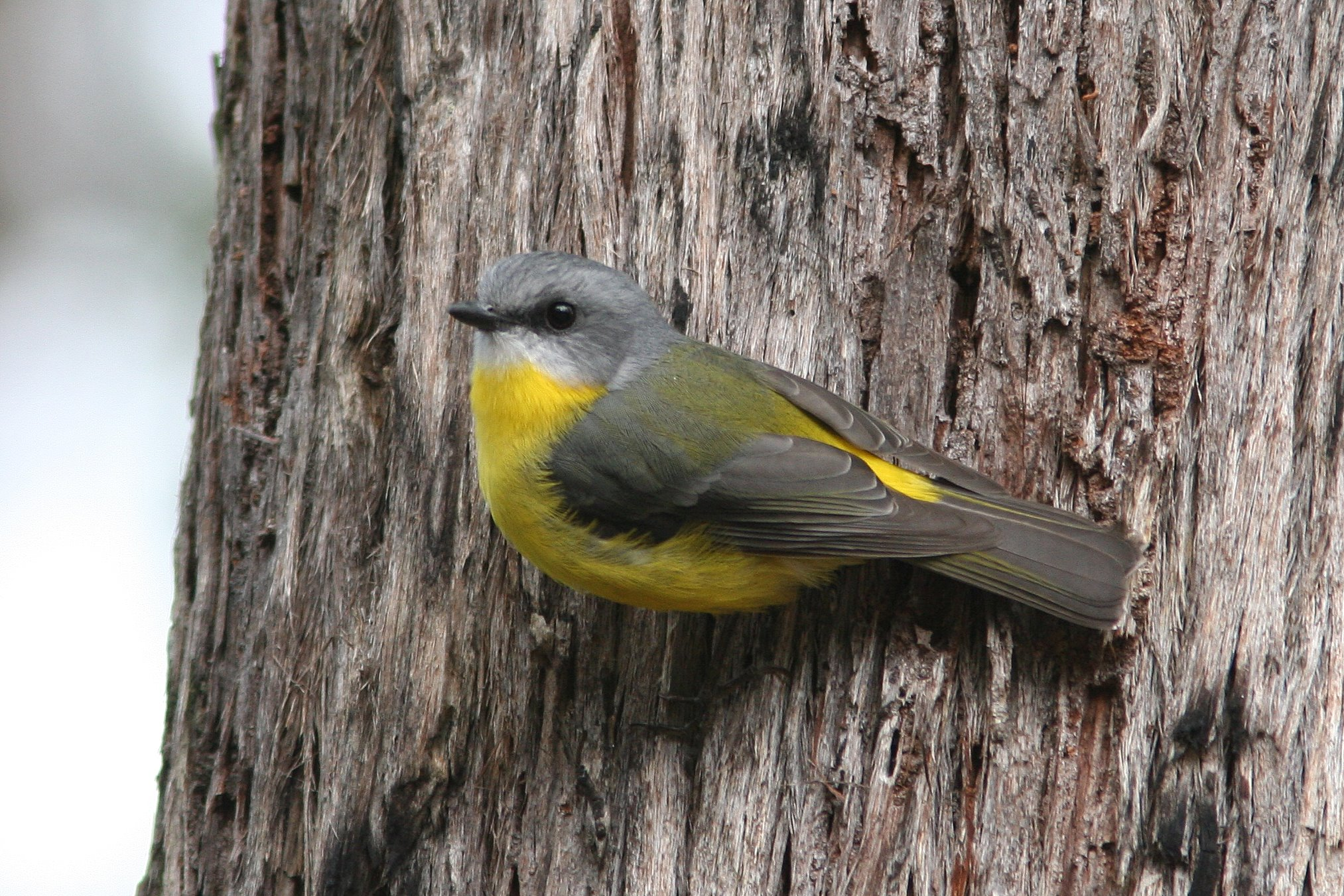
Gibraltar Range National Park, New South Wales
