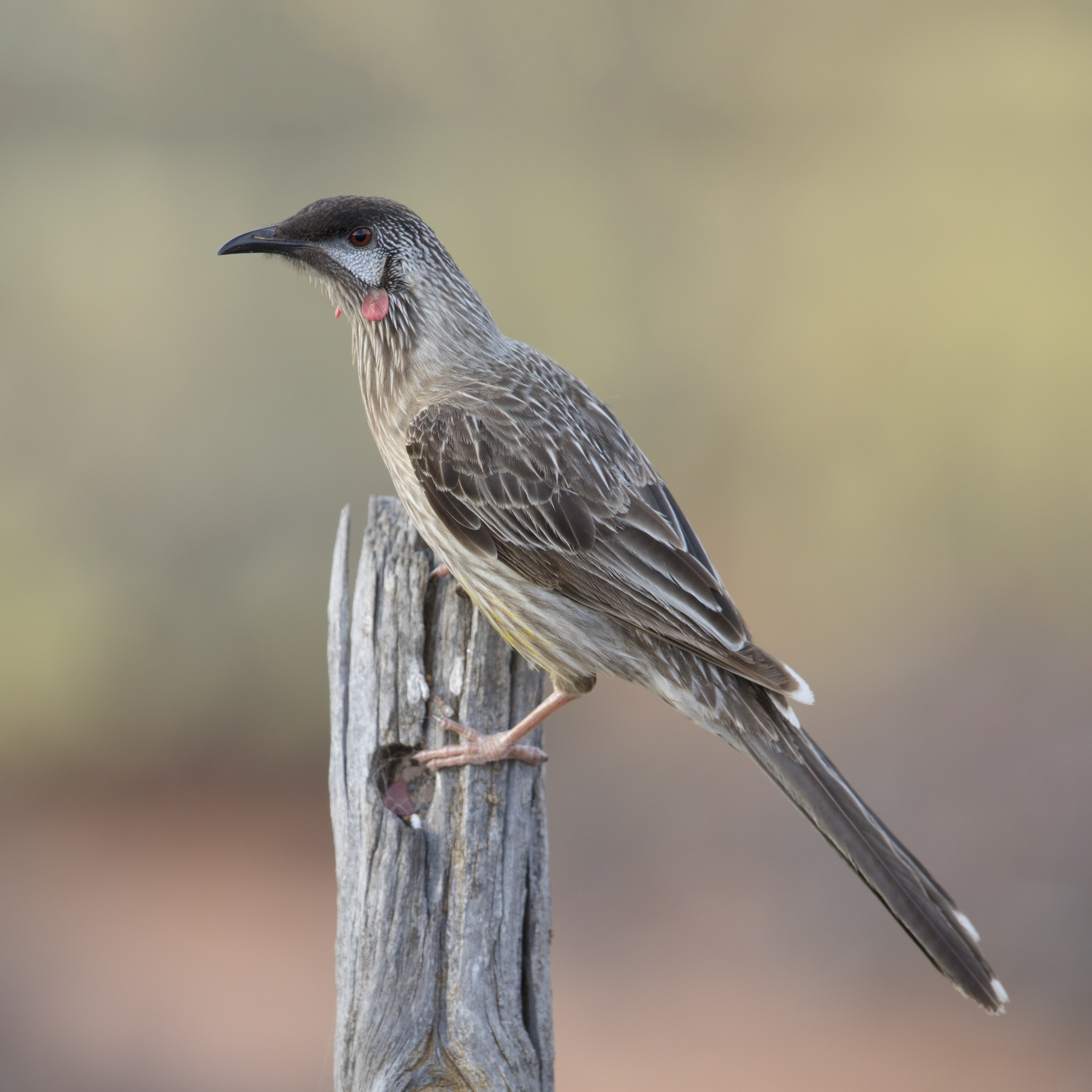

Conservation status
- Least Concern (IUCN 3.1)

Scientific classification
- Kingdom: Animalia
- Phylum: Chordata
- Class: Aves
- Order: Passeriformes
- Family: Meliphagidae
- Genus: Anthochaera
- Species: A. carunculata

Binomial name
- Anthochaera carunculata (Shaw, 1790)
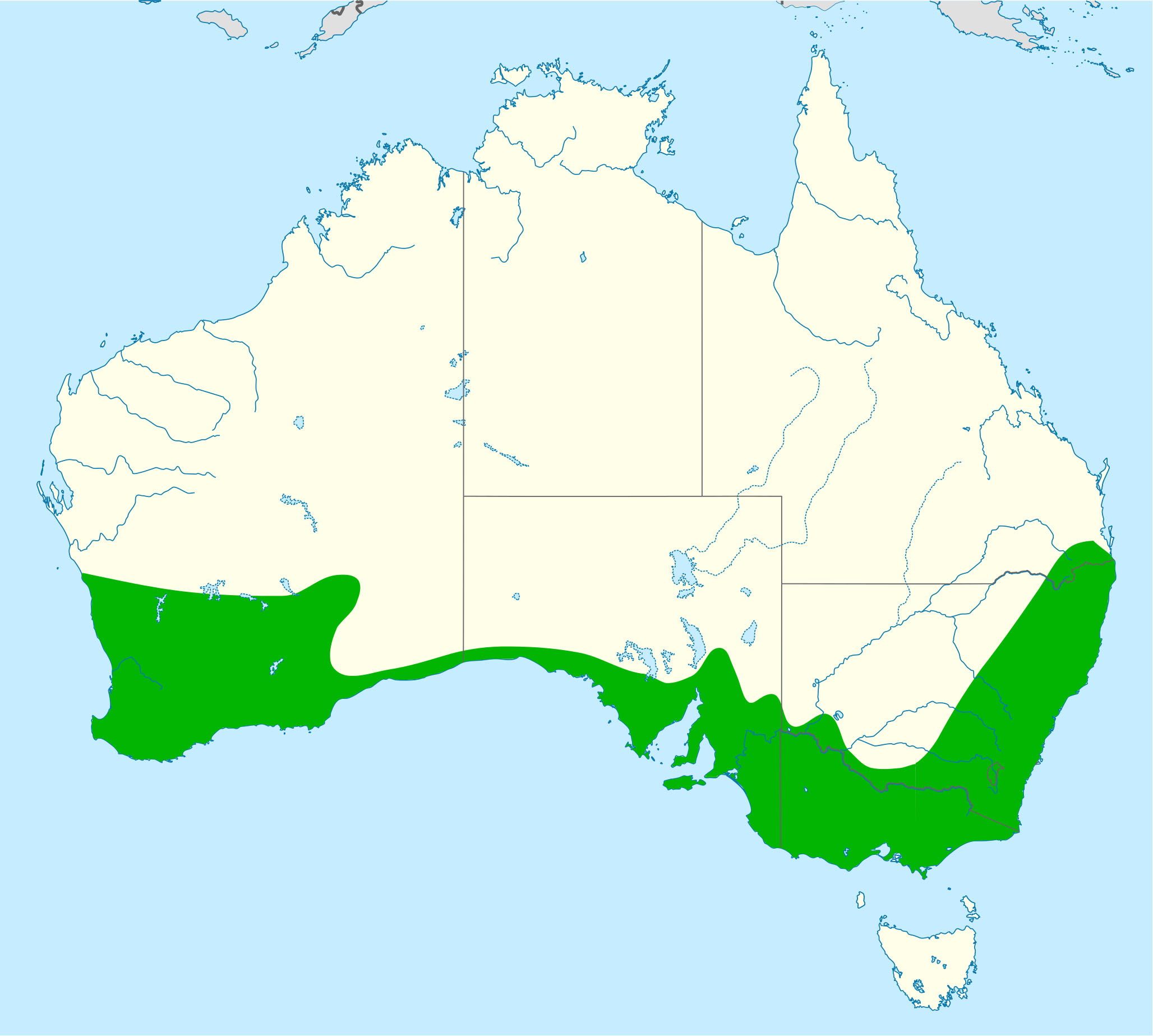
- Distribution map of the red wattlebird

= Red wattlebird =

Passerine bird native to southern Australia

The red wattlebird (Anthochaera carunculata) is a passerine bird native to southern Australia. At 33–37 cm (13–14 1/2 in) in length, it is the second largest species of Australian honeyeater, after the yellow wattlebird. It has mainly grey-brown plumage, with red eyes, distinctive pinkish-red wattles on either side of the neck, white streaks on the chest and a large bright yellow patch on the lower belly. The sexes are similar in plumage. Juveniles have less prominent wattles and browner eyes. John White described the red wattlebird in 1790. Three subspecies are recognized.

The species is found in southeast Queensland, New South Wales, Victoria, South Australia and southwest Western Australia in open forest and woodland, and is a common visitor to urban gardens and parks. Loud and conspicuous, the red wattlebird is generally found in trees, where it gets most of its food; occasionally it forages on the ground. It is one of the largest nectarivorous birds in the world, feeding from a wide variety of flowering plants. Insects also comprise part of its diet. It is territorial and at times aggressive towards birds of other species, often defending rich sources of nectar. Breeding throughout its range, the red wattlebird builds a cup-shaped nest in a tree and raises one or two broods a year. Although it has declined in places from land-clearing, it is classified as Least Concern on the IUCN Red List.

== Taxonomy ==
The red wattlebird was first described as the wattled bee-eater by the Irish surgeon and naturalist John White in his Journal of a Voyage to New South Wales, which was published in 1790. He wrote that it was the "size of a missel thrush, but much larger in proportion". The taxonomic descriptions in White's book are believed to have been written by the English naturalist George Shaw, who is generally credited as the author by subsequent authorities. The specific epithet, carunculata, was introduced later in the same year by John Latham. The word is derived from caruncula, Latin for 'a small piece of flesh'. Both Shaw and Latham assigned the red wattlebird to the genus Merops. The species was moved to Anthochaera in 1827 by the naturalists Nicholas Aylward Vigors and Thomas Horsfield. The generic name derives from the Ancient Greek anthos 'flower, bloom' and khairō 'enjoy'.

"Red wattlebird" has been designated as the official common name for the species by the International Ornithologists' Union (IOC). Other common names include gillbird, gilly warbler, barkingbird, muttonbird, butcherbird, what's o clock, and chock. Unlike many species in southwestern Australia, the red wattlebird was given names by the local indigenous people that were onomatopoeic (sounding like the calls they make). Names recorded include wodjalok, durdal, doongorok, and djoongong (this last name is also applied to the western wattlebird). In the Eyre Peninsula in South Australia, the local Barngarla people knew it as ngarkarko or ngarkabukko. The local people of Denial Bay in South Australia called it noggal, and the Ngarrindjeri people of the Lower Murray region in South Australia know it as rungkan.

There are three recognised subspecies, though there is a zone of intermediate birds across western Victoria and eastern South Australia, bordered by western Port Phillip Bay to the east, Mount Lofty Ranges to the west, and Little and Big Desert national parks to the north. The differences in plumage are not generally prominent enough to be noticeable in the field.

- A. c. carunculata (Shaw, 1790) – found in southeast Australia, namely Victoria, eastern New South Wales, and southeastern Queensland.
- A. c. clelandi (Mathews, 1923) – Kangaroo Island (South Australia). Of a similar size to the nominate subspecies, it tends to have darker plumage, a longer bill, and shorter tarsus.
- A. c. woodwardi Mathews, 1912 – southwest and south-central Australia, west of the Mount Lofty Ranges. This subspecies is a little smaller than the nominate subspecies and has shorter wings. Its plumage is similar, though the yellow patch on the belly is more prominent.

Analysis of DNA showed that the closest relative of the red wattlebird is the yellow wattlebird of Tasmania, the pair splitting from the ancestor of the regent honeyeater—their next closest relative. Honeyeaters are related to the Pardalotidae (pardalotes), Acanthizidae (Australian warblers, scrubwrens, thornbills, etc.), and Maluridae (Australian fairy-wrens) in the large superfamily Meliphagoidea.

== Description ==
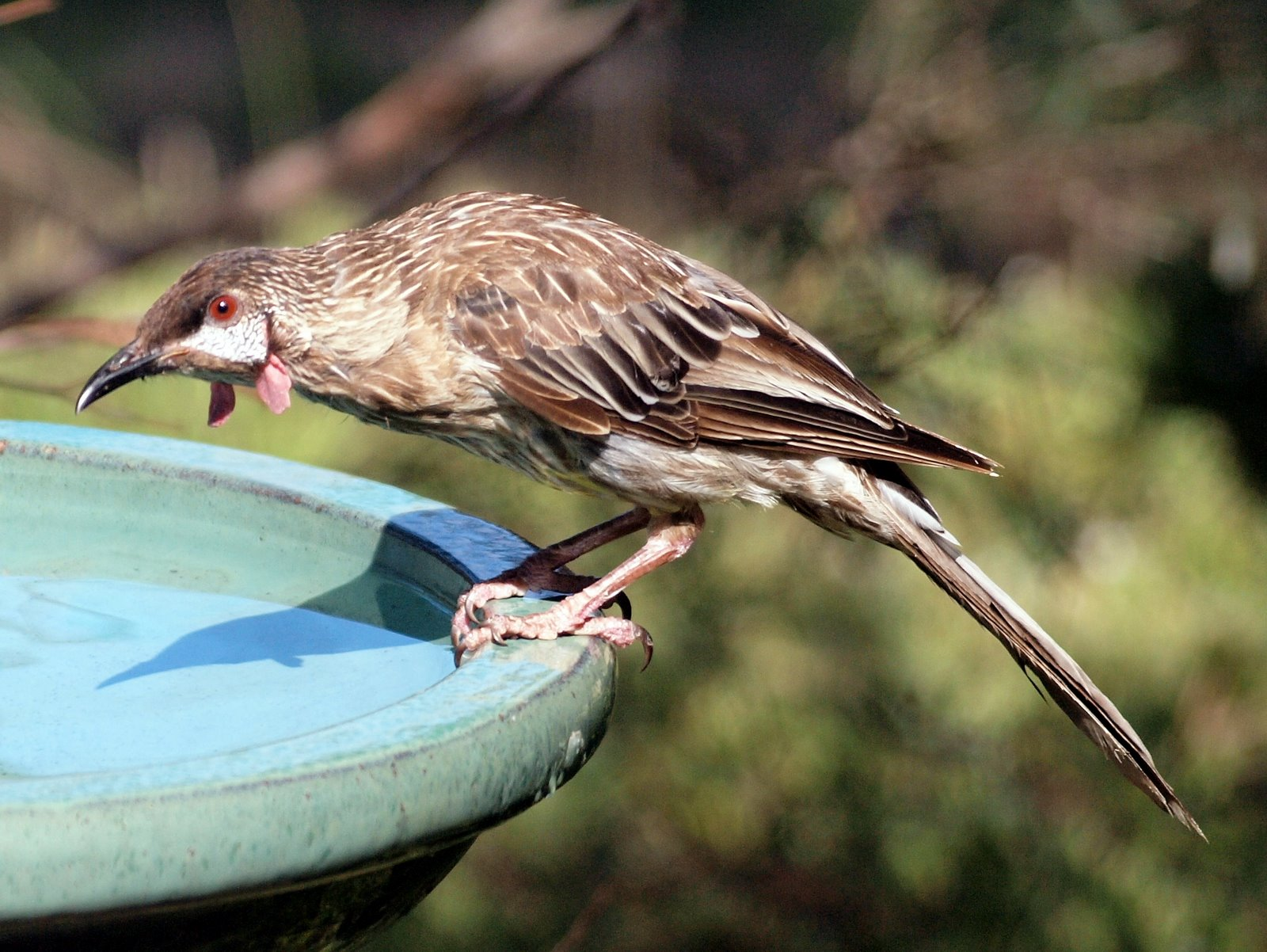
At a bird bath in Canberra, with wattles easily visible

The sexes of the red wattlebird are similar in size and plumage, the length of the adult male ranging from 33 to 37 centimetres (13 to 15 in) and the adult female from 34 to 37 centimetres (13 to 15 in). With an average weight of 100–120 grams (3.5–4.2 oz), the red wattlebird is one of the largest nectar-feeding birds in the world, and the second largest species of honeyeater native to Australia, eclipsed only by the yellow wattlebird. The crown, forehead and upper lores (area between the eyes and nostrils) are dark brown, streaked with pale brown at the front of the crown and white at the rear of the crown. The nape (back of the neck) is slightly paler brown, with white streaks. A whitish triangular marking covers the lower lores and anterior ear covert feathers, bordered below by a dark brown stripe from the lower mandible down to the wattle and around to behind the eye. The throat is dark brown streaked with white. The iris of the eye is orange-red to crimson. The distinctive pinkish-red wattles dangle from the lower rear corner of the ear coverts on either side of the neck, and there is a sliver of pink bare skin at the lower border of the white patch on the face. The chest and belly are streaked white, and there is a bright yellow patch towards the tail. The strong legs and feet are pink or pinkish-brown, and the downward-curving bill is black. The average dimensions of the bill are 23.5 millimetres (0.93 in) long, 6.7 millimetres (0.26 in) wide, and 6.8 millimetres (0.27 in) high at its base. The gape is grey-black, while the inside of the mouth is orange. In common with other honeyeaters, the red wattlebird has a long, specialized tongue to extract nectar from flowers. The tongue can extend well beyond the tip of the bill, and is divided at the end to form a brush-like structure with over a hundred bristles that soak up nectar by capillary action.

The red wattlebird begins moulting after the breeding season, starting with the primary flight feathers in November or December, and finishing between the following March and May. The feathers of the breast, back, median and lesser covert feathers are moulted before those of the crown, remiges, and rectrices.

Immature red wattlebirds are generally less flamboyant. Juveniles have much less prominent wattles, brown irises, a pale crown, and much less yellow on the belly. They moult into first immature plumage within a few months of leaving the nest. First immature birds are more similar to adults overall, having red irises with brown rings, wattles larger but still smaller than adults, and a greyish pink gape.

The red wattlebird is hard to confuse with any other species, though in poor visibility it might be mistaken for the spiny-cheeked honeyeater, or little or western wattlebirds.

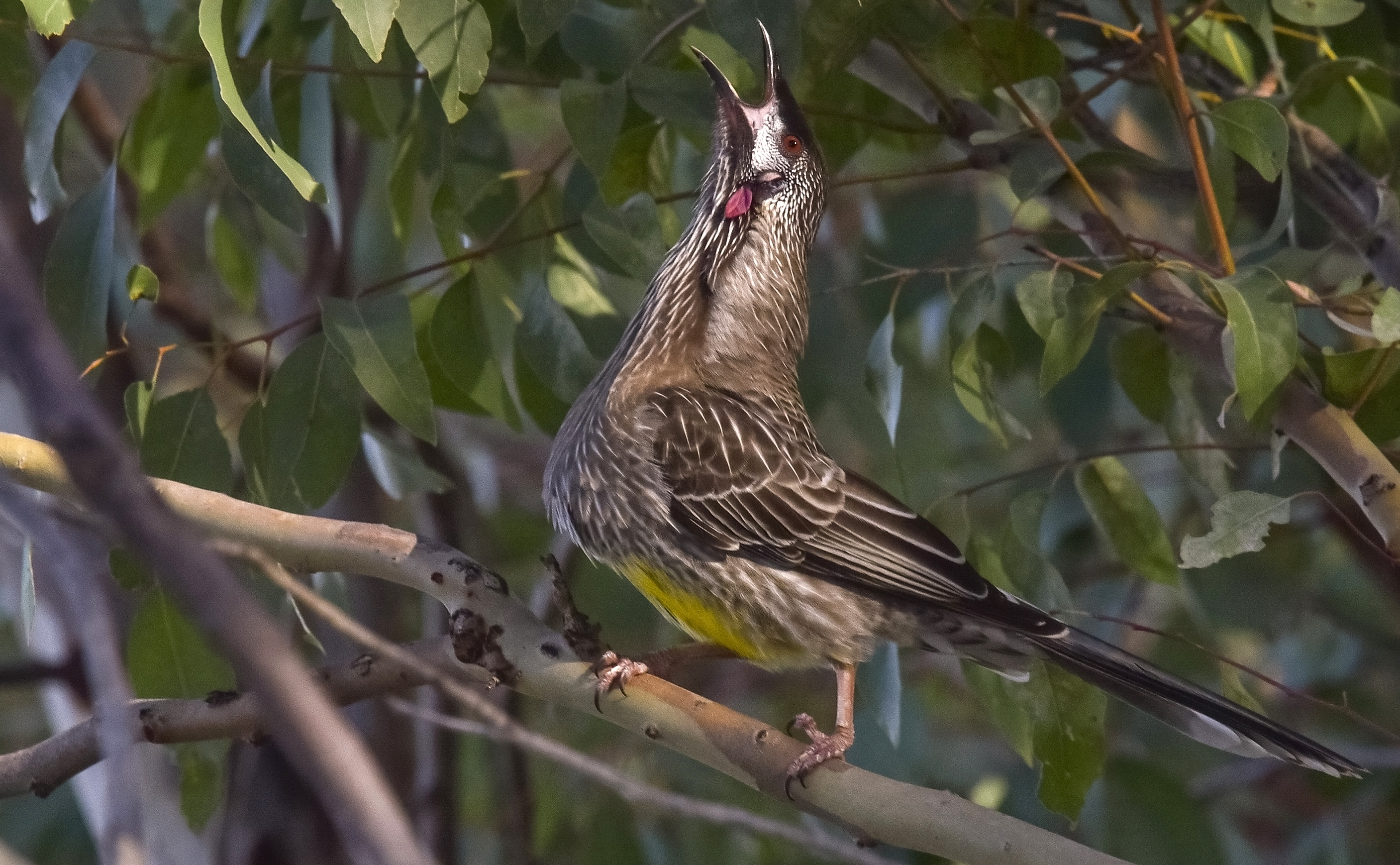
Red wattlebird

=== Call ===
Red wattlebirds are noisy animals, producing a range of raucous calls. Pairs of birds appear to duet, particularly at food sources, with the male producing a loud cackle and the female a whistling call. The male's cackle is loudest between 1 and 3 kHz frequency. A guttural-sounding call, it has been variously described as having a squawking, coughing or hiccuping sound. Males cackle when foraging by themselves, when with other birds, or when declaring their territory to other birds. The whistling call consists of up to five rapid whistles that may or may not ascend in tone, and are repeated 3–4 times. Both sexes commonly utter a single chock note that may be harsh and guttural or have 4–5 harmonics. This is thought to be a contact call. These calls all carry over long distances.

Red wattlebirds utter two types of alarm calls, alternating between them while mobbing other animals. One is a harsh call over a wide frequency (1.3 to 5.9 kHz) that is louder at lower frequencies. The other is a lower-pitched staccato call with a frequency of 1.1–2.2 kHz. They give a harsh call when trying to distract intruders from the vicinity of the nest or when picked up, often trying to flap or peck the handler.

== Distribution and habitat ==
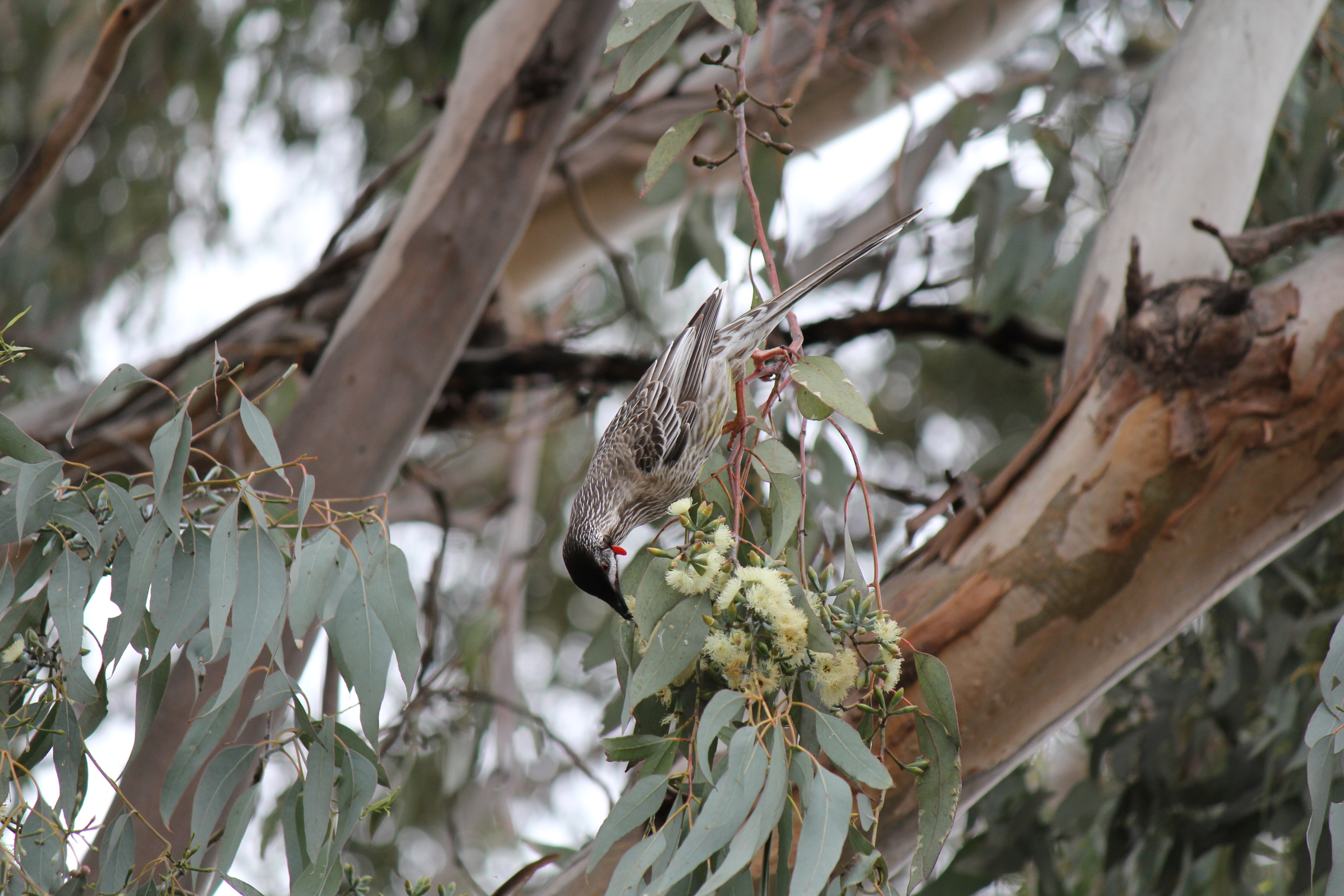
Adult feeding on grey box (Eucalyptus microcarpa) flowers

The red wattlebird is found in southeast Queensland, where it occurs south of Noosa and Cooloola, becoming more common south of Brisbane and Toowoomba. Further south into New South Wales it is found most places east of (and including) the Great Dividing Range and stretching west to the southern North-West Plain, Central Western Slopes and eastern Riverina, and is an occasional visitor to points along the Murray River valley. It is found across Victoria, though is uncommon in the northwest of the state. In South Australia, Devonborough Downs Station, Manunda, Wilpena Pound and Nullarbor Station mark the northern limits of its range. There are scattered records from the Nullarbor Plain, but the species is common in Western Australia west of 125 °E and south of 29 °S. The yellow wattlebird replaces it in Tasmania. The red wattlebird has become more common in some localities, such as the Sunraysia district in the 1960s, and Nambucca Heads and Lefevre Peninsula in the 1980s. Breeding numbers have increased in Sydney and Adelaide. The red wattlebird is a rare vagrant to New Zealand, with confirmed records at Matakana in 1865 and Rohutu, Taranaki, in 1885, and a third unconfirmed report from Motupiko in 1938.

The red wattlebird appears to be a permanent resident in much of its range, though its movements are poorly known. It appears to be partly migratory in Western Australia and the north coast of New South Wales. In southeastern New South Wales and the Australian Capital Territory, it appears to move to lower altitudes for winter. For instance, birds vacate the Brindabella Range over the cooler months. Overall, little pattern is discernible in the species' movements, though red wattlebirds appear to move to feed on populations of flowering banksias and eucalypts, such as winter-flowering banksias in Perth over the cooler months. Large numbers arrive in time to feed on flowering native apples (Angophora) in Mudgee and Cobbora districts in central-western New South Wales, and on white box (Eucalyptus albens) at Barrington in central-northern New South Wales. A mainly resident population on the Swan Coastal Plain near Perth is supplemented during winter by more arriving from inland areas. South of Perth, red wattlebirds are more locally nomadic, moving to new patches of blooming wildflowers. East of Perth in areas around Kellerberrin, Kwolyin, and Nangeenan, the red wattlebird is present from late autumn to spring, breeding in August and September. Around Lake Grace, the red wattlebird is present year-round.

Open sclerophyll forest and woodland, generally dominated by eucalypts, is the most common habitat of the species. It is more common in forests with ample shrubby or grassy understory. It is less commonly encountered in shrubland, heath, or margins of wet sclerophyll forest. It is rarely found in mature pine plantations. Within urban areas, it is abundant in parks and reserves, gardens and golf courses, as well as orchards and vineyards. It occasionally ventures into subtropical, semi-arid or subalpine regions, and has been found up to 1,900 m (6,000 ft) above sea level. The red wattlebird is rarer in forests that have been affected by dieback (infection by the pathogen Phytophthora cinnamomi).

== Behaviour ==
A loud and active bird, the red wattlebird is found in pairs, in a small family group, or alone during the breeding season, and gathers in larger groups of up to several hundred birds over winter. It flies straight or with a slightly undulating pattern, alternating between gliding and flapping its wings with quick shallow beats, at or slightly above the level of the tree canopy. The red wattlebird moves on the ground by hopping, cocking its tail upwards slightly.

Aggressive and territorial, the red wattlebird defends its nest and sources of food against other birds. It either calls at, snaps at the tails of, or flies at other birds, sometimes scuffling with members of the same species or other large honeyeaters in the air. Displacement is a dominant display in which a red wattlebird will land on a perch that has been immediately vacated by another bird. A smaller red wattlebird adopts a horizontal appeasement posture side-on to the aggressor in which it lowers its head, flutters its wings and edges closer to the other bird.

As well as smaller bird species, red wattlebirds can mob and chase larger species, such as the Australian magpie (Gymnorhina tibicen), butcherbirds, currawongs, the black-faced cuckooshrike (Coracina novaehollandiae), the olive-backed oriole (Oriolus sagittatus), crows, ravens, the laughing kookaburra (Dacelo novaeguineae), and even small raptors like the collared sparrowhawk (Accipiter cirrocephalus).

=== Breeding ===
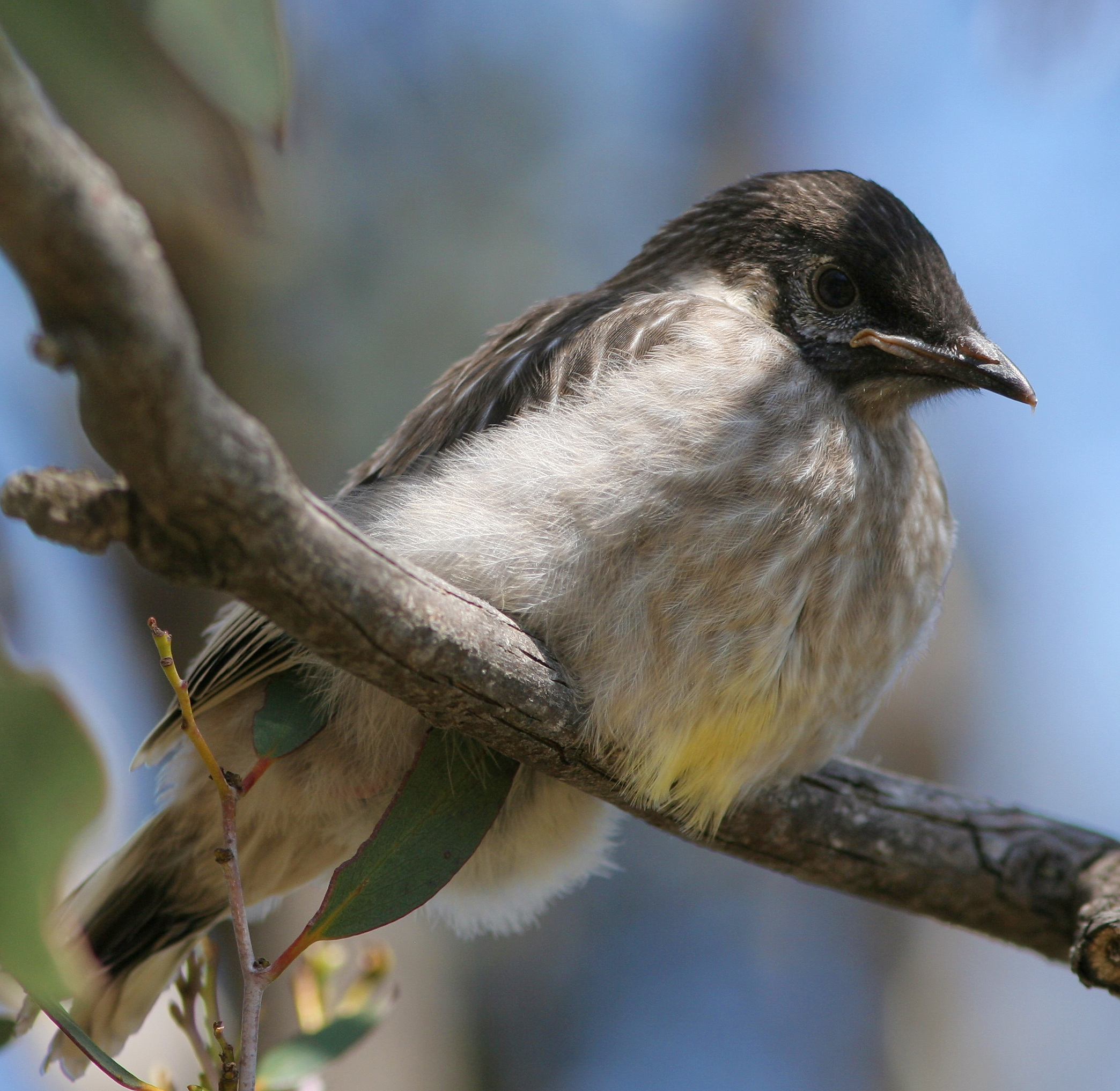
Chick, Victoria

The red wattlebird breeds throughout its range, with nesting taking place between July and December, though occasionally outside these months, if conditions are favourable. One or two broods are laid each year.

Red wattlebirds generally nest as solitary pairs. The nest is a cup-shaped structure formed from sticks and leaves, lined with bark, grass, and hair, between 2 and 16 metres (7 and 50 ft) above ground, usually in the forked branches of a tree—generally a eucalypt. The nest is usually located centrally rather than on the periphery of a tree. A study in Eastwood State Forest, near Armidale in New South Wales, found that red wattlebirds preferred to nest in manna gum (Eucalyptus viminalis) and apple box (E. bridgesiana).

A clutch of two or three pale brown- and lavender-spotted pinkish eggs are normally laid. They measure 33 mm × 22 mm (1 1/4 in × 7/8 in), and are a tapered oval in shape. The eggs are normally incubated by both parents, but sometimes just by the female. They hatch after 16–21 days. The chicks are born almost naked, with a small amount of grey down on their head and body. They are mostly brooded by the female, but sometimes the male will also brood. The nestlings are fed by both parents, and occasionally immature birds will contribute. Their eyes open at around 7 days. They fledge 15–20 days after hatching, and both parents continue to feed them for a further 2–3 weeks. Young are given manna (crystallised plant sap) and insects, such as beetles, bugs, and flies.

=== Feeding ===
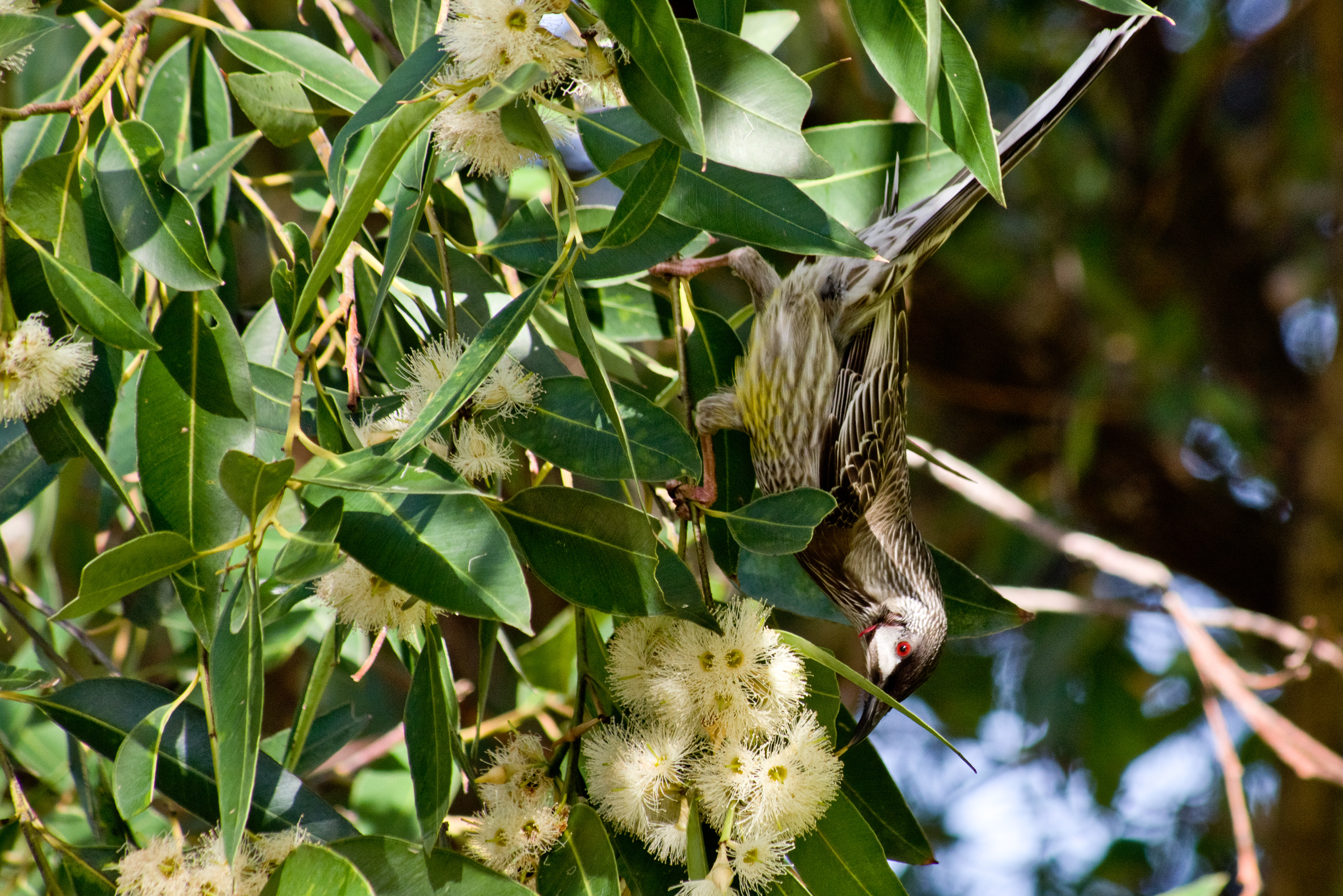
Subspecies woodwardii feeding on eucalypt in Perth

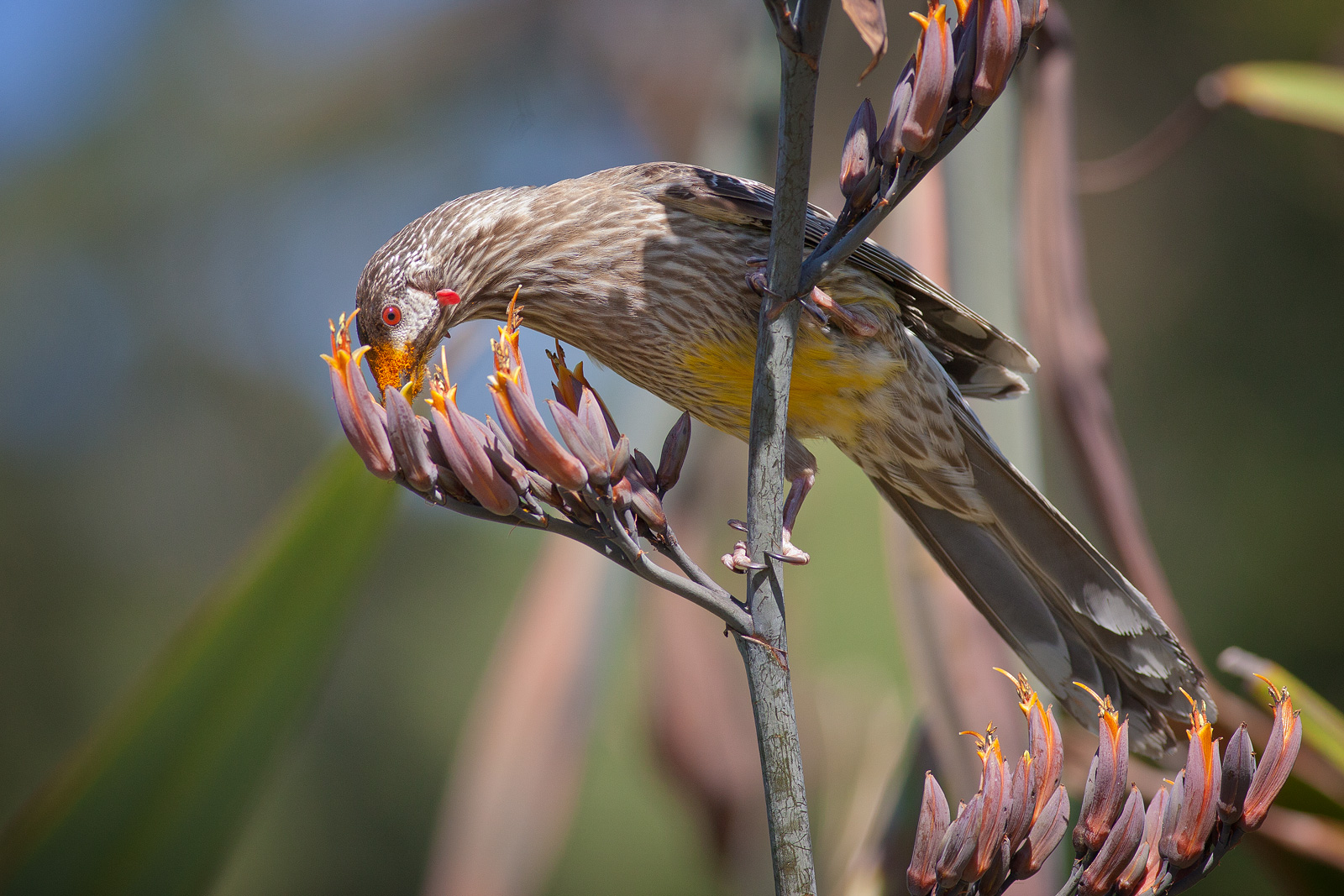
Subspecies carunculata feeding on exotic flowers in Melbourne

The red wattlebird is predominantly a nectar-feeder, foraging mostly in trees; in particular, climbing along branches (rather than the trunk) and probing flower-heads with its bill. One study in Bondi State Forest in southern New South Wales revealed that the species foraged at a height of 5.9 ± 5.8 m (19 ± 19 ft). They seldom look for food on the ground, though do so to feed on shrubs such as the cats paw (Anigozanthos humilis). The red wattlebird prioritises visiting flowers that produce a lot of nectar, such as those of eucalypts, banksias, grasstrees (Xanthorrhoea), and emu bushes (Eremophila). It often prefers plants with easy access to nectar, rather than those with tubular flowers (and thus difficult-to-access nectar). The red wattlebird seeks out yellow flower-heads of holly-leaved banksia (Banksia ilicifolia), which have much higher nectar content than the more mature red flower-heads. The species forages much more often in native than exotic plants, though the introduced coral tree (Erythrina) is popular. In addition to nectar, it takes insects and other small creatures, usually by hawking, and it also feeds on berries and other fruit. A field study in the Mount Lofty Ranges found that it spent twice as much time feeding on nectar compared to insects.

One field study found that red wattlebirds foraged for longer periods when nectar concentrations in flowers were low, and consumed fewer insects at this time. However, this could have been because the temperature was lower and hence insects were less active. In Gingin, Western Australia, 97% of red wattlebirds at a site of two mixed kangaroo paw species were observed feeding on a single species at its peak flowering: cats paw in August and red-and-green kangaroo paw (A. manglesii) in September, with very few visits to the other species or hybrids.

In central New South Wales, the red wattlebird forages more often on the foliage of the grey gum (Eucalyptus punctata) over other trees, though it does also show some preference for narrow-leaved ironbark (E. crebra), if grey gum is not present. Red wattlebirds tend to oust noisy friarbirds (Philemon corniculatus) where both species are present. The red wattlebird often forages alongside the New Holland honeyeater (Phylidonyris novaehollandiae), little friarbird (P. citreogularis), western and little wattlebirds, rainbow lorikeet (Trichoglossus moluccanus), purple-crowned lorikeet (Glossopsitta porphyrocephala), satin bowerbird (Ptilonorhynchus violaceus), pied currawong (Strepera graculina), and crimson rosella (Platycercus elegans), though they generally chase other nectar-feeding birds away from a horde of eucalypt flowers.

A field study, conducted in winter 1978 on Kangaroo Island, found red wattlebirds to be territorial around a rich source of nectar, namely a large cup gum (Eucalyptus cosmophylla), driving off smaller honeyeaters. This indicated that the species would exclude other species, if food was scarce. In New England National Park, red wattlebirds would be more aggressive when there were moderate amounts of nectar in groves of flowering banksias, but were less so at lean or abundant times.

The red wattlebird has a brush-tipped tongue, with a 17 mm (5/8 in) long segment bearing around 120 individual bristles. It feeds by placing the bill in a flower and inserting the tongue into its nectar chamber, drawing the nectar up by capillary action. The bristles increase the surface area of the tongue available for the uptake of nectar.

== Predators and parasites ==
The nests of red wattlebirds are often parasitized by the pallid cuckoo (Cacomantis pallidus), and less commonly by the Pacific koel (Eudynamys orientalis). Nest predators include the brown goshawk (Accipiter fasciatus), black falcon (Falco subniger), pied currawong (Strepera graculina), Australian raven (Corvus coronoides), common brushtail possum (Trichosurus vulpecula), domestic cat, and snakes.

Isospora anthochaerae is an Apicomplexan parasite that has been isolated from the red wattlebird in Western Australia, from oocytes collected from faecal samples. Species of bird louse that have been recorded on the red wattlebird include Menacanthus eurysternus, and members of the genera Brueelia, Myrsidea and Philopterus.

== Interactions with people ==
Red wattlebirds are adversely impacted by land and undergrowth clearing, and have vanished from some habitats thus altered. Despite this, they are classified as Least Concern on the IUCN Red List, as they occur over a wide range, have a large population, and the population decline is not rapid. Red wattlebirds are regularly killed by cats and dogs, as well as being hit by cars on roads. In 1924 in northern Victoria, the red wattlebird was described as very wary, on account of being highly regarded (and shot) for its meat. Indeed, it was shot widely for food or sport, or because it was held to be a pest of vineyards or orchards. On occasion, red wattlebirds have raided vineyards and orchards for grapes, stone fruit, figs, olives, loquats, apples, pears, and berries, which they puncture and extract the juice or flesh from.

The red wattlebird has been kept as an aviary bird in Sydney. It is not difficult to look after, but can be very aggressive to other cage birds. Grevillea 'Robyn Gordon' is a useful companion shrub as it bears flowers all year round.

== Cited texts ==
- Beruldsen, Gordon (2003). Australian Birds: Their Nests and Eggs. Kenmore Hills, Queensland: Self-published. ISBN 978-0-646-42798-0.
- Ford, Hugh A. (2001). "Family Meliphagidae Honeyeaters and Australian Chats". In Higgins, Peter J.; Peter, Jeffrey M.; Steele, W. K. (eds.). Handbook of Australian, New Zealand and Antarctic Birds. Vol. 5: Tyrant-flycatchers to Chats. Melbourne: Oxford University Press. pp. 457–461. ISBN 978-0-19-553258-6.
- Higgins, Peter J.; Peter, Jeffrey M.; Steele, W. K., eds. (2001). "Anthochaera carunculata Red Wattlebird". Handbook of Australian, New Zealand and Antarctic Birds. Vol. 5: Tyrant-flycatchers to Chats. Melbourne: Oxford University Press. pp. 463–81. ISBN 978-0-19-553258-6.
- Jobling, James A. (2010). The Helm Dictionary of Scientific Bird Names. London: Christopher Helm. ISBN 978-1-4081-2501-4.
- Latham, John (1790). Index Ornithologicus, Sive Systema Ornithologiae: Complectens Avium Divisionem in Classes, Ordines, Genera, Species, Ipsarumque Varietates (in Latin). Vol. 1. London: Leigh & Sotheby.
- Salomonsen, F. (1967). "Family Meliphagidae, Honeyeaters". In Paynter, R.A. Jnr. (ed.). Check-list of Birds of the World. Vol. 12. Cambridge, Mass.: Museum of Comparative Zoology. pp. 338–450.
- Shephard, Mark (1989). Aviculture in Australia: Keeping and Breeding Aviary Birds. Prahran, Victoria, Australia: Black Cockatoo Press. ISBN 978-0-9588106-0-9.
- Vigors, N. A.; Horsfield, T. (1827). "A Description of the Australian Birds in the Collection of the Linnean Society; With an Attempt at Arranging Them According to Their Natural Affinities (Part 1)". Transactions of the Linnean Society of London. 15 (1): 170–331. doi:10.1111/j.1095-8339.1826.tb00115.x. The title page of the issue has the year 1826.
- White, John (1790). Journal of a Voyage to New South Wales with Sixty-five Plates of Non-descript Animals, Birds, Lizards, Serpents, Curious Cones of Trees and Other Natural Productions. Vol. 1790. London: J. Debrett.
