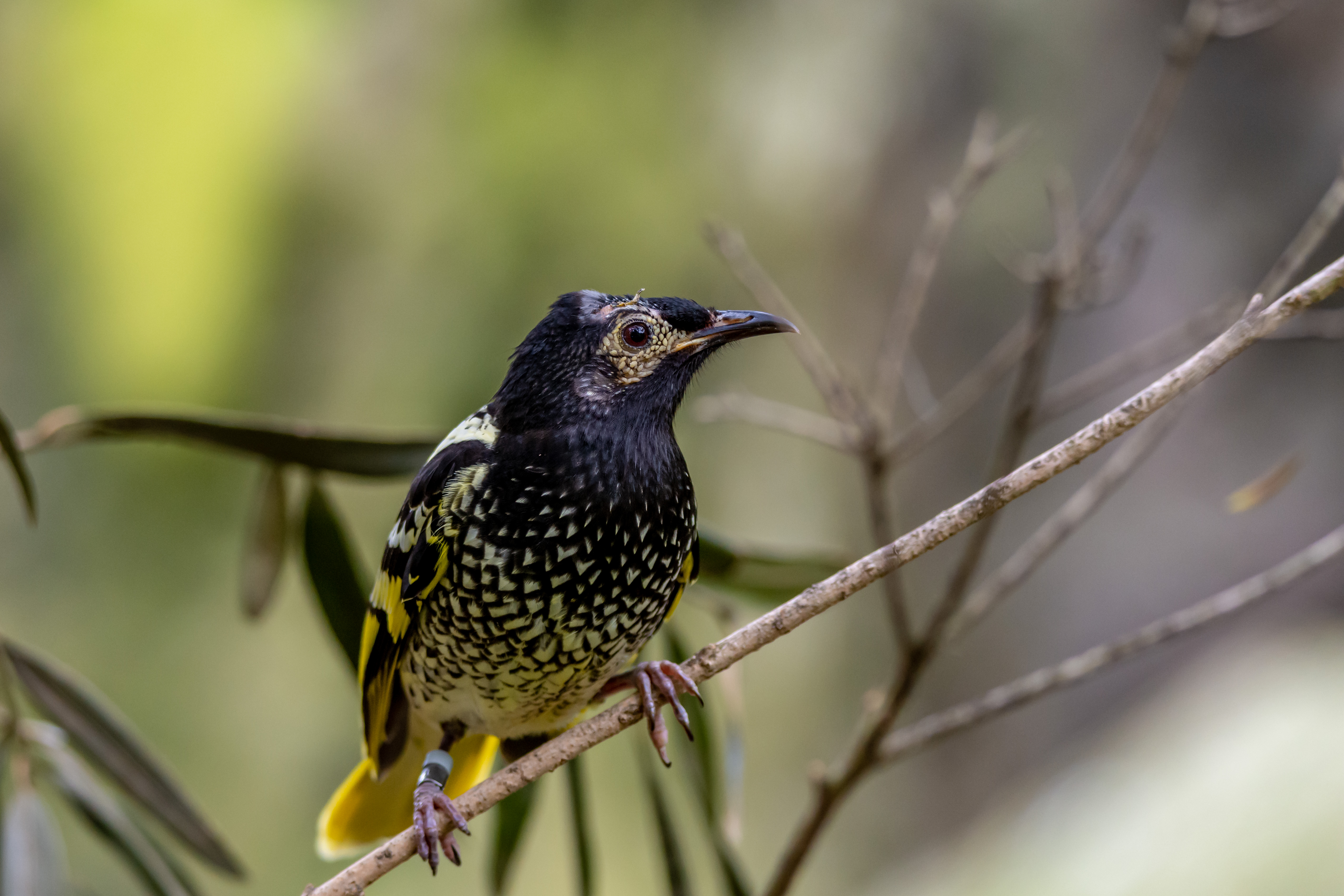

Conservation status
- Critically Endangered (IUCN 3.1)

Scientific classification
- Kingdom: Animalia
- Phylum: Chordata
- Class: Aves
- Order: Passeriformes
- Family: Meliphagidae
- Genus: Anthochaera
- Species: A. phrygia

Binomial name
- Anthochaera phrygia (Shaw, 1794)
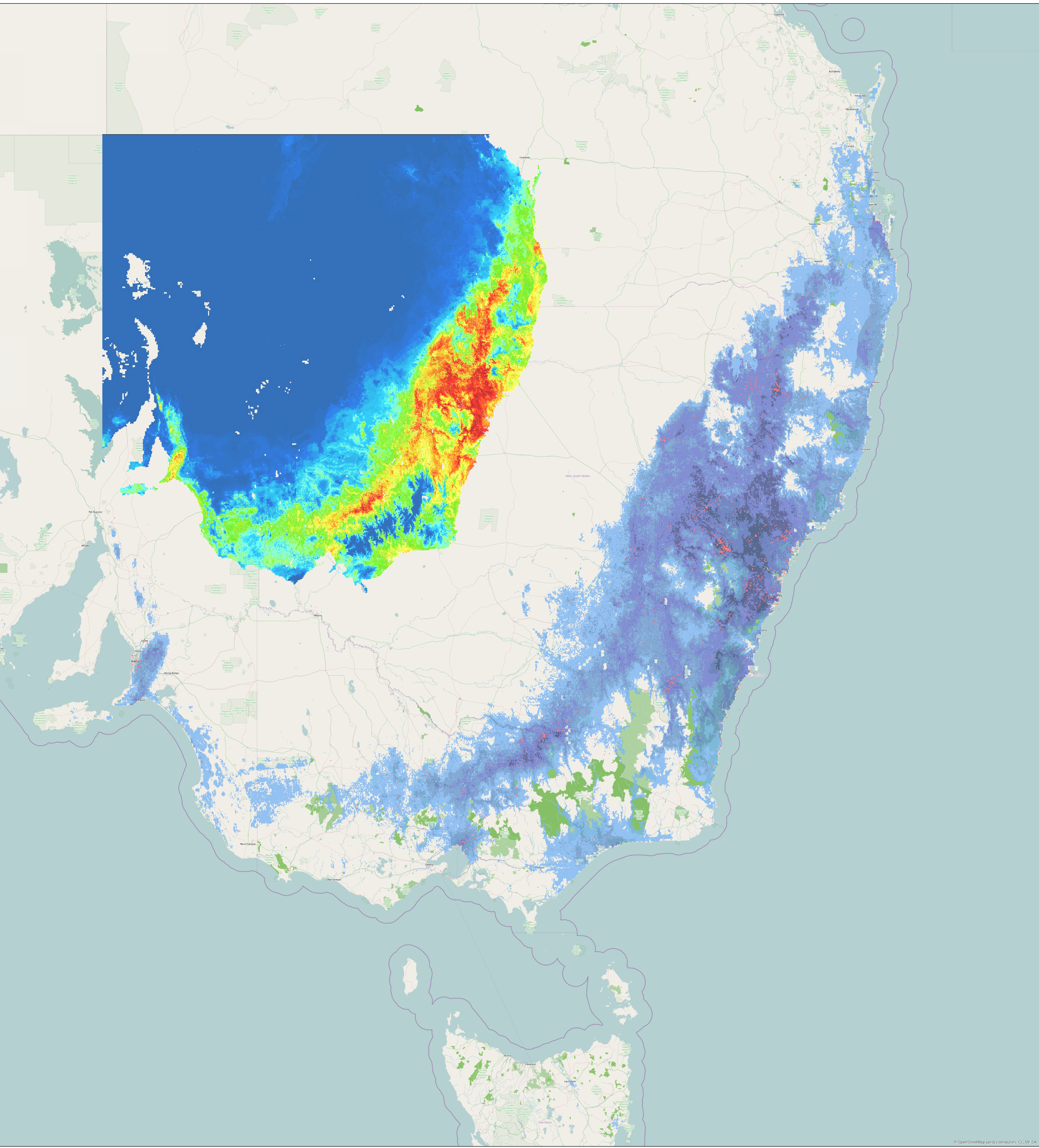
- Distribution of the regent honeyeater, see file for more details.

Synonyms
- Xanthomyza phrygia

= Regent honeyeater =

Critically endangered Australian species of bird

The regent honeyeater (Anthochaera phrygia) is a critically endangered bird endemic to southeastern Australia. It is commonly considered a flagship species within its range, with the efforts going into its conservation having positive effects on many other species that share its habitat. Recent genetic research suggests it is closely related to the wattlebirds.

== Taxonomy ==
First described by the English naturalist George Shaw in 1794, the regent honeyeater was moved to Anthochaera in 1827 by the naturalists Nicholas Aylward Vigors and Thomas Horsfield. It was known as Xanthomyza phrygia (Zanthomiza by Gregory Mathews)for many years, the genus erected by William Swainson in 1837. DNA analysis shows that its ancestry is in fact nested within the wattlebird genus Anthochaera. The ancestor of the regent honeyeater split from a lineage that gave rise to the red and yellow wattlebirds. The little and western wattlebirds arose from another lineage that diverged earlier. The generic name Anthochaera derives from the Ancient Greek anthos 'flower, bloom' and khairō 'enjoy'; the specific epithet phrygia derives from Latin phrygius, referring to the people of Phrygia who were skilled in embroidery with gold.

== Description ==
The neck and head are glossy black. The breast is covered with contrasting pale yellow speckles, and the feathers in the tail and wings are black and bright yellow.

=== Diet ===
It feeds primarily on nectar from eucalyptus and mistletoe species, and to a lesser extent on insects and their honeydew. It also feeds on both native and cultivated fruit.

=== Breeding ===
Breeding mostly occurs from August to January, during the southern spring and summer. The breeding season appears to correspond with the flowering of key eucalyptus and mistletoe species. Two or three eggs are laid in a cup-shaped nest. Nest success, and productivity of successful nests, has been found to be low in this species, with nest surveillance revealing high predation by a range of bird and arboreal mammal species. There is also a male bias to the adult sex ratio, with an estimated 1.18 males per female.

== Distribution ==
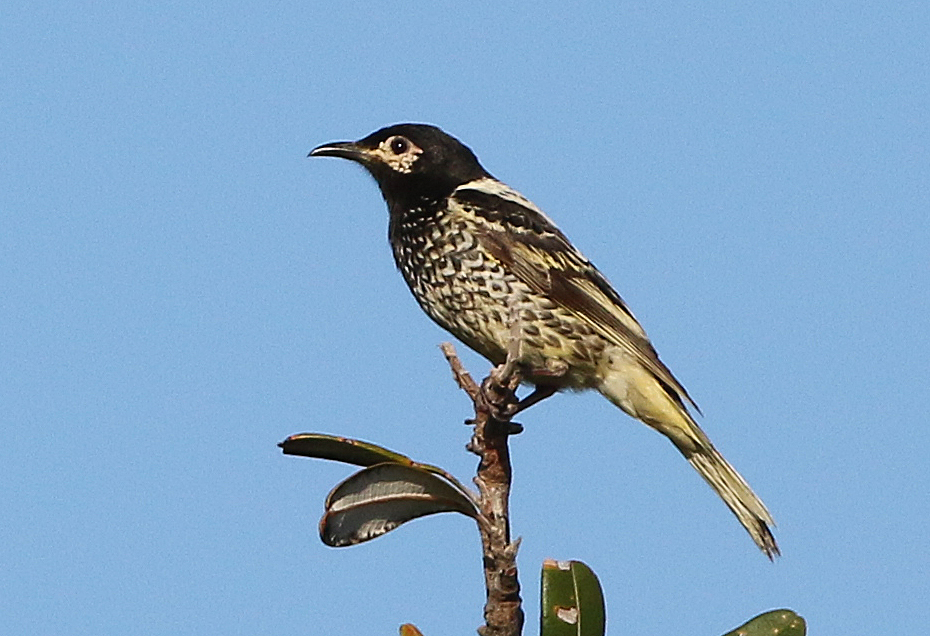
In New South Wales

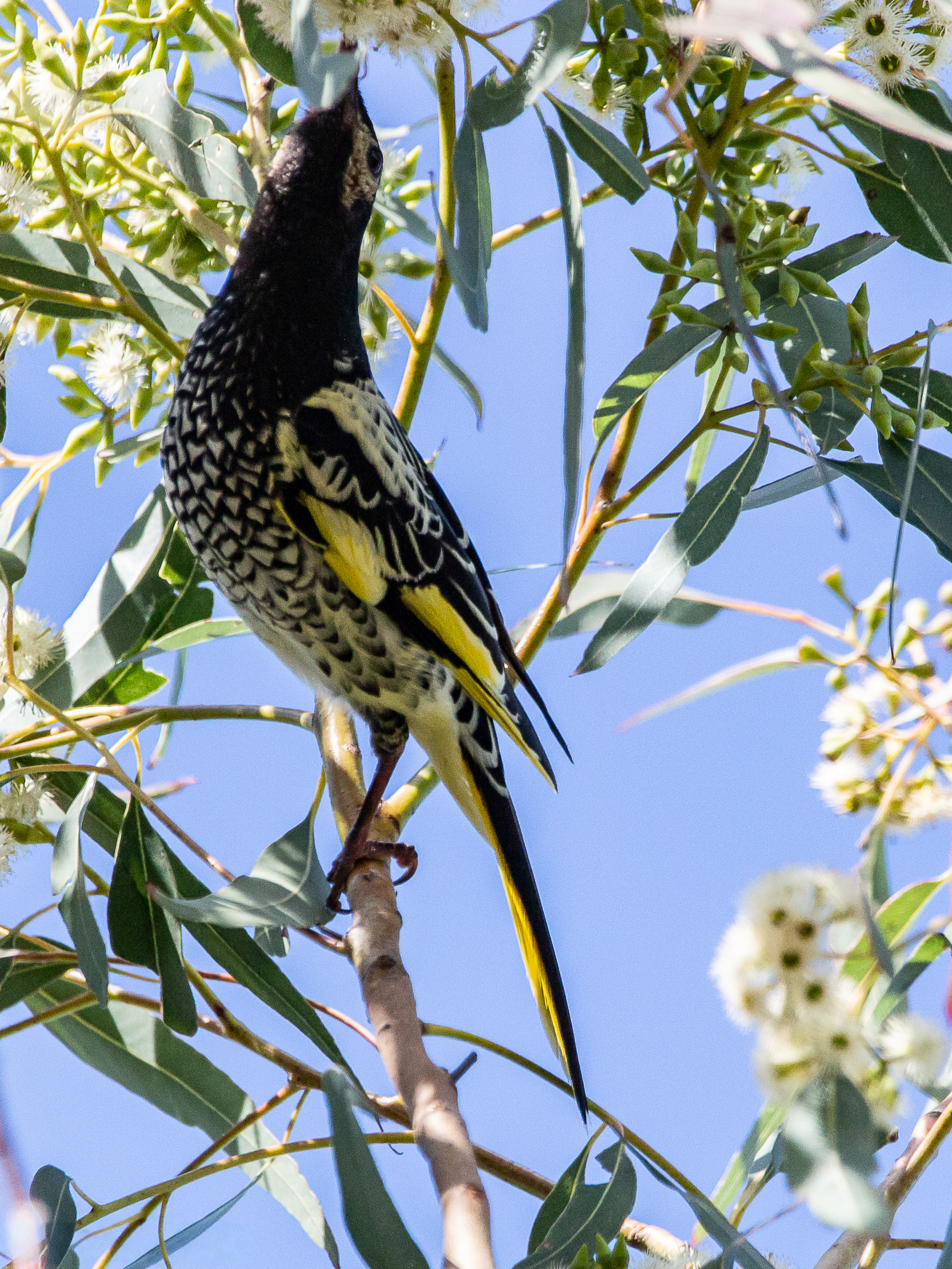
Regent honeyeater

The regent honeyeater was once common in wooded areas of eastern Australia, especially along the inland slopes of the Great Dividing Range. It once could be found as far west as Adelaide, but is now gone from South Australia and western Victoria. As of June 2020 their range covers from north-east Victoria up to around the Sunshine Coast, Queensland, but the population is now scattered. Most sightings are from a few sites in north-eastern Victoria, along the western slopes of the Great Dividing Range in New South Wales and the central coast of New South Wales. In 1999 the three main breeding areas were the Bundarra-Barraba area and Capertee Valley of New South Wales, and north-eastern Victoria.

Most of these breeding sites were affected by the devastating 2019–2020 Australian bushfires, which will likely have a very negative effect on the already-small wild population.

=== Important Bird Areas ===
BirdLife International identified the following sites as being important for regent honeyeaters in 2011:

Queensland

- Traprock

New South Wales

- Brisbane Water
- Bundarra-Barraba
- Capertee Valley
- Greater Blue Mountains
- Hastings-Macleay
- Hunter Valley
- Lake Macquarie
- Mudgee-Wollar
- Richmond Woodlands
- Tuggerah

Victoria

- Warby-Chiltern Box-Ironbark Region

In July and August 2018, pairs of birds were seen at three sites in south-eastern Queensland. A spokesman for BirdLife Australia said this was indicative of the current drought conditions in northern New South Wales placing pressure on the birds to find more favourable food sources.

== Conservation status ==
The regent honeyeater is listed as critically endangered on the IUCN Red List, and was listed as endangered under both Australia's Environment Protection and Biodiversity Conservation Act 1999 (EPBC Act)and Queensland's Nature Conservation Act 1992. The Action Plan for Australian Birds 2010, compiled by researchers from Charles Darwin University, and published in October 2011 by the CSIRO, added the regent honeyeater to the "critically endangered" list, giving habitat loss as the major threat.

The bird was upgraded from endangered to critically endangered nationally (under the EPBC Act) on 9 July 2015. Each state has applied its own rating to the bird under state legislation, varying from "threatened" (Victoria) to "critically endangered" (NSW).

The Commonwealth Department of the Environment formulated a National Recovery Plan for the regent honeyeater in April 2016. The 2019-2020 fires would likely push the species closer to extinction, with only about 250 of the species left in the wild at that time.

A 2018 study ranked it seventh in a list of Australian birds most likely to go extinct.

A genetic study published in 2019 used hybridization RAD (hyRAD) technique on recent and museum samples from wild birds ranging over a 100-year time frame sampled throughout the historical and contemporary range, and assessing the impact of the decline on recent and current population size, structure and genetic diversity. The museum sampling showed that population structure in regent honeyeaters was historically low, which remains the case despite severe fragmentation of their breeding range. Extinction may occur in this nomadic species before a detectable genomic impact of small population size is realised.

A March 2021 research study warned that the rapid decline in the rare songbird means its young are struggling to learn mating calls as adults disappear, which could further strain conservation efforts and avoid extinction. The complexity of their songs has declined, and 12 per cent of males were found to be singing other species' songs, including the currawong and eastern rosella. According to one of the authors of the study, this loss of song can reduce the birds' ability to find a mate, and, if they do, the female is less likely to lay an egg.

=== Conservation efforts ===
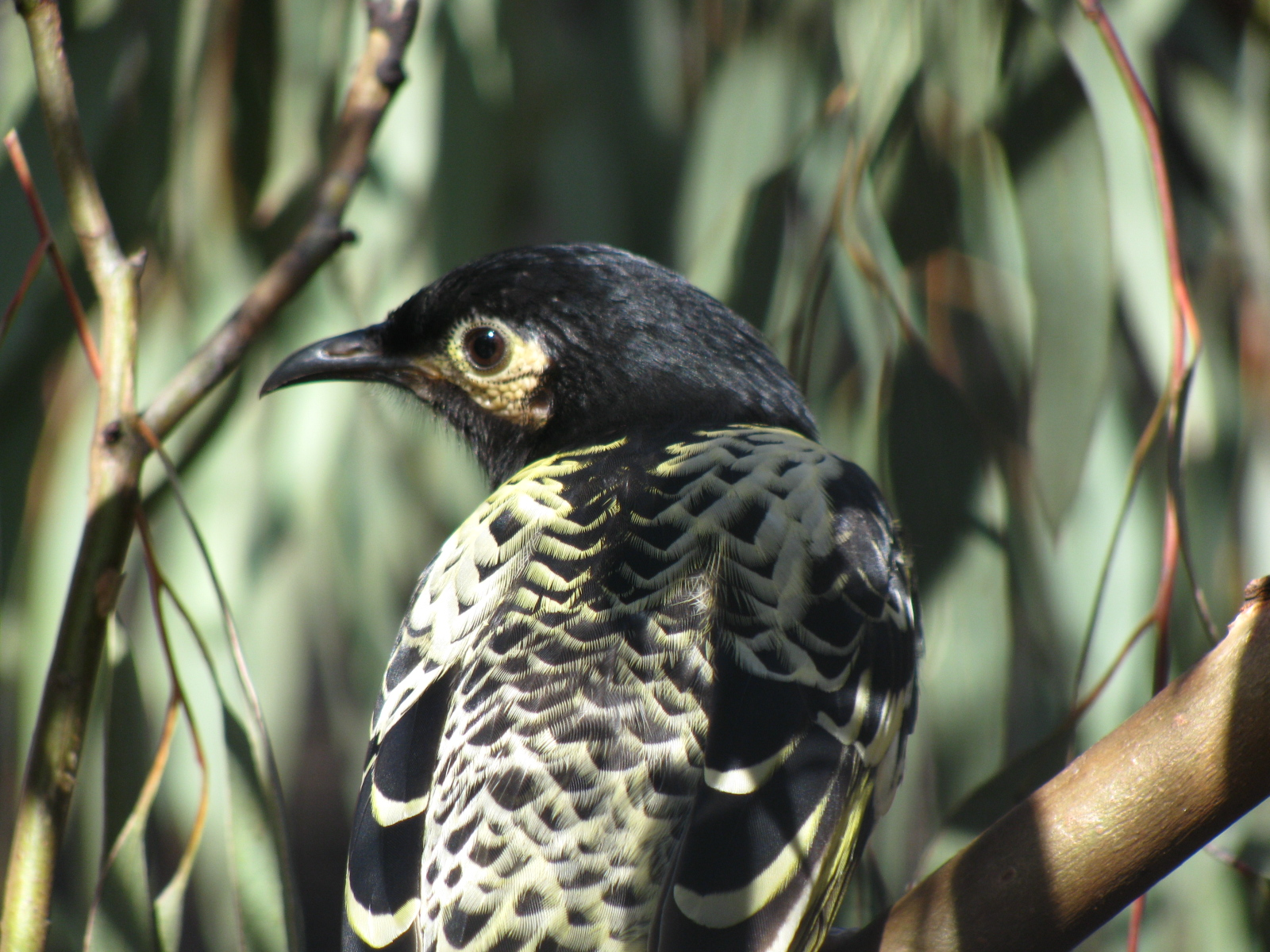
Regent honeyeater at Adelaide Zoo, South Australia

A captive breeding program on a private property in the Hunter Valley released 20 birds – 11 female and 9 male – into the wild in June 2020. In 2012, birds had been released in the same area from a Taronga Zoo breeding program. Much work was being done to ensure that the birds had sources of food, and most of the birds were fitted with tiny radio transmitters so that their movements could be tracked. With about 13 wild birds at the site, it was hoped that those released from captivity would breed with the wild ones and increase the population and diversity. This was the first release of regent honeyeaters since a similar event in north-eastern Victoria. In August 2020, one of the banded birds was spotted and photographed at a Hunter Valley home, for the first time since her release two months earlier. Another of the birds was found and led the conservationists to a new flock of wild regent honeyeaters near Broke, about 30 kilometres (19 mi) from the release site, of which they had not previously been aware.

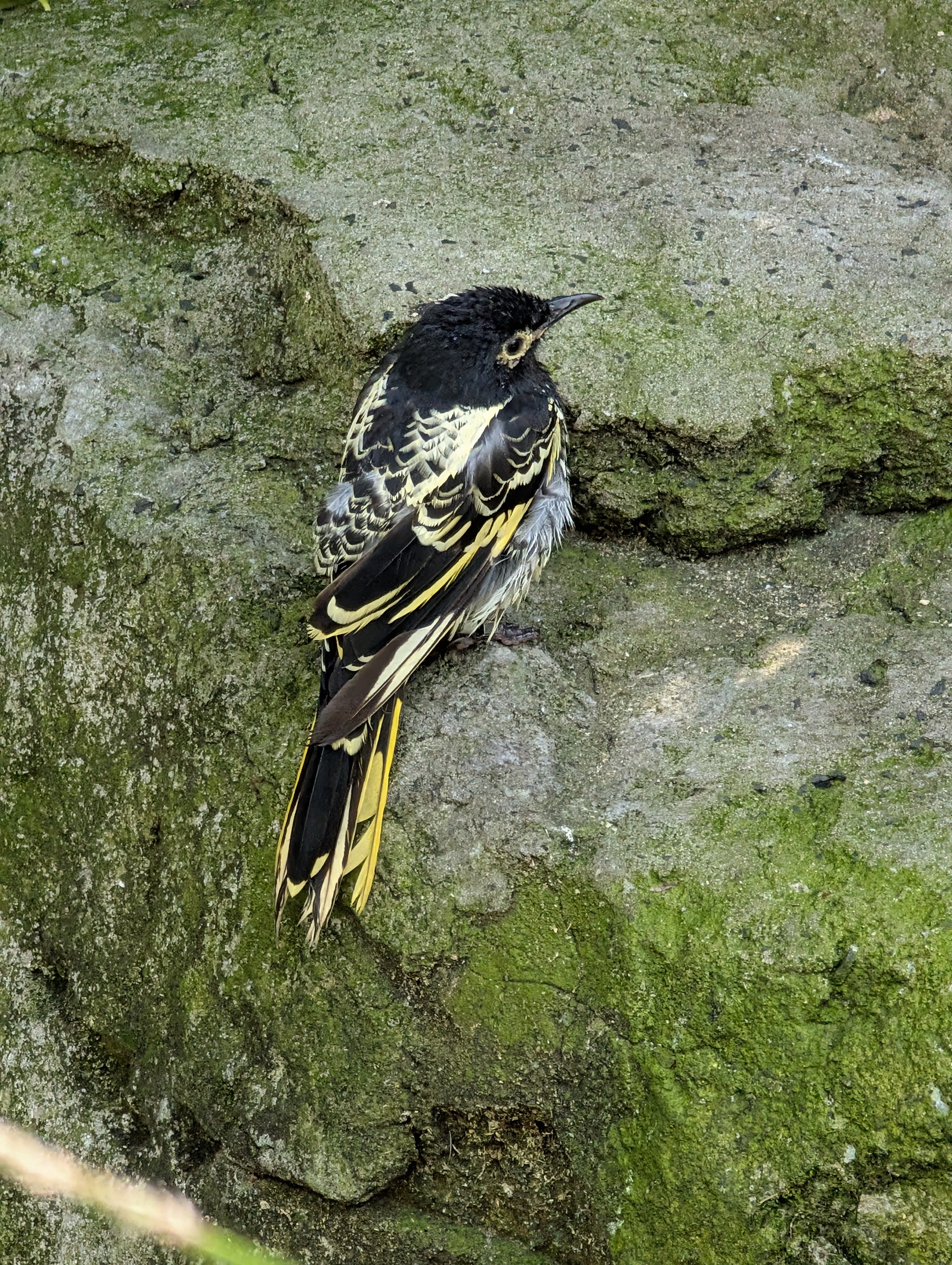
Regent honeyeater (Anthochaera phrygia), Taronga ZOO, Sydney, Australia
