= Traprock =

Traprock or trap rock may refer to:

- Trap rock, form of igneous rock exhibiting polygonal vertical fractures
- Traprock Important Bird Area, Queensland, Australia
- Trap Rock River, Michigan, USA
- Walter E. Traprock, pseudonym of American architect and author George Shepard Chappell
- Trap metal, a fusion genre sometimes called "Trap rock" in rare instances

== See also ==
- Petroleum trap
- Trap music and Rock music
