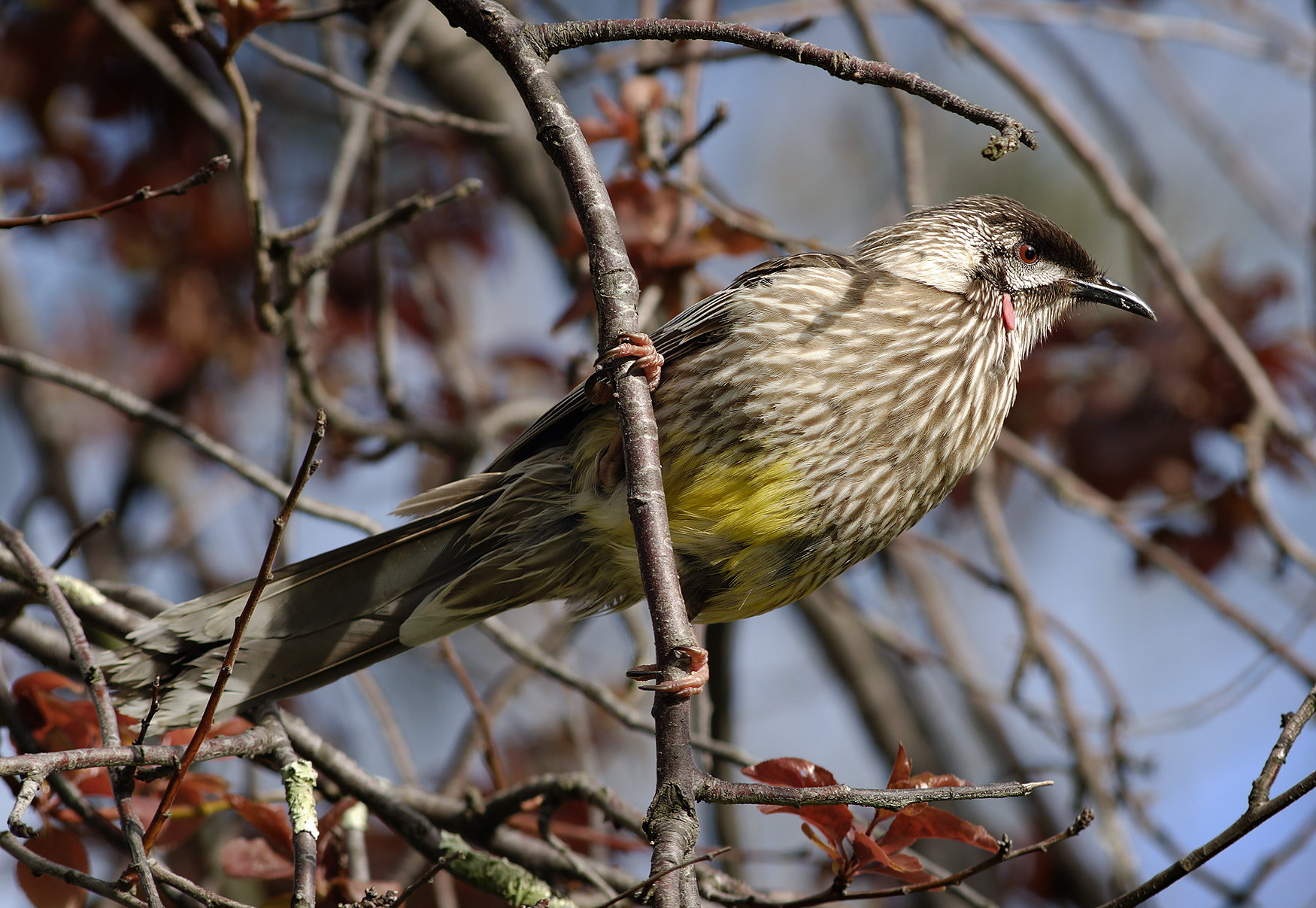
- Red wattlebird (Anthochaera carunculata)

Scientific classification
- Kingdom: Animalia
- Phylum: Chordata
- Class: Aves
- Order: Passeriformes
- Family: Meliphagidae
- Genus: Anthochaera; Vigors & Horsfield, 1827

Type species
- Anthochaera carunculatus Vigors & Horsfield, 1827

Species
- See text

= Anthochaera =

Genus of birds

Anthochaera is a genus of birds in the honeyeater family. The species are endemic to Australia and include the little wattlebird, the red wattlebird, the western wattlebird, and the yellow wattlebird. A molecular phylogenetic study has shown that the regent honeyeater also belongs in this genus.

== Description ==
Of the five species in the genus only the yellow wattlebird (Anthochaera paradoxa) and the red wattlebird (A. carunculata) have the wattles of their common name. These are bare fleshy appendages, usually wrinkled and often brightly coloured, hanging from the cheeks, neck or throat, and presumably serving for display.

A common name for species of the genus is wattlebird, a term also used for unrelated avian species.

== Taxonomy ==
The genus Anthochaera was introduced in 1827 by the naturalists Nicholas Aylward Vigors and Thomas Horsfield. The name is derived from the Greek anthos meaning flower or bloom and khairō meaning to enjoy. The type species was designated as the little wattlebird by the German ornithologist Hans Friedrich Gadow in 1884.

The regent honeyeater (Anthochaera phrygia) was formerly placed in its own genus, Xanthomyza, but placed with the Anthochaera genus in a 2004 molecular phylogenetic study. The genus Anthochaera is sister group to the species Acanthagenys rufogularis, the spiny-cheeked honeyeater, separated as a monotypic genus.

- - Acanthagenys
    - Spiny-cheeked honeyeater (Acanthagenys rufogularis)
  - Anthochaera
    - - Little wattlebird (Anthochaera chrysoptera)
      - Western wattlebird (Anthochaera lunulata)
    - - Regent honeyeater (Anthochaera phrygia)
      - - Red wattlebird (Anthochaera carunculata)
        - Yellow wattlebird (Anthochaera paradoxa)

Cladogram showing the relationship between species.

== Species and distribution ==
The genus Anthochaera contains the following species:

Image	Common name	Scientific name	Distribution
	Red wattlebird	Anthochaera carunculata	southeast Queensland, New South Wales, Victoria, South Australia and southwest Western Australia
	Little wattlebird	Anthochaera chrysoptera	coastal and sub-coastal south-eastern Australia
	Yellow wattlebird	Anthochaera paradoxa	Tasmania
	Western wattlebird	Anthochaera lunulata	south-western Australia.
	Regent honeyeater	Anthochaera phrygia	south-eastern Australia

== See also ==
- List of Australian birds
