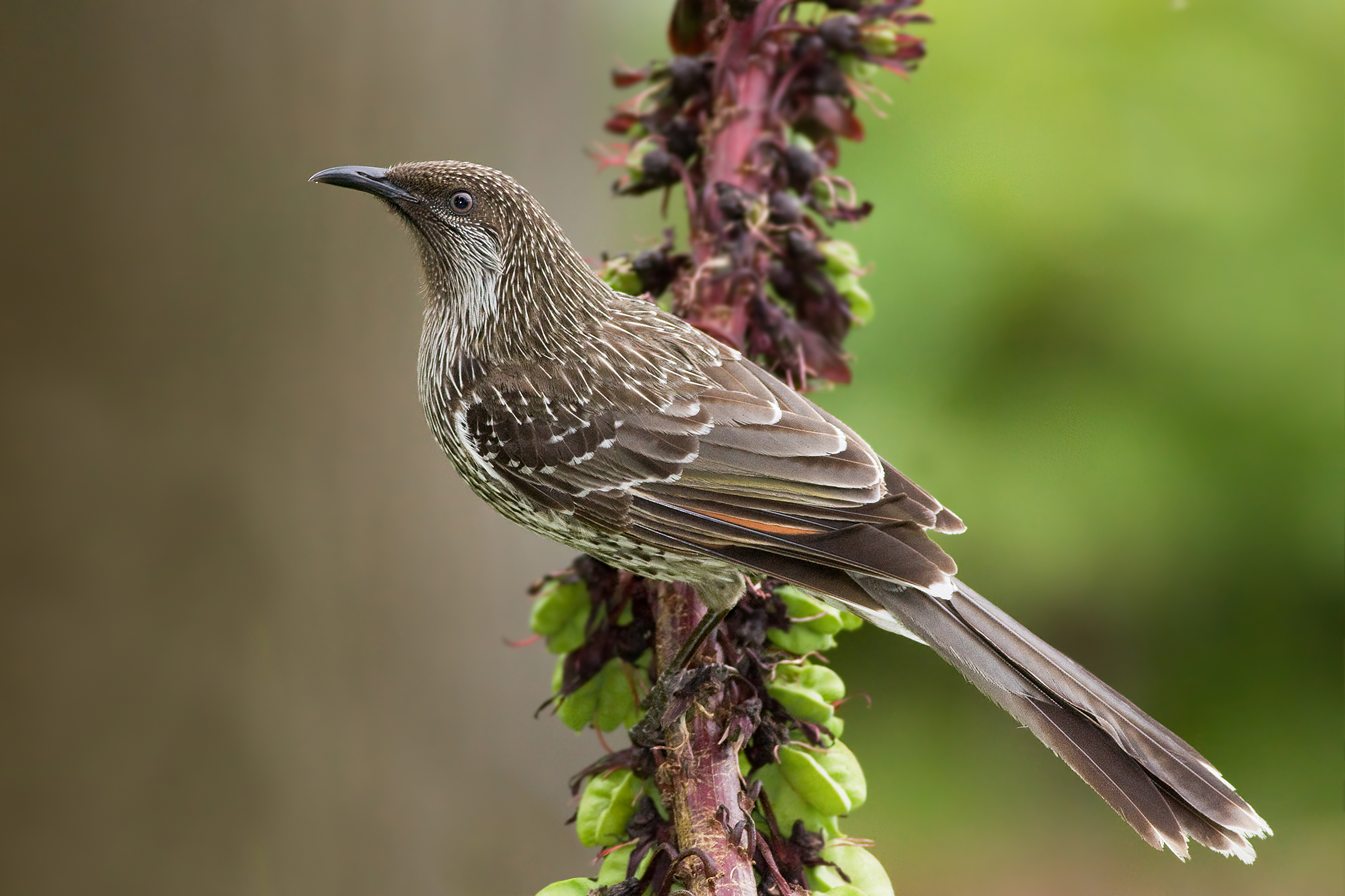

Conservation status
- Least Concern (IUCN 3.1)

Scientific classification
- Kingdom: Animalia
- Phylum: Chordata
- Class: Aves
- Order: Passeriformes
- Family: Meliphagidae
- Genus: Anthochaera
- Species: A. chrysoptera

Binomial name
- Anthochaera chrysoptera (Latham, 1801)

= Little wattlebird =

Species of bird

The little wattlebird (Anthochaera chrysoptera), also known as the brush wattlebird, is a passerine bird in the honeyeater family Meliphagidae. It is found in coastal and sub-coastal south-eastern Australia.

== Taxonomy ==
The little wattlebird was formally described by ornithologist John Latham in 1801 under the binomial name Merops chrysoptera. The species is now placed in the genus Anthochaera that was introduced by Nicholas Aylward Vigors and Thomas Horsfield in 1827. The generic name Anthochaera derives from the Ancient Greek anthos 'flower, bloom' and khairō 'enjoy'; the specific epithet chrysoptera derives from Ancient Greek khrysos 'gold' and pteron 'wing'.

The International Ornithologists' Union recognise three subspecies:

- A. c. chrysoptera (Latham, 1801) – eastern and southeastern Australia
- A. c. halmaturina (Mathews, 1912) – Kangaroo Island (South Australia)
- A. c. tasmanica (Mathews, 1912) – Tasmania

The western wattlebird (A. lunulata) was at one time considered as the subspecies A. c. lunulata.

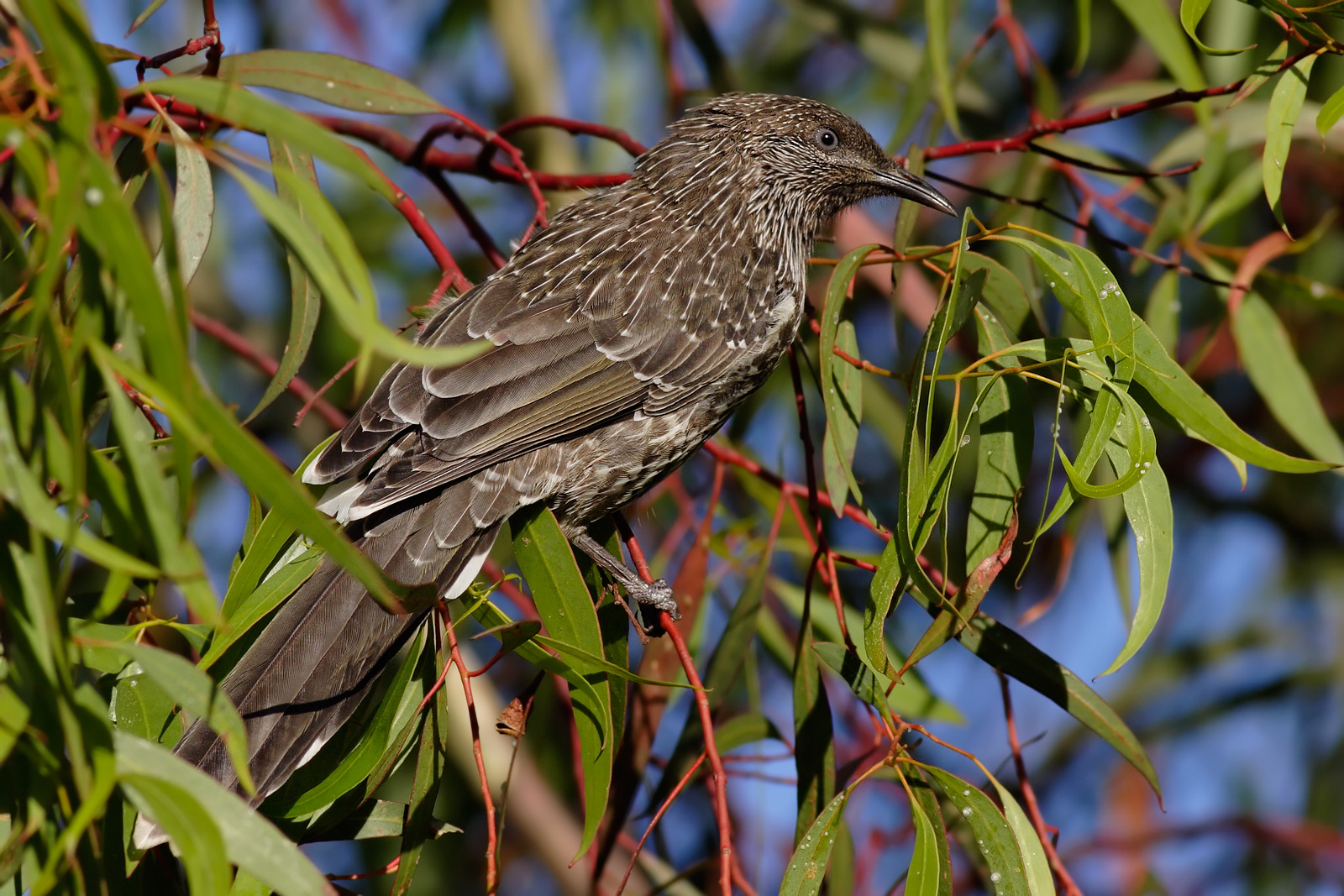
Little wattlebird on eucalypt, Victoria, Australia

== Description ==
The little wattlebird is a medium to large honeyeater, but the smallest wattlebird. The appearance is similar to the yellow wattlebird and the red wattlebird. The little wattlebird lacks the wattles, which characterise other members of the genus. Juveniles are duller with less streaking and have a browner eye.

Calls include a strident cookay-cok, a raucous fetch the gun, a mellow guttural yekkop, yekkop and many squeaky, musical lilting notes. The alarm call is a kwock or shnairt!.

== Distribution and habitat ==
The little wattlebird is found in banksia/eucalypt woodlands, heathlands, tea-tree scrub, sandplain-heaths, lantana thickets, wild tobacco, parks and gardens.

== Behaviour ==
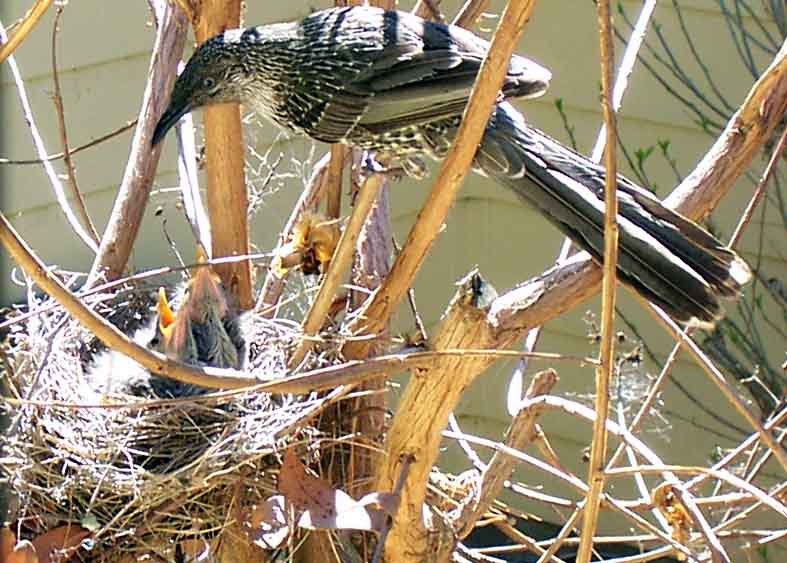
Little wattlebird feeding nestlings, September 2002, NSW

=== Breeding ===
Breeding takes place from June to December. The female wattlebird generally constructs the nest, which is a loose, untidy cup of twigs, lined with shredded bark, and placed from 1 to 10 m high in the fork of a banksia, tea-tree or eucalypt sapling. 1-2 eggs are laid and may be spotted red-brown, purplish-red or salmon-pink in colour. The female incubates the eggs alone but both parents care for the young chicks.

=== Feeding ===
Little wattlebirds feed on nectar obtained with a long, brush-tipped tongue, adapted for probing deep into flowers. They also feed on insects, berries, and some seeds. Most feeding is done perched, but some insects are caught in mid-air. Birds may feed alone or in groups.
