= Porcupine grass =

Porcupine grass is a common name for several grasses and may refer to:

- Miscanthus sinensis, native to eastern Asia
- Stipa spartea (Hesperostipa spartea), native to North America
- Triodia species (such as Triodia scariosa and Triodia irritans), native to Australia
