= Traprock Important Bird Area =

Coordinates: 28°22′40″S 151°35′27″E

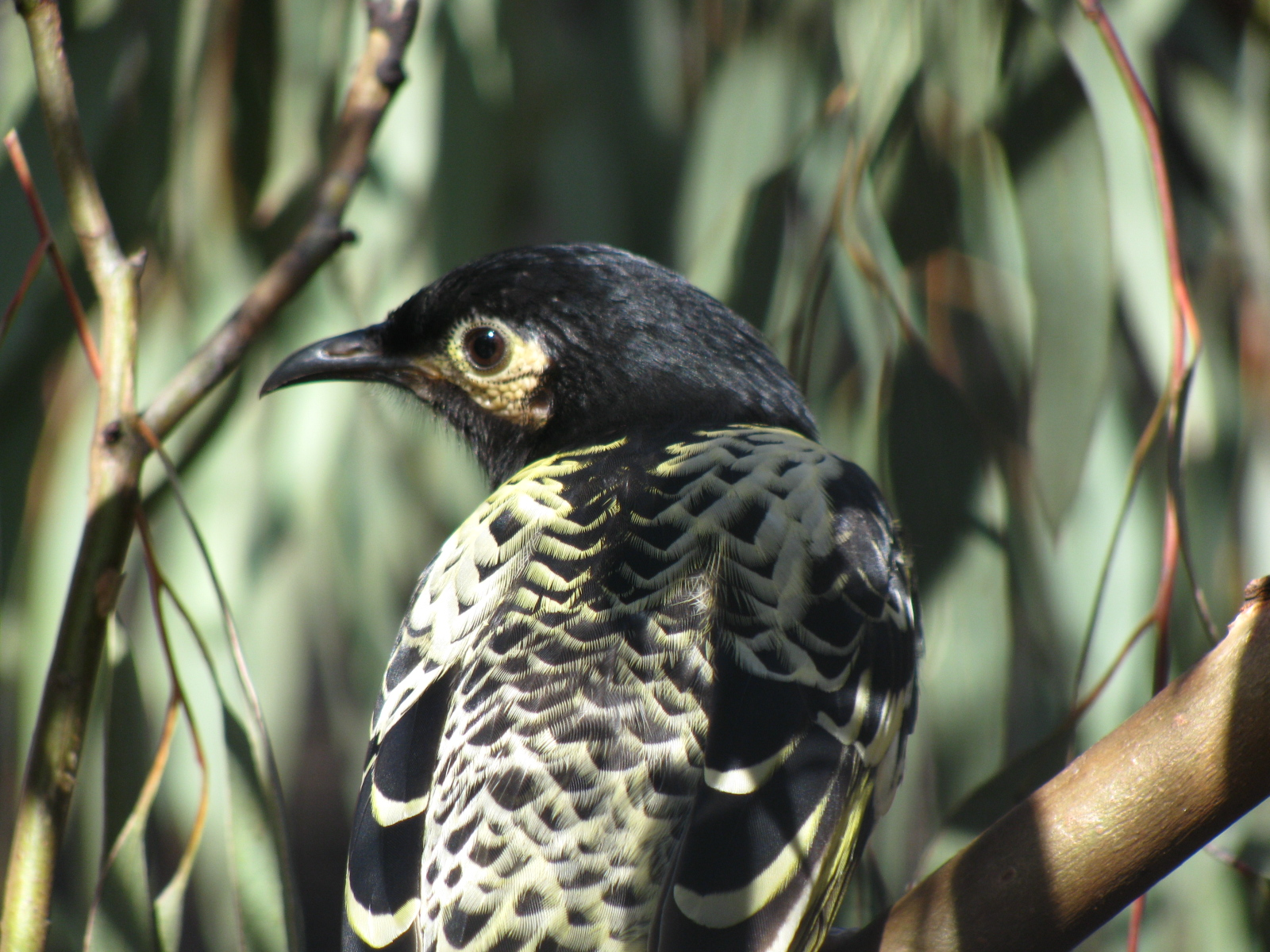
The IBA is an important area for regent honeyeaters

The Traprock Important Bird Area comprises a 627 km^{2} tract of land in the Darling Downs region of south-eastern Queensland, Australia.

== Description ==
The site consists of grassy woodlands, much of which is grazed by sheep, west of the town of Warwick in the Nandewar bioregion. It is defined as an Important Bird Area (IBA) by the recent occurrence of regent honeyeaters, and includes the McIntyre and Durikai state forests and the upper catchment of McIntyre Brook. It lies in the upper Murray-Darling basin not far from the state border with New South Wales. The two state forests contain areas of selectively logged eucalypt forest and woodlands with spotted gum and box–ironbark plant communities. Geologically, the area is mostly rocky, metamorphosed sedimentaries and interbedded volcanics with infertile soils that are not suitable for agriculture. Over 500 km^{2} of the land in the IBA is owned by a few major private landowners, with the remainder being state forest.

== Birds ==
The site has been identified as an IBA by BirdLife International because it supports a small, regularly breeding population of endangered regent honeyeaters, as well as significant populations of diamond firetails at the northern end of their range. Other birds of conservation concern found in the IBA are glossy black cockatoos, turquoise parrots, black-chinned honeyeaters, powerful owls, hooded robins, grey-crowned babblers and speckled warblers.

Other animals found in the IBA that are listed as threatened under Queensland's Nature Conservation Act 1992 include the border thick-tailed gecko and little pied bat.
