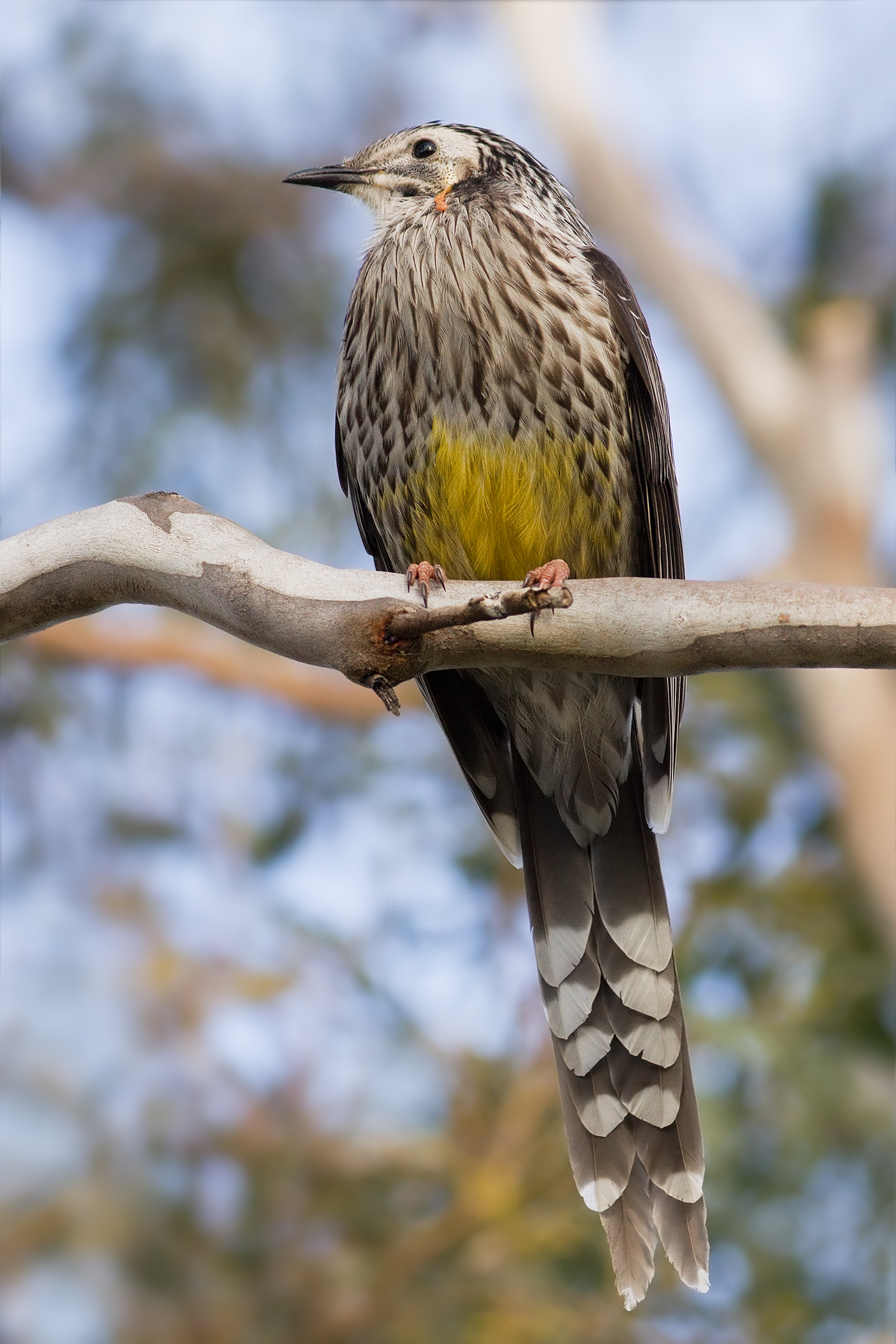

Conservation status
- Least Concern (IUCN 3.1)

Scientific classification
- Kingdom: Animalia
- Phylum: Chordata
- Class: Aves
- Order: Passeriformes
- Family: Meliphagidae
- Genus: Anthochaera
- Species: A. paradoxa

Binomial name
- Anthochaera paradoxa (Daudin, 1800)
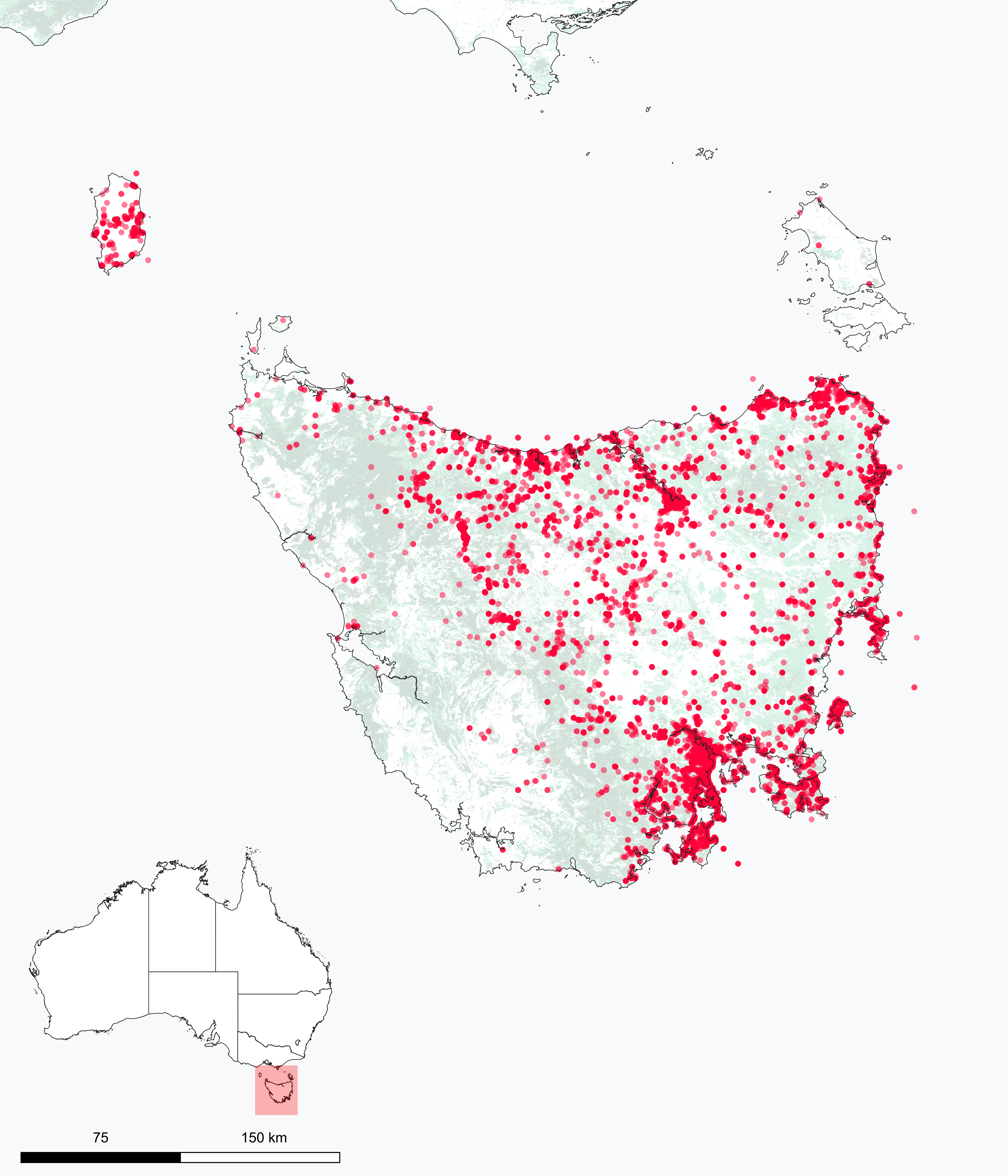

Synonyms
- Corvus paradoxus Daudin, 1800

= Yellow wattlebird =

Species of bird

The yellow wattlebird (Anthochaera paradoxa) is a species of bird in the honeyeater family Meliphagidae.

== Taxonomy ==
The yellow wattlebird was described by French zoologist François Marie Daudin as Corvus paradoxus in 1800.

The generic name Anthochaera derives from the Ancient Greek anthos 'flower, bloom' and khairō 'enjoy'. The specific epithet paradoxa derives from the Ancient Greek paradoxos meaning 'strange, extraordinary'.

"Yellow wattlebird" has been designated as the official common name for the species by the International Ornithologists' Union (IOC). Other common names include the "long wattlebird" or "Tasmanian wattlebird".

== Description ==
The yellow wattlebird is the largest of the honeyeaters, and is endemic to Tasmania. They are usually 37.5–45 centimetres (14.8–17.7 in) long. Body mass in males averages 168 g (5.9 oz) and in females averages 123 g (4.3 oz), with the largest males weighing up to 260 g (9.2 oz). They are named for the wattles hanging from the cheeks. Yellow wattlebirds are slim birds with a short, strong bill. They have a white face and black-streaked crown. They also have a long, pendulous yellow-orange wattle. The wattle becomes brighter during the breeding season. They have dark wings and a yellow belly, whereas the upperparts are grey to dusky brown. The female yellow wattlebird is much smaller than the male. The young yellow wattlebirds have much smaller wattles, a paler head, and a browner underbelly than the adult birds.

The yellow wattlebird is similar in appearance to the little wattlebird and the red wattlebird.

== Distribution and habitat ==
Yellow wattlebirds are common in Tasmania, especially in the eastern and central areas. They are uncommon on King Island, and two possible sightings recorded on the southern Mornington Peninsula in Victoria lack material evidence.

Yellow wattlebirds live in a variety of habitats including both dry and wet forests, and from sea level to the subalpine zone. They live in coastal heaths, forests and gardens near Eucalyptus trees. They also can be found in mountain shrubberies and open woodlands, particularly those dominated by Banksia. They have also been known to occur on golf courses, and in orchards, parks and gardens.

== Behaviour ==
Yellow wattlebirds are active and acrobatic with a strong flight. They are fairly tame birds and often enter gardens looking for food.

Harsh, raucous and grating, their calls have often been compared to a person coughing or belching, with a gurgling growk or repeated clok sound

Yellow wattlebirds feed on the nectar of eucalypts and banksias, fruit, insects, spiders, honeydew, honey bees on the flight and manna (crystallised plant sap). They forage at all levels from the ground to the canopy. However, the blossoming of eucalyptus trees can be highly irregular in time and place, causing considerable changes from year to year in the breeding distribution of yellow wattlebirds, which rely on their nectar as a main source of food. Therefore, the most likely threat to the yellow wattlebird is unusual climatic conditions that can reduce food availability suddenly. Yellow wattlebirds can pollinate eucalyptus trees by carrying pollen in their bills or on the feathers of their heads.

=== Breeding ===
Yellow wattlebirds nest in breeding pairs and aggressively defend their territories from other birds. The nest of the yellow wattlebird is made by the female alone, and is a large, open saucer-shaped structure made of twigs and bark that are bound by wool. The inside of the nest is lined with wool and grass. The nests can be up to 13 centimetres (5.1 in) high and are found in trees or shrubs. Yellow wattlebirds lay 2–3 eggs that are salmon-red, spotted and blotched red-brown, purplish-red and blue-grey. Both the males and females incubate the egg and feed the young.

== External links and further reading ==
- Recordings of yellow wattlebird from Cornell Laboratory of Ornithology's Macaulay Library
- Recordings of yellow wattlebird from Xeno-canto sound archive
- Images of yellow wattlebird from Graeme Chapman's photo library
- "Yellow Wattlebird, Anthochaera paradoxa". Wildlife of Tasmania. Department of Primary Industries, Parks, Water and Environment. 5 March 2008. Archived from the original on 21 July 2008.
- Sandy Podulka; Ronald W. Rohrbaugh; Nick Booney, eds. (2004). Handbook of Bird Biology (2nd ed.). Ithaca, NY: Cornell Laboratory of Ornithology. ISBN 0-938027-62-X.
