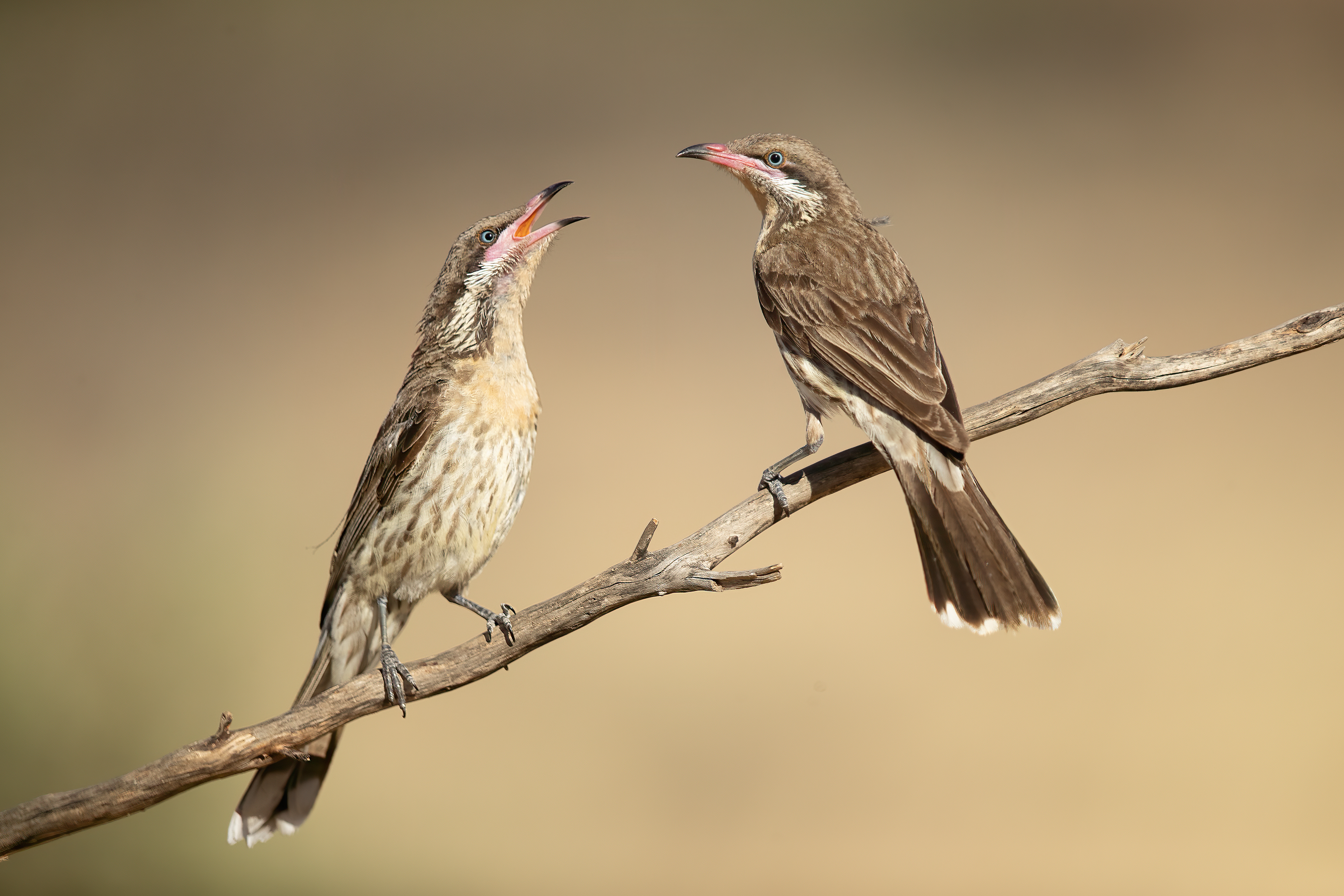

Conservation status
- Least Concern (IUCN 3.1)

Scientific classification
- Kingdom: Animalia
- Phylum: Chordata
- Class: Aves
- Order: Passeriformes
- Family: Meliphagidae
- Genus: Acanthagenys; Gould, 1838
- Species: A. rufogularis

Binomial name
- Acanthagenys rufogularis Gould, 1838
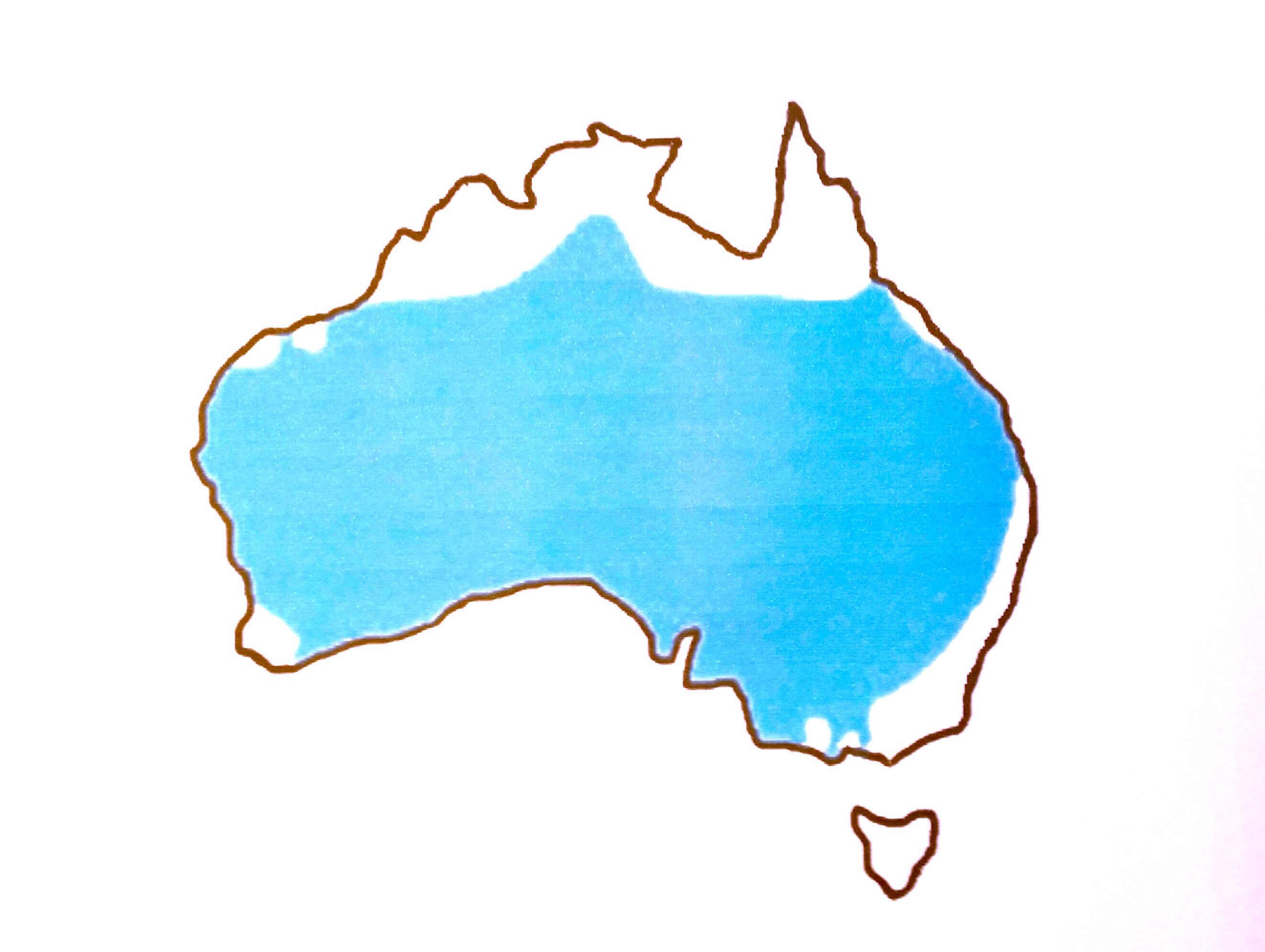
- Map of the range of the spiny-cheeked honeyeater

= Spiny-cheeked honeyeater =

Species of bird

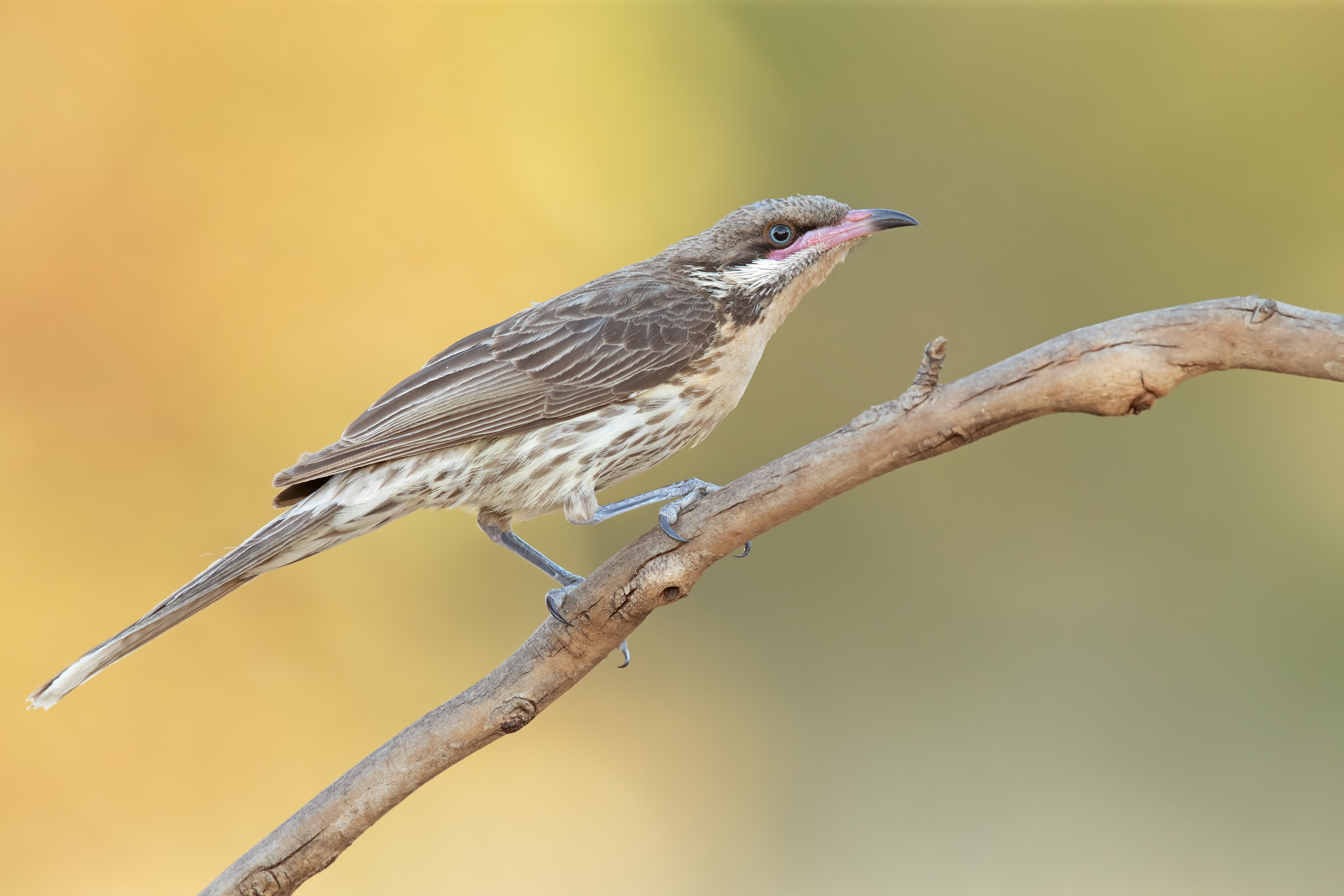
Spiny-cheeked honeyeater

The spiny-cheeked honeyeater (Acanthagenys rufogularis) is the only species in the genus Acanthagenys. It is large for a honeyeater, ranging from 22 to 27 centimeters (8.7 to 10.6 inches) tall and weighing around 52 grams. The birds are sociable, aggressive, and often observed foraging in large flocks.

The spiny-cheeked honeyeater is mainly frugivorous, but will also eat nectar, blossoms, insects, reptiles, and young birds. Its habitat includes deserts, coastal scrubland, and dry woodlands. It is also found in mangroves and orchards. Its range includes most of Australia, except for Tasmania, northern tropical areas, and the southeastern coast.

== Taxonomy ==
The spiny-cheeked honeyeater's scientific name is Acanthagenys rufogularis. The generic name Acanthagenys derives from the Ancient Greek akantha 'spine, thorn' and genys 'cheek'; the specific epithet derives from Latin rufus 'red' and gula 'throat'.

The species is endemic to Australia and has two known races: Acanthagenys rufogularis parkeri, recognised by K. C. Parkes in 1980, and A. r. rufogularis, recognised by John Gould in 1838.

== Description ==
The spiny-cheeked honeyeater, Acanthagenys rufogularis, is a medium-sized bird, ranging from 22 to 27 centimeters (8.7 to 10.6 inches) in length. Its crown is speckled, dark grey on brown plumage. The juvenile bird has a characteristic yellow cheek sash, although this is less pronounced in the adult bird, where predominantly the cheek is white with a grey and/or brown streak under the cheek.

Its beak is long and straight with a black tip and a fleshy red or pink colour towards the chin and up to the gape. The characteristic face pattern includes a long, dark stripe through the eyes to the ear coverts. The breast is creamy-white with short, browny streaks. The throat is often a light brown or cinnamon, sometimes extending from the beak to the upper breast. The wing feathers are a mottled, dark olive-brown to grey with white edges. The tail has similar colouring, but the tips of the tail-feathers are white. The under-tail coverts are white or, on some birds, light grey, and often streaked.

There seems to be an amount of variability in the appearance of many birds in this species. One example is on the Mornington Peninsula, located on the eastern coast of Port Phillip Bay in Victoria, where the spiny-cheeked honeyeaters have darker bellies. The juvenile birds of the species have a brown iris, and the facial skin is paler on the beak.

== Habitat ==
The spiny-cheeked honeyeater can be found in most locations throughout Australia, except east of the Great Dividing Range, Tasmania, the far south-west of Western Australia, and the northern Australian tropics. However, the birds do occur on Kangaroo Island in South Australia.

Most sightings have been in sparse, woody tree environments. Almost as many sightings have been in sparse, hummock grass environments, which includes beach spinifex and porcupine grass. These grasses are mostly found in arid and semi-arid parts of outback Australia. In these areas, there are occasional small shrubs or trees (mostly Acacia species), where the birds may find refuge.

Other habitats include scattered woodland, open woodlands, sparse shrubland, and closed shrubland.

The birds can also be found in managed and cultivated vegetated land and pasture lands, consisting of a range of grasses, including sedges, rushes, arrow grasses, and quillworts.

In coastal regions, such as the Mornington Peninsula, the birds can be found in tea tree environments along the foreshore.

The birds may occasionally be found in mangroves and orchards.

They are considered a nomadic species; however, this seems to be more so in the northern parts of Australia. In the south, they tend to stay in local areas, and are considered to be resident. They are a common species across their range in the continent of Australia.

== Breeding ==
Breeding has been recorded in all months, and eggs have been found from June through to March; however, 75% of the eggs would be found between late August and mid-November in the eastern range of the bird.

This is borne out by the observation of newly hatched chicks being fed by the female bird with dark-coloured larvae of the scale insect around November and December. Later observations on the Mornington Peninsula, near Sorrento, saw fully-fledged chicks in late January being fed by the male bird on red berries, available in the region at that time of year. Both parents take a role in raising the young.

The nests are often found with two or three eggs during breeding. The eggs are an off-white colour with dark brown specks across the surface of the egg; however, most of the specks are towards one end of the egg. The nests are normally located from 1 to 13 meters (3.3 to 42.7 feet) meters from the ground, depending on the available opportunities to build a nest, and are suspended hammock-like between two branches. The nests are deep and cup-shaped, woven with grass, spider silk, and spider egg-sacs. Often the nest is lined with soft materials, like possum fur or pussy tails.

== Feeding adaptations ==
The spiny-cheeked honeyeater is an opportunist when it comes to feeding. Studies have shown that 38% of their diet is nectar; however, insects, small lizards, spiders, and larvae are also in the diet.

The spiny-cheeked honeyeater is one of the largest beaked among honeyeaters in a South Australian study, where it was found that this bird's preference for nectar and insects was about the same. However, when there is an abundance of nectar in the winter and spring, the birds tend to take advantage of this resource, allowing other times of the year for their diet on insects. The bird is considered a frugivorous feeder, so the remaining diet on fruit would be around 25%, if we consider that 38% of the diet is nectar.

Observations of birds when feeding their fledglings in Sorrento, Victoria, tell of birds taking advantage of available fruit from native plants. The birds have also been seen in orchard environments, but there is no conclusive evidence that this type of fruit was a target for their diet.

== Ecology ==
The ecology of the spiny-cheeked honeyeater would be similar to that of many honeyeaters. Honeyeaters that have diets of nectar, insects, and fruit can provide several services for the bushland they inhabit.

As a nectar feeder, they have a role in pollination. The pollination activities would specialise in the production of fruit that the bird would feed on in the summer, when the fruit is ripe.

After feeding on the ripened fruit, the birds would provide a service of seed dispersal, which ensures the food source for this and other species over a widening territory. It also precludes the seed from other species that have primary diets consisting of seeds.

In addition, it was found that the bird's ability to disperse seed comes with a high probability that the seed dispersed will germinate.

As an insectivore, its ability to control insects may be limited; however, reviews of studies have shown that the removal of bird species has increased insect herbivore activity, and increased crop damage.
