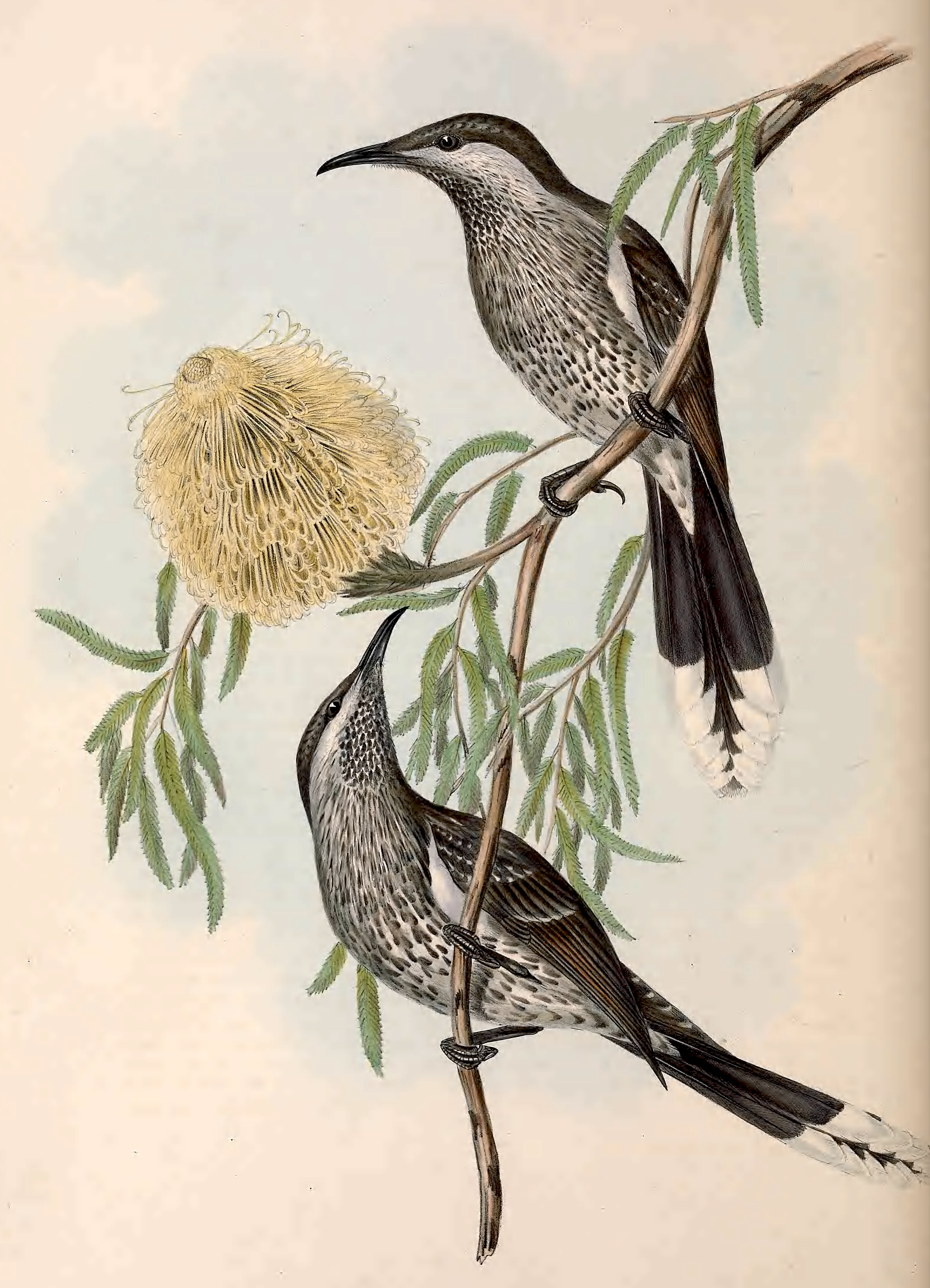
- Illustration of pair by Gould and Richter, 1848

Conservation status
- Least Concern (IUCN 3.1)

Scientific classification
- Kingdom: Animalia
- Phylum: Chordata
- Class: Aves
- Order: Passeriformes
- Family: Meliphagidae
- Genus: Anthochaera
- Species: A. lunulata

Binomial name
- Anthochaera lunulata Gould, 1838

Synonyms
- Anthochaera chrysoptera

= Western wattlebird =

Species of bird

The western wattlebird (Anthochaera lunulata) is a passerine bird in the honeyeater family, Meliphagidae. It is restricted to south-western Australia.

== Taxonomy ==
The species description was published by John Gould in 1838, from a specimen collected at the Swan River and held at "Fort Pitt, Chatham collection". The entry in his The Birds of Australia (1848) gives a common name of "Lunulated Wattle-Bird", and notes that the colonists referred to it as the little wattlebird. A treatment as a western population of the species Anthochaera chrysoptera, and thus conspecific with the 'little wattlebird' group of the eastern states, is cited by some authorities. Both species are assigned to the subgenus Anthochaera (Anellobia), taking its name from the generic description of Jean Cabanis (1851). Other workers regard this as a separate species, A. lunulata, based on morphological and plumage differences, and a different eye colour in these two populations. The taxonomy enthusiast, G. M. Mathews, published a description as the subspecies Anthochaera chrysoptera albani in his Austral Avian Record (1923), now regarded as a synonym for this species.

The epithet lunulata 'crescent-shaped' is derived from Latin lunula for 'little moon'.

== Description ==
The adult western wattlebird has dark grey-brown upper-parts with pale streaks and spots. It has a dark brown forehead, crown and nape, streaked with fine, whitish shafts. Underparts are dark grey, streaked and tipped white. It has a blackish-brown streak bordering the eye, and has a red iris.

A large honeyeater, it is long and slender. A sample of both sexes recorded sizes of 29–33 centimetres in length, 65–78 grams in weight for the males; and 27–30 cm and 47–57 g for the females. The weight range for unsexed birds is 45.5–83 grams.

== Distribution ==
Found in the southwest of Australia, in the high rainfall area formerly dominated by forest and woodland. They occur toward the coast from Israelite Bay north to Geraldton, and inland to the Stirling Range, Lake Grace and Northam.

== Gallery ==
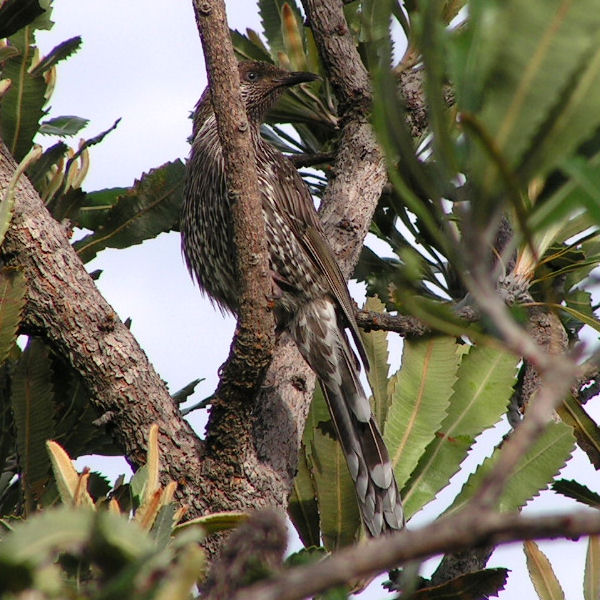
In a tree, Perth

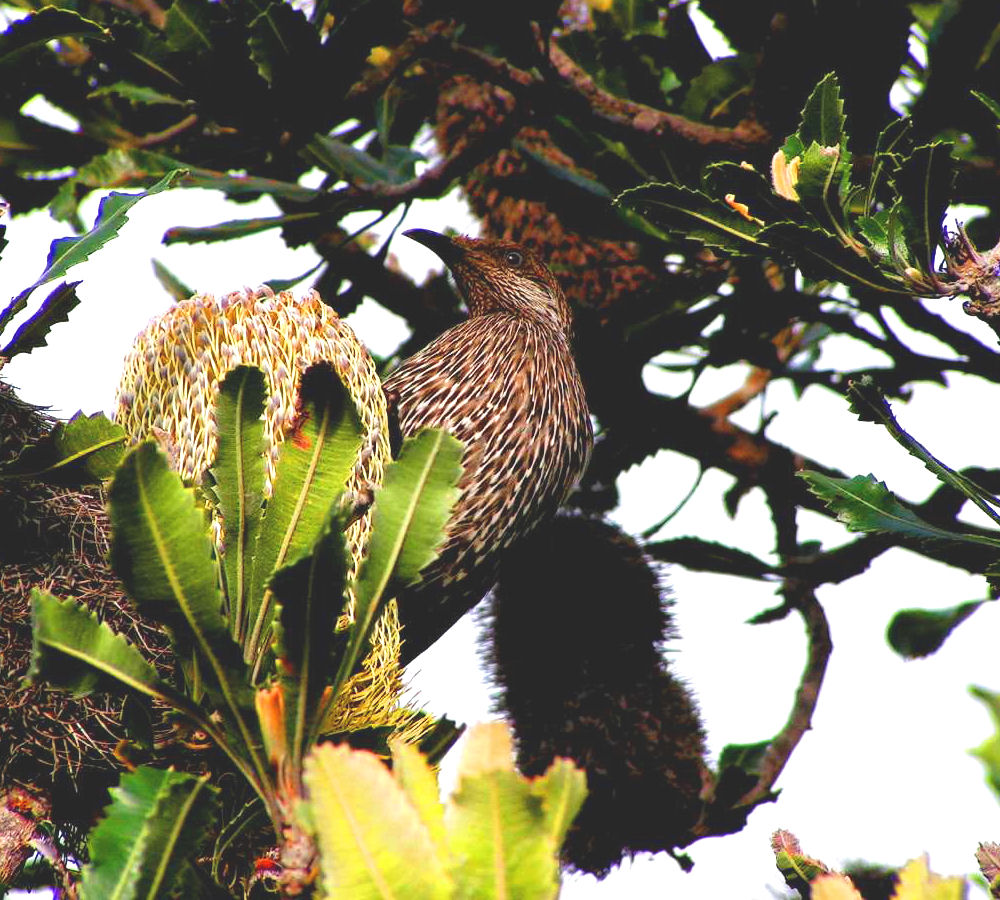
On a flowering Banksia
